= 3DiTeams =

2007 video game

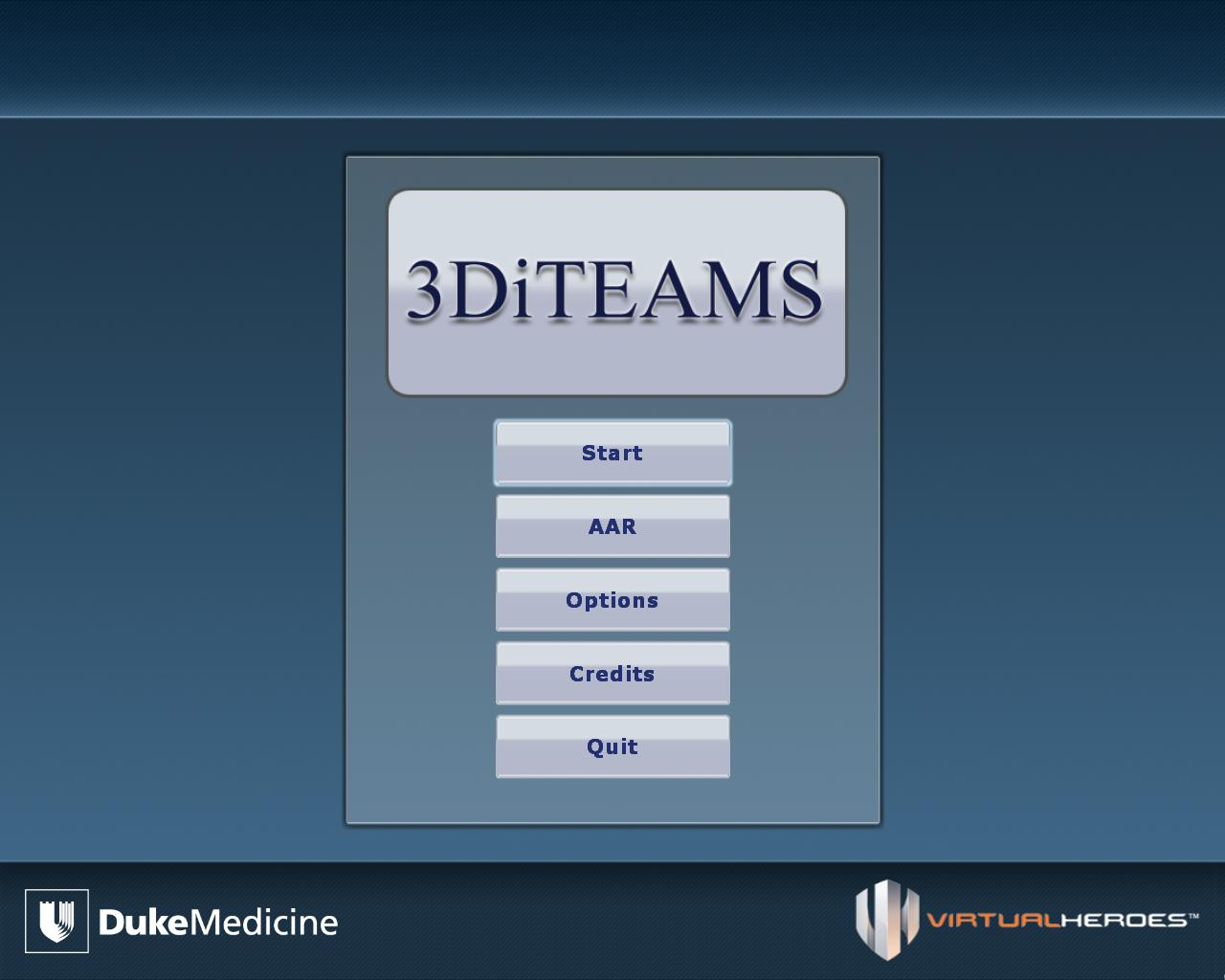
- Developers: Duke University Medical Center and Virtual Heroes
- Publishers: Duke University Medical Center and Virtual Heroes
- Designers: Troy Bowman and Steven Cattrell
- Engine: Unreal Engine 2
- Platform: Microsoft Windows (98/ME/2000/XP)
- Release: November 2007
- Genre: Serious game
- Mode: multiplayer

3DiTeams (also known as 3Di TEAMS) is a first person serious video game developed by the Duke University Medical Center and Virtual Heroes and used for medical education and team training. The 3DiTeams Project was conceived by Dr. Jeffrey M. Taekman and Jerry Heneghan and is managed by the Human Simulation and Patient Safety Center at Duke University Medical Center, Durham, North Carolina.

The project was unveiled to the general public in a workshop entitled "3DiTeams – Team Training in a Virtual Interactive Environment" hosted by the American Society of Anesthesiologists Annual Meeting in San Francisco, California on October 16, 2007. Since that time, it has been the subject of presentations for the Second Annual TeamSTEPPS Consortium Meeting, the Fourth Annual Games for Health Conference, First Annual North Carolina Advanced Learning Technology Summit, and Leadership Symposium on Digital Media in Health Care.

== Training ==
The training is based on the United States Department of Defense Patient Safety Program and Agency for Healthcare Research and Quality's TeamSTEPPS curriculum. The player starts the training in an "independent leaning phase" where they are introduced to the teamwork and communication skills and apply the skills by identifying the behaviors in a series of short videos.

The second phase of learning is the "collaboration / team coordination phase" where up to 32 players enter the virtual training environment. Taking place in a fictional field hospital or hospital emergency room, the player begins each mission outside of the care area awaiting the patient's arrival.

All of the group members are shown as avatars and are able to interact with each other, as well as the patients and instruments. Everyone has a predetermined role as a doctor, nurse, technician, or observer as the instructor begins a briefing for the upcoming patient interaction. Once the patient has arrived, the team enters the room and begins to assess and treat the patient. The instructor's user interface allows them to manually control the patient's vital signs in response to the player's actions or by allowing the embedded physiology engine to control the patient's response. Once the patient is stabilized a telephone handoff takes place between the care team and the receiving care team. The team then reassembles outside the patient care area to perform a debriefing or after action review of their care. Gameplay ends when the team leader dismisses the team.

The final phase of learning is accomplished by an instructor's lead after action review of the team's communication skills during their interaction. A video playback of the Scenario is used to allow the players to observe their own behaviors as well as those of the team.

== Development status ==
In 2006, the Telemedicine and Advanced Technology Research Center, a subordinate element of the United States Army Medical Research and Materiel Command, funded a one-year $249,530 award to support the "3DiTeams: Gaming Environment for Training Healthcare Team Coordination Skills" study.
