= United States Army Medical Logistics Command =

Manager of medical equipment logistics

Army Medical Logistics Command
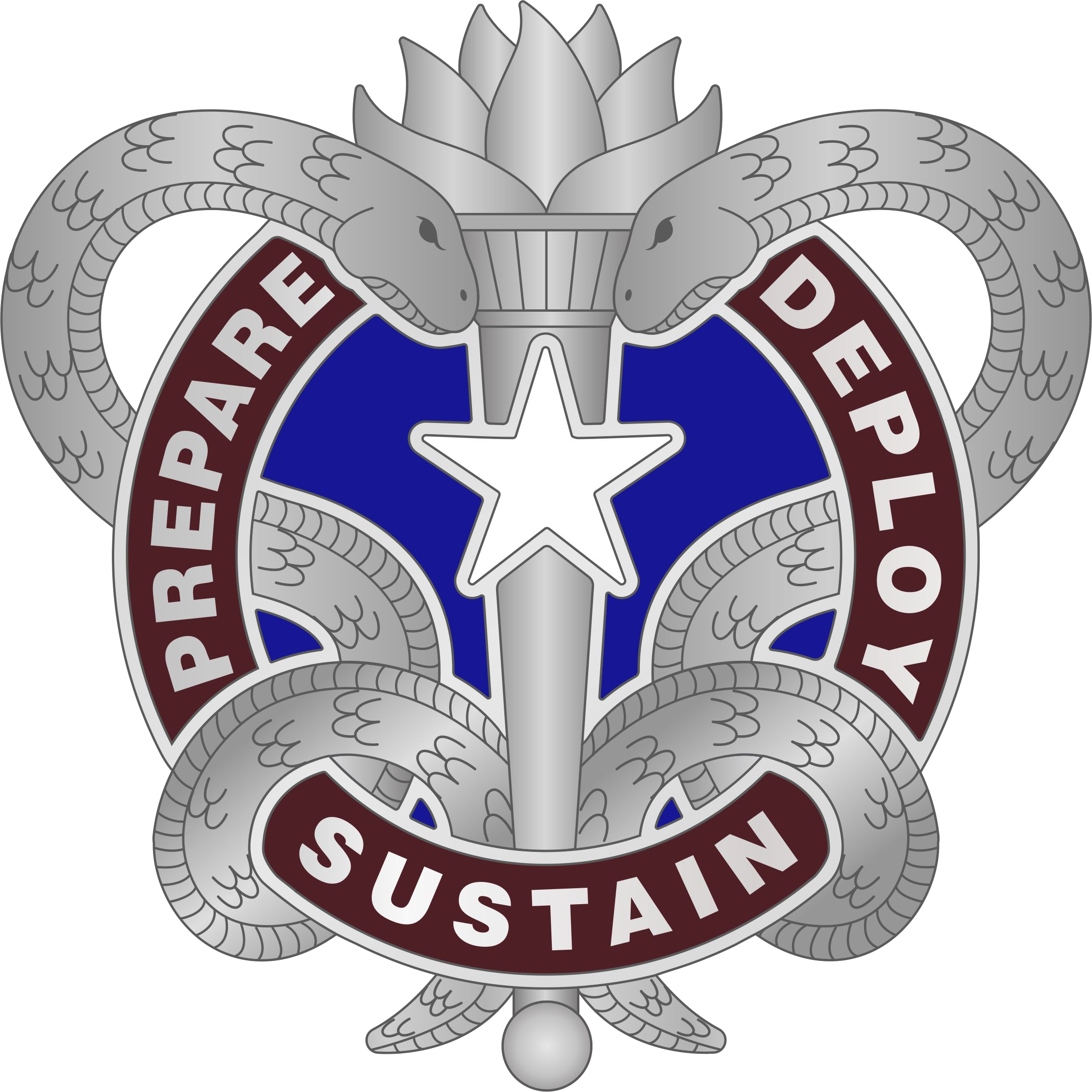
- AMLC distinctive unit insignia
- Active: 1 June 2019 – present
- Country: United States
- Branch: United States Army
- Type: Command
- Role: Army medical equipment logistics management
- Part of: U.S. Army Communications-Electronics Command
- Garrison/HQ: Fort Detrick, Maryland
- Mottos: "Prepare, Deploy, Sustain."
- Website: www.amlc.army.mil

Insignia
- U.S. Army Materiel Command shoulder sleeve insignia, worn by AMLC service members

The U.S. Army Medical Logistics Command (AMLC) is a command of the United States Army that manages the logistics and maintenance of medical equipment and supplies used by the U.S. Army. Headquartered on Fort Detrick, Maryland, the AMLC is a command of the U.S. Army Communications-Electronics Command.

== History ==
The U.S. Army Medical Logistics Command (AMLC) was formed on 1 June 2019, during a restructuring of the U.S. Army Medical Research and Materiel Command (MRMC). On that date, research, development, and acquisition elements of MRMC were re-designated as the U.S. Army Medical Research and Development Command (MRDC), which transferred to U.S. Army Futures Command. Medical logistics functions previously belonging to MRMC remained with the U.S. Army Materiel Command, and were separated into the new AMLC.

At some point, the AMLC was designated as a major subordinate command (MSC) of the Army Materiel Command (AMC).

In July 2021, the AMLC transitioned from AMC MSC status to be a component of the U.S. Army Communications-Electronics Command (CECOM). The reason AMLC transferred under CECOM was due to the similarities in managing intricate parts in communications-electronics and medical equipment.

The AMLC's Integrated Logistics Support Center (ILSC) was established in 2022. On 1 October 2025, the AMLC ILSC was discontinued and transferred to the CECOM ILSC as the Medical Logistics Directorate.

Also on 1 October 2025, the USAMMA Distribution Operations Center was transferred to the Defense Health Agency (DHA). The remainder of the U.S. Army Medical Materiel Agency (USAMMA) already has, or will, merge into the AMLC, with the USAMMA ceasing operations in July 2026.

== Organization ==
- U.S. Army Medical Materiel Agency (USAMMA), Fort Detrick, Maryland
- U.S. Army Medical Materiel Center, Europe (USAMMC-E), Kaiserslautern, Germany
- U.S. Army Medical Materiel Center, Korea (USAMMC-K), Camp Carroll, South Korea

== Insignia ==
=== Distinctive unit insignia ===
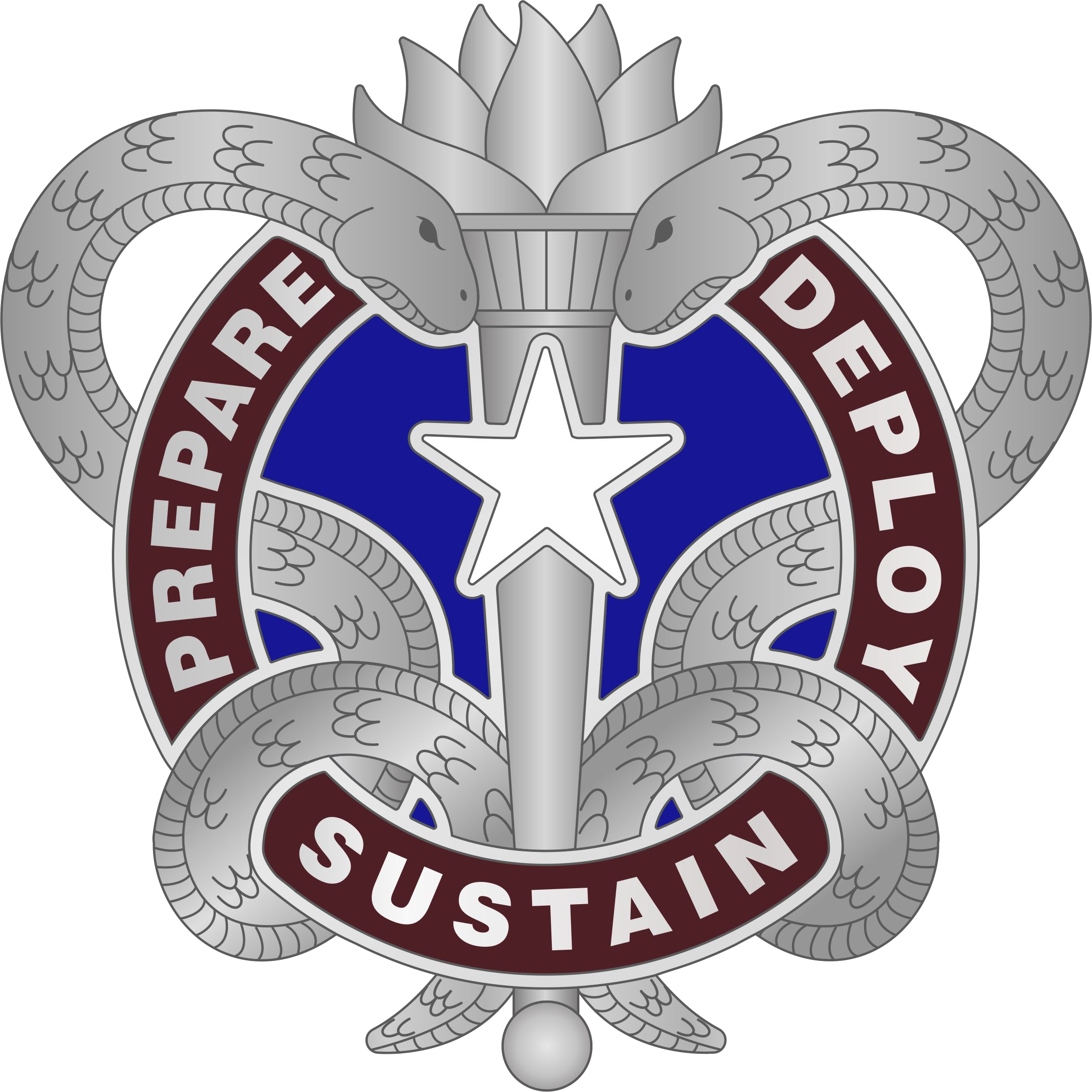
AMLC distinctive unit insignia

The distinctive unit insignia of the U.S. Army Medical Logistics Command was approved by the Institute of Heraldry in October 2019.

According to the Institute of Heraldry, the maroon-and-silver colors coincide with the traditional colors of the Army Medical Department. A blue disc inside the maroon band alludes to the earth, reflecting the AMLC's global posture.

The two serpents, facing one another, were adapted from the Army Medical Corps branch insignia. Their tails wrap around the band bearing the AMLC motto, further implying the close connection between the command's logistics duties in preparation, deployment, and sustainment.

The torch in the center represents the AMLC's mission to ensure readiness. A single white star, which conveys the organization's status as a 1-star (brigadier general-led) command, is centered on the insignia.

The command's motto is "Prepare, Deploy, Sustain."

== See also ==
Other U.S. military medical organizations

- U.S. Army Medical Command (MEDCOM)
- U.S. Army Medical Research and Development Command (MRDC), medical equipment developer
