= Susan Zolla-Pazner =

American research scientist

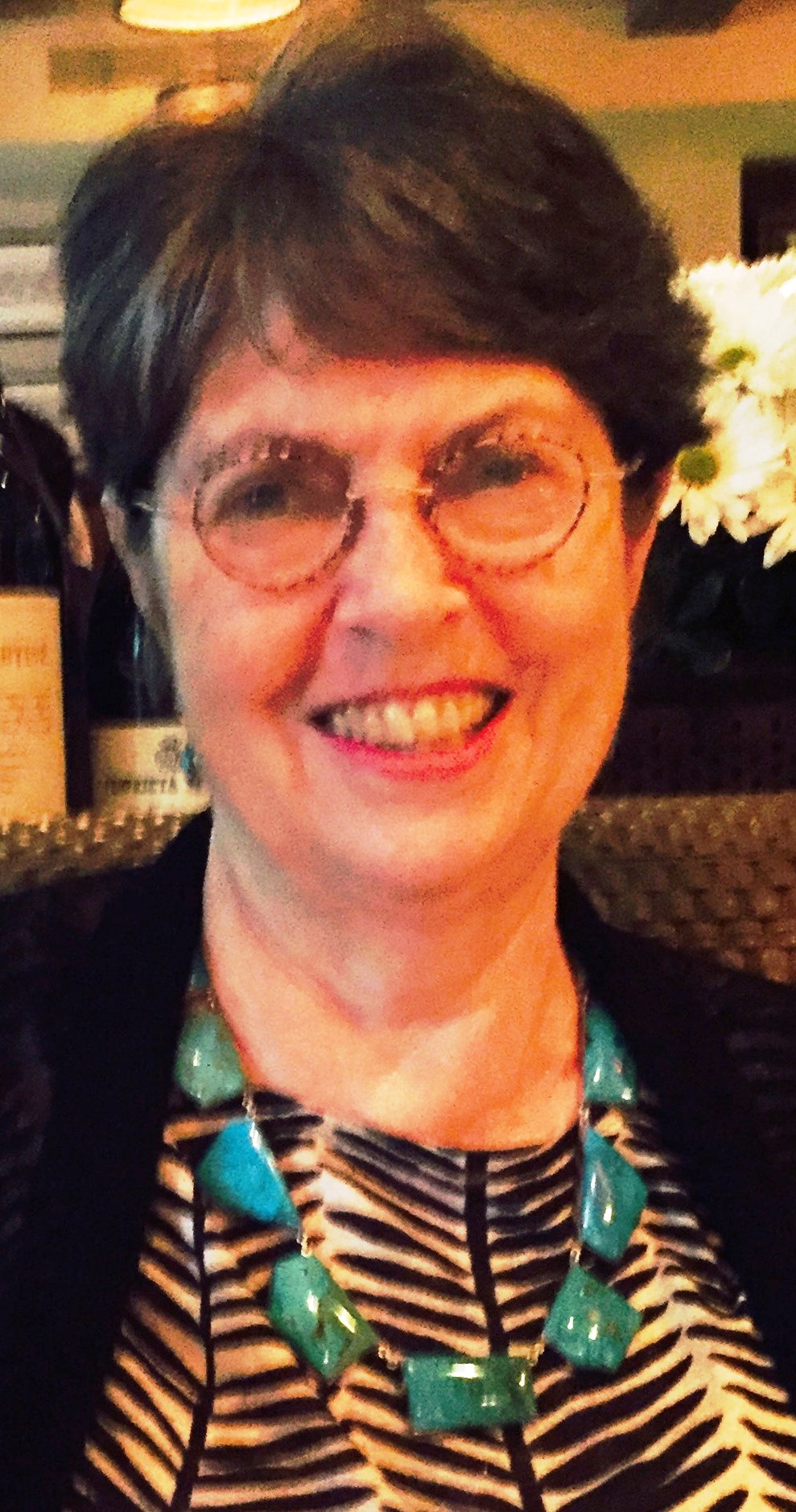
Susan Zolla-Pazner

Susan Zolla-Pazner is an American research scientist who is a Professor of Medicine in the Division of Infectious Diseases and the Department of Microbiology at Mount Sinai School of Medicine, a guest investigator in the Laboratory of Molecular Immunology at The Rockefeller University, and a voluntary instructor at Stanford University. Her work has focused on how the immune system responds to the human immunodeficiency virus (HIV) and, in particular, how antibodies against the viral envelope develop in the course of infection.

Zolla-Pazner was among the researchers who initially described the immunologic abnormalities affecting homosexual men in 1981 in New York City who were dying from an unknown illness which later became known as AIDS. In the years since, she has examined the body's immune response to the virus. She is the co-inventor on 23 patents and the author of more than 350 scientific publications.

== Early life and education ==
Zolla-Pazner received her B. A. at Stanford University and her PhD in Medical Microbiology at the University of California Medical Center, San Francisco.

== Research ==
Zolla-Pazner's work helped establish the central role of antibodies in protection from HIV infection. She proposed quantifying the antibodies directed at the second and third variable loops (V2 and V3) of the HIV envelope protein gp120, as observed in the Phase 3 RV144 clinical HIV vaccine trial, which involved 16,402 participants in Thailand. Her research indicated that high levels of antibodies to the second variable region of the virus envelope protein, V2, correlated with a reduced rate of infection. Antibodies to V3 were subsequently identified as an additional correlate of protection, exerting immune pressure on viruses infecting individuals who had received the vaccine. Zolla-Pazner's research indicated that the search for an effective vaccine should focus not only on inducing specific types of antibodies but on eliciting a durable antibody response, as post-hoc analysis showed the levels of antibodies waned within 6 months of the last dose of the vaccine. Her findings established the key role of antibodies specific for the virus envelope's variable regions in protection from HIV infection; they also validated her hypothesis that antibodies to variable regions could be protective—a highly controversial point until then.

In the early days of the AIDS epidemic, the Zolla-Pazner lab described the hyperactivation of B lymphocytes in the blood of HIV-infected individuals. This discovery led her to develop methods to generate anti-HIV human monoclonal antibodies (mAbs) from the blood cells of HIV-infected individuals. Her lab isolated and described human mAbs capable of neutralizing the infectivity of the virus, and, later, isolated a mAb with strong neutralizing potency targeting a complex conformational region on the surface of the virus' envelope protein composed of V2 and V3. This was the first isolation and description of a family of antibodies known for their extreme potency in neutralizing HIV. Her lab also described how antibodies to V2 and V3 could bind and neutralize viruses from all over the globe, despite extreme variations in amino acid sequences.

In 1981, Zolla-Pazner participated in the description of the immunologic abnormalities of patients presenting with Kaposi's sarcoma, which was associated with the then-mysterious illness that later became known as AIDS. She initiated systemic testing to enumerate CD4 and CD8 cells and antibodies in order to diagnose HIV infection and follow the effects of treatment with antiretroviral drugs. She was also responsible for the description of immunologic abnormalities in the first patients with AIDS-related Mycobacterium avium-intracellulare infections and for identifying similar immunologic abnormalities in apparently healthy gay men who later developed AIDS. This latter work was an early indication of the chilling reality that one-third of gay men in New York City were suffering from this fatal but as-yet-unidentified illness. In 1989, Zolla-Pazner became Director of AIDS Research at the Manhattan Veterans Administration Medical Center, part of the NYU School of Medicine, where she was a member of the Department of Pathology for 46 years. In 2015, Zolla-Pazner moved to Mount Sinai School of Medicine.

Building on her correlation of levels of V2 antibodies with reduced infection rates in the RV144 vaccine trial, Zolla-Pazner and her colleagues have spent the last 10 years developing "designer vaccines," i.e., V2- and V3-scaffold proteins that focus the immune response on the production of antibodies specific for these two regions of gp120. Studies of these recombinant vaccine constructs in both rabbits and nonhuman primates have demonstrated that they induce antibodies that react with the envelopes of diverse viruses within the various subgroups of HIV and have biologic activities that have been associated with protection from infection.
