= WisdomTools Enterprises =

WisdomTools Enterprises, Inc.
- Company type: Video game developer
- Industry: Video games
- Founded: 1999
- Headquarters: Bloomington, Indiana, United States
- Subsidiaries: WisdomTools LLC & Holutions, Inc.
- Website: http://www.wisdomtools.com/

WisdomTools Enterprises, Inc. (WT), formerly known as Information In Place, Inc, (IIPI) is a serious game developer and e-learning company.

WT has developed or is in the process of developing hazmat games, K-20 serious games, space games and a virtual Congress game.

== Subsidiaries ==
- On March 5, 2009, IIPI announced the acquisition of WisdomTools, a venture-backed company that was the first spin-out of Indiana University. IIPI acquired all the assets and customer contracts of WisdomTools, Inc. and formed WisdomTools, LLC, which is a single member limited liability corporation.
- In March 2008, IIPI founded Holutions, Inc., a C corporation, led by Matthew Burton, M.D. for the purposes of offering health care solutions in workflow and training areas to hospitals.

== Serious game announcements ==
- On February 18, 2009, it was reported that WisdomTools Enterprises, Inc., and its partners Virtual Heroes, Inc. and Project Whitecard, were selected by NASA to build the NASA MMO: Astronaut: Moon, Mars and Beyond, a Massively multiplayer online game for promoting learning in science, technology, engineering and mathematics (STEM) fields.
