= Virtual Heroes =

Developer of serious games in Raleigh, North Carolina

Virtual Heroes, Inc.
- Type: Developer
- Industry: Serious Game Development
- Founded: Raleigh, North Carolina, 2004
- Key people: Jerry Heneghan (Founder); Randy Brown (Division Manager)
- Products: Serious Games, Virtual Reality, After-Action Review, Interaction Editor, Dynamic Terrain, Real-Time Physics, Terrain Databases
- Number of employees: ~40
- Parent: Applied Research Associates
- Website: www.virtualheroes.com

Virtual Heroes, Inc. is a developer of serious games in Raleigh, North Carolina, United States. It was founded in 2004.

Virtual Heroes' initial projects focused on creating new technology and content for the U.S. Army game America's Army. The company has expanded to develop serious games, 3D computer simulations, and training applications. They also license the Unreal Engine in the government space through the Unreal Government Network.

== Organization ==
Virtual Heroes, Inc. was founded by Jerry Heneghan, formerly at Tom Clancy's Red Storm Entertainment and Research Triangle Institute (RTI). In 2009, Virtual Heroes was acquired by Applied Research Associates, Inc. (ARA), a New Mexico-based scientific engineering and research firm. In 2012, Virtual Heroes became the Virtual Heroes Division of ARA managed by Randy Brown, formerly of Amoco, Digital Equipment Corporation, Data General, SAS Institute, SouthPeak Games and RTI International.

== History ==
=== As Virtual Heroes, Inc. ===
Virtual Heroes, Inc. was founded in 2004 by CEO Jerry Heneghan, formerly at Tom Clancy's Red Storm Entertainment and Research Triangle Institute (RTI). Serving as CTO was Randy Brown, formerly of Amoco, Digital Equipment Corporation, Data General, SAS Institute, SouthPeak Games and RTI International.

Early projects included the Virtual Peace serious game, for which Virtual Heroes was a co-recipient of a McArthur Fellowship Grant. The game trained non-governmental organizations on humanitarian assistance and crisis intervention. [citation: https://www.hastac.org/initiatives/hastac-scholars/scholars-forums/participatory-play-digital-games-spacewar-virtual-peace]

In 2007, Virtual Heroes supported the Discovery Channel Canada television science fiction mini-series Race to Mars, about a fictitious Mars mission. Virtual Heroes produced 3D educational game modules for the series’ corresponding website.

In 2008 Virtual Heroes created Hilton Ultimate Team Play, a training tool for Hilton Garden Inn employees developed for the Sony PSP. There were 500 copies of the game printed, which led to the game being called the "rarest PSP Game Ever.” Also in 2008, Virtual Heroes created Pamoja Mtaani, a multiplayer game for Warner Bros. The game was developed to target HIV prevention & reduce infections in East African youth in Kenya. [ref: http://serious.gameclassification.com/EN/games/14938-Pamoja-Mtaani-/index.html]

=== As a Division of Applied Research Associates, Inc. ===
In 2009, Virtual Heroes was acquired by Applied Research Associates, Inc. (ARA), a New Mexico-based scientific engineering and research firm. In 2012, Virtual Heroes became the Virtual Heroes Division of ARA managed by Virtual Heroes CTO Randy Brown.

As part of ARA, Virtual Heroes developed several serious games for medical and science training. In 2009, Virtual Heroes released Zero Hour: America's Medic, which was described by Wired Magazine as "training first responders for real-life natural disasters and terrorist attacks". The project was developed with George Washington University's Office of Homeland Security on a 4.8 Million dollar grant from the Department of Homeland Security.

In July, 2010 Virtual Heroes released Moonbase Alpha as a free download on Steam. Moonbase Alpha provides gameplay on the moon based on accurate NASA equipment at the time for the Constellation Program. The game was made by Virtual Heroes and the Army Game Studio, developers of America's Army, in conjunction with NASA Learning Technologies. Moonbase Alpha was designed as a tech demo to test ideas to be used in Astronaut: Moon, Mars and Beyond, NASA's massively multiplayer online game. It was also designed to encourage an interest in space exploration in school children. [ref: https://www.nasa.gov/pdf/526940main_Moonbase_Alpha_Educator_Guide_v1.pdf]

In 2014 Virtual Heroes developed the Combat Medic serious game for the U.S. Army's Simulation and Training Technology Center. The game trains medics to treat internal bleeding, lung collapse, and tracheobronchial injury (airway trauma), the top three causes of battlefield deaths. It incorporates material from the US Army Medical Department's 68W Advanced Field Craft Combat Medic Skills textbook. The game is available for use by all U.S. military branches.

In 2018, Virtual Heroes won a $2.6M contract with the US Army to develop a 3D trainer for medics to treat serious burn injuries. The training app was released publicly for Android devices as BurnCARE Virtual Trainer in 2022.

== Focus Areas ==
=== Serious Games ===
Virtual Heroes is considered a leading company in the serious games market. The Virtual Heroes Division headquarters in Raleigh, North Carolina features a full game studio with artists, game designers, and game developers.

=== Terrain Generation ===
When Virtual Heroes became a division of ARA, it merged with ARA’s Central Florida Division in Orlando, Florida, a developer of modeling and simulation software for the Department of Defense. One of the division’s products is the Rapid Unified Generation of Urban Databases (RUGUD) software, which is used to generate 3D terrain databases. RUGUD was developed for the Army's Simulation and Training Technology Center and is used by the Army for training purposes.

=== Virtual Reality ===
In 2019, the Virtual Heroes Division of ARA was awarded a DoD contract to develop the Virtual Tactical Assault Kit. The virtual reality tool was designed for improved mission planning and rehearsal and better situational awareness. VTAK is part of the TAK family of products.

=== COVID-19 ===
In 2020, Virtual Heroes released their titles Mission Biotech and Human Sim: Sedation and Airway for free to support COVID-19 education and training.

Virtual Heroes created Mission Biotech in conjunction with the University of Florida with funding by the National Science Foundation . The game promotes careers in biotechnology and teaches how scientists search and test for clues to identify a virus during a pandemic outbreak.

The Telemedicine and Advanced Technology Research Center (United States Army) (TATRC) funded Virtual Heroes to develop Human Sim: Sedation and Airway, a 3D training tool for medics to administer emergency anesthesia and manage breathing. The software uses the integrated Biogears real-time physiology engine.

== Projects ==
=== 3Di Teams ===
3DiTeams was developed in collaboration with Duke University Medical Center and used for medical education and team training. The game is intended for training and exercising of medical teams of practitioners of many levels of clinical expertise. The scope of practice of the tools in the game are geared toward care of a trauma patient and the interpersonal communications that surround the patient's care. The training is based on the United States Department of Defense Patient Safety Program and Agency for Healthcare Research and Quality's TeamSTEPPS curriculum. In 2006, the Telemedicine and Advanced Technology Research Center (TATRC), a division of the United States Army Medical Research and Materiel Command, funded a one-year $249,530 award to support the "3DiTeams: Gaming Environment for Training Healthcare Team Coordination Skills" study. The team was also awarded a 2-year $291,248 grant from the NIH Agency for Healthcare Research and Quality for their study on "Virtual Health Care Environments Versus Traditional Interactive Team Training."

=== Virtual Peace ===
The company was a co-recipient of a McArthur Fellowship Grant to create a serious game intended to train Non-governmental organizations entitled "Virtual Peace".

=== Zero Hour: America's Medic ===
Zero Hour: America's Medic was described by Wired Magazine as "training first responders for real-life natural disasters and terrorist attacks". The project was developed with George Washington University's Office of Homeland Security on a $4.8 million grant from the Department of Homeland Security.

=== Moonbase Alpha ===
Moonbase Alpha provides gameplay on the moon based on accurate NASA equipment at the time for the Constellation Program. It was made by the Army Game Studio, developers of America's Army, and Virtual Heroes, Inc. in conjunction with NASA Learning Technologies. The game was released on July 6, 2010, as a free download on Steam. Moonbase Alpha was designed as a tech demo to test ideas to be used in Astronaut: Moon, Mars and Beyond, NASA's massively multiplayer online game. It was also designed to encourage an interest in space exploration in school children. At the Interservice/Industry Training, Simulation and Education Conference in 2010, the games won the top honors in the government category of the Serious Game Showcase & Challenge.

=== Human Sim: Sedation and Airway ===
The Telemedicine and Advanced Technology Research Center (United States Army) (TATRC) funded Virtual Heroes to develop Human Sim: Sedation and Airway, a 3D training tool for medics to manage tracheobronchial injury (airway trauma). The software uses the integrated Biogears real-time physiology engine.

=== Race to Mars ===
In 2007 the Discovery Channel Canada produced a television science fiction mini-series entitled Race to Mars about a fictitious Mars mission. The series’ corresponding website featured 3D educational game modules produced by Virtual Heroes and other developers.

=== Combat Medic ===
The Combat Medic serious game trains medics to treat internal bleeding, lung collapse, and tracheobronchial injury (airway trauma), the top three causes of battlefield deaths. It incorporates material from the US Army Medical Department's 68W Advanced Field Craft Combat Medic Skills textbook. Combat Medic was funded by the U.S. Army's Simulation and Training Technology Center and is available for use by all U.S. military branches. Combat Medic was named a finalist at the 2014 Serious Games Showcase and Challenge and a Gold Award at the International Serious Play Competition.

=== Heuristica ===
The Heuristica serious game is designed to improve users’ critical thinking and decision-making skills. The game is funded by the Intelligence Advanced Research Projects Activity (IARPA).

=== RUGUD ===
The Rapid Unified Generation of Urban Databases (RUGUD) software is used to generate terrain databases. RUGUD was developed for the Army's Simulation and Training Technology Center and is used by the Army for training purposes.

=== Mission Biotech ===
Mission Biotech was funded by the National Science Foundation and management of the game development provided by the University of Florida. The game promotes careers in biotechnology. Virtual Heroes released the game as a free download in 2015.

=== Virtual Smashmouth ===
Virtual Heroes developed Virtual Smashmouth for the 2008 Consumer Electronics Show. Keynote speaker Intel CEO Paul Otellini ended his speech by introducing a virtual performance by the band Smash Mouth. Motion capture technology enabled the four band members to play their song "All Star" from separate locations, with their avatars performing together on a giant screen. Virtual Heroes created the simulation's 3D virtual environment, based on Epic Games’ Unreal Engine. Organic Motion provided the real-time motion capture technology.

=== Hilton Ultimate Team Play ===
Hilton Ultimate Team play is a training tool for Hilton Garden Inn employees developed for the Sony PSP. There were 500 copies of the game printed, which led to the game being called the "rarest PSP Game Ever." David Kervella of Hilton Hotels Corporation demoed the game at the 2009 Game Developers Conference in San Francisco.

=== Pamoja Mtaani ===
Pamoja Mtaani is a multiplayer game developed for Warner Bros. and PEPFAR. The game was developed to target HIV prevention & reduce infections in East African youth in Kenya.
