= Jerome Kim =

Jerome Hahn Kim is Director General of the International Vaccine Institute (IVI).

He was educated at University of Hawaiʻi at Mānoa where he studied Biology and History, the Yale School of Medicine (MD, 1984), and completed his training at Duke University Medical Center. Prior to IVI, Dr. Kim led the US Army's advanced development program for HIV vaccines, the RV 144 HIV vaccine trial, and a molecular virology laboratory at Walter Reed Army Institute of Research.

He has an h-index of 76 according to Google Scholar.
