= Zero Hour: America's Medic =

2009 video game

- Developers: Virtual Heroes, Inc. Office of Homeland Security (George Washington University)
- Engine: Unreal Engine 3
- Platform: Microsoft Windows
- Release: WW: 2009
- Genre: Simulation video game
- Modes: Single-player, multiplayer

Zero Hour: America's Medic is a first person video game that is designed to train and exercise first responders to respond to mass casualty incidents such as earthquakes and terrorist attacks. Zero Hour was designed by George Washington University's Office of Homeland Security and Virtual Heroes, Inc. on a 4.8 million dollar grant from the Department of Homeland Security. Zero Hour is developed using Unreal Engine 3. It was released in May 2009.

== Purpose ==
According to GWU Office of Homeland Security's Associate Director Gregg Lord, the game is intended for training emergency responders. The scope of practice of the tools in the game are geared toward pre-hospital emergency medical service practitioners, especially paramedics.

An image on Wired.com's article (which is slightly different from the print edition) indicates that there are 13 points of interest on an in-game map. Five of those correspond to existing scenarios.

== Gameplay ==
Taking place in the fictional city of St. Lillo, the player begins each mission in an ambulance and receives calls from the EMS dispatcher. As the ambulance approaches the scene, the player sees the chaotic scene unfolding. The player chooses which equipment to bring and then acts in accordance with the unique requirements of the situation.

== Development status ==
On June 23, 2008, Wired published a brief story on the game. The website of the George Washington University Office of Homeland Security's National EMS Preparedness Initiative (NEMSPI) hosts a video demo of the game on its website along with extensive details of its benefits for pre-hospital medical professionals. Virtual Heroes' website provides additional details about the game.

The print edition of Wired's article (July 2008, page 68) indicates that the developer is seeking additional grant money in order to add an online component. As of February 2008, the NEMSPI "disaster simulation " page states that the game is complete and expected to launch in fall 2008, the main page in February 2009, and the course catalog page states that Zero Hour: America's Medic is available for download for the general public at a cost of $14.95.

Beginning October 10, 2014 the game is available to download for free on the Virtual Heroes website.
