= Starlite (video game) =

2014 video game

- Developer(s): NASA; Project Whitecard Enterprises Inc. WisdomTools Enterprises; Virtual Heroes
- Publisher(s): Project Whitecard Enterprises Inc.
- Platform(s): Microsoft Windows iPad
- Genre(s): MMO
- Mode(s): Multiplayer

Starlite: Astronaut Academy (formerly Astronaut: Moon, Mars and Beyond) is an abandoned multiplayer online game developed by Project Whitecard Studios, Virtual Heroes, and WisdomTools Enterprises. The game was first announced in 2011 with backing from NASA, described as a "3D avatar community around a fictional depiction of the year 2035," where players would learn about real-life NASA missions and play through single-player and multi-player missions.

Sections of Starlite were eventually released as spin-offs, all receiving poor reviews from players. Virtual Heroes went on to develop and release Moonbase Alpha, a simulation game set on the Moon that received favorable reviews. Project Whitecard later published Star Rangers, a space exploration and construction game in Early Access on Steam, which is also abandoned.

== Development ==
WisdomTools Enterprises (then known as Information in Place), Virtual Heroes, and Project Whitecard were selected by NASA in 2009 to create an educational multiplayer online game centered around space exploration. The game was set to include single-player and team-based missions, using NASA assets such as 3D renders of Mars rovers and telescope images. NASA agreed to provide mission information and expertise, but development costs were set to be paid for by "private investments and corporate sponsorships."

Astronaut: Moon, Mars & Beyond launched as a Kickstarter crowdfunding project on August 12, 2011, exceeding its goal of $25,000 by raising $46,719 from 962 backers. The game was in development for "iPhone, PC and select consoles," with an estimated release date of 2012.

By November 2012, Project Whitecard and Wisdom Tools had received $750,000 in funding from the Canada Media Fund. In March 2014, the game's title was changed to Starlite: Astronaut Academy. Project Whitecard intended to release sections of the game as spin-off "modules," with the full game set for release in 2015.

Starlite: Astronaut Rescue was the first spin-off game to be released, in January 2014. It was described as a "single-player 20 minute mini-adventure" set on Mars, and players who purchased the game would be "guaranteed a spot in the Starlite: Astronaut Academy beta test." The game received poor reviews from players, and currently has a rating of "Mostly Negative" on Steam. Another spin-off, G-Ball, was released on Steam in July 2014 to poor reviews.

The final Kickstarter project update for Starlite: Astronaut Academy was published in December 2015, which only mentioned Star Rangers HQ, another space game developed by Project Whitecard.
