= Joseph C. Sharp =

American psychologist

Joseph Cecil Sharp II (May 30, 1934 — January 13, 2021) was an American psychologist.

Sharp was born in Salt Lake City, Utah, US, on May 30, 1934 to Helen Swenson and Cecil Sharp. He married Pauline Burnham in 1956. Sharp received his B.S., M.S., and Ph.D. in psychology and neuroanatomy from the University of Utah.

In 1961, he began his career as a research psychologist at the Walter Reed Army Institute of Research where, in 1970, he was appointed deputy director of neuropsychiatry. He also served as Chief of the Department of Experimental Psychology and Behavioral Radiology at Walter Reed, and in 1969 and 1970, was Deputy Commissioner of Public Health for the State of New York. He later moved to California and worked at NASA's Ames Research Center from 1974 to 1994. For the last five of those years, he was the director of the Office of Space Research. After retiring from Ames, he began teaching at Southern Utah University's College of Science in Cedar City, Utah.

He died on January 13, 2021, and was buried in the Tonaquint Cemetery in Saint George, Utah.
