= Defense Centers for Public Health-Aberdeen =

Forward operating agency of the U.S. Army Medical Command

The Defense Centers for Public Health-Aberdeen (DCPH-A, formerly: U.S. Army Public Health Center, APHC) is a United States Army element headquartered at Aberdeen Proving Ground, Maryland, United States. As a forward operating agency of the United States Army Medical Command, DCPH-A is responsible for providing technical support and expertise in the areas of preventive medicine, public health, health promotion, and wellness to military units around the globe.

Steven Cersovsky, MD, MPH serves as the director.

The Maryland Office of ORAU and the Oak Ridge Institute for Science and Education administers research participation programs for DCPH-A.

== History ==
=== Before 2015 ===
The lineage of the DCPH-A can be traced back to the Army Industrial Hygiene Laboratory, which was established in 1942 under the direct jurisdiction of the Army surgeon general. AIHL originally was located at the Johns Hopkins School of Hygiene and Public Health; it had a staff of three and an annual budget of $3,000. Its mission was to conduct occupational health surveys and investigations within the Department of Defense industrial production base, a mission that proved beneficial to the nation's war effort. In October 1945, AIHL was transferred to what is now Aberdeen Proving Ground - South. From 1940 to 1960, AIHL's mission and personnel continued to expand, and AIHL became the U.S. Army Environmental Hygiene Agency (USAEHA) located at Edgewood Arsenal which was later merged with Aberdeen Proving Ground. During the 1960s and early 1970s, AEHA provided a variety of public health services to all US-based Army installations, including water supply, water and air pollution control, industrial hygiene, and others.

In 1973, USAEHA became a subordinate command of the U.S. Army Health Services Command (the latter later became the United States Army Medical Command). The following year, USAEHA was given command of the health and environmental resources of the Army medical laboratories. These assets became USAEHA subordinate commands.

In 1994, USAEHA was re-designated as the United States Army Center for Health Promotion and Preventive Medicine. In addition to its continental United States regional commands, USACHPPM also had two subordinate commands. In 1995, USACHPPM Europe was activated in Landstuhl, Germany, and USACHPPM Pacific was activated, moving in 1997 to Camp Zama, Japan.

In 2010, the center was merged with the United States Army Veterinary Command (VETCOM) to form U.S. Army Public Health Command. VETCOM supported almost 500 DOD installations worldwide and included the DOD Veterinary Food Analysis and Diagnostic Laboratory and the DOD Military Working Dog Veterinary Service. Through this merger, a military organization was born that embodies the “One Health” approach to public health.

One Health is the concept that health in animals, people, and the environment is interrelated; that is, the health of each contributes to the health of all. The formal uniting of prevention, health promotion, and veterinary missions allowed for coordination, synchronization, and integration of the military public health services around the globe.

USAPHC, inactivated on October 1, 2016, had six subordinate elements: the Army Institute for Health and five regional commands located at Fort George G. Meade in Maryland; Joint Base San Antonio in Texas; Joint Base Lewis-McChord in Washington; Landstuhl Regional Medical Center in Germany; and Camp Zama in Japan. USAPHC's mission was to promote health and prevent disease, injury, and disability of Soldiers and retirees, their Families, and Army civilians, and to provide veterinary medicine services for the Army and Department of Defense. USAPHC also provided consulting services to senior military leaders, commanders both deployed and in garrison, and military medical and health professionals.

=== U.S. Army Public Health Center ===
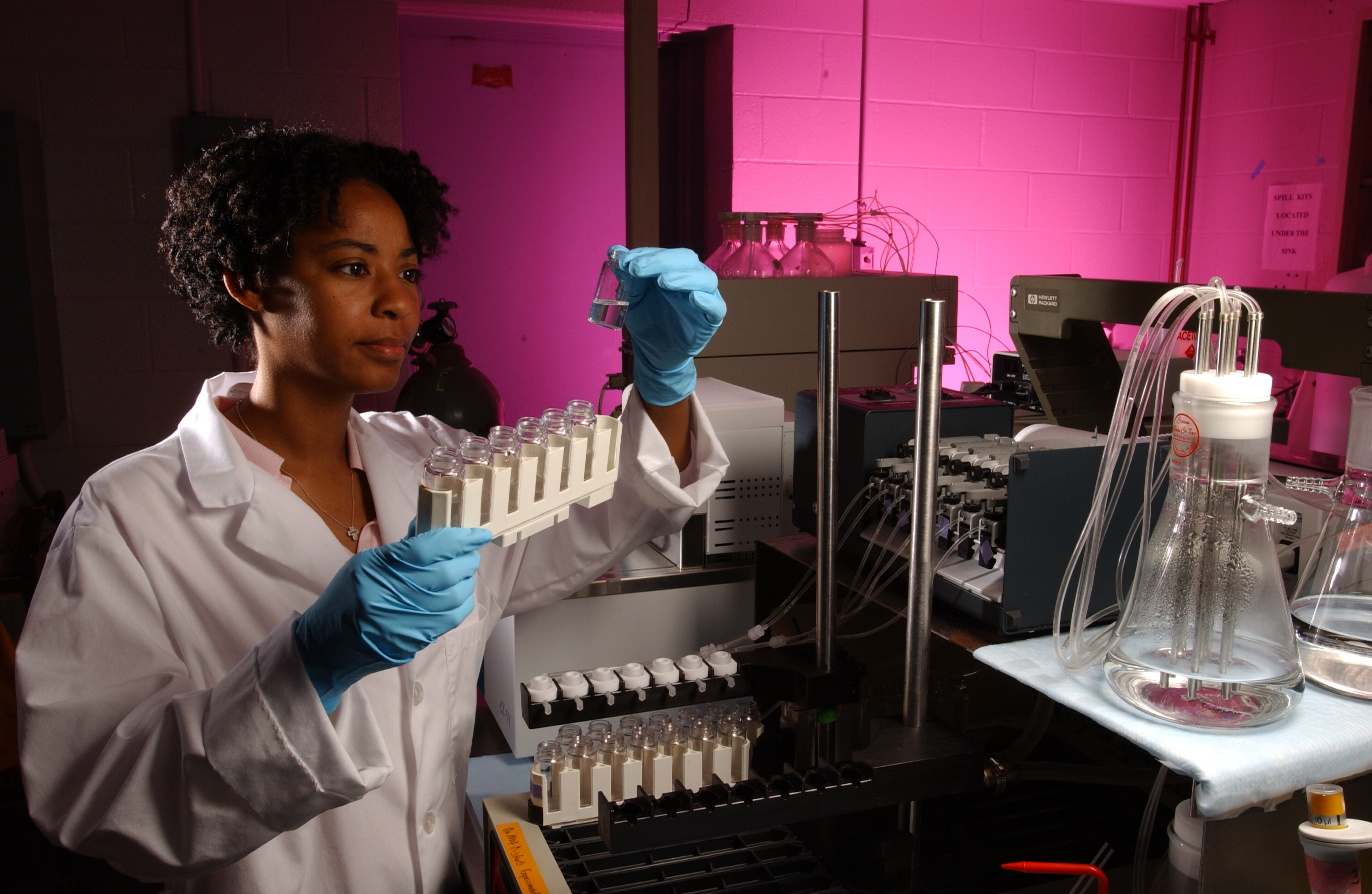
USAPHC Toxicology Lab technician assessing samples

The APHC reached provisional status on August 17, 2015 and full operating capacity on October 1, 2016.

Headquartered at Aberdeen Proving Ground, Maryland, the DCPH-A is a field operating activity of the U.S. Army Medical Command, but it is unique among MEDCOM organizations in these ways:

- Its “patients” are populations, that is groups of people—military units, their families, or Army civilian employees, for example—rather than individuals.
- It emphasizes prevention of disease, injury, and disability, rather than healing those who have already experienced these conditions.
- It is proactive, optimizing health by educating members of the Army population about healthy behaviors, empowering them to build and sustain their own good health.

== Criticism ==
In May, 2022 former Army Public Health Center Commander Lt. Mark Bashaw was convicted of violating orders to present a COVID-19 test to his superiors, to wear a mask indoors and to telework at the Aberdeen Proving Ground in Maryland. The presiding judge declined to sentence him. Bashaw was subsequently joined by senior officers of all branches of the military in notifying Congress on August 15 that the Department of Defense is engaging in illegal and fraudulent acts that are endangering Service members and their families, as well as the American public whom the DOD is charged with protecting.
