= Moonbase Alpha =

2010 video game

- Developers: Virtual Heroes; Army Game Studio
- Publisher: NASA Learning Technologies
- Engine: Unreal Engine 3
- Platform: Microsoft Windows
- Release: WW: July 6, 2010
- Genre: Simulation
- Modes: Single-player, multiplayer

Moonbase Alpha is a simulation video game based on potential Moon base programs. It was made by the Army Game Studio, developers of America's Army, and Virtual Heroes, Inc. in conjunction with NASA Learning Technologies. The game was released on July 6, 2010, as a free download on Steam. At the Interservice/Industry Training, Simulation and Education Conference in 2010, the game won the top honors in the government category of the Serious Game Showcase & Challenge.

Moonbase Alpha remains available on Steam, and a modified version has been playable at an exhibit at the Museum of Science and Industry in Tampa, Florida since 2012.

== Gameplay ==
Moonbase Alpha is a three-dimensional simulation game playable either as single-player or multi-player with up to six players. The player controls an astronaut who must repair or replace equipment damaged by a nearby meteor impact in an outpost on the Moon within a limited amount of time. The player uses a welding torch or a wrench; however, they can only carry one tool. The player repairs equipment by doing mini-games; for instance, welding repairs are done by tracing circuit lines.

The size of the game map varies by the number of players in a server. A time limit of 25 minutes is set to repair the outpost, although this time limit can be turned off.

Players can control a repair robot that carries a welding torch or a holding arm to make repairs in inaccessible areas. Repair robots can only be controlled through a console within a range limit. Players can also drive a lunar rover to travel across the map.

== Plot ==
Moonbase Alpha is set in the year 2025. As a meteor impact damages an outpost near the Moon's South Pole, the player must take control of a member of the outpost's research team and repair the outpost to save the personnel on board before they asphyxiate within 25 minutes. These tasks include repairing vital components of the life support system, solar panel array and oxygen units, and can be accomplished with a wide variety of tools ranging from robotic repair units to the lunar rover.

== Development and release ==
Moonbase Alpha was designed as a precursor to Astronaut: Moon, Mars and Beyond, NASA's massively multiplayer online game that was never released. The game intended to encourage interest in space exploration in young children. Because the game is meant to be a collaborative effort, the repair mission can be conducted by six players with an additional six observers. An online leaderboard is included, encouraging players to use teamwork to help repair the station faster and earn high rankings.

The game was designed using the Unreal Engine 3. NASA announced in December 2009 that a demo of the game would be available on Steam in January 2010. In June 2010, the game was announced for a release date on July 6, 2010.

== Reception ==
Moonbase Alpha was released to mixed reception. Gameplanet gave the game a score of 6/10, feeling that it was too short and needed more diverse missions, but noted that it was still quite well-made for a free game. Common Sense Media said the game "shows students practical challenges of space", but that it was held back by poor introductory tutorials.

Moonbase Alpha also spawned a meme surrounding the DECtalk text-to-speech functionality within its internal chat system, where users would spam certain nonsensical phrases and words into its chat rooms, parsed by the TTS system in a humorous manner.
