= United States Army Medical Research Unit-Brazil =

Former U.S. Army Medical Research Unit stationed in Brazil

The United States Army Medical Research Unit-Brazil (USAMRU-B) was a "Special Foreign Activity" of the Walter Reed Army Institute of Research headquartered in Rio de Janeiro, Brazil with several satellite labs in the Brazilian hinterland. Both American and Brazilian scientists worked at the unit which was created in 1973 and closed in 1997.

USAMRU-B operated under a cooperative agreement with the Instituto de Biologia do Exercito (IBEX, the “Institute of Biology of the Brazilian Army”). USAMRU-B collaborated on research with IBEX, the PAHO, University of Espírito Santo, Vitória, and the Instituto de Medicine Tropical do Amazonas to investigate infectious diseases in the Brazilian Amazon. Much of the research done at USAMRU-B focused on tropical diseases, such as malaria, leishmaniasis, dengue, leptospirosis, hantaviruses, rickettsia and enteropathogens as well as other emerging infectious diseases. Its decommissioning came as the result of political difficulties between US and Brazilian military leadership.

== See also ==
- United States Army Medical Research Unit-Kenya, now known as United States Army Medical Research Directorate-Africa.
- United States Army Medical Research Unit-Europe (USAMRU-E), now deactivated.
