= United States Army Medical Materiel Agency =

US Army unit for medical acquisitions

U.S. Army Medical Materiel Agency
- USAMMA emblem
- Active: 1943–2026
- Country: United States
- Branch: United States Army
- Type: Agency
- Size: 300 employees (2025)
- Part of: U.S. Army Medical Logistics Command
- Garrison/HQ: Fort Detrick, Maryland
- Decorations: Superior Unit Award
- Website: www.amlc.army.mil/USAMMA

Commanders
- Current commander: Col. Joselito "Joe" Lim

The United States Army Medical Materiel Agency (USAMMA) Was responsible for the maintenance and logistics functions of the Army's medical equipment and supplies. USAMMA is a component of the U.S. Army Medical Logistics Command, and is headquartered on Fort Detrick, Maryland.

USAMMA ceased operations On July 31, 2026.

== History ==
USAMMA's origin is traced to the early part of World War II, when the Army surgeon general recognized the need to develop Army medical materiel support for the rapidly expanding mobilization forces.

The genesis of USAMMA began in 1943 when the Procurement Division of the Supply Service, Office of the Surgeon General (OTSG), was renamed the Purchase Division and transferred to the Army Medical Purchasing Office in Manhattan, New York City. Later that year, the Inventory Control Branch, Distribution and Requirements Division, OTSG, was also transferred to the Army Medical Purchasing Office. The Medical Testing Laboratory transferred from Binghamton, New York, in February 1943. Later that year, the Contract Termination Branch was added. In 1944, the Renegotiation and Stock Control Divisions were moved from the OTSG to New York.

On 21 May 1953, the office was organized in Brooklyn, New York City, and was assigned to the Army surgeon general. On 30 April 1955, the unit was re-designated as the Army Medical Supply Control Office. On 1 January 1957, the office was re-designated as the Army Medical Supply Support Activity, a Class II activity of the Army surgeon general.

On 2 April 1965, the activity relocated from Brooklyn, New York, to Valley Forge General Hospital in Phoenixville, Pennsylvania. The activity was renamed as the U.S. Army Medical Materiel Agency (USAMMA), effective 15 April 1965.

=== Establishment of Army Health Services Command ===
In April 1973, the U.S. Army Health Services Command (HSC) was established, which consolidated the operational elements of the Office of the Surgeon General. As part of the reorganization, the U.S. Army Medical Optical and Maintenance Agency was transferred from the Academy of Health Sciences to USAMMA on 1 February 1973.

In 1974, the USAMMA relocated to Fort Detrick, Maryland.

The USAMMA Medical Test and Evaluation Division was transferred to the U.S. Army Health Services Command (HSC) in October 1978. This transfer provided the nucleus for what is now the Army Medical Department Board. Also in October 1978, the USAMMA Procurement Division was transferred to the newly established U.S. Army Medical Research Acquisition Activity (USAMRAA), located at Fort Detrick, Maryland.

=== Establishment of Army Medical Command ===
In October 1994, USAMMA was placed under the newly formed U.S. Army Medical Research and Materiel Command (MRMC), a component of the similarly new U.S. Army Medical Command (MEDCOM).

=== Transfer to Army Medical Logistics Command ===
On 1 June 2019, the USAMMA transferred from MRMC to the newly established U.S. Army Medical Logistics Command (AMLC). Logistics functions of MRMC were separated into the AMLC, while research functions of MRMC transferred under U.S. Army Futures Command (AFC), becoming the U.S. Army Medical Research and Development Command (MRDC).

The USAMMA Medical Maintenance Management Directorate became a directorate of AMLC headquarters on 1 October 2025. The USAMMA is projected to cease operations in July 2026.

== Operations ==
The USAMMA manages strategic programs across the globe; it equips and sustains the medical force within the Active Army, Army Reserve, and Army National Guard components; and, it develops medical technologies/devices/materiel innovations for use across the battlefield and at fixed medical treatment facilities (MTFs). The agency also centrally manages the Army Prepositioned Stocks (APS) and the Office of the Surgeon General's (OTSG's) contingency programs, as well as other readiness support programs designed for all Army components during full spectrum operations. The agency deploys medical logistics support teams (MLST) and/or forward repair activity-medical (FRA-M) as required, to support joint operations in the different theaters.

The agency also provides Army Medical Department National Maintenance Program expertise and Sustainment Maintenance technical proficiency, ensuring that USAMMA provides: medical maintenance support and meeting of training requirements, equipment reliability and maintainability, and the maintenance/repair services of medical equipment and technologies.

=== Locations ===
In addition to USAMMA headquarters at Fort Detrick, Maryland, the USAMMA has operational maintenance and storage operations at the following locations:

- Camp Carroll, South Korea,
- Sagami General Depot, Japan,
- Defense Depot Tracy, California,
- Sierra Army Depot, California,
- Defense Depot Hill, Utah,
- Tobyhanna Army Depot, Pennsylvania,
- Naval Weapons Station Charleston, South Carolina,
- Husterhoeh Kaserne, Pirmasens, Germany,
- As Sayliyah Army Base, Qatar, and
- Camp Arifjan, Kuwait.

== Organization ==
As of 2008, USAMMA consisted of:

Project managers

- Project Manager, Integrated Clinical Systems
- Project Manager, Medical Devices

== Commanders of USAMMA and its precursors ==
No.	Name	Dates of Tenure	Military Rank
1	Alfred R. Cannon	1942–1943	Captain
2	Ellsworth W. Pohl	1943–1945	Major
3	Leonard H. Beers	1945 - 1945	Major
4	C. Bower	1945–1946	Lieutenant Colonel
5	Clark B. Williams	1946 - 1946	Colonel
6	George T.O. Reilly	1946 - 1946	Lieutenant Colonel
7	Augustus J.D. Guenther	1946–1947	Lieutenant Colonel
8	Alfred R. Cannon	1947 - 1947	Major
9	John H. Trenholm	1947–1950	Major
10	Bernard J. Kotte	1950–1951	Colonel
11	Alfred R. Cannon	1951–1953	Lieutenant Colonel
12	John J. Zurchur III	1953–1955	Lieutenant Colonel
13	Eli E. Daman	1955–1956	Colonel
14	Jesse N. Butler	1956–1959	Colonel
15	Edward J. Anderson, Jr.	1959–1962	Lieutenant Colonel
16	Alfred G. Emond	1962–1965	Lieutenant Colonel
17	Harry T. Whitaker	1965–1966	Lieutenant Colonel
18	Russell E. Julian	1966–1969	Colonel
19	F. Bruce Wells	1969–1973	Colonel
20	Fred L. Walter	1973–1975	Colonel
21	Frank W.B. Axtens	1975–1977	Colonel
22	James C. Huff, Jr.	1977–1983	Colonel
23	Lawrence J. Ryan	1983–1985	Colonel
24	Leon L. Holland	1985–1988	Colonel
25	Philip E. Livermore	1988–1990	Colonel
26	Mack C. Hill	1990–1992	Colonel
27	Richard I. Donahue	1992–1994	Colonel
28	James P. Normile	1994–1996	Colonel
29	Daryl W. Lloyd	1996–1998	Colonel
30	James J. Canella	1998–2000	Colonel
31	Roger W. Olsen	2000 - 25 May 2000	Lieutenant Colonel (Promotable)
32	David W. Williams	25 May 2000 - 2002	Colonel
33	Michael D. Daley	2002 - 18 June 2004	Colonel
34	William R. Fry	18 June 2004 - 22 September 2006	Colonel
35	Timothy E. Lamb	22 September 2006 - 15 August 2008	Colonel
36	Jeffrey Unger	15 August 2008 - 13 August 2010	Colonel
37	Gregory Evans	13 August 2010 - 20 July 2012	Colonel
38	Alejandro Lopez-Duke	20 July 2012 - July 2014	Colonel
39	David Gibson	July 2014 - 5 August 2016	Colonel
40	Lynn E. Marm	5 August 2016 - 10 August 2018	Colonel
41	Timothy Walsh	10 August 2018 - 2020	Colonel
42	Ryan Bailey	2020-2022	Colonel
43	Gary Cooper	2022 - 09 August 2024	Colonel
44	Joselito (Joe) Lim	09 August 2024- 31 July 2026	Colonel
