= Pilot Bioproduction Facility =

Pilot scale vaccine production organization

Coordinates: 39.0058°N 77.0527°W

The Pilot Bioproduction Facility of the Walter Reed Army Institute of Research (WRAIR) is a Contract Manufacturing Organization (CMO) facility whose mission is to perform vaccine production on a pilot scale. The facility produces pre-license Phase I vaccine candidates under cGMP conditions using both bacterial and viral based technology. It is located at the Forest Glen Annex of the Walter Reed Army Institute of Research in Silver Spring, Maryland. Its business methodology is to work with government agencies through interagency agreements and with private companies through CRADAs (Cooperative Research and Development Agreements) in order to produce vaccine candidates. Its manufacturing capabilities include bacterial and viral seed banking, fermentation, purification (bacterial and viral proteins), and aseptic filling. The facility can perform whole campaigns from beginning to end or any individual function listed above under GMP conditions. The facility also has the capability to perform different viral titer assays on a contracted basis. The Facility has a Type V Facility Master File on file with the U.S. Food and Drug Administration.

The facility was founded in 1953. The inhouse capabilities of the facility allow them to rapidly produce vaccines to be used in preclinical studies. Among them include vaccines targeted towards the Zika virus and COVID-19.

== See also ==
- Women's Interagency HIV Study
- Swine flu
