= Makerere University Walter Reed Project =

Research organisation in Uganda

Coordinates: 0.3283°N 32.5765°E

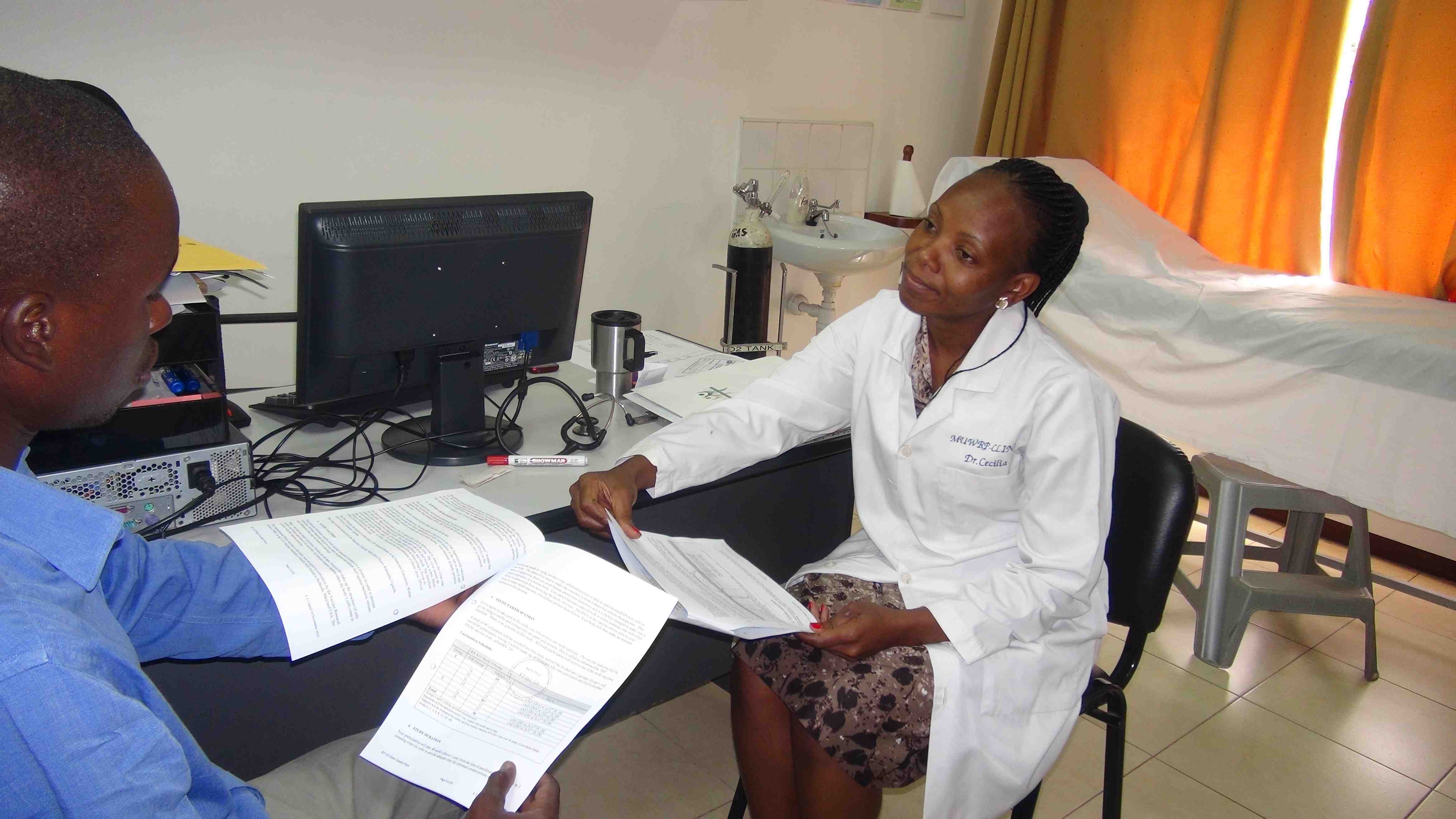
Physician at Makerere University Walter Reed Project in Uganda discussing the Ebola vaccine

Makerere University Walter Reed Project (MUWRP) was established in 2002 for the primary purpose of HIV vaccine development and building of vaccine testing capability in Uganda. It is one of the 5 international research sites established by the Department of Defense (DoD) United States HIV Research Program (MHRP), a program centered at the Walter Reed Army Institute of Research (WRAIR) in Silver Spring, Maryland. MUWRP's main facility is centrally located in Kampala, near the Makerere University College of Health Sciences where the MUWRP laboratory is located. The main facility includes the clinic, administrative, and data offices.

== Mission statement ==
To monitor and investigate communicable disease threats of public health importance to Uganda; and develop, evaluate and provide interventions to mitigate these disease threats.

== Background ==
In May 1998, the Honorable Crispus Kiyonga, the former Ugandan Minister of Health formally invited the US Army to conduct HIV and malaria research within Uganda. A program for vaccine research and development began in 1998 with the US Military HIV Research Program (MHRP) and the Henry M Jackson Foundation (HJF) forming a partnership with Makerere University. Initial collaborations were with the Rakai Project (currently the Rakai Health Sciences Program), a collaboration between Columbia University, Johns Hopkins University, Makerere University (MU), and the Uganda Virus Research Institute (UVRI) where the focus was the development of infrastructure and definition of cohorts. In June 2002 a memorandum of understanding between Makerere University and The Henry M. Jackson Foundation was signed establishing Makerere University Walter Reed Project (MUWRP) as a non-profit partnership for purposes of conducting collaborative HIV and other research studies. Since 1998, collaborative HIV research between Makerere University and the USMHRP has focused on development of infrastructure, definition of cohorts, acquisition of appropriate products for evaluation, and clinical evaluation of these products. The core of the Makerere University Walter Reed Program's effort has been to accomplish all activities required for initiation of phase III trials.

A key component of these activities has been provision of HIV care including anti-retroviral treatment (ARV) through funding under the PEPFAR Program. Since 2007, MUWRP has broadened its scope of work to address other communicable disease threats as well. In 2007, MUWRP joined with the DoD Global Emerging Infections Surveillance and Response System (GEIS) operated by the United States Army Institute of Research – Kenya (USARMR-K) to support Avian Influenza Pandemic Influenza (AIPI) surveillance activities in Uganda. This DoD-GEIS program was established in 1996 to strengthen the prevention of, surveillance of and response to emerging infectious diseases. The current MUWRP program supports surveillance of influenza and other emerging infections in animals and humans and collaborates with the Makerere University College of Veterinary Medicine Animal Resources and Bio-security (COVAB), Ministry of Health, Nature Uganda, CDC, USAID, the MU School of Public Health, St. Jude Children's Hospital, Memphis and the Uganda People's Defence Forces (UPDF).

In 2013 MUWRP agreed to support the Austere environment Consortium for Enhanced Sepsis Outcomes (ACESO). ACESO is composed of collaborators primarily from university, government and military-based institutions within the US and Uganda and aims to improve the survival of patients with severe infections by 1) developing evidence-based guidelines for management of clinical syndromes from severe infections; 2) increasing understanding of the pathogenesis and related host-mediated pathways associated with common and/or dangerous infectious agents; and 3) applying the research-based findings to improve outcomes in other less predictable clinical settings (such as an Ebola outbreak in Uganda).

== Activities ==
=== Vaccine studies ===
MUWRP has conducted a number of HIV vaccine trials and an Ebola/Marburg vaccine trial, all of which were conducted in accordance with GCP/ICH. Additionally, cohort studies have been conducted in the general population and among most at risk populations to establish HIV prevalence, incidence, risk behavior, cohort retention and host genetics and viral diversity for purposes of vaccine development and future vaccine testing. The vaccine research work is supported by a laboratory located on the Makerere University College of Health Sciences campus. The Lab was accredited by the College of American Pathologists (CAP) in June 2005 and continues to be recertified every two years (most recently until 2013). The lab has the clinical capacity for Safety labs, Diagnostic Serology and Polymerase Chain Reaction (PCR) Viral Load, Immunophenotyping and Peripheral Blood Mononuclear Cell (PBMC) processing, including cryopreservation. The MUWRP laboratory continues to provide training and research opportunities to many students from Ugandan universities and various research organizations throughout the country and also supports external research projects.

=== Pepfar ===
MUWRP has been working in Uganda in the provision of HIV care, treatment, and prevention services since 2005 to ensure sustainable, quality and comprehensive HIV services for communities that have participated or could participate in research studies. Due to the success of the initial program in Kayunga district and the recent in-country programming MUWRP's PEPFAR program now includes Mukono and Buvuma districts. Cross-cutting HIV programs include: expanding the number of HIV clinical sites, provision of efficient laboratory capacity, infrastructure remodeling, District-level data system strengthening, supply-chain management strengthening, human capacity development, innovative task shifting, youth-focused and most at risk programs, short-term technical staffing, comprehensive home-based Orphans and Vulnerable Children (OVC) services, and a variety of counseling and testing and prevention programs including medical male circumcision and mother to child prevention.

=== Emerging Infectious Diseases' Program ===
MUWRP has established capabilities for influenza surveillance that has since expanded to cover other emerging and re-emerging infectious. The human influenza surveillance is conducted at Mulago, the national referral hospital and Jinja and Gulu regional referral hospitals. The non-human component collects samples at various locations from water and domestic fowl and swine. The project renovated two BSL laboratories; one at the Uganda Virus Research Institute (UVRI) for the human samples and one at the Makerere University College of Veterinary Medicines Animal Resources and Biosecurity (COVAB) for animal samples. The surveillance activities are part of laboratory based influenza surveillance networks around the world, which serves to:

1. detect local influenza outbreaks,
2. provide isolates for the WHO vaccine pool for vaccine component and 3) detect any emerging strains that could be pandemic potential.
