= Armed Forces Research Institute of Medical Sciences =

US-Thailand military medical research project

Coordinates: 13.76656°N 100.53561°E

The Armed Forces Research Institute of Medical Sciences (AFRIMS) (Thai: สถาบันวิจัยวิทยาศาสตร์การแพทย์ทหาร) is a United States Army project that started as a collaboration with the Government of Thailand to fight a cholera outbreak in Bangkok in 1958 and 1959. It subsequently expanded to conduct military medical research, primarily involving infectious diseases, across much of Southeast Asia and the Indian subcontinent.

== Mission and history ==
The mission of the US Army Medical Component of the Armed Forces Research Institute of the Medical Sciences (USAMC-AFRIMS) is to conduct basic and applied research for development of diagnostic tests, drugs and vaccines for infectious diseases of military importance. First formed as the Southeast Asia Treaty Organization (SEATO) Laboratory following the 1956–1958 cholera pandemic, USAMC-AFRIMS is an agency of the US Embassy Thailand residing at the Royal Thai Army Medical Center in Bangkok. In 1977, it was renamed AFRIMS and it is a special foreign activity of the Walter Reed Army Institute of Research (WRAIR) and part of the United States Army Medical Research and Materiel Command (MRMC). AFRIMS is part of a global network of Department of Defense overseas medical research laboratories in Peru, Kenya, Egypt, and the Republics of Georgia and Singapore. USAMC-AFRIMS has nearly 300 staff members (predominantly Thai and US) and a research budget of approximately US$30–35 million annually.

The WRAIR-AFRIMS mission is to develop solutions against infectious diseases through research, strategic partnerships and the development of medical countermeasures all to optimize military readiness.

In 2009, the AFRIMS Retrovirology department successfully put the RV144 Prime-Boost HIV Vaccine on trail.

The AFRIMS integrates the Global Emerging Infections Surveillance and Response System (GEIS) from the Department of Defense (DoD). Through this integration, 80% of GEIS funding is provided, which was over $1 million in 2001. The $5 million to $7 million total annual AFRIMS budget comes not only from the GEIS but also from the Military Infectious Disease Research Program (MIDRP), the US National Institute of Health (NIH), the World Health Organization (WHO), HIV vaccine development and protection programs, as well as from different pharmaceutical and biotechnology companies.

== Research ==
The major infectious disease threats to soldiers in Southeast Asia include drug resistant malaria, diarrhea and dysentery, dengue fever, HIV, hepatitis, and scrub typhus. These agents pose health risks to soldiers as well as to the civilian population, and thus form the major areas of research at AFRIMS. Research is predominantly applied research aimed towards finding, developing and testing new drugs and vaccines. New medications currently under development are for the treatment and prevention of multiple drug resistant malaria. Vaccines for dysentery, dengue fever, hepatitis E and HIV are also under development at AFRIMS. Products originally field tested or developed at AFRIMS include Hepatitis A Vaccine, Japanese B Encephalitis Vaccine, doxycycline prophylaxis for malaria, mefloquine antimalarial drug prevention, and halofantrine antimalarial drug treatment. Many Southeast Asian maladies are referred to as “orphan diseases” as they are ignored by the pharmaceutical industry. AFRIMS' emphasis on orphan diseases addresses a gap in global health treatments.

AFRIMS also conducts surveillance of emerging diseases such as drug resistant P falciparum malaria, diarrhea agents: Campylobacter, Cholera O139, Cyclospora, E coli, Hepatitis E, HIV 1 E clade, drug resistant scrub typhus, dengue hemorrhagic fever, and influenza. AFRIMS has field sites across Thailand, Nepal, Cambodia, and the Republic of the Philippines, with ongoing collaboration in Bhutan, Mongolia, Vietnam, Laos, and Bangladesh. AFRIMS has a modern animal research facility, accredited by the Association for Assessment and Accreditation of Laboratory Animal Care International (AAALAC).
