= United States Army Medical Research Unit-Africa =

United States Army research directorate based in Kenya

The United States Army Medical Research Directorate-Africa (USAMRD-A) — previously known as the "U.S. Army Medical Research Unit-Kenya (USAMRU-K)" — is a "Special Foreign Activity" of the Walter Reed Army Institute of Research headquartered in Nairobi, Kenya.

The unit was established in 1969 and operates under a cooperative agreement with the Kenya Medical Research Institute. The unit conducts research on infectious diseases of military and global public health importance, including malaria, trypanosomiasis, and leishmaniasis, arboviruses, HIV/AIDS, and other emerging infectious diseases. USAMRD-A serves as the headquarters for a network of research laboratories across Africa.

== See also ==
- United States Army Medical Research Unit-Brazil (USAMRU-B)
- United States Army Medical Research Unit-Europe (USAMRU-E)
- Makerere University Walter Reed Project (MUWRP)
