= United States Army Medical Research and Development Command =

U.S. Army's developer of medical materiel

Medical Research and Development Command
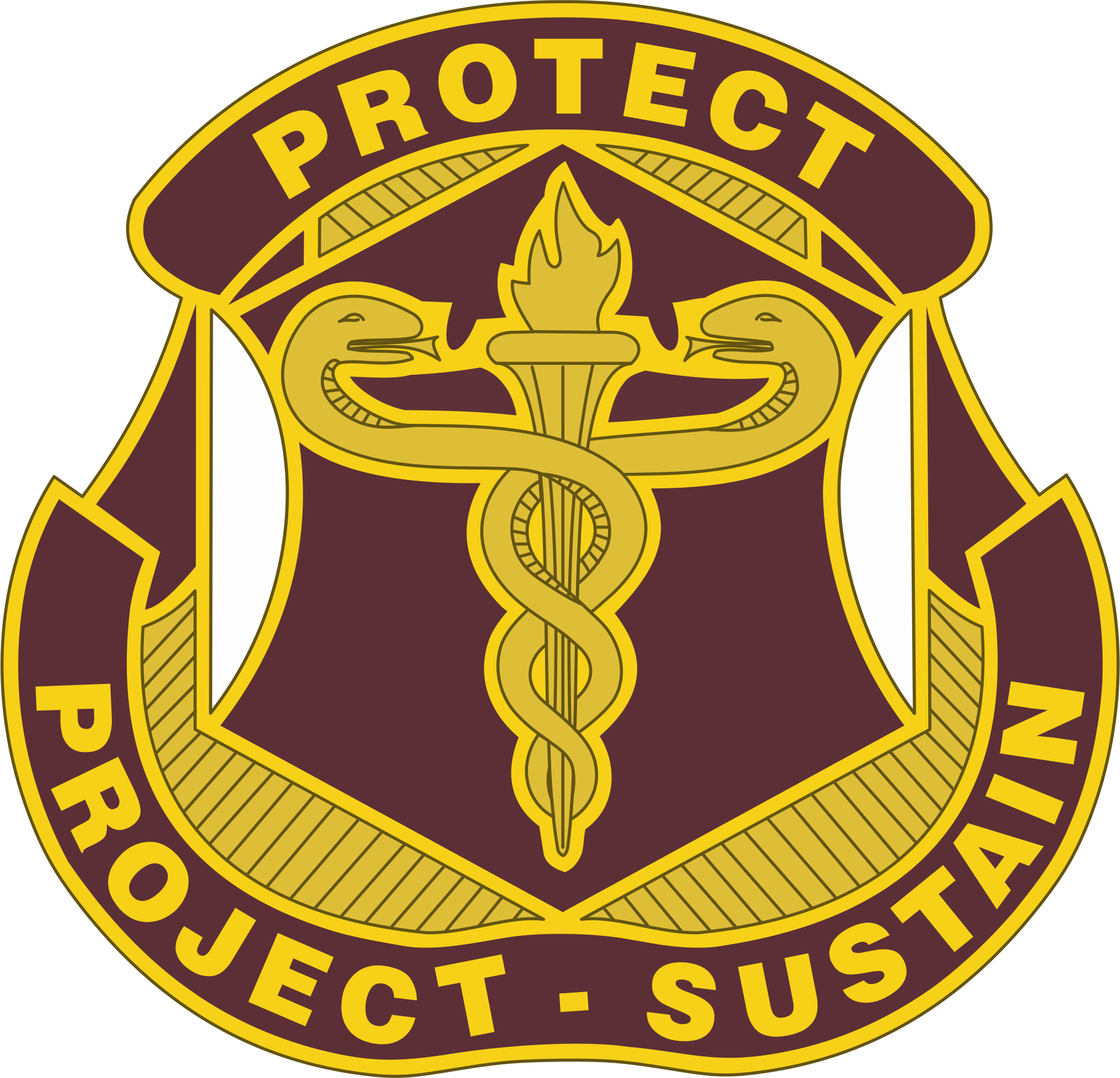
- USAMRDC distinctive unit insignia
- Active: 1994–present
- Country: United States
- Branch: United States Army
- Type: Medical R&D Command
- Part of: United States Army Futures and Concepts Command
- Garrison/HQ: Fort Detrick, Maryland
- Mottos: "Protect, Project, Sustain"
- Decorations: Superior Unit Award
- Website: mrdc.health.mil

Commanders
- Commanding General: MG Paula Lodi
- Command Sergeant Major: CSM Michael D. Dills
- Deputy to the Commanding General: Dr. Carrie M. Quinn

Insignia
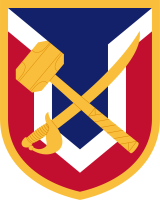
- Shoulder sleeve insignia of U.S. Army Futures and Concepts Command, worn by MRDC service members

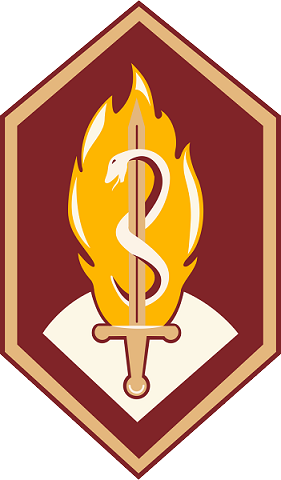
- Former shoulder sleeve insignia

The U.S. Army Medical Research and Development Command (USAMRDC) is the United States Army's medical materiel developer, responsible for medical research, development, and acquisition.

== Overview ==
USAMRDC's headquarters at Fort Detrick, Maryland, support subordinate commands worldwide. Its medical research laboratories and institutes focus on different areas of science and technology (S&T), such as biomedical research in infectious diseases, combat casualty care, operational medicine, clinical and rehabilitative medicine, chemical and biological defense, combat dentistry, and laser effects. The laboratories are staffed with skilled scientists and support personnel.

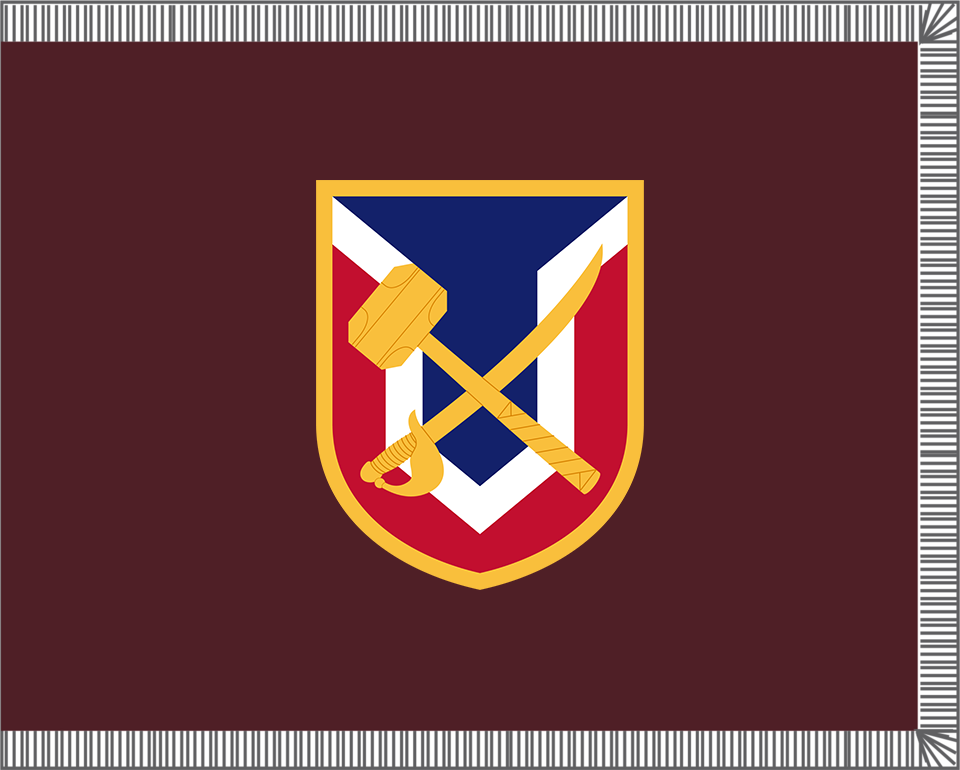
Medical Research and Development Command Flag

A large extramural research program and numerous cooperative research and development (R&D) agreements provide additional S&T capabilities by the leading R&D organizations in the civilian sector.

Five USAMRDC subordinate commands perform medical materiel advanced development, strategic and operational medical logistics, and contracting, to complete the lifecycle management of medical materiel.

About 6,000 military, civilian, and contractor personnel are assigned to support the headquarters and subordinate units. Officers, enlisted soldiers, and civilians-many of whom are among the most respected and knowledgeable specialists in their fields-provide subject matter expertise in medical, scientific, and technical areas throughout the command.

Medical information and products developed by USAMRDC protect and sustain the health and safety of the force through deployment and combat. The USAMRDC motto, "Protect, Project, Sustain," emphasizes the command's priorities in support of soldiers.

== History ==
In March 1994, a merger of the Medical Research and Development Command, the United States Army Medical Materiel Agency, and the Health Facilities Planning Agency resulted in creation of the Medical Research, Development, Acquisition and Logistics Command (MRDALC), subordinate to the then-provisional MEDCOM. The MRDALC was soon renamed the U.S. Army Medical Research and Materiel Command (USAMRMC).

Following a restructuring in 2019, the research and acquisition elements of USAMRMC were re-designated to Medical Research and Development Command and transferred to Army Futures Command.

USAMRDC is a component of the Defense Health Agency Research and Development, a subordinate organization of the Defense Health Agency.

== MRDC’s subordinate commands ==
At Fort Detrick:

- U.S. Army Medical Materiel Development Activity (USAMMDA)
- U.S. Army Medical Research Acquisition Activity (USAMRAA)
- U.S. Army Medical Research Institute of Infectious Diseases (USAMRIID)
- Telemedicine and Advanced Technology Research Center (TATRC)

Elsewhere:

- United States Army Aeromedical Research Laboratory (USAARL), Fort Rucker, Alabama
- United States Army Medical Research Institute of Chemical Defense (USAMRICD), Aberdeen Proving Ground, Maryland
- United States Army Research Institute of Environmental Medicine (USARIEM), Natick, Massachusetts
- United States Army Institute of Surgical Research (USAISR), Fort Sam Houston, Texas
- Walter Reed Army Institute of Research (WRAIR), Forest Glen Annex, Forest Glen, Maryland
  - WRAIR's Special Foreign Activities:
    - Armed Forces Research Institute of Medical Sciences (AFRIMS), Bangkok, Thailand
    - United States Army Medical Research Directorate-Africa (USAMRD-A), Nairobi, Kenya
    - United States Army Medical Research Directorate-Georgia (USAMRD-G), Tbilisi, Georgia
    - United States Army Medical Research Directorate-West (USAMRD-W), Joint Base Lewis–McChord, Washington

== Honors and awards ==
- General Maxwell R. Thurman Award
