= Forest Glen Annex =

Military research site in Maryland, United States

Coordinates: 39°0′21″N 77°3′10″W

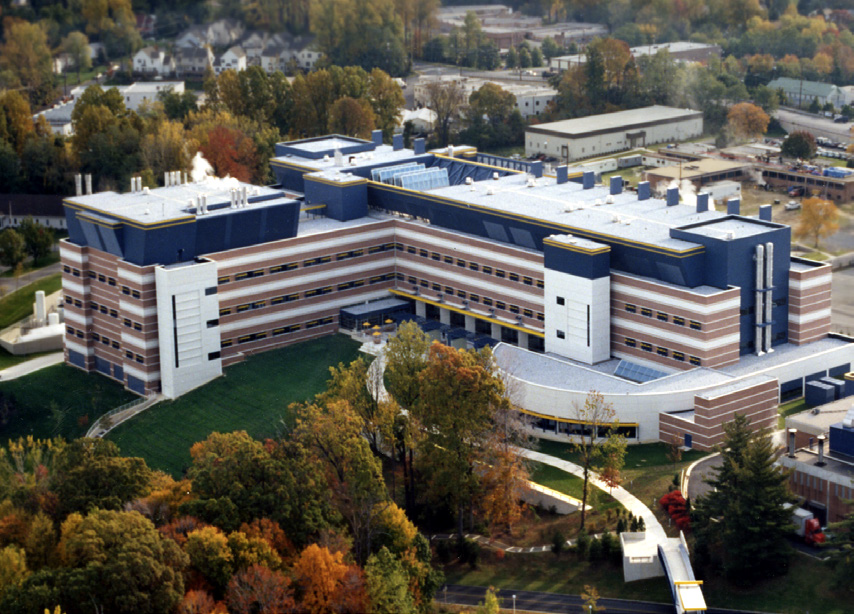
Daniel K. Inouye Building

The Forest Glen Annex is a 136-acre (0.55 km^{2}) U.S. Army installation in the Forest Glen Park neighborhood of Silver Spring, Maryland, United States. It is situated between Brookville Road and Linden Lane. Since 1999, the Annex has been the site of the Walter Reed Army Institute of Research (WRAIR) and the Naval Medical Research Center (NMRC), along with smaller units.

The Forest Glen property was acquired by the Army during the World War II era, and was formerly known as the “Walter Reed Forest Glen Annex”, a branch of the Walter Reed Army Medical Center (WRAMC) in Washington, DC.

== Facilities ==
In addition to the large research laboratories located in the Annex's "Daniel K. Inouye Building" (Building 503), the post includes a commissary, a child care center, and a Fisher House. There are also football and baseball fields, and picnicking facilities.

The Forest Glen Annex campus includes the 27-acre (110,000 m^{2}) National Park Seminary Historic District which is being redeveloped separately from the military area. The associated Glen Haven housing area in nearby Wheaton, also now owned by Fort Detrick, has 240 quarters for enlisted soldiers and for officers in grades O-1 through O-3.

== History ==
The land on which the Forest Glen Annex now stands was originally part of a huge tract belonging to the influential Carroll family of colonial times, which lived nearby. During the Civil War, the land was owned by Alfred Ray, a southern sympathizer. In July 1864, Ray allowed the troops of Confederate General Jubal Early to encamp on his land, before sallying down nearby Brookville Road for an unsuccessful raid on Washington, D.C., which ended in the Battle of Fort Stevens. Ray spent time in a federal prison for his action. During the period 1887 to 1894, the site was a short-lived hotel and casino, part of an ill-fated land development scheme. A prestigious finishing school, the National Park Seminary, occupied the site between 1894 and 1936, after which a women's junior college, the National Park College, was located there between 1937 and 1942.

With U.S. involvement in World War II, the Army's Walter Reed General Hospital needed more space for the convalescence and rehabilitation of returning veterans. Exerting its authority under the War Powers Act, it bought the “National Park College” for $800,000 in 1942. In addition, the Army bought a much larger area of over 100 acres (0.40 km^{2}) to the south of the school – then an operating dairy farm and a former tobacco plantation – which are now the operational portion of the installation.

From 1942 through 1977, the several buildings at the north end of the post housed the “Walter Reed Army Convalescent Center-Forest Glen Annex”, where Army providers treated soldiers wounded in Europe, Korea and Vietnam. Services included prosthetics, audiology, speech therapy, physical rehabilitation and a therapeutic art studio. The site was added to the National Register of Historic Places in 1972. When the last patient was discharged in 1977, the Army largely abandoned these buildings. In the late 1990s, U.S. Senator Paul Sarbanes directed that funds be used for site stabilization of the old National Park College. In 1999, the Army began taking formal steps to "excess" the area now known as the "National Park Seminary Historic District."

Authority over the facility was transferred on 1 October 2008 to the Installation Commander, Fort Detrick, Maryland.

In 2011, in accordance with the most recent Base Realignment and Closure (BRAC) recommendations, the Forest Glen Annex became home to the National Museum of Health and Medicine (NMHM) as well as a "Joint Center of Excellence in Infectious Disease Research." The former Army and Air Force Exchange Service (AAFES) post exchange was repurposed as office space and a new Navy Exchange (NEX) was opened at the nearby Walter Reed National Military Medical Center in Bethesda, Maryland.
