= International Vaccine Institute =

Independent, nonprofit, international organization

- Abbreviation: IVI
- Formation: October 9, 1997
- Founder: United Nations Development Programme
- Type: International organization
- Purpose: Discover, develop, and deliver safe, effective, and affordable vaccines for global public health.
- Headquarters: Seoul, Republic of Korea
- Members: 39 member states and the World Health Organization
- Director General: Jerome Kim, M.D.
- Budget: US$27 million(2017)
- Staff: 210
- Website: www.ivi.int

The International Vaccine Institute (IVI) is a non-profit, autonomous international organization established with the mandate of making vaccines available to all. Collaborating closely with the global scientific community, public health entities, governments, and industry stakeholders, IVI focuses on vaccine research and deployment. This includes conducting new vaccine designs in laboratories, advancing vaccine development and assessment in real-world settings, and facilitating the sustainable integration of vaccines in regions where they are most urgently required.

Initially conceived as an initiative under the auspices of the United Nations Development Program (UNDP), IVI transitioned into a fully-independent international entity in 1997, with its headquarters situated in Seoul, Republic of Korea. IVI currently has a membership comprising 39 states, with 33 signatories and 23 parties, alongside the endorsement of the World Health Organization (WHO) through its Establishment Agreement. Distinctively, IVI is mandated to concentrate exclusively on vaccine research and deployment tailored to populations in developing areas, with particular emphasis on combating diseases with a serious impact on public health in these regions.

== History ==
=== Background ===
In 1992, Dr. Seung-Il Shin, then Senior Health Advisor for the United Nations Development Program (UNDP), initiated a study to explore the feasibility of establishing an international institute devoted to vaccine research and development within the framework of the Children's Vaccine Initiative (CVI).

Based on the results of Shin's feasibility study, the UNDP adopted a formal proposal to establish the International Vaccine Institute (IVI) in 1993. In 1994, following a call for proposals to host IVI in the Asia Pacific region, the UNDP and the Republic of Korea reached an agreement to host the center in Seoul. In 1995, UNDP opened an interim IVI office on the campus of Seoul National University, and the Institute began its initial work and organizational development.

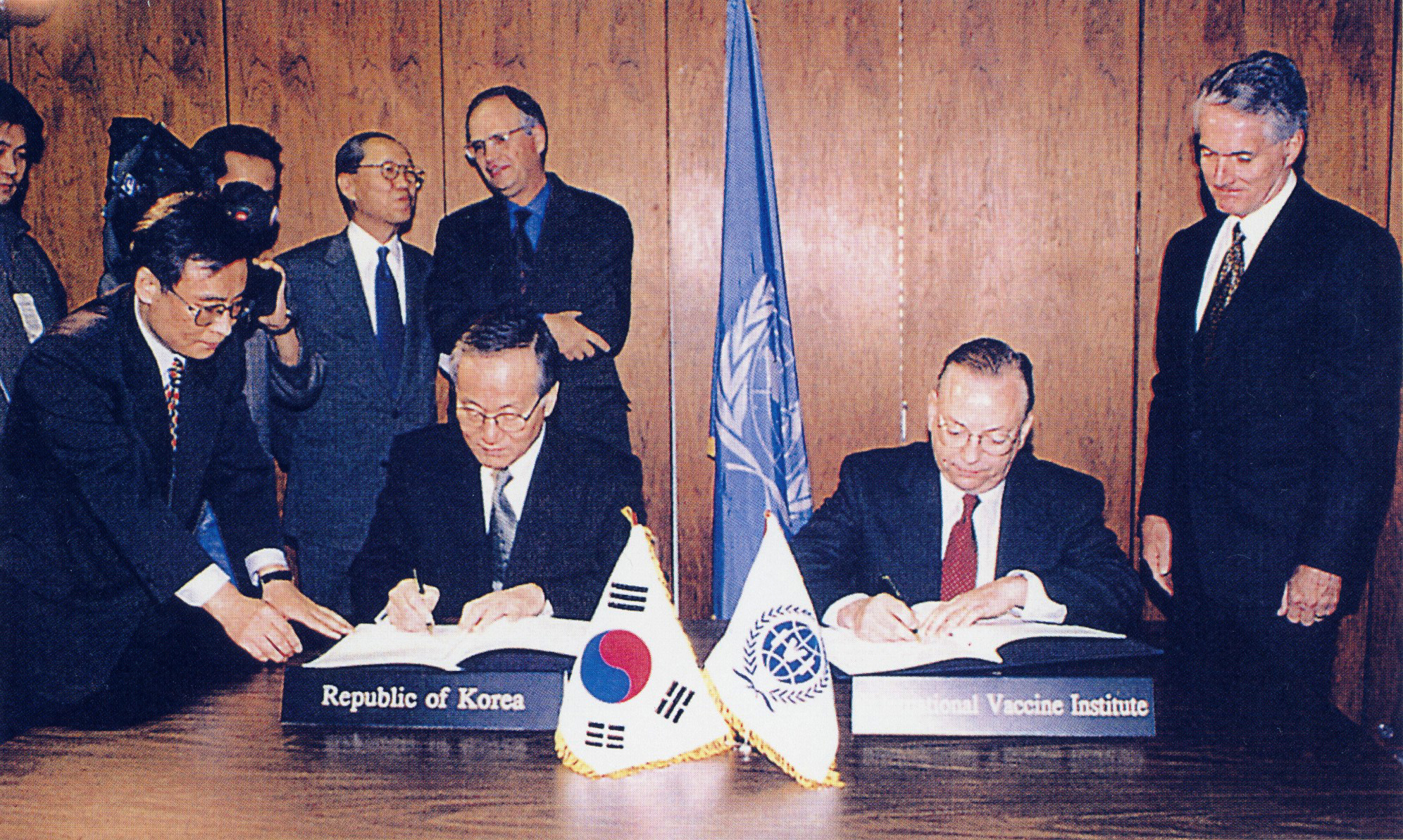
Signing of the IVI Establishment Agreement

=== Foundation ===
In 1995 and 1996, the UNDP and the South Korean government jointly developed the basic framework and Constitution of IVI. In order to establish IVI as an independent international organization, the UNDP and Korean government elected to establish the institute through an intergovernmental agreement of UN member states, as sanctioned in the Vienna Convention on the Laws of Treaties of 1969.

On October 28, 1996, the IVI Establishment Agreement opened for signatures at the UN headquarters in New York City. Representatives from Bangladesh, Bhutan, Indonesia, Kazakhstan, Mongolia, the Netherlands, Panama, Republic of Korea, Romania, Thailand, Vietnam, Uzbekistan, and the World Health Organization were the first to sign the agreement, followed shortly thereafter by Senegal and Philippines.

In 1997, more countries followed, with Brazil, China, Egypt, Israel, Jamaica, Kyrgyzstan, Myanmar, Nepal, Pakistan, Papua New Guinea, Peru, Sri Lanka, Sweden, Tajikistan, and Turkey signing the Agreement.

On May 29, 1997, The IVI Establishment Agreement entered into force following the submission of instruments of ratification by South Korea, Sweden, and Uzbekistan. The IVI Establishment Agreement entered the United Nations Depository of Treaties under Chapter IX. HEALTH, section 3.

On September 24, 1998, the IVI Headquarters Agreement was signed at a formal ceremony at UNDP headquarters by South Korea's Minister of Foreign Affairs and Trade, Hong Soon-Young and IVI Board Chairman, Dr. Barry Bloom. The Headquarters Agreement established IVI as a legal entity with diplomatic immunity in South Korea, becoming the first international organization to be headquartered in South Korea. In accordance with IVI's independent status, the Institute formally separated from the UNDP in 1998.

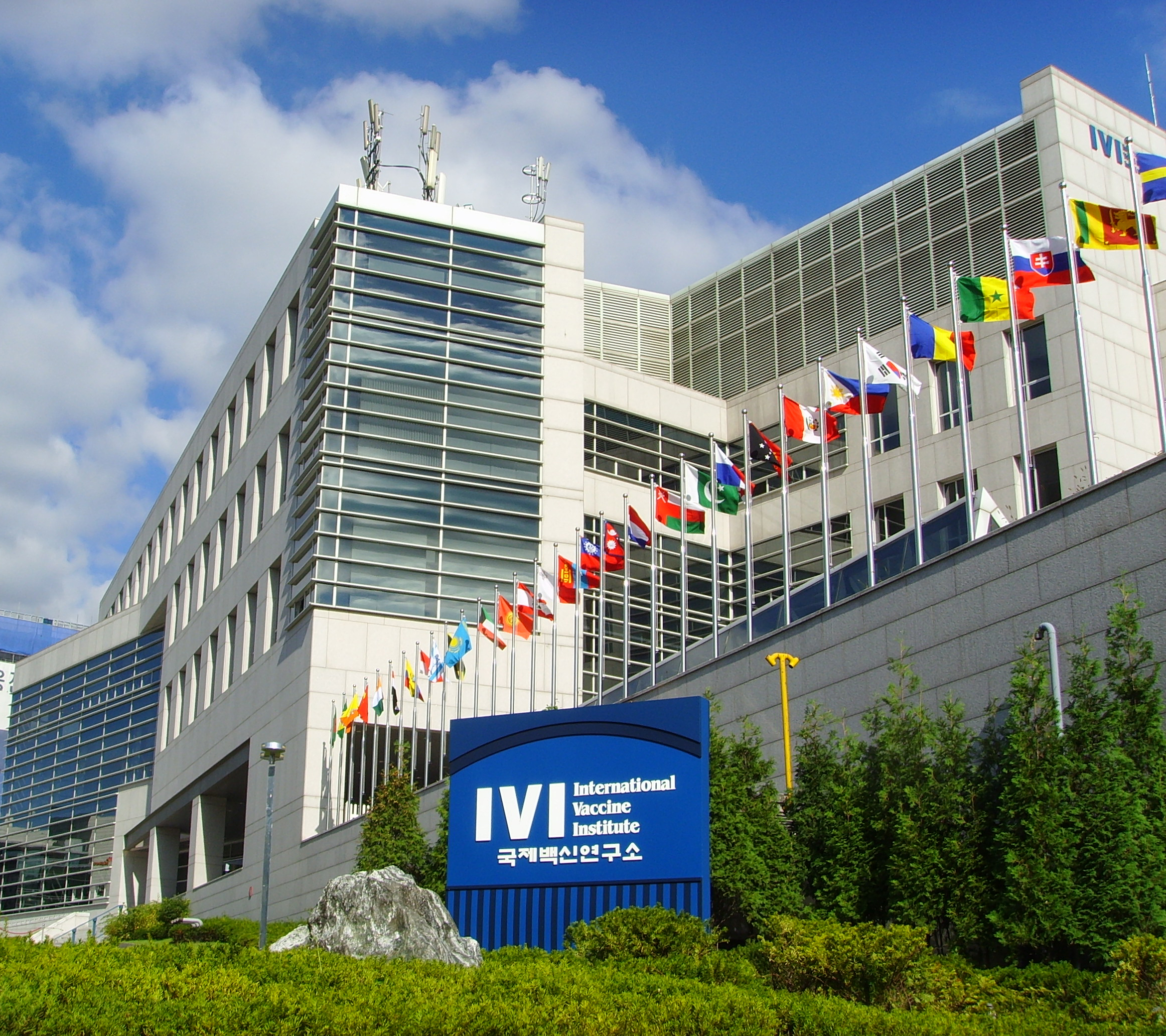
IVI Headquarters

=== Headquarters building ===
The IVI headquarters building, located in Seoul National University's Research Park in Seoul, South Korea, was designed by a consortium consisting of Samwoo Architects of South Korea and Payette Associates of Boston, United States. Construction began in 1998 and was completed in 2003. The building houses laboratories, animal facilities, offices, an auditorium, and a library. A separate 1,300m² pilot plant facility, intended for the production of test lots of vaccines for training and evaluation purposes, was constructed but never completed due to a lack of funding.

== Activities ==
=== Diseases of the Most Impoverished (DOMI) 2000-2006 ===
IVI's first major initiative, Diseases of the Most Impoverished (DOMI), was a program of research and technical assistance to accelerate the introduction of new vaccines against typhoid fever, cholera, and shigellosis into public health programs in developing countries. From 2000 to 2006, IVI's DOMI program carried out vaccination campaigns, disease surveillance, and research studies in Bangladesh, China, India, Indonesia, Mozambique, Pakistan, Thailand, and Vietnam. At the conclusion of the DOMI program, IVI synthesized the diverse epidemiological, clinical, economic, and behavioral findings of these studies in order to facilitate informed decision-making by policymakers at the national level on the use of vaccines against the diseases targeted by DOMI. The Bill and Melinda Gates Foundation was the primary funder of the DOMI program with a US$40 million contribution.

==== DOMI Typhoid ====
The DOMI Typhoid program was initiated to address the barriers of access to typhoid vaccines in the developing world and to accelerate the introduction of modern typhoid vaccines in countries where they were needed. DOMI Typhoid utilized the Vi-Polysaccharide (Vi-PS) vaccine because it is easily and inexpensively produced by manufacturers in developing countries, it is given in a single dose, and it is relatively thermostable. DOMI Typhoid operated in five study sites: Heichi, China; Kolkata, India; North Jakarta, Indonesia; Karachi, Pakistan; and Hue, Vietnam. From these sites, IVI experts conducted disease surveillance, disease burden studies, cost-of-illness studies, socio-behavioral studies, and vaccine demonstration projects. IVI presented the accumulated evidence from DOMI Typhoid in case studies to officials in each host country. As a result, policymakers in Pakistan, Indonesia, and Vietnam agreed to introduce school-based typhoid vaccination campaigns on a pilot basis. Results from China uncovered a previously unknown growing incidence rate of paratyphoid A infections in China's Guangxi province, which led to IVI launching its Paratyphoid in China project.

==== DOMI Cholera ====
The DOMI Cholera program sought to develop and accelerate the use of an affordable cholera vaccine in cholera-endemic countries. DOMI Cholera operated from five study sites: Matlab, Bangladesh; North Jakarta, Indonesia; Kolkata, India; Beira, Mozambique; and Hue, Vietnam. From these sites, IVI conducted disease burden, economic, and socio-behavioral studies and cholera vaccination campaigns. The studies found a high demand for cholera vaccine and high incidence rates (3-9/1,000) in children five years old and younger. IVI's vaccination campaign in Beira saw more than 44,000 children and adults receive the internationally licensed Dukoral vaccine. In Kolkata, IVI vaccinated more than 67,000 children and adults using an oral cholera vaccine produced by Vietnam's VaBiotech. At the onset of DOMI Cholera, the only internationally licensed cholera vaccine available was Dukoral, but at $90 for the two-dose series, this vaccine was too expensive for public use in many of the poorest developing countries. VaBiotech's cholera vaccine, originally developed by Vietnam's National Institute of Health and Epidemiology following a technology transfer from the University of Gothenburg in Sweden, was not licensed for international use but considered as a low-cost vaccine for the developing world. As a result, the Gates Foundation provided IVI with additional funding to establish the Cholera Vaccine Initiative (CVI) with the goal of reformulating the VaBiotech vaccine for international use.

==== DOMI Shigellosis ====
IVI established the DOMI Shigellosis program with the ultimate goal of accelerating the development and introduction of a safe and protective shigella vaccine to control epidemic and endemic disease. Between 2000 and 2004, the DOMI Shigella program ran disease surveillance sites in six locations across Southeast Asia: Dhaka, Bangladesh; Hebei, China; Karachi, Pakistan and neighboring villages; North Jakarta, Indonesia; Nha Trang, Vietnam; and Saraburi Province, Thailand. The program enhanced understanding of what an effective shigella vaccine will need and established an accurate disease burden in the countries where it operated. The program first evaluated an oral shigella vaccine (SC602) in Bangladesh, but it failed to elicit an immune response. The high disease burden, serotype diversity, and high levels AMR discovered at IVI's surveillance sites underscored the need for a vaccine that protects against all common strains of the disease. As a result, IVI's Division of Laboratory Sciences initiated a multiyear program to sequence the Shigella genome and identify common proteins in different Shigella species that could be used to develop a vaccine against all common strains of the disease.

=== Rotavirus Diarrhea Program 1999-2010 ===
IVI initiated the Rotavirus Diarrhea Program to provide policymakers in developing countries with the disease burden evidence and economic data needed to ensure the inclusion of rotavirus vaccines in their national immunization programs. Running from 1999 to 2010, the program conducted disease surveillance and economic studies in Cambodia, China, India, Indonesia, Laos, Mongolia, South Korea, Sri Lanka, and Vietnam. In 2007, in collaboration with Vietnam's National Institute of Hygiene and Epidemiology (NIHE), IVI conducted a Phase II trial of GSK's RotaRix rotavirus vaccine in Khanh Hoa, Vietnam. In 2009, in collaboration with NIHE, PATH, and Merck, IVI completed a Phase III trial of Merck's RotaTeq rotavirus vaccine in Nha Trang Vietnam, where it vaccinated 900 infants.

=== Dengue Vaccine Programs 2002-2016 ===
==== The Pediatric Dengue Vaccine Initiative (PDVI) ====
The Pediatric Dengue Vaccine Initiative was a product development partnership launched by IVI to accelerate the introduction of safe and effective dengue vaccines for children in dengue-endemic countries. From 2002 to 2010, PDVI operated in Brazil, Cambodia, Colombia, India, Indonesia, Laos, Malaysia, Mexico, Myanmar, Nicaragua, Sri Lanka, Thailand and Vietnam. PDVI made many contributions to dengue vaccine development, including:

- Development of a dengue vaccine partnership and global research network to develop, evaluate, and introduce dengue vaccines. Working with Brazil's Butantan Institute, the U.S. National Institute of Health, and Sanofi Pasteur, PDVI provided technical advice and support for the efficacy and clinical trials of their respective dengue vaccine candidates and established a consortium of field sites in dengue-endemic countries across Asia and the Americas.
- Establishment of two regional Dengue Prevention Boards in the Asia-Pacific region and the Americas to disseminate information and make recommendations regarding the control of dengue through immunization.
- Collaboration with the U.S. Centers for Disease Control and Prevention to develop a free user-friendly software, DenguEcon, which can be used by policymakers to determine the economic impact of dengue.

In 2010, PDVI transitioned into the Dengue Vaccine Initiative (DVI).

==== Dengue Vaccine Initiative (DVI) ====
The successor to PDVI, the Dengue Vaccine Initiative was an IVI-led consortium with the World Health Organization, the Sabin Vaccine Institute, the Initiative for Vaccine Research (IVR), and the International Vaccine Access Center (IVAC) at Johns Hopkins University. DVI continued the work of PDVI and focused on laying the groundwork for dengue vaccine decision-making and vaccine introduction in endemic areas. Each consortium member was responsible for a specific component: World Health Organization – information and guidance documents, and regulatory training activities; Johns Hopkins University – dengue vaccine financing and strategic demand forecasting; and Sabin Vaccine Institute – communications and advocacy. Besides leading the consortium, IVI generated evidence for decision-making such as disease burden, country vaccine introduction cases and a global investment case. From 2010 to 2016, DVI operated in Brazil, Burkina Faso, Cambodia, Colombia, Gabon, India, Kenya, Thailand, and Vietnam. From 2013 to 2015, with funding from Germany's Federal Ministry of Education & Research (BMBF), IVI continued support for preclinical development of dengue vaccines by Brazil's Butantan Institute and Vietnam's VaBiotech. After the 2016 licensure of Sanofi Pasteur's Dengvaxia vaccine, the DVI project came to a close and its IVI staff transitioned to a new project, the Global Dengue & Aedes-Transmitted Disease Consortium (GDAC).

== Organization ==
=== Signatory Countries of the IVI ===
As of January 2019, IVI includes 35 countries and the World Health Organization (WHO) as signatories to its Establishment Agreement: Bangladesh, Bhutan, Brazil, China, Ecuador, Egypt, India, Indonesia, Israel, Jamaica, Kazakhstan Kyrgyzstan, Lebanon, Liberia, Malta, Mongolia, Myanmar, Nepal, Netherlands, Oman, Pakistan, Panama, Papua New Guinea, Peru, Philippines, Republic of Korea, Romania, Senegal, Sri Lanka, Sweden, and the World Health Organization.

=== Partners ===
IVI partners with corporations, philanthropic organizations, foundations, governments and media organizations from around the world. Major partners include:

==== Academia ====
- Harvard University
- International Centre for Diarrhoeal Disease Research, Bangladesh
- Johns Hopkins Carey Business School
- Leiden University
- Seoul National University
- Technical University of Denmark
- Texas Tech University
- University of Antananarivo
- University of Cambridge
- University of Oxford
- University of Siena
- University System of Maryland
- Vaccine and Infectious Disease Organization
- Vaccine Innovative Technology Alliance Korea
- Yonsei University

==== Global Health ====
- Coalition for Epidemic Preparedness Innovations
- Food and Agriculture Organization
- Gavi, the Vaccine Alliance
- Research Investment for Global Health Technology Fund
- UNICEF
- World Health Organization
- World Organisation for Animal Health

==== Global Networks ====
- BactiVac Network
- Developing Countries Vaccine Manufacturers Network
- Global Health Security Agenda
- Global Health Technologies Coalition
- Global Task Force on Cholera Control
- Global Virus Network
- Joint External Evaluation Alliance
- Leading International Vaccine Education

==== Government ====
- Centers for Disease Control and Prevention (United States)
- European Commission
- Federal Ministry of Health (Germany)
- Fleming Fund
- Government of Gujarat (India)
- Korea Disease Control and Prevention Agency
- Korea International Cooperation Agency
- Ministry of Food and Drug Safety (South Korea)
- Ministry of Foreign Affairs (South Korea)
- Ministry of Health and Welfare (South Korea)
- Ministry of Social Affairs and Health (Finland)
- Ministry of Trade, Industry and Energy (South Korea)
- National Institute of Mental Health (United States)
- Swedish Armed Forces
- UK aid

==== Industry ====
- Bio Farma
- Celltrion
- Clover Biopharmaceuticals
- EuBiologics
- Genexine
- GlaxoSmithKline
- Gyeongbuk Institute for Bio Industry
- Incepta Pharmaceuticals
- Inovio Pharmaceuticals
- Instituto Butantan
- Merck
- Pfizer
- Sanofi
- Shantha Biotechnics
- Shift Health
- SK Bioscience
- Translational Health Science and Technology Institute
- Vabiotech

==== Philanthropy ====
- Bill & Melinda Gates Foundation
- Fondation Mérieux
- Korea Support Committee for IVI
- Samsung Life Public Welfare Foundation
- Wellcome Trust
- Yanghyun Foundation
