= Walter Reed Army Institute of Research =

Biomedical research facility administered by the U.S. Department of Defense

Coordinates: 39°0′18″N 77°3′14.5″W

- Emblem of WRAIR
- Active: 1953–present
- Country: United States
- Branch: United States Army
- Role: Military medical research and development
- Part of: U.S. Army Medical Research and Development Command
- Garrison/HQ: Forest Glen Annex, Maryland
- Website: wrair.health.mil

Commanders
- Commander: COL Brianna Perata
- Command Sergeant Major: CSM Monnet R. Bushner

The Walter Reed Army Institute of Research (WRAIR) is the largest biomedical research facility administered by the U.S. Department of Defense (DoD). The institute is centered at the Forest Glen Annex, in the Forest Glen Park part of the unincorporated Silver Spring urban area in Maryland just north of Washington, DC, but it is a subordinate unit of the U.S. Army Medical Research and Development Command (USAMRDC), headquartered at nearby Fort Detrick, Maryland. At Forest Glen, the WRAIR has shared a laboratory and administrative facility — the Sen Daniel K. Inouye Building, also known as Building 503 — with the Naval Medical Research Center since 1999.

The Institute takes its name from Major Walter Reed, MD (1851–1902), the Army physician who, in 1901, led the team that confirmed the theory that yellow fever is transmitted by a particular mosquito species, rather than by direct contact. Today, the WRAIR fosters and performs biomedical research for the DoD and the US Army. It has recently developed two modern "Centers of Excellence" in the fields of military psychiatry/neuroscience and infectious disease research. The Centers focus, respectively, on soldier fitness, brain injury, and sleep management and in the development of vaccines and drugs for prevention and treatment of such diseases as malaria, HIV/AIDS, dengue fever, wound infections, leishmaniasis, enteric diseases.

== Official mandate ==
Basic and applied medical research supporting U.S. military operations is the focus of WRAIR leaders and scientists. Despite the focus on the military, however, the institute has historically also addressed and solved a variety of non-military medical problems prevalent in the United States and the wider world.

== Divisions and Subordinate Units of the WRAIR ==
=== Divisions at the Daniel K. Inouye Building ===
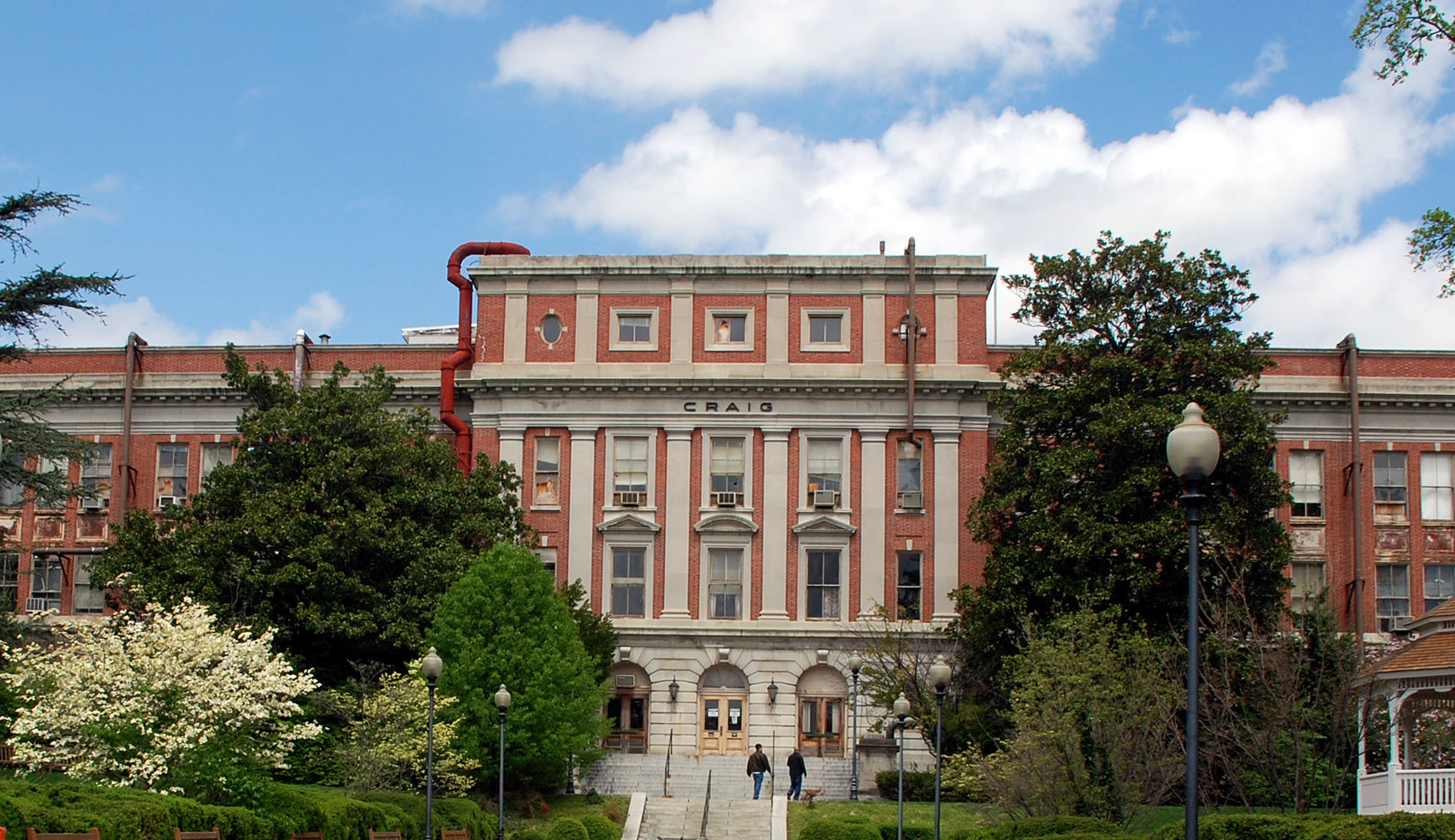
"Building 40" of the Walter Reed Army Medical Center complex, Washington, DC — home to the WRAIR from 1953 to 1999.

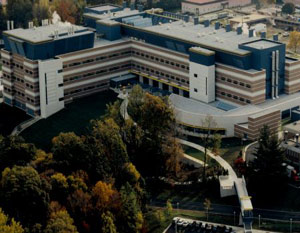
The "Daniel Inouye Building" (Building 503), Forest Glen Annex, Silver Spring, Maryland — home to the WRAIR since 1999.

The Walter Reed Army Institute of Research hosts two Centers of Excellence for Military Psychiatry and Neuroscience and for Infectious Disease Research which are headquartered in Silver Spring, Maryland.

Center for Military Psychiatry and Neuroscience

- Behavioral Biology
- Blast Induced Neurotrauma
- Brain Trauma Neuroprotection and Neurorestoration
- Military Psychiatry
- Research Transition Office

Center for Infectious Disease Research

- Bacterial Diseases
- Emerging Infectious Diseases
- Entomology Program
- United States Military HIV Research Program
  - Makerere University Walter Reed Project (MUWRP)
- Military Malaria Research Program
- Preventive Medicine Program
- Viral Diseases

Office of Science Education and Strategic Communications:

- Research Marketing
- Gains in Education of Mathematics & Science (GEMS)

Students in 7th to 12th grade get an opportunity to participate in an internship for one to four weeks in an Army laboratory and learn technical skills. Advanced courses in subsequent years build upon prior experience.

- Science & Engineering Apprentice Program (SEAP)

A cooperative education (work/study) program for high school students looking at a possible career in science and engineering. The program offers hands-on experience and mentoring in Army research and development activities in an actual Army laboratory.

- Science & Engineering Apprentice Program-College Qualified Leaders (SEAP-CQL)

Paid internships for undergraduates seeking experience in Army research.

The WRAIR supports and collaborates on all other Army Educational Research Programs including the Mobile Discovery Center, the Junior Solar Spring, eCybermission, Uninitiates Introduction to Engineering (UNITE), Research & Engineering Apprentice Program (REAP), International Science & Engineering Fair (INTEL-ISEF), Internships Science & Engineering Program (ISEP), Junior Science & Humanities Symposium (JSHS), Women in Science Project (WISP), Career Related Experience in Science & Technology (CREST), Consortium Research Fellows Program (CRFP), and Science, Mathematics and Research for Transformation Defense Scholarshop for Service Program (SMART).

Research Support:

- Preventive Medicine and Pathology
- Pilot Bioproduction Facility
- Clinical Trials Center
- Veterinary Medicine
- Division of Human Subjects Protection
- DMAVS, Library and Statistical Services
- Information Management
- Logistics
- Office of Quality Activities
- Operations and Security
- Personnel
- Resource Management
- Safety

=== WRAIR Pilot Bioproduction Facility ===
The Pilot Bioproduction Facility (PBF) was established in 1958 as the Department of Biologics Research and is now located at the Walter Reed Army Institute of Research. The PBF mission is research, development, production, and testing of vaccines for human use. The PBF at the Forest Glen Annex is a multi-use facility designed and operated for production of vaccines in compliance with the current Good Manufacturing (cGMP) regulations. Compliance with cGMP ensures that products prepared in the facility will be safe, potent, and reproducible.

Since inception, the PBF has specialized in developing vaccines for Department of Defense mission-related disease threats. The PBF follows all federal regulations that apply to biological products and has expertise in the development and production of vaccines for the prevention of a variety of infectious diseases. Projects for public and private partners are accomplished through inter-agency and cooperative agreements.

Vaccines are produced that will protect Soldiers against diseases that they might encounter in areas of deployment. These include vaccines to prevent dengue fever, malaria, meningitis, cholera, shigellosis, hepatitis A, and HIV. The PBF places compliance, cleanliness, and safety as top priorities in the production process of a vaccine. Once the vaccine is tested for safety, potency, and identity, the vaccine is released for use in approved human clinical studies. Several of the PBF's experimental vaccines have progressed on to advanced clinical testing.

=== Global Platforms ===
- United States Army Medical Research Directorate - West (USAMRD-W)
- United States Army Medical Research Directorate-Africa (USAMRD-A)
- United States Army Medical Research Unit-Brazil (USAMRU-B) (decommissioned in 1997)
- United States Army Medical Directorate-Armed Forces Research Institute of Medical Sciences (USAMD-AFRIMS)
- United States Army Medical Research Directorate - Georgia
- Makerere University Walter Reed Project (MUWRP)

== History of the WRAIR ==
The WRAIR traces its institutional heritage back to the Army Medical School, founded by U.S. Army Surgeon General George Sternberg in 1893, by some reckonings the first school of public health and preventive medicine in the world. (The other institution vying for this distinction is the Johns Hopkins School of Public Health, founded in 1916.) The organization name was officially changed to the Walter Reed Army Institute of Research in 1953.

=== Notable staff ===
- Robert J. T. Joy, Commander, U.S. Army Research Team (WRAIR), Vietnam, 1964–1965, Commander, WRAIR 1975–1976, Founding Faculty, Uniformed Services University of the Health Sciences
- Maurice Hilleman, famed vaccinologist, Chief of Dept of Respiratory Diseases (1948–57)
- David Rioch (1951–70), Neuropsychiatry Division
- Walle Nauta (1951–64), Neuropsychiatry Division
- Robert Galambos, Neuropsychiatry Division
- Joseph C. Sharp, Neuropsychiatry Division
- David H. Hubel (ca. 1954–58), Neuropsychiatry Division (later a Nobel Prize winner; invented the modern metal microelectrode while at WRAIR)
- Jerome Kim, Director General of the International Vaccine Institute
- Edward Perl (ca. 1953–54), Neuropsychiatry Division
- James S. Ketchum (1958–60), Neuropsychiatry Division
- Nelson Michael

== See also ==
- Naval Medical Research Center (NMRC), sister agency of WRAIR at Forest Glen
  - Naval Medical Research Unit Two, Naval Medical Research Unit Three and Naval Medical Research Unit Six, Singapore, Cairo and Lima
- Walter Reed Army Medical Center (WRAMC), formerly (1953–2008) the garrison/installation command for WRAIR
- U.S. Army Medical Research and Development Command (USAMRDC), WRAIR's higher command headquarters
- Walter Reed Tropical Medicine Course
