= United States Military HIV Research Program =

Military and medical program

The United States Military HIV Research Program (USMHRP or MHRP) was initiated by the United States Congress in 1986, in reaction to the threat of lost effectiveness of U.S./Allied troops due to HIV infection. The mission of MHRP is to develop an HIV-1 vaccine, provide prevention, care, and treatment, and conduct meaningful HIV/AIDS research for the global community through the President's Emergency Plan for AIDS Relief (PEPFAR). It is centered at the Walter Reed Army Institute of Research (WRAIR), and has established five international research sites in Africa and Asia (Tanzania, Kenya, Nigeria, Uganda, and Thailand). MHRP also partners with the Armed Forces Research Institute of Medical Sciences (AFRIMS) in Thailand. MHRP works closely with The Henry M. Jackson Foundation for the Advancement of Military Medicine (HJF), most notably in the development of the RV144 HIV vaccine in Thailand. MHRP is the largest research program supported by the HJF.

== Funding ==
The MHRP is a $175 million program which receives funding for research and treatment endeavors from the Department of Defense ($28 million), PEPFAR, and other organizations such as the Bill and Melinda Gates Foundation and the National Institute of Allergy and Infectious Diseases. Some of MHRP's collaborative vaccine-as-treatment research is funded by Janssen, a division of Johnson & Johnson. MHRP studies in combination approaches to HIV are made possible by a competitive grant that they competed for from a NIH-funded Martin Delaney Collaboratorive.

In 2012, a MHRP scientist named Dr. Gary R. Matyas proposed a vaccine to treat heroin addiction and prevent those who received this vaccine from contracting HIV. Matyas was awarded the NIDA Avant-Garde Award for Medications Development for this proposition, which gave him $1 million per year for five years to continue his research at MHRP on the dual vaccine.

== International vaccine research ==
The program's most notable contribution to HIV/AIDS medical research was the RV 144 vaccine study of over 16,000 volunteers in Thailand. In September 2009, the MHRP and the Thai Ministry of Health conducted the first successful HIV/AIDS vaccine trial to show effective prevention in humans, with a final prevention rate of 31%. Although the efficacy is modest, this trial is significant because it proved that it is possible to develop an HIV vaccine.

The breakthrough led to increased interest in research on RV144 and the foundation of partnerships such as the Pox-Protein Public-Private Partnership (P5), a mosaic of public and private entities that focus on building on the success of RV144. MHRP also provides study leadership, and is working with researchers around the globe to dissect the results from the RV144 trial and to design future clinical trials to translate a scientific milestone into an eventual public health tool. RV144 remains the only instance of successful preventative HIV vaccination.

MHRP scientists are also pursuing other strategies to target multiple sub-types of HIV, including modified vaccinia virus Ankara (MVA) vaccines, which were initially developed by collaborating scientists from WRAIR, NIAID, the National Institutes of Health, and the Laboratory of Viral Diseases (LVD). MHRP has ongoing studies and clinical trials using different types of MVA vaccines in Uganda and Thailand, with progress milestones including partial protection and viral load reduction in monkeys being infected with Simian Immunodeficiency Virus (SIV).

== Prevention, care, and treatment ==
In addition to vaccine research, the MHRP provides prevention, care, and treatment services to the communities where they conduct research. According to the Henry M. Jackson Foundation for the Advancement of Military Medicine's 2016 annual report, MHRP works with local programs around the world to support more than 240,000 patients on antiretroviral therapy and to make HIV testing/advising accessible to more than 1.1 million people. Using existing in-country technical expertise and administrative infrastructure, MHRP expands partnerships with local researchers, health care services and NGOs in Africa to implement PEPFAR activities. Goals include providing counseling, testing, prevention of mother to child transmission, full access to antiretroviral therapy, home-based care, and care for orphans and vulnerable children. MHRP also conducts therapeutic research, tracks the HIV epidemic in active-duty forces, assesses the risk of HIV exposure to deployed U.S. and allied forces overseas, and conducts all HIV-1 testing for the Army.

In 2008, MHRP helped evaluate the efficacy of new Rapid Diagnostic Tests (RDT) for HIV types 1 and 2. They were developed to be able to quickly test the blood of soldiers who transfuse blood to wounded soldiers in battle situations. This technology prevents transmission of HIV, HCV, and HBV from soldier to soldier and helps keep these diseases from weakening the fighting force further. Additionally, MHRP conducted the first study to characterize that current clinical testing methods can have difficulty detecting HIV viral presence in persons with acute infections.

== Work Outside of HIV ==
Zika, Ebola, and Middle East Respiratory Syndrome (MERS) outbreaks were responded to by MHRP, as they used their infrastructure and research experience to help develop vaccines for both local people and military personnel living in regions where those diseases were endemic.

In 2014, MHRP's Uganda site conducted the first vaccine trial for Ebola and Marburg virus ever done in Africa. Using combination DNA vaccines, it was shown that it is safe for people to receive both vaccines in combination. The antigens conduced by these vaccines were critical in the future development of stronger Ebola vaccines in Africa. In 2015, the Uganda site conducted a uniquely extensive study of Ebola survivors, finding that many were suffering from chronic malaise including hearing and vision loss up to 21 months post-infection.

MHRP scientists under WRAIR developed a Zika vaccine called ZIKV in only ten months, beginning clinical trial in 2016. This vaccine is not only important to maintain troop health when deploying to foreign regions where Zika is prevalent, but also for those servicemen stationed domestically because there are clusters of military bases in the southern United States where people are at risk for Zika. Preliminary data from a phase 1 clinical trial indicate that 92% of participants would be protected from Zika infection.
