= Telemedicine and Advanced Technology Research Center (United States Army) =

U.S. Army center for addressing gaps in DoD medical research

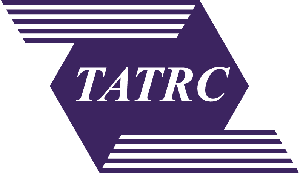
- TATRC logo
- Active: 1991–present
- Country: United States
- Branch: United States Army
- Part of: U.S. Army Medical Research and Development Command
- Garrison/HQ: Fort Detrick, Maryland
- Website: www.tatrc.org

The Telemedicine and Advanced Technology Research Center (TATRC) is a medical research unit of the U.S. Army Medical Research and Development Command (USAMRDC). Their stated mission is "to automate casualty care by fusing data, humans, and machines into trustworthy solutions that optimize medical performance and casualty outcomes." The TATRC is headquartered at Fort Detrick, in Frederick, Maryland.

== History ==
On 1 November 1991, Lieutenant Colonel Fred Goeringer was assigned as the project officer to develop, procure, and deploy a filmless medical diagnostic imaging system (MDIS). This project, the initial precursor to TATRC, was a joint effort of the US Army and US Air Force medical departments.

The project became a formal organization in 1993, called the Medical Advanced Technology Management Office (MATMO), under the leadership of Lt. Col. Goeringer.

During the mid-1990s, a broad array of advanced and newly developing technologies were used to meet military medicine requirements including biomedical science, a secure global positioning system, wireless networking, data compression and adaptable tactical mobile networks. In March 1996, COL Gary Gilbert, Ph.D., US Army Medical Service Corps, succeeded COL Goeringer as director. In 1997, Col. Jeffrey Roller, MD, US Air Force Medical Corps was assigned to serve as clinical director. He succeeded COL Gilbert, who became the MRMC deputy for IM/IT, until his retirement in June 1998.

In 1998, MATMO was reorganized and renamed the Telemedicine and Advanced Technology Research Center (TATRC). Colonel Roller continued as director until his retirement in October 2006. Subsequently, Colonel Karl Friedl, Ph.D., US Army Medical Service Corps, assumed directorship.

TATRC has been active in areas such as health informatics, medical imaging, mobile computing and remote monitoring, and simulation and training. TATRC has promoted organizations such as The American Telemedicine Association (ATA) during its early years and has promoted the use of virtual reality tools, biomaterials, and hospital-of-the-future concepts. The use of technology to support deployed forces was emphasized when LTC Ronald Poropatich, MD (with dual appointments at Walter Reed Army Medical Center and MATMO) was deployed to Somalia during Operation Restore Hope in 1993 with the purpose of utilizing telemedicine.

Between 1993 and 1996, tertiary care telemedicine was supported from the Walter Reed Telemedicine Directorate and was deployed for military medical missions in 12 countries.

In 2020, TATRC was involved in multiple projects responding to the COVID-19 pandemic.

== Locations ==
TATRC is headquartered at Fort Detrick, in Frederick, Maryland, and has two satellite offices: one at Fort Gordon, in Augusta, Georgia, and a second location in Frederick, Maryland.

== Commanders/Directors of TATRC and its precursors ==
No.	Name	Dates of tenure	Military rank	Branch	Name
1	Fred Goeringer	November 1991 – March 1996	Colonel	Army	MDIS; MATMO
2	Gary Gilbert	March 1996 – 1998	Colonel	Army	MATMO
3	Jeffrey Roller	1998 – October 2006	Colonel	Air Force	TATRC
4	Karl Friedl	October 2006 – 2012	Colonel	Army	TATRC
5	Deydre Teyhen	2012–2013	Lieutenant Colonel (Acting)	Army	TATRC
6	Daniel Kral	2013 – July 2018	Colonel	Army	TATRC
7	Gina Adam	July 2018 – June 2019	Colonel	Army	TATRC
8	Jeremy Pamplin	June 2019 – April 2025	Colonel	Army	TATRC

The leader of TATRC and its precursors was called "Director" until the term was changed to "Commander" in October 2021. Making COL Jeremy Pamplin both a former Director (June 2019 to October 2021) and Commander (October 2021 to April 2025).

== Notes ==
- This article contains information that originally came from the US Government publications and websites and is in the public domain.
