= Schoomaker =

Schoomaker is a surname. Notable people with the surname include:

- Eric Schoomaker (born 1948), American army officer
- Peter Schoomaker (born 1946), American army officer, brother of Eric
