= Walter Reed (disambiguation) =

Major Walter Reed (1851–1902) was a U.S. Army physician celebrated for work establishing that yellow fever is spread by mosquitoes.

Walter Reed may also refer to:

== People ==
- Walter Reed (actor) (1916–2001), American actor
- Walter Reed (cricketer) (1839–1880), English cricketer
- Walter Reed (Canadian politician) (1869–1945)
- Walter D. Reed (1924–2022), United States Air Force general
- Walter L. Reed (1877–1956), U.S. Army general and son of Major Walter Reed
- Killah Priest, stage name of rapper Walter Reed (born 1970)

== Military medical institutions ==
- Walter Reed General Hospital (WRGH), (1909–1951), Washington, DC, USA, a former U.S. Army general hospital
- Walter Reed Army Medical Center (WRAMC), (1951–2011), Washington, DC, once the U.S. Army's main hospital on the East Coast
  - Walter Reed Army Medical Center neglect scandal, the 2007 scandal concerning substandard care of soldiers at WRAMC
- Walter Reed Health Care System (WRHCS), a complex of U.S. Army hospitals and clinics in the Washington, DC, region
- Walter Reed Army Institute of Research (WRAIR), Silver Spring (Forest Glen), a research center and former tenant unit of the WRAMC installation
- Walter Reed National Military Medical Center (WRNMMC), a merged facility of WRAMC with the National Naval Medical Center which opened in Bethesda, MD

== Other ==
- Walter Reed Medal, a military decoration given to those who participated in the yellow fever investigation
- Walter Reed Middle School, a school in Studio City, California
- "Walter Reed", a song by Michael Penn on the album Mr. Hollywood Jr., 1947

== See also ==
- Walt Reed (1917–2005), art historian and author
- Walter Read (disambiguation)
- Walter Reade (disambiguation)
- Walter Reid (disambiguation)
