= San Antonio Market (Defense Health Agency) =

- DHA Seal
- Active: July 16, 2022
- Part of: Military Health System (MHS)
- Garrison/HQ: Joint Base San Antonio, Texas

Commanders
- Director: U.S. Air Force Maj. Gen. Thomas W. Harrell
- Deputy Director: U.S. Army Brig. Gen. Deydre Teyhen

The San Antonio Market is one of 20 large military medical markets that directly report to the Defense Health Agency (DHA). The Market comprises all military medical facilities in the San Antonio, Texas area, to include Brooke Army Medical Center, Wilford Hall Ambulatory Surgical Center, 10 standalone military treatment facilities, and over 100 specialty services—staffed by Army, Air Force, Navy, civilian and contract personnel.

The Market works to optimize personnel and resources and improve access to care for more than 250,000 military Tricare beneficiaries across the region.

The Market encompasses the Department of Defense’s largest inpatient hospital and outpatient facility, and the DoD's only Level I Trauma Center. It's also home to the Institute of Surgical Research (ISR) Burn Center, the DoD's only burn center.

== History ==
The San Antonio Military Health System (SAMHS) began operations on Sept. 15, 2011. SAMHS was responsible for providing management and oversight of business, clinical, and educational functions of all Military Health System (MHS) military treatment facilities (MTFs) located in the San Antonio metropolitan area.

Appointed as the first SAMHS director was U.S. Air Force Maj. Gen. Byron Hepburn, who also served as commander of the 59th Medical Wing. U.S. Army Maj. Gen. Ted Wong, also commander of then-Southern Regional Medical Command and Brooke Army Medical Center, became the deputy director.

Air Force Maj. Gen. Byron C. Hepburn, commander, 59th Medical Wing, relinquished the position of SAMHS director to Army Maj. Gen. Jimmie O. Keenan, commanding general, Southern Regional Medical Command, during the first SAMHS transfer of authority ceremony Sept. 12, 2013, in a ceremony at Brooke Army Medical Center. Hepburn became the SAMHS deputy director.

In 2013, then-Deputy Secretary of Defense Ashton Carter directed the establishment of the Defense Health Agency to assume shared functions, services and activities of the Army, Navy, and Air Force within the Military Health System. Medical operations had previously been managed individually by each service. As a result, the San Antonio Military Health System became an enhanced multi-service market (eMSM), Maj. Gen. Jimmie Keenan was appointed as the first market manager Oct. 1, 2013.

On July 16, 2021, San Antonio's military treatment facilities officially unified as a Market with the Defense Health Agency during a ceremony at Brooke Army Medical Center. The San Antonio Market was charged with optimizing personnel and resources and improving access to care for more than 250,000 military beneficiaries across the region. With the ceremony, U.S. Air Force Jeannine M. Ryder, commander, 59th Medical Wing, became the first Market director and U.S. Army Brig. Gen. Clinton Murray became the first deputy director, a position that's currently held by U.S. Army Brig. Gen. Deydre Teyhen, commanding general, Brooke Army Medical Center, who was appointed July 19, 2022.

The San Antonio Market was the seventh Defense Health Agency market to stand up. DHA assumed administration and management responsibilities of military hospitals and clinics from the Army, Navy and Air Force on Oct. 1, 2019. Since then, these facilities have gradually transitioned from being supported by the military medical departments to the DHA through the stand up of medical markets.

== Facilities ==
Brooke Army Medical Center

Wilford Hall Ambulatory Surgical Center

Randolph Clinic

CPT. Jennifer M. Moreno Primary Care Clinic

McWethy Troop Medical Clinic

Reid Clinic

Schertz Medical Home

Taylor Burk Health Clinic

Westover Medical Home

Center for the Intrepid

Gateway Bulverde Clinic

Corpus Christi Occupational Health Clinic
