= George W. Weightman =

United States Army general

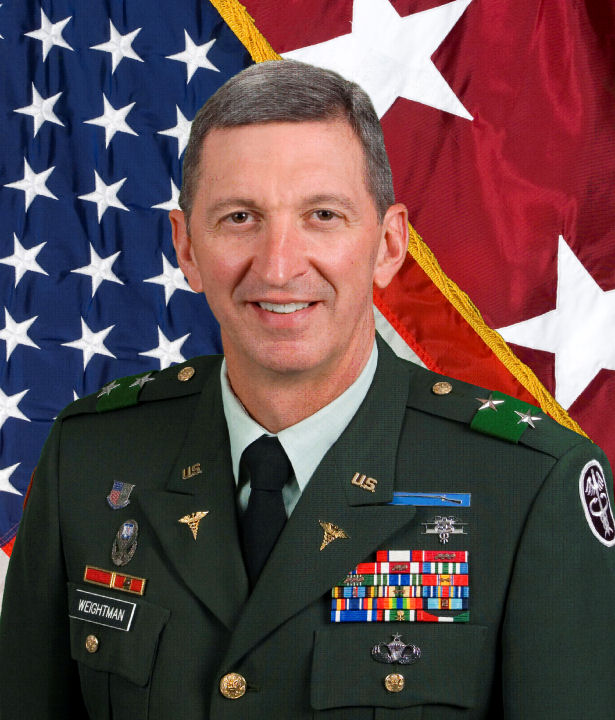
- Born: June 15, 1951 (age 75); Eden Mills, Vermont
- Military career
- Allegiance: United States of America
- Branch: United States Army
- Service years: 1973–2009 (36 years)
- Rank: Major General
- Units: 25th Infantry Division, 82nd Airborne Division
- Commands: 44th Medical Brigade; Walter Reed Army Medical Center; U.S. Army Medical Research and Materiel Command
- Conflicts: Operation Desert Storm; Operation Just Cause
- Awards: Distinguished Service Medal; Legion of Merit (4); Bronze Star (2); Meritorious Service Medal (3); Joint Service Commendation Medal; Army Commendation Medal (4),

Major General George William Weightman (born June 15, 1951) was a U.S. Army Family Medicine physician who was commander of the North Atlantic Regional Medical Command and Walter Reed Army Medical Center (WRAMC). He was relieved of his WRAMC command on March 1, 2007, in the wake of the Walter Reed Army Medical Center neglect scandal. He took command of the U.S. Army Medical Research and Materiel Command in November 2007 and retired from active duty on 31 March 2009.

Weightman is board-certified by the American Board of Family Practice and is a Fellow of the American Academy of Family Physicians.

== Early life and education ==
Weightman is a native of Eden Mills, Vermont. He received his Bachelor of Science Degree from the United States Military Academy at West Point, New York in 1973 and was commissioned as a Lieutenant of Infantry and stationed at Schofield Barracks, Hawaii, where he served in the 1st Battalion, 35th Infantry, 25th Infantry Division. He was awarded a Doctorate of Medicine degree from the University of Vermont College of Medicine in 1982 and completed his Family Practice residency training at Eisenhower Army Medical Center, Fort Gordon, Georgia.

== Career ==
Following his training, Weightman was assigned to Keller Army Community Hospital at West Point, New York, where he served as Chief of the Department of Primary Care and Community Medicine. In 1989, he became the 82nd Airborne Division Surgeon and served with the All Americans during Operations Just Cause and Desert Shield/Storm.

He served as Family Practice Residency Director at Womack Army Medical Center before commanding the Medical Element, Joint Task Force Bravo, Soto Cano, Honduras. He then commanded the McDonald Army Community Hospital, Fort Eustis, Virginia, and the 30th Medical Brigade in Heidelberg, Germany. In July 1999, he became the Chief of the Medical Corps Branch at United States Army Personnel Command, Alexandria, Virginia. From May 2002 to October 2002, MG Weightman served as Assistant Surgeon General for Force Projection and then as the Commanding General, 3rd Medical Command (Forward), and Coalition Forces Land Component Command Surgeon for Operation Iraqi Freedom. He later served as Commanding General, 44th Medical Command/Corps Surgeon, XVIII Airborne Corps at Fort Bragg, North Carolina. MG Weightman assumed command of the North Atlantic Regional Medical Command and Walter Reed Army Medical Center on August 25, 2006. He served as the Commander of the U.S. Army Medical Department Center and School and Fort Sam Houston, San Antonio, Texas, from August 2004 until July 2006. He commanded the Walter Reed Army Medical Center in Washington, D.C., from 25 August 2006 until 1 March 2007, when he was relieved of command in the wake of the Walter Reed neglect scandal over conditions at the medical center. He took command of the U.S. Army Medical Research and Materiel Command in November 2007.

Weightman is married to the former Joan Peters from Youngstown, Ohio. They have three children.

== Decorations and Badges ==
The Expert Infantryman Badge, Expert Field Medical Badge, Senior Parachutist Badge with combat star, Honduran Parachutist Badge. He is also a member of the Order of Military Medical Merit.

== See also ==
- Walter Reed Army Medical Center

| Preceded by Maj. Gen. Kenneth L. Farmer Jr. | Commanding General of Walter Reed Army Medical Center; 25 August 2006–1 March 2007 | Succeeded by Lt. Gen. Kevin C. Kiley |
