= Kenneth L. Farmer Jr. =

United States Army general (born 1950)

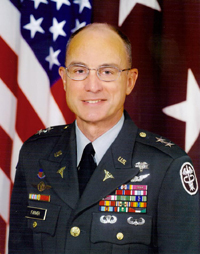
- Born: Kenneth Lloyd Farmer Jr. 13 April 1950 (age 76); Leeds, Alabama
- Military career
- Allegiance: United States
- Branch: United States Army
- Rank: Major General
- Commands: North Atlantic Regional Medical Command; Walter Reed Army Medical Center; 44th Medical Command; 22nd Support Command Medical Group (Provisional); 85th Evacuation Hospital

Major General Kenneth Lloyd Farmer Jr. (born April 13, 1950) commanded Walter Reed Army Medical Center and North Atlantic Regional Medical Command from June 2004 to August 2006.

== Biography ==
A family practice physician, he earned a Bachelor of Science degree from Auburn University, and a medical degree from the University of Alabama at Birmingham in Birmingham, Alabama. He received his medical specialty training at Eisenhower Army Medical Center, Fort Gordon, Georgia, and at Madigan Army Medical Center, Fort Lewis, Washington. He is also a graduate of the Army's Command and General Staff College and the Army War College.

Farmer commanded the North Atlantic Regional Medical Command and Walter Reed Army Medical Center from June 2004 to August 25, 2006. Prior to this, Farmer served as the Deputy Surgeon General for the U.S. Army and as the chief of staff for U.S. Army Medical Command.

Farmer grew up in Leeds, Alabama. His father, Kenneth L. Farmer Sr., was a prisoner of war during World War II and survivor of the Bataan Death March. Farmer and his wife have four adult sons.

=== Awards ===
His military awards and decorations include Distinguished Service Medal, Defense Superior Service Medal (two awards), the Legion of Merit (four awards), the Bronze Star, the Defense Meritorious Service Medal, the Meritorious Service Medal (four awards), the Army Commendation Medal, the Army Achievement Medal (two awards), and various service and unit awards. He holds the Expert Field Medical Badge, the Parachutist Badge, the Air Assault Badge, and is an Army flight surgeon. He has also been awarded the Order of Military Medical Merit.

== Walter Reed Army Medical Center Controversy ==
In February 2007, The Washington Post ran a series of articles about the shoddy conditions maintained at Walter Reed Army Medical Center. These revelations led to the firing of then-commander of Walter Reed, Maj. Gen. George W. Weightman, as well as Weightman's successor, Lt. Gen. Kevin C. Kiley. Kiley, who preceded Farmer as commander of Walter Reed, served as acting commander for a single day after Weightman was relieved of duty. The problems at Walter Reed would have occurred during the tenures of Kiley, Farmer and Weightman.

== See also ==
- Surgeon General of the United States Army
- Walter Reed Army Medical Center

Preceded by Lt. Gen. Kevin C. Kiley	Commanding General of Walter Reed Army Medical Center; June 2004–August 25, 2006	Succeeded by Maj. Gen. George W. Weightman
