= Walter Reid =

Walter Reid may refer to:

- Walter Reid (footballer) (born 1869), Scottish footballer at Grimsby Town
- Walter Scott Reid, New Zealand's first Solicitor General, 1875–1900
- Walter Reid (abbot), the last Cistercian Abbot of Kinloss, Scotland (1553–1587)

== See also ==
- Walter Read (disambiguation)
- Walter Reade (disambiguation)
- Walter Reed (disambiguation)
