= Gale Pollock =

US Army Deputy Surgeon General (2006–2007)

Gale S. Pollock
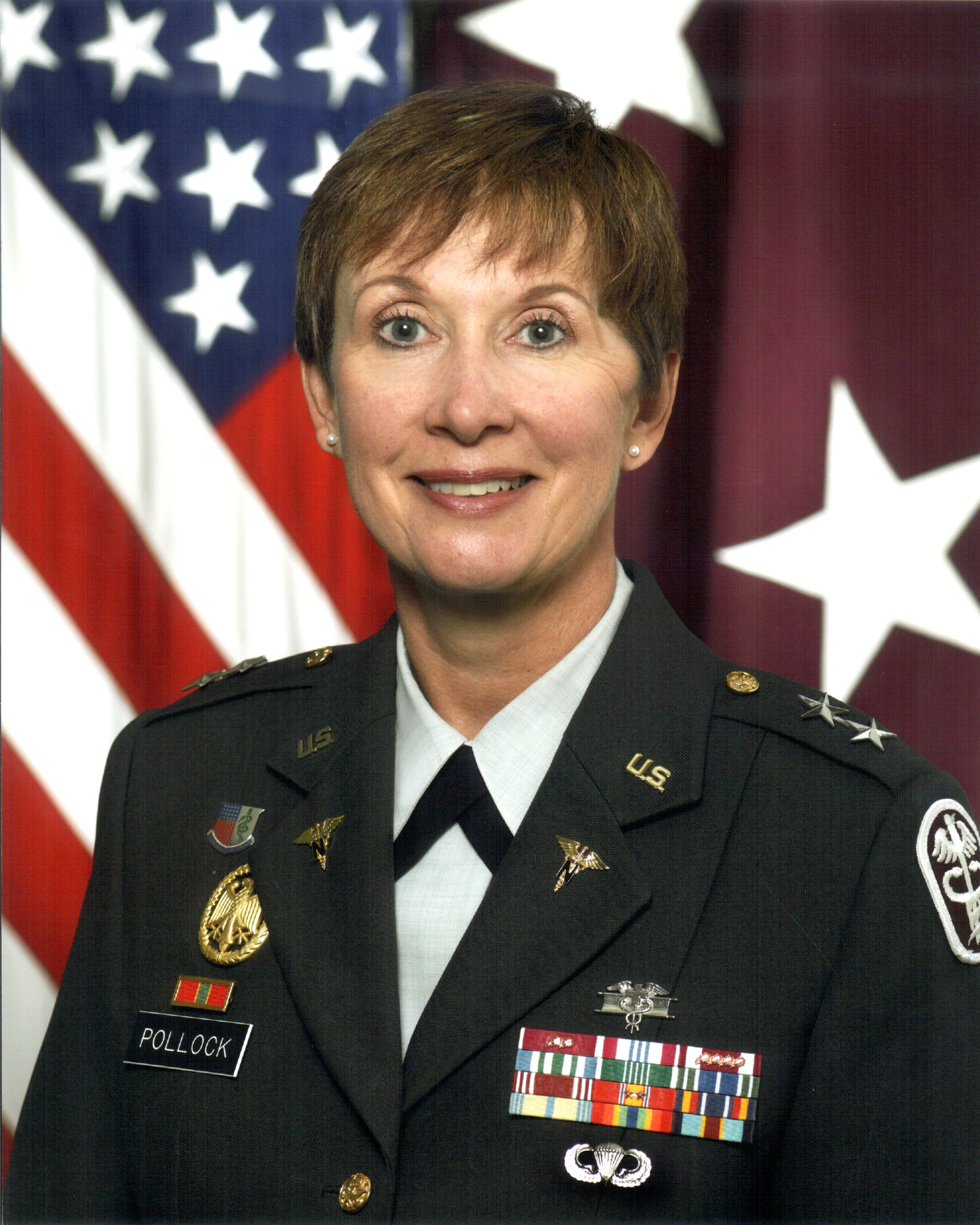
- Maj. Gen. Gale Pollock, RN, CRNA, BSN
- Born: Kearny, New Jersey, U.S.
- Military career
- Allegiance: United States
- Branch: United States Army
- Rank: Major General
- Commands: United States Army Medical Command; Army Nurse Corps; Tripler Army Medical Center; Martin Army Community Hospital; United States Army Medical Activity, Fort Drum
- Awards: Army Distinguished Service Medal; Legion of Merit (3)

Gale S. Pollock is a retired United States Army major general who served as the Deputy Surgeon General of the United States Army from October 2006 to March 2007, and also as chief of the Army Nurse Corps. She became acting Surgeon General of the United States Army for nine months following the 20 March 2007 retirement of her predecessor, Kevin C. Kiley, due to fallout from the Walter Reed Army Medical Center neglect scandal. She was the first woman and the first non-physician to hold the position.

Pollock served in the army for more than 30 years until her retirement in 2008. She is a Certified Registered Nurse Anesthetist. She was a Fellow at Harvard's Advanced Leadership Initiative in 2011.

== Education ==
Pollock received a Bachelor of Science degree in Nursing from the University of Maryland, Baltimore. She attended the U.S. Army Nurse Anesthesia Program and is a Certified Registered Nurse Anesthetist (CRNA). She received her Master of Business Administration from Boston University, a Master of Healthcare Administration from Baylor University, a Master of Science in National Security Strategy from the National Defense University, and an honorary Doctorate of Public Service from the University of Maryland. She is also a Fellow at the American College of Healthcare Executives (FACHE).

Pollock's military education includes the Department of Defense CAPSTONE Program; the Senior Service College at the Industrial College of the Armed Forces; the Air War College; the Interagency Institute for Federal Health Care Executives; the Military Health System CAPSTONE program; the Principles of Advanced Nurse Administrators; and the NATO Staff Officer Course.

== Military career ==
Pollock's last position was Chief, United States Army Nurse Corps and Commanding General of Tripler Army Medical Center of the Pacific Regional Medical Command. She was also Lead Agent of TRICARE Pacific in Honolulu, Hawaii.

Her past military assignments include Special Assistant to the Surgeon General for Information Management and Health Policy; Commander, Martin Army Community Hospital, Fort Benning, Ga.; Commander, U.S. Army Medical Activity, Fort Drum, N.Y.; Staff Officer, Strategic Initiatives Command Group for the Army Surgeon General; Department of Defense Healthcare Advisor to the Congressional Commission on Service Members and Veterans Transition Assistance; Health Fitness Advisor at the National Defense University; Senior Policy Analyst in Health Affairs, DoD; and Chief, Anesthesia Nursing Service at Walter Reed Army Medical Center, Washington, D.C.

== Awards ==
Pollock's awards and decorations include the Army Distinguished Service Medal, Legion of Merit (with 2 oak leaf clusters), the Defense Meritorious Service Medal, the Meritorious Service Medal (with 4 oak leaf clusters), the Joint Service Commendation Medal, the Army Commendation Medal, and the Army Achievement Medal. She also earned the Expert Field Medical Badge, and the Parachutist Badge. She received the Army Staff Identification Badge for her work at the Pentagon and earned the German Armed Forces Badge for Military Proficiency (Leistungsabzeichen) in gold.

== Criticism ==
In 2007, an ABC News piece and a story by The Nation journalist Joshua Kors questioned Pollock's involvement in a brewing scandal involving personality disorder discharges from the military. Pollock released a memo claiming that her office had conducted a careful review of a series of personality disorder discharges from Fort Carson, Colorado, a review Kors alleged to be a sham. According to Kors' piece, the Office of the Army Surgeon General had not interacted directly with discharged soldiers, instead relying on the Army officials who made the original diagnoses to confirm their confidence in their diagnoses. Kors article stated that the Surgeon General's office then closed the review, without seeking information from more objective sources, leading to criticism of Pollock by the Iraq War Veterans Organization and Veterans for America

== Personal ==
In the 2024 United States presidential election, Pollock endorsed Kamala Harris.

== Citations ==
Military offices
Preceded by Kevin C. Kiley	Surgeon General of the United States Army (Acting); March 12, 2007 – December 11, 2007	Succeeded by Eric Schoomaker
