= Kevin C. Kiley =

Surgeon General of the US Army

Kevin Christopher Kiley
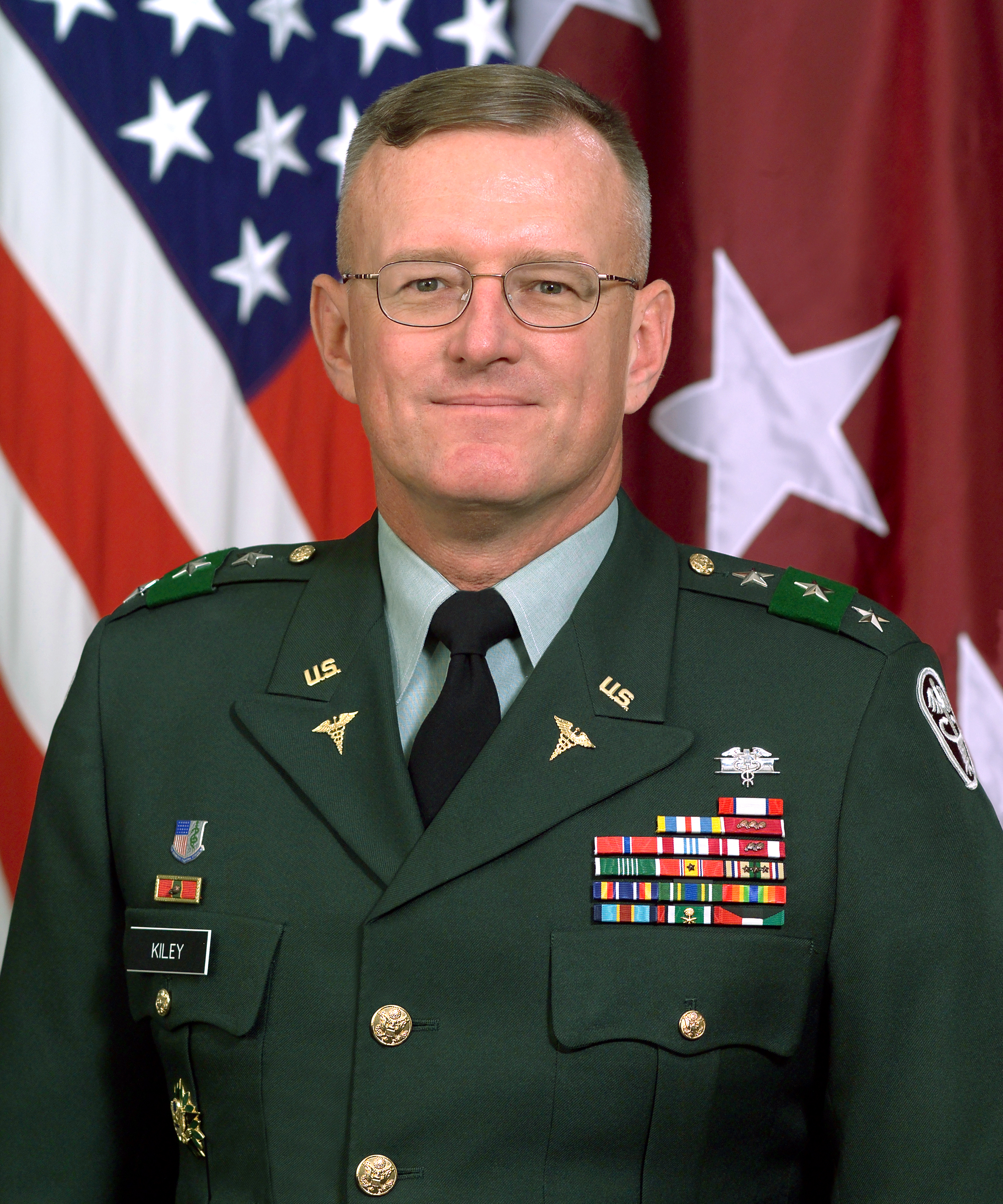
- Kiley in 2004 (pictured with the three stars of a Lt. Gen.)
- Born: October 18, 1950 (age 76)
- Military career
- Allegiance: United States of America
- Branch: United States Army
- Service years: 1976–2007
- Rank: Lieutenant General (Retired as Major General)
- Commands: Surgeon General of the United States Army
- Conflicts: Operation Desert Storm
- Awards: Distinguished Service Medal; Defense Superior Service Medal; Legion of Merit (4); Bronze Star; Expert Field Medical Badge

Kevin Christopher Kiley (born October 18, 1950) is a former lieutenant general in the United States Army who served as the 41st Surgeon General of the United States Army and the commander of the U.S. Army Medical Command, Fort Sam Houston, Texas. He was commander of Walter Reed Army Medical Center and North Atlantic Regional Medical Command twice, from 2002 to 2004, and as acting commander, March 1–2, 2007. He submitted his request to retire from the U.S. Army on March 11, 2007, in the wake of the Walter Reed Army Medical Center neglect scandal, and was removed from his nominative billet as a lieutenant general. Pending retirement, he was assigned to a temporary billet at the General Officer Management Office at the Pentagon in the grade major general. His retirement in the grade of major general was subsequently approved.

== Biography ==
=== Education ===
Kiley was born in Pennsylvania on October 18, 1950, and graduated from the University of Scranton in 1972 with a bachelor's degree in biology. He received his medical degree in 1976 from Georgetown University School of Medicine, Washington, D.C. He served a surgical internship at Brooke Army Medical Center in San Antonio, Texas, and then an obstetrics and gynecology residency at William Beaumont Army Medical Center, El Paso, Texas. He is also a graduate of the U.S. Army War College, Carlisle Barracks, Pennsylvania.

He is a board-certified OB/GYN and a fellow of the American College of Obstetricians and Gynecologists.

=== Work ===
His first tour was with the 121st Evacuation Hospital in Seoul, South Korea, where he was the chief of OB/GYN services. He returned to the residency training program at William Beaumont Army Medical Center and served as chief of the Family Planning and Counseling Service. He then served as assistant chief of the department of OB/GYN.

He was assigned as the Division Surgeon of the 10th Mountain Division at Fort Drum, New York. He then assumed command of the newly activated 10th Medical Battalion, 10th Mountain Division, serving concurrently in both assignments. He returned to William Beaumont Army Medical Center, where he first served as the assistant chief, then chair of the department of OB/GYN.

In November 1990, he assumed command of the 15th Evacuation Hospital at Fort Polk, Louisiana, and in January 1991, he deployed the hospital to Saudi Arabia in support of Operations Desert Shield and Desert Storm. Upon his return, he was assigned as the Deputy Commander for Clinical Services at Womack Army Medical Center, Fort Bragg, North Carolina.

He assumed command of the Landstuhl Regional Medical Center and what is now the U.S. Army Europe Regional Medical Command in Landstuhl, Germany, serving concurrently as the Command Surgeon, U.S. Army Europe and 7th Army.

Kiley then assumed the duties of Assistant Surgeon General for Force Projection; Deputy Chief of Staff for Operations, Health Policy and Services, U.S. Army Medical Command; and Chief, Medical Corps. His next tour was as Commander of the U.S. Army Medical Department Center and School at Fort Sam Houston, where he continued as Chief of the Medical Corps.

Kiley served as commander of Walter Reed Army Medical Center and North Atlantic Regional Medical Command twice, from 2002 to June 2004, when Maj. Gen. Kenneth L. Farmer Jr. took command; and for a single day as acting commander, March 1–2, 2007 (See "Walter Reed Army Medical Center Controversy," below).

In a public statement following his retirement submission on March 11, 2007, Kiley said: "I submitted my retirement because I think it is in the best interest of the Army. I want to allow Acting Secretary Geren, General Schoomaker, and the leaders of the Army Medical Command to focus completely on the way ahead and the Army Action Plan to improve all aspects of Soldier care. We are an Army Medical Department at war, supporting an Army at war – it shouldn't be and it isn't about one doctor." Maj. Gen. Gale S. Pollock assumed the post of Acting Army Surgeon General.

Since his approved military retirement, Doctor Kiley has remained a Fellow of the American College of Obstetrics and Gynecology, and secured a position with the Albany Medical Center in New York as chair of the department of OB/GYN where he continues to see patients.

=== Awards ===
Among his awards and decorations are the Distinguished Service Medal, Defense Superior Service Medal, Legion of Merit (three oak leaf clusters), Bronze Star, Defense Meritorious Service Medal, Meritorious Service Medal (two oak leaf clusters), Army Commendation Medal, the "A" professional designator, the Order of Military Medical Merit and the Expert Field Medical Badge.

- Army Distinguished Service Medal
- Defense Superior Service Medal
- Legion of Merit with three oak leaf clusters
- Bronze Star
- Defense Meritorious Service Medal
- Meritorious Service Medal with two oak leaf clusters
- Army Commendation Medal

== Walter Reed scandal ==
In February 2007, The Washington Post and Army Times ran a series of articles about the shoddy conditions maintained at Walter Reed Army Medical Center. Then-Army Sec. Francis J. Harvey had appointed Kiley to return to Walter Reed as acting commander, replacing his original successor at the post, Maj. Gen. George W. Weightman, who had been fired by Harvey that day.

On the same day, the Post reported that Kiley had been aware of the issues at Walter Reed from his command in 2003. Further reports surfaced that during a visit in 2004 to Walter Reed by Congressman Bill Young and his wife Beverly Young, a soldier was witnessed sleeping in his own urine. Beverly Young, after being ignored by a nurse over the issue, went to Kiley's office to complain. She was quoted on the incident stating:

I went flying down to Kevin Kiley's office again, and got nowhere. He has skirted this stuff for five years and blamed everyone else.

— Beverly Young, wife of representative Bill Young

Kiley called the Post's reporting "a one-sided representation" and "yellow journalism at its worst." In his testimony before the House Oversight and Government Reform Committee in March 2007, Kiley blamed junior officers for the conditions at Walter Reed.

== See also ==
Preceded by Maj. Gen. Harold L. Timboe; Maj. Gen. George W. Weightman	Commanding General of Walter Reed Army Medical Center; 2002 – June 2004; 1 March 2007–2 March 2007	Succeeded by Maj. Gen. Kenneth L. Farmer Jr. Maj. Gen. Eric B. Schoomaker
Preceded by Lt. Gen. James B. Peake	Surgeon General of the United States Army; September 30, 2004 – March 12, 2007	Succeeded by Maj. Gen. Gale Pollock (acting)
