= Robert Vigersky =

American endocrinologist

Robert A. Vigersky is an American endocrinologist, Professor of Medicine at the Uniformed Services University of the Health Sciences, and pioneering military healthcare professional. His career has focused on diabetes care, research, and advocacy, publishing 148 papers and 118 abstracts in the fields of reproductive endocrinology and diabetes. Vigersky is a retired colonel in the U.S. Army Medical Corps, past president of the Endocrine Society, and recipient of the General Maxwell R. Thurman Award. He served in Iraq, Korea and Germany and is the recipient of military awards including the U.S. Army's Legion of Merit in 2009.

== Professional experience and research ==
Vigersky is a graduate of the 6-year Program in Liberal Arts and Medicine of Boston University, the Internal Medicine Residency at The Johns Hopkins Hospital, and the Endocrine Fellowship at National Institutes of Health. Upon completing his fellowship, Dr. Vigersky joined Walter Reed Army Medical Center, where he became Assistant Chief of Endocrinology until he left the military in 1984. After leaving the military, Dr. Vigersky entered the private practice, where he became the President of the Endocrine and Diabetes Group of Washington, and served as medical director of the Diabetes Treatment Center at Georgetown University Hospital and the Washington Hospital Center.

In 2000, Dr. Vigersky re-entered the Army, establishing the Diabetes Institute at the Walter Reed Health Care System, where he was the medical director and where his research focused on the use of technology and decision-support systems to improve outcomes for patients with diabetes. He is the current Chief Medical Officer of Medtronic Diabetes.

== Selected publications ==
- Vigersky RA, McMahon C. The Relationship of Hemoglobin A1C to Time-in-Range in Patients with Diabetes.Diabetes Technol Ther. 2019 Feb;21(2):81-85.
- Vigersky RA, Shin J, Jiang B, Siegmund T, McMahon C, Thomas A. The Comprehensive Glucose Pentagon: A Glucose-Centric Composite Metric for Assessing Glycemic Control in Persons with Diabetes, J. Diab Sci. Tech., 2018 Jan;12(1):114-123.
- Vigersky R, Shrivastav M. Role of continuous glucose monitoring for type 2 in diabetes management and research. J. Diabetes Complicat.2017 Jan;31(1):280-287.
- Powers AC, Wexler JA, Lash RW, Dyer MC, Becker MN, Vigersky RA. . Affordable Care Act Implementation: Challenges and Opportunities to Impact Patients With Diabetes. J. Clin. Endocrinol. Metab. 2016-04-01
- Puckrein GA, Nunlee-Bland G, Zangeneh F, Davidson JA, Vigersky RA, Xu L, Parkin CG, Marrero DG; Diabetes Care. 2016-04-01. Impact of CMS Competitive Bidding Program on Medicare Beneficiary Safety and Access to Diabetes Testing Supplies: A Retrospective, Longitudinal Analysis.
- Fonda, S. J., Graham, C., Munakata, J., Powers, J. M., Price, D., Vigersky, R. A.; J Diabetes Sci Technol. 2016 Feb 05. The Cost-Effectiveness of Real-Time Continuous Glucose Monitoring (RT-CGM) in Type 2 Diabetes.
- Development of the Diabetes Technology Society Blood Glucose Monitor System Surveillance Protocol. Klonoff, D. C., Lias, C., Beck, S., Parkes, J. L., Kovatchev, B., Vigersky, R. A., Arreaza-Rubin, G., Burk, R. D., Kowalski, A., Little, R., Nichols, J., Petersen, M., Rawlings, K...; J Diabetes Sci Technol. 2015 Oct 21.
- Effects of α-Blocker Therapy on Active Duty Military and Military Retirees for Benign Prostatic Hypertrophy on Diabetic Complications. Graybill, S. D., Vigersky, R. A.; Mil Med. 2015 Mar 04.
- The benefits, limitations, and cost-effectiveness of advanced technologies in the management of patients with diabetes mellitus. Vigersky RA; J Diabetes Sci Technol. 2015-03-01.
- Vigersky RA; J Diabetes Sci Technol. 2015-02-19. Escaping the Hemoglobin A1c-Centric World in Evaluating Diabetes Mellitus Interventions.
- Klonoff, D. C., Vigersky, R. A., Nichols, J. H., Rice, M. J.; Mayo Clin. Proc.. 2014 Sep 10. Timely Hospital Glucose Measurement: Here Today, Gone Tomorrow?
- Vigersky RA, Fish L, Hogan P, Stewart A, Kutler S, Ladenson PW, McDermott M, Hupart KH; J. Clin. Endocrinol. Metab.. 2014-09-01. The clinical endocrinology workforce: current status and future projections of supply and demand.
- Klonoff, D. C., Lias, C., Vigersky, R., Clarke, W., Parkes, J. L., Sacks, D. B., Kirkman, M. S., Kovatchev, B.; J Diabetes Sci Technol. 2015 Jan 07. The surveillance error grid.
- Salkind, S. J., Huizenga, R., Fonda, S. J., Walker, M. S., Vigersky, R. A.; J Diabetes Sci Technol. 2014 May 31. Glycemic Variability in Nondiabetic Morbidly Obese Persons: Results of an Observational Study and Review of the Literature.
- Vigersky, R. A.; J. Clin. Endocrinol. Metab.. 2014 May 16. Mad about "u".
- Vigersky RA, Fitzner K, Levinson J for the Diabetes Working Group. . Barriers to Providing Optimal Guideline-Driven Care to Patients with Diabetes Mellitus in the United States. 2013;Diabetes Care 36:3843-3849
- Vigersky RA, Fonda SJ, Chellappa M, Walker MS, Ehrhardt N. 2012 Diabetes Care 353: 32–38, 2012. Short and Long-Term Effects of Real-Time Continuous Glucose Monitoring in Patients with Type 2 Diabetes Mellitus.
- Vigersky, RA, Loriaux DL., Howards SS, Hodgen GB, Lipsett MB, Chrambach AC. 1975 J Clin Invest 58: 1061–1068. Androgen Binding Proteins of Testis, Epididymis and Plasma in Man and Monkey.
- Vigersky RA, Andersen AE, Thompson RH, Loriaux DL. 1977 N Engl J Med 297:1141-1145. Hypothalamic Dysfunction in Secondary Amenorrhea Associated with Simple Weight Loss
