= Walter Reade (disambiguation) =

Walter Reade (1884–1952) was an American film distributor and producer.

Walter Reade may also refer to:

- Walter Reade Theater, a film society in New York City

== See also ==
- Walter Read (disambiguation)
- Walter Reed (disambiguation)
- Walter Reid (disambiguation)
