= Walter Read (disambiguation) =

Walter Read was an English cricketer.

Walter Read may also refer to:

- Walter Newton Read (1918–2001), Chairman of the New Jersey Casino Control Commission

== See also ==
- Walter Reed (disambiguation)
- Walter Reade (disambiguation)
- Walter Reid (disambiguation)
