= Patricia Horoho =

Surgeon General of the US Army

Patricia D. Horoho
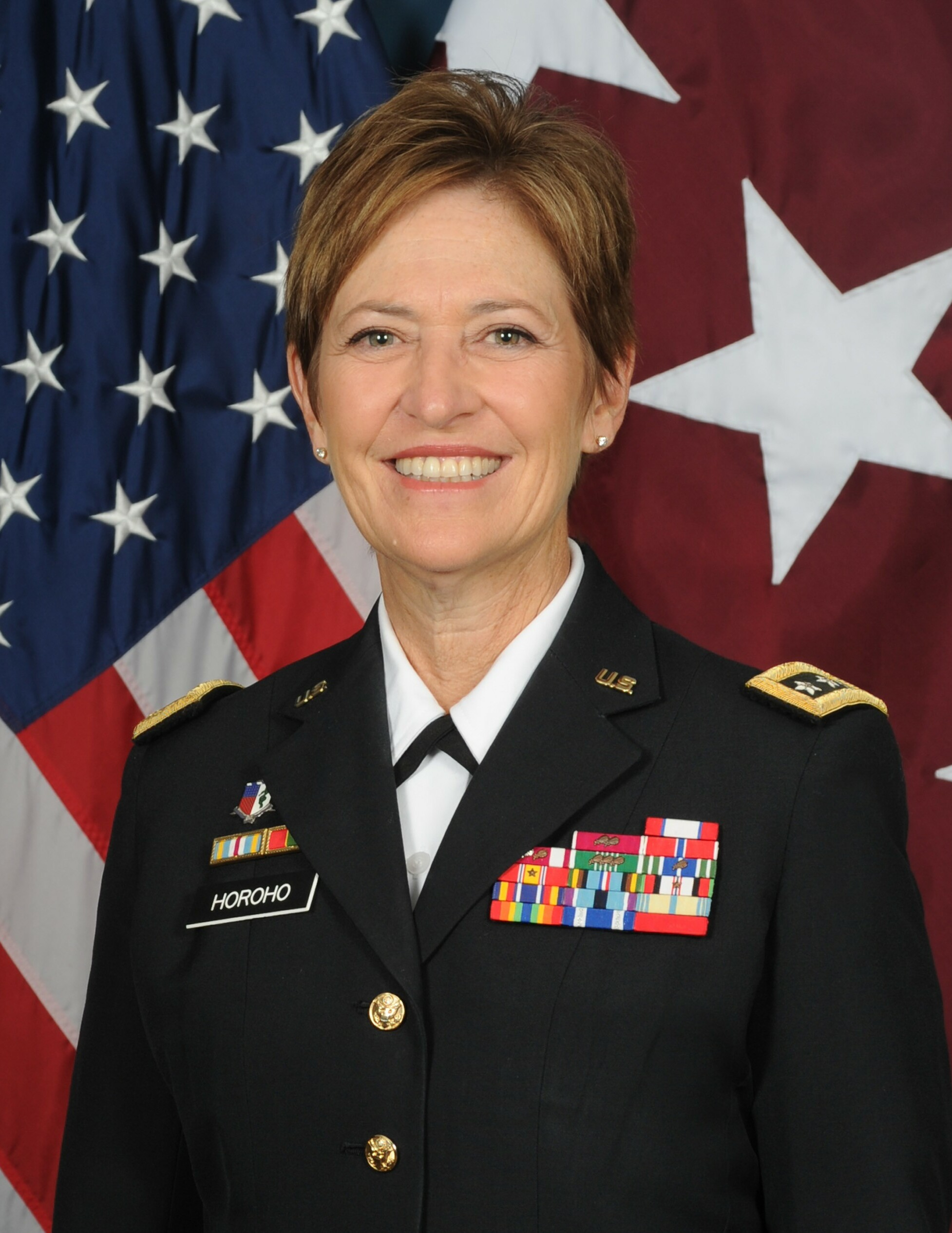
- Born: March 21, 1960 (age 66); Fort Bragg, North Carolina, U.S.
- Alma mater: University of North Carolina at Chapel Hill (BSN); University of Pittsburgh (MSN); Industrial College of the Armed Forces (MS)
- Military career
- Allegiance: United States
- Branch: United States Army
- Service years: 1982–2016
- Rank: Lieutenant General
- Commands: Surgeon General of the United States Army; United States Army Medical Command; Western Regional Medical Command; Madigan Army Medical Center; Walter Reed Health Care System; DeWitt Health Care Network
- Conflicts: War in Afghanistan
- Awards: Army Distinguished Service Medal (2); Legion of Merit (3); Bronze Star Medal

Patricia D. Horoho (née Dallas; born March 21, 1960) is a retired United States Army lieutenant general who served as the 43rd Surgeon General of the United States Army and Commanding General of the United States Army Medical Command. She was the second female Nurse Corps officer to hold the title of Army surgeon general but the first to be appointed and hold the position for a full term. In 2016, she was inducted into the United States Army Women's Foundation Hall of Fame.

== Early life and education ==
Horoho was born in Fort Bragg on March 21, 1960, and attended St. Ann Catholic School and St. Patrick Catholic School in Fayetteville, North Carolina. She graduated from E.E. Smith High School in 1978. She earned her Bachelor of Science in Nursing from the University of North Carolina at Chapel Hill in 1982 and a Master of Science in Nursing as a Clinical Trauma Nurse Specialist from the University of Pittsburgh in 1992. She later went on to earn a Master of Science degree in National Resource Strategy from the Industrial College of the Armed Forces.

== Military career ==
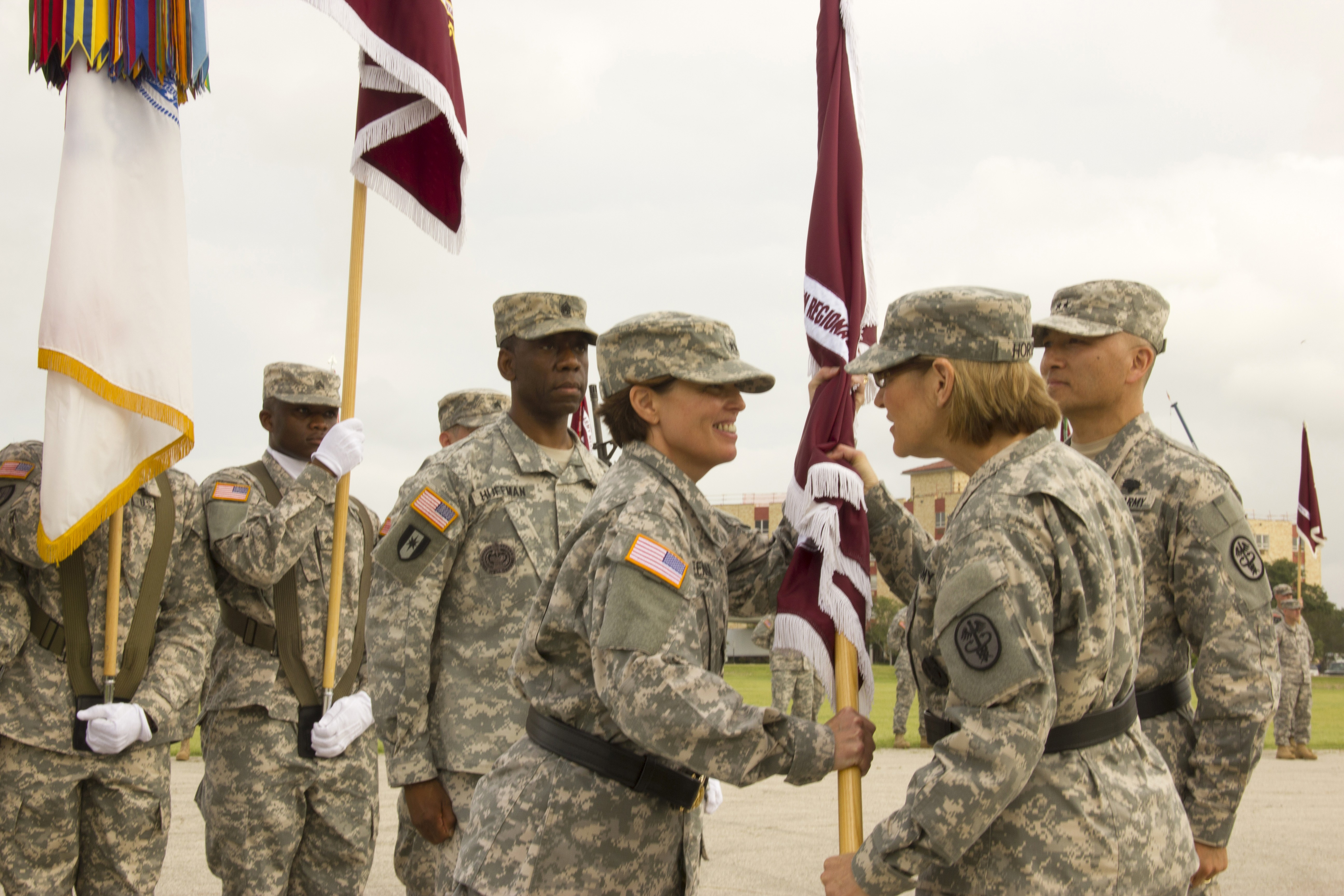
Lieutenant General Patricia D. Horoho passes the Southern Regional Medical Command guidon to Major General Jimmie O. Keenan (left) during a change of command ceremony on June 6, 2013.

In 1994, Horoho was the head nurse of the emergency room at Womack Army Medical Center. She treated the wounded in the aftermath of the Green Ramp disaster.

Horoho was recognized as a Nurse Hero by the American Red Cross on September 14, 2002, for her actions during the September 11 attacks, during which she raced "from her desk" to give first-aid to 75 victims. Among her military awards are the Army Distinguished Service Medal, the Order of Military Medical Merit medallion, Legion of Merit with two oak leaf clusters, Meritorious Service Medal with 6 oak leaf clusters, Army Commendation Medal with three oak leaf clusters, and the Army Achievement Medal with one oak leaf cluster. She was also recognized as a Legacy Laureate by the University of Pittsburgh in 2007.

Horoho has served as commander of:

- DeWitt Army Community Hospital in Fort Belvoir, Virginia (2004–2006),
- Walter Reed Health Care System in Washington D.C. (2007–2008),
- Madigan Army Medical Center in Tacoma, Washington (2008–2009),
- Western Regional Medical Command, based in Fort Lewis, Washington (2008–2010), and
- United States Army Medical Command, as Surgeon General of the United States Army (December 2011 – December 3, 2015).

Horoho was succeeded by Lieutenant General Nadja West on 11 December 2015. Horoho retired from the Army on 1 February 2016.

== Awards and recognitions ==
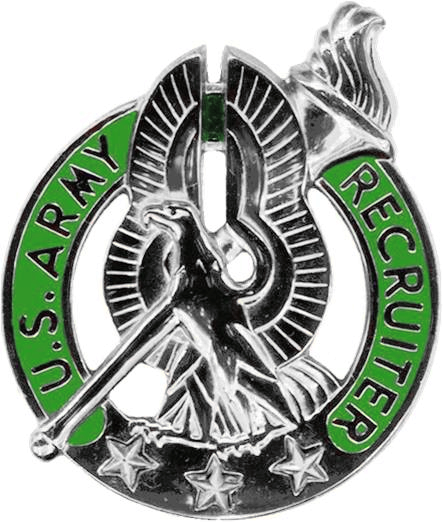
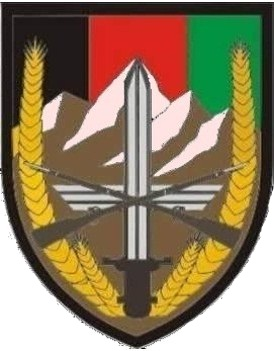
| Army Staff Identification Badge |
| Basic Army Recruiter Badge |
| United States Forces Afghanistan (USFOR-A) Combat Service Identification Badge |
| Army Medical Department (AMEDD) Distinctive Unit Insignia |

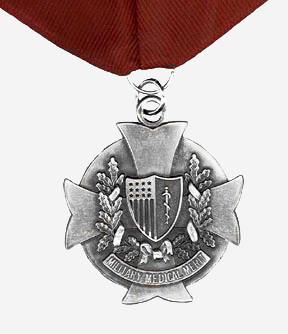
| Army Distinguished Service Medal with oak leaf cluster |
| Legion of Merit with two oak leaf clusters |
| Bronze Star Medal |
| Meritorious Service Medal with one silver and one bronze oak leaf cluster |
| Army Commendation Medal with three oak leaf clusters |
| Army Achievement Medal with one oak leaf cluster |
| Joint Meritorious Unit Award |
| Superior Unit Award with one oak leaf cluster |
| National Defense Service Medal with one service star |
| Armed Forces Expeditionary Medal |
| Afghanistan Campaign Medal with one service star |
| Global War on Terrorism Service Medal |
| Humanitarian Service Medal |
| Armed Forces Reserve Medal |
| Army Service Ribbon |
| NATO Medal for service with ISAF |
| Legion of Honor (France), Knight |
| Order of Military Medical Merit |

== Personal life ==
Horoho is the daughter of retired army officer Frank Dallas and Josephine Dallas. She is married to retired Colonel Ray Horoho, and they have two children. She has one brother, Ed Dallas, and one sister, Nancy Dallas (now Boatner). She has received honorary degrees from New York Institute of Technology and the University of Minnesota.

Military offices
| Preceded by Eric Schoomaker | Surgeon General of the United States Army; 2011–2015 | Succeeded by Nadja West |
