= General Maxwell R. Thurman Award =

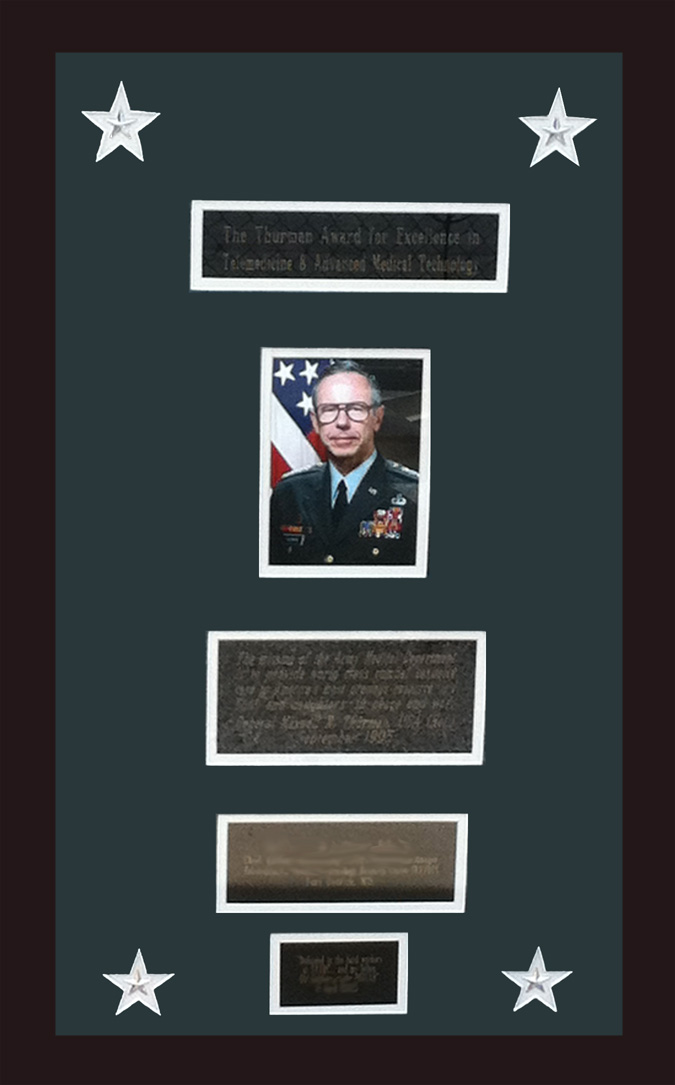
Maxwell R. Thurman Award

The General Maxwell R. Thurman Award is awarded on behalf of the commanding general of the United States Army Medical Research and Materiel Command at the American Telemedicine Association (ATA) annual conference in recognition of someone who exhibits and demonstrates the following qualities and attributes: a natural born leader, an innovator, someone who fosters positive change, a champion of the soldier, and a pioneer of the advancement of technology to enhance the life of our service members. The award is named after four star General Maxwell R. Thurman, who was a champion of the soldier and a pioneer of advancing technology. His famous motto, which is engraved on the award is as follows: "The mission of the Army Medical Department is to provide world class combat casualty care to America's most precious resource - It's Sons and Daughters - In Peace and War!" This award was originally given out at the very first DoD "Global Forum" by its creator, BG Russ Zajtchuk in 1995 and is now an annual tradition at every ATA meeting.

== List of recipients ==
Year	Name
1996	COL Fred Goeringer
1997	Capt Paul Zimnik, D.O.
1998	Russ Zajtchuk, M.D. (BG, USA-retired)
1999	COL Ronald K. Poropatich, M.D. and COL James Stewart
2000	Greg T. Mogel, M.D.
2001	Mr. Conrad A. Clyburn
2002	G. Rufus Sessions, Ph.D. (LTC, USA-retired)
2003	John S. Parker, M.D. (MG, USA-retired)
2004	S. Ward Casscells, M.D.
2005	Gary R. Gilbert, Ph.D.
2006	Carl E. Hendricks
2007	Seong Ki Mun, Ph.D.
2008	James H. "Red" Duke, M.D.
2009	John A. Parrish, M.D.
2010	COL Hon S. Pak, M.D.
2011	Michael D. Lynch, Ph.D.
2012	COL Robert A. Vigersky, M.D.
2013	Lori DeBernardis
2014	COL C. Becket Mahnke
