= Norvell Coots =

American physician, hospital administrator and retired military officer

Norvell V. Coots
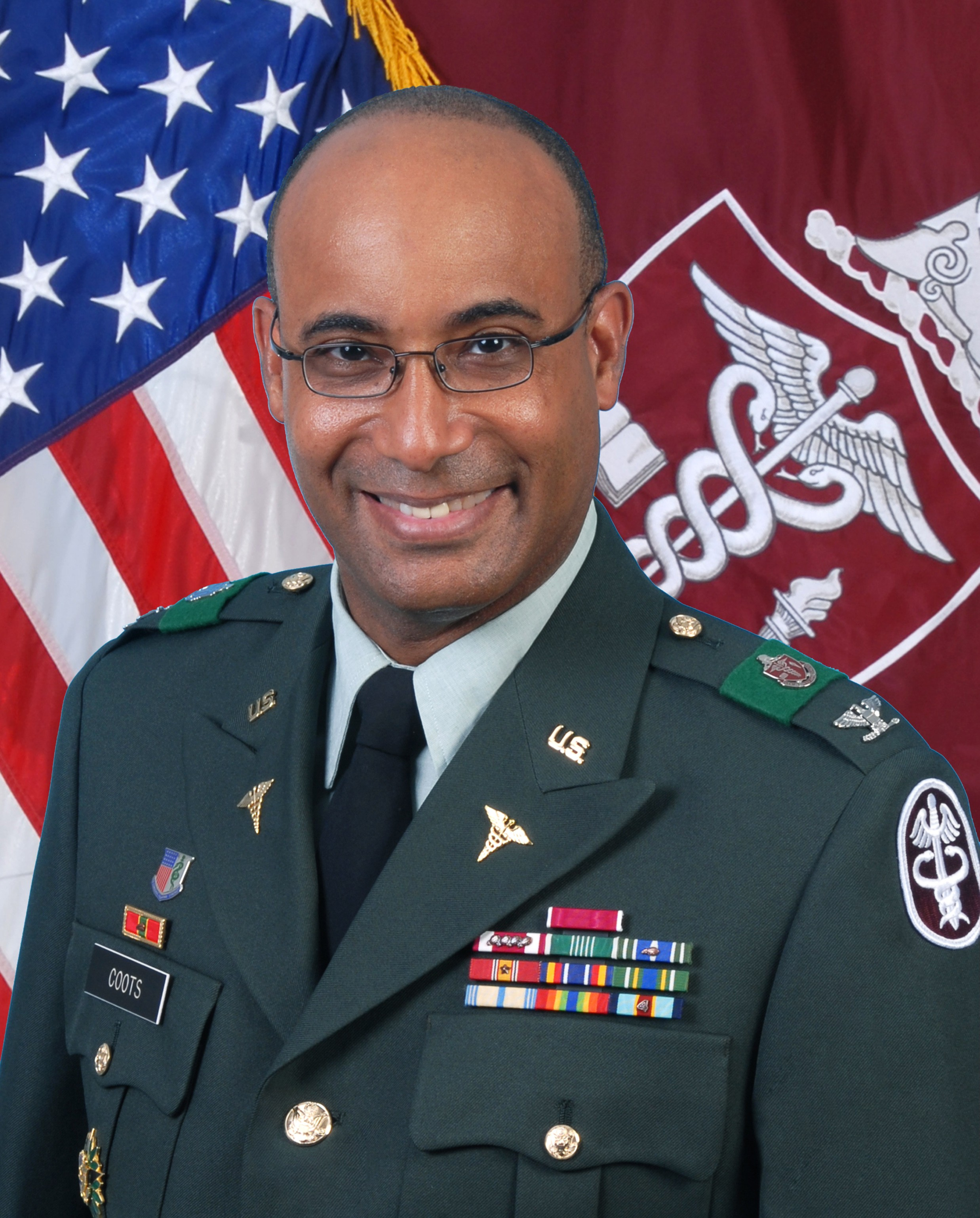
- Norvell V. Coots in 2010
- Died: June 12, 2024
- Citizenship: American
- Employer: Holy Cross Health
- Known for: physician, hospital administrator and retired military officer
- Parents: W. Norvell Coots (father); Theresa Coots Edgecombe (mother)
- Website: www.norvellcoots.com

Norvell V. Coots (died 2024) was an American physician, hospital administrator and military officer. From August 1, 2016, he was president and CEO of Holy Cross Health, a Catholic, not-for-profit health system in Maryland that is part of Trinity Health. As a medical officer in the United States Army, he served as Commanding General and CEO of Regional Health Command Europe, and Command Surgeon, U.S. Army Europe and Seventh Army, and earlier as the final head of the Walter Reed Army Medical Center and Walter Reed Health Care System in Washington, D.C. He retired as a brigadier general. He died June 12, 2024.

He is a member of the board of directors of Quality of Life Plus. He was named to the 2019 list of Physician Leaders to Know compiled by Becker's Hospital Review.

His father, W. Norvell Coots, was also a doctor.

== Education ==
Coots graduated from Regents College of the University of the State of New York (now Excelsior University).

== Publications ==
- Lesho, Emil; Braun, LoRanne; Coots, Norvell; Ozguc, Omer; Ciobanu, Mariana; Fitzpatrick, Laura (May 2002). "Disease prevalence among Moldovan orphans and other considerations for future humanitarian aid". Clinical Pediatrics. 41 (4): 235–237. doi:10.1177/000992280204100407. ISSN 0009-9228. PMID 12041720. S2CID 30054192.
- Ward, Katherine A.; Jaimes, Juan P.; Coots, Norvell V. (November 2012). "Cutaneous manifestations of acute radiation exposure: a review". International Journal of Dermatology. 51 (11): 1282–1291. doi:10.1111/j.1365-4632.2012.05609.x. ISSN 1365-4632. PMID 23067075. S2CID 46146420.
- Libow, Lester F.; Coots, Norvell V. (May 1998). "Lichen sclerosus following the lines of Blaschko". Journal of the American Academy of Dermatology. 38 (5): 831–833. doi:10.1016/S0190-9622(98)70468-2. PMID 9591796.
