= Jeannine M. Ryder =

American Air Force major general

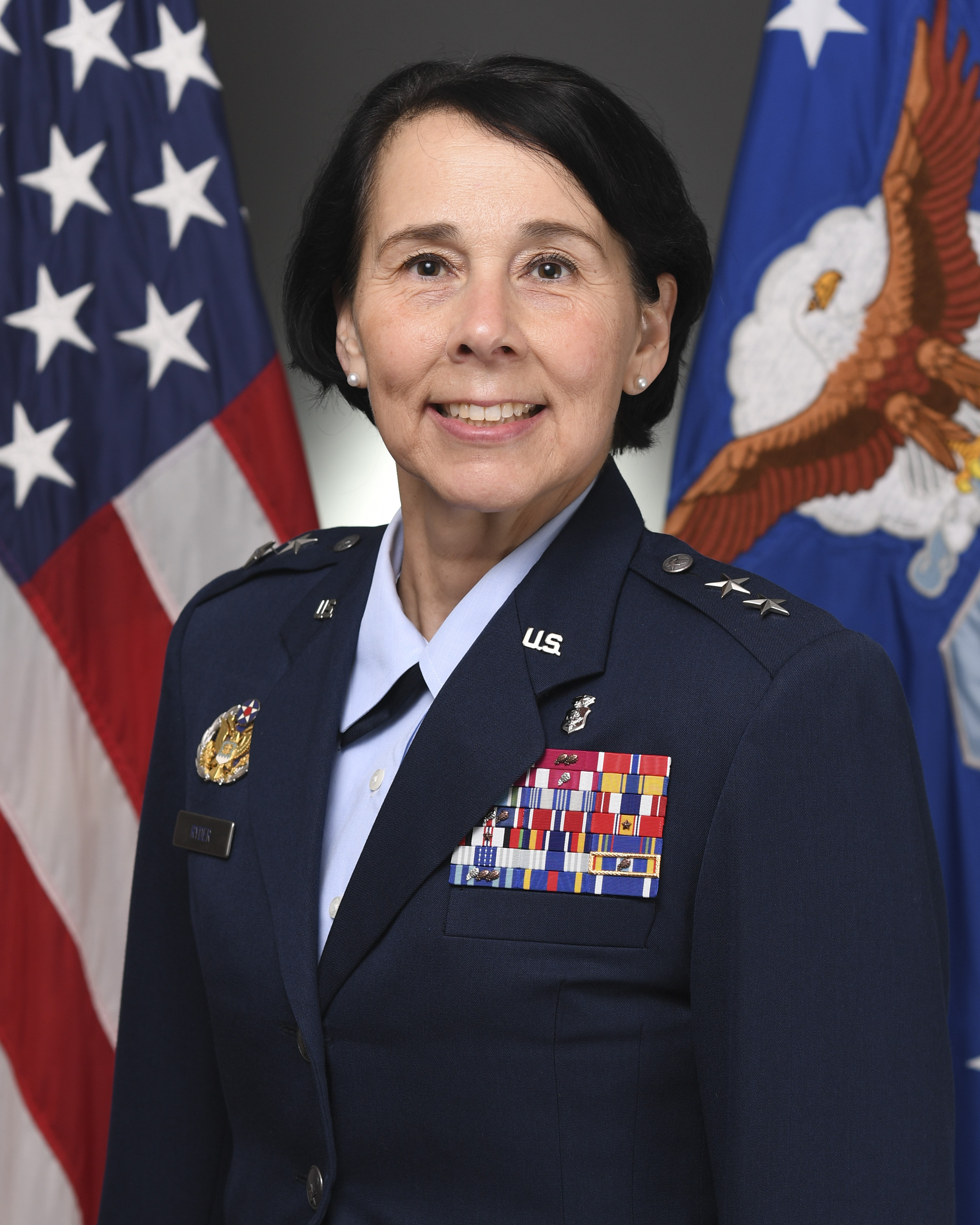
- Branch: U.S. Air Force
- Rank: Major General
- Commands: Chief, Air Force Nurse Corps Commander, Air Force Medical Agency
- Awards: Legion of Merit with oak leaf cluster Bronze Star Medal Defense Meritorious Service Medal Meritorious Service Medal with silver oak leaf cluster Air Force Commendation Medal

Jeannine M. Ryder is a U.S. Air Force major general; commander of the Air Force Medical Agency, Defense Health Headquarters, Falls Church, Virginia; and chief of the Air Force Nurse Corps.

The Air Force Medical Agency is responsible for the support and execution of medical readiness programs, expeditionary medical capabilities, and the direct support and implementation of policy, plans and programs for health care operations of the Air Force Medical Service to more than 44,000 personnel at 76 military treatment facilities.

As Chief Nurse of the Air Force, Ryder creates and evaluates policies and programs for 19,000 active-duty, Guard and Reserve nursing personnel. She interacts with Air Staff, Joint Staff, Department of Defense, Department of Veterans Affairs and civilian health care organizations to ensure the highest caliber of nursing care and personnel.

== Early life and education ==
Ryder, a Massachusetts native, is a graduate of Boston College, where she earned a Bachelor of Science degree in nursing. She earned her Master of Science in Human Relations from the University of Oklahoma, a Master of Arts and Science in Military Operations from the Air Command and Staff College, and a Master of Science in Strategic Studies from the Air War College.

Ryder was commissioned as a second lieutenant in 1991.

== Military career ==
Ryder's military career began in 1991 in the Nurse Intern Program (Obstetrics) at Langley Air Force Base, VA. She served as clinical nurse in the Obstetrical Unit, 36th Medical Group, Bitburg Air Base, and 52nd Medical Group at Spangdahlem Air Base, Germany, followed by an assignment in the Obstetrical Unit, 55th Medical Operations Squadron, Offutt Air Force Base, Nebraska.

She took on various leadership positions starting in 1996, to include deputy commander, Education and Training Flight at the 55th Medical Support Squadron; and director, Education and Training, and deputy director, Human Resources, 78th Medical Group at Robins Air Force Base, Georgia.

Ryder then served as nurse manager for the Primary Care Team and pediatric flight commander for the 436th Medical Operations Squadron, Dover Air Force Base, Delaware; and as deputy director, Communications Studies Course I, and executive officer to the Commandant at the Air Command and Staff College, Maxwell Air Force Base, Alabama. Ryder was then assigned to Kessler Air Force Base, Mississippi, where she served as the Maternal-Child Flight commander, 81st Inpatient Operations Squadron, followed by a deployment to Kabul, Afghanistan, as the executive officer/aide-de-camp, Combined Air Power Transition Force. Returning to Kessler Air Force Base, Ryder became the deputy commander, 81st Inpatient Operations Squadron and deputy chief nurse executive.

In 2009, Ryder took command of the 75th Medical Operations Squadron, Hill Air Force Base, Utah, before taking a position as chief, Strategic Medical Plans Division, Air Force Medical Service Agency, Defense Health Headquarters, Falls Church, Virginia.

Ryder also served as commander, 386th Expeditionary Medical Group, Southwest Asia; commander, 72nd Medical Group, Tinker Air Force Base, Oklahoma; commander, 81st Medical Group, Keesler Air Force Base; command surgeon, Headquarters Air Force Materiel Command, Wright-Patterson Air Force Base, Ohio; and commander, 711th Human Performance Wing, Wright-Patterson Air Force Base, Ohio.

On Aug. 3, 2020, Ryder was promoted to brigadier general at the National Museum of the United States Air Force, Wright-Patterson Air Force Base, Ohio. She also became the Chief of the Air Force Nurse Corps that year.

“I am humbled and honored to be provided the opportunity of this promotion and the ability of continued service in the Air Force,” Ryder said during her promotion ceremony. “I am fortunate to work with great Airmen and Medics and care for the most deserving patients in the world."

Ryder took command of the 59th Medical Wing during a change of command ceremony at the Inter-American Air Forces Academy Auditorium, Joint Base San Antonio-Lackland, April 29, 2021. Ryder led the Air Force Medical Service's largest healthcare, medical education and readiness platform comprising six groups and 8,400 personnel. The wing provides 900,000 clinic visits, 18,000 surgical procedures, and greater than 300 worldwide deployments annually.

Ryder also served as director, San Antonio Market, Defense Health Agency, directing and managing the overall operations and resources of an integrated, joint-service health system that provides health care to more than 250,000 military Tricare beneficiaries. The San Antonio Market includes Brooke Army Medical Center, Wilford Hall Ambulatory Surgical Center, 10 stand-alone military treatment facilities, and over 100 specialty services.

Ryder assumed command of the Air Force Medical Agency in September 2023. On Dec. 5, 2023, Senate confirmed Ryder's nomination for the rank of major general.

Ryder, an Air Force nurse, is the first female commander of two Air Force wings, the first female commander at Keesler Medical Center, the first female commander of the 711th Human Performance Wing in Air Force Research Laboratory, and the first female commander of the 59th Medical Wing.

== Awards and honors ==
=== Medals ===
Legion of Merit with oak leaf cluster
Bronze Star Medal
Defense Meritorious Service Medal with silver oak leaf cluster
Meritorious Service Medal
Air Force Commendation Medal
