= Eric Schoomaker =

Surgeon General of the US Army

Eric B. Schoomaker
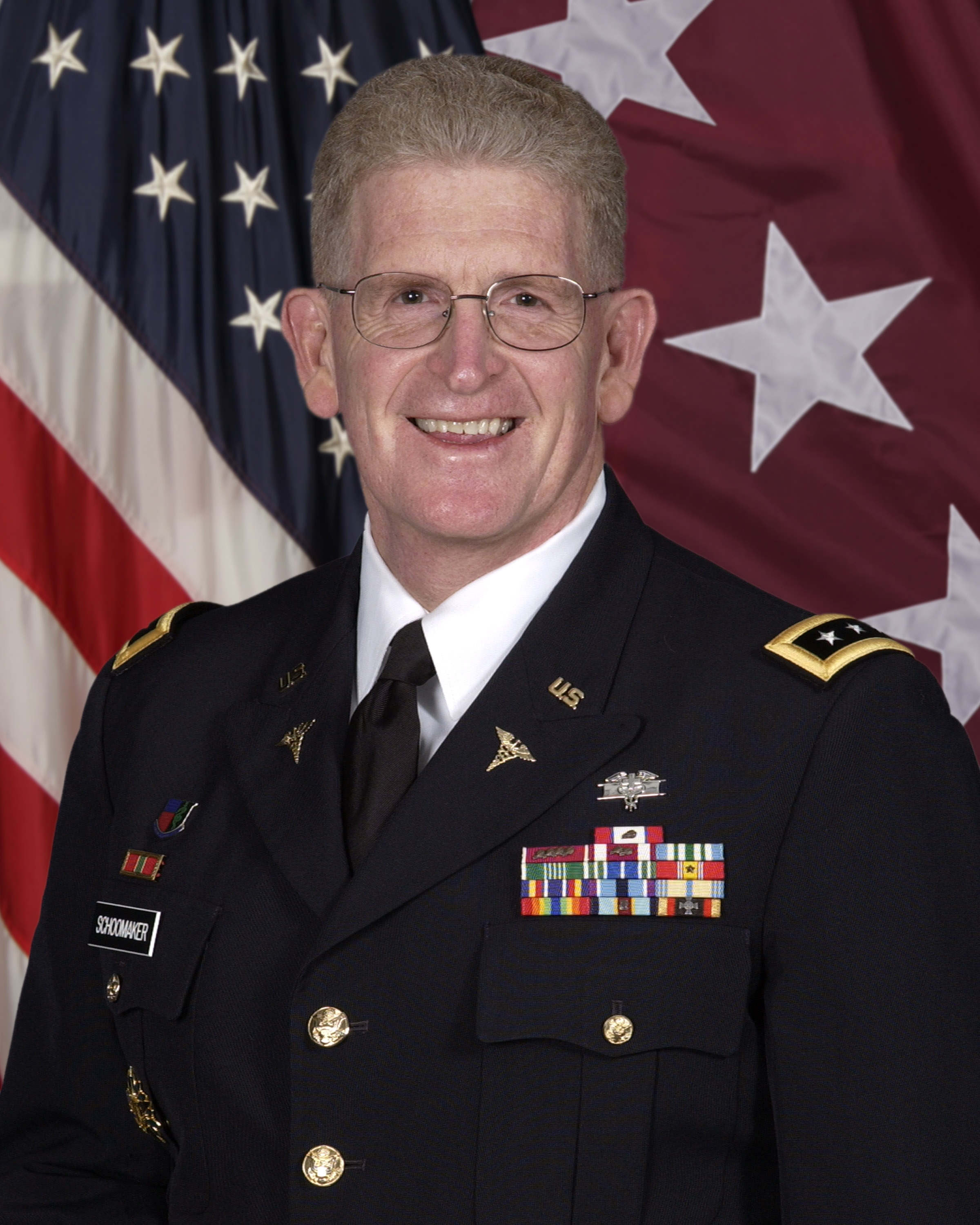
- Lieutenant General Eric B. Schoomaker
- Born: September 15, 1948 (age 78); Detroit, Michigan, U.S.
- Education: University of Michigan
- Relatives: GEN Peter Schoomaker (brother)
- Military career
- Allegiance: United States of America
- Branch: United States Army
- Service years: 1970–2012
- Rank: Lieutenant General
- Commands: Surgeon General of the United States Army; United States Army Medical Command; North Atlantic Regional Medical Command; Walter Reed Army Medical Center
- Awards: Army Distinguished Service Medal; Legion of Merit; Meritorious Service Medal; Joint Service Commendation Medal; Army Commendation Medal; Army Achievement Medal; Humanitarian Service Medal; Bundeswehr Crosses of Honor in Silver

Eric B. Schoomaker (born September 15, 1948) is a former United States Army lieutenant general who served as the 42nd Surgeon General of the United States Army and Commanding General, United States Army Medical Command, and a practicing hematologist. He previously served as Commanding General, North Atlantic Regional Medical Command and Walter Reed Army Medical Center. He assumed the post of U.S. Army Surgeon General on December 11, 2007.

== Early life and education ==
Schoomaker was born into an Army family in Detroit, Michigan. He is the younger brother of General Peter Schoomaker, USA, who served as the 35th Chief of Staff of the United States Army. He attended East Lansing High School. In 1970 he graduated from the University of Michigan in Ann Arbor, was commissioned a second lieutenant as a Distinguished Military Graduate, and awarded a bachelor of science degree. He received his medical degree from the University of Michigan Medical School in 1975 and completed his PhD in Human Genetics in 1979.

== Career ==
Schoomaker completed his internship and residency in internal medicine at Duke University Medical Center in Durham, North Carolina, from 1976 to 1978, followed by a fellowship in hematology at Duke University Medical Center in 1979. He is certified by the American Board of Internal Medicine in both internal medicine and hematology. His military education includes completion of the Combat Care Casualty Course, Medical Management of Chemical Casualty Care Course, AMEDD Officer Advanced Course, Command and General Staff College, and the U.S. Army War College.

Schoomaker has held a wide variety of assignments. From 1979 until 1982, he was a research hematologist at Walter Reed Army Institute of Research. He served as Assistant Chief and Program Director, Department of Medicine, Walter Reed Army Medical Center, from 1982 to 1988; Medical Consultant to Headquarters, 7th Medical Command, Heidelberg, Germany, 1988–1990; Deputy Commander for Clinical Services, Landstuhl Army Regional Medical Center, Landstuhl, Germany, 1990–1992; Chief and Program Director, Department of Medicine and Director of Primary Care, Madigan Army Medical Center, Tacoma, Washington, 1992–1995; Director of Medical Education for the Office of The Surgeon General/HQ USAMEDCOM conducting a split operation between Washington, DC, and Fort Sam Houston, Texas, 1995–1997; and Director of Clinical Operations at the HQ USAMEDCOM, February to July 1997. From July 1997 to July 1999, he commanded the USA MEDDAC (Evans Army Community Hospital) at Fort Carson, Colorado. He attended the U.S. Army War College in Carlisle Barracks, Pennsylvania, from 1999 to 2000 followed by assignments as the Command Surgeon for the U.S. Army Forces Command (FORSCOM) from July 2000 to March 2001, and Commander of the 30th Medical Brigade headquartered in Heidelberg, Germany, from April 2001 to June 2002.

In August 2002, The Army Surgeon General appointed General Schoomaker to the position of Chief of the Army Medical Corps. Prior to commanding at Fort Detrick, he was the Commanding General of the Southeast Regional Medical Command/Dwight David Eisenhower Army Medical Center from June 2002 to June 2005. Schoomaker was then the commanding general of the U.S. Army Medical Research and Materiel Command at Fort Detrick until March 2007. From March until December 11, 2007, he was commander of the North Atlantic Regional Medical Command and Walter Reed Army Medical Center. From December 11, 2007, to December 5, 2011, Schoomaker served as the 42nd Surgeon General of the United States Army and Commanding General, United States Army Medical Command.

He currently teaches at Uniformed Services University of the Health Sciences.

== Legacy ==
Schoomaker has been honored with the Order of Military Medical Merit and the "A" proficiency designator and holds the Expert Field Medical Badge.

== Personal life ==
Schoomaker has three children.

== Awards and decorations ==
Expert Field Medical Badge
Army Staff Identification Badge

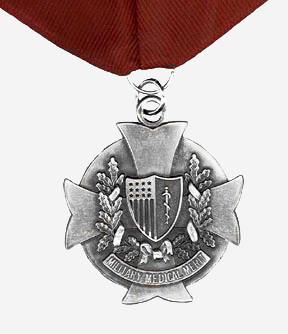
Army Distinguished Service Medal with oak leaf cluster
Legion of Merit with four oak leaf clusters
Meritorious Service Medal with two oak leaf clusters
Joint Service Commendation Medal
Army Commendation Medal
Army Achievement Medal
Superior Unit Award
National Defense Service Medal with service star
Global War on Terrorism Service Medal
Humanitarian Service Medal
Armed Forces Reserve Medal
Army Service Ribbon
Overseas Service Ribbon with award numeral 2
Bundeswehr Cross of Honor in Silver
Order of Military Medical Merit

Military offices
Preceded by Lt. Gen. Kevin C. Kiley	Commanding General of Walter Reed Army Medical Center; March 2, 2007 – October 2007	Succeeded by Maj. Gen. Carla Hawley-Bowland
Preceded by Maj. Gen. Gale Pollack (Acting)	Surgeon General of the United States Army; December 11, 2007 – December 5, 2011	Succeeded by Lt. Gen. Patricia D. Horoho
