= Jimmie O. Keenan =

American military official

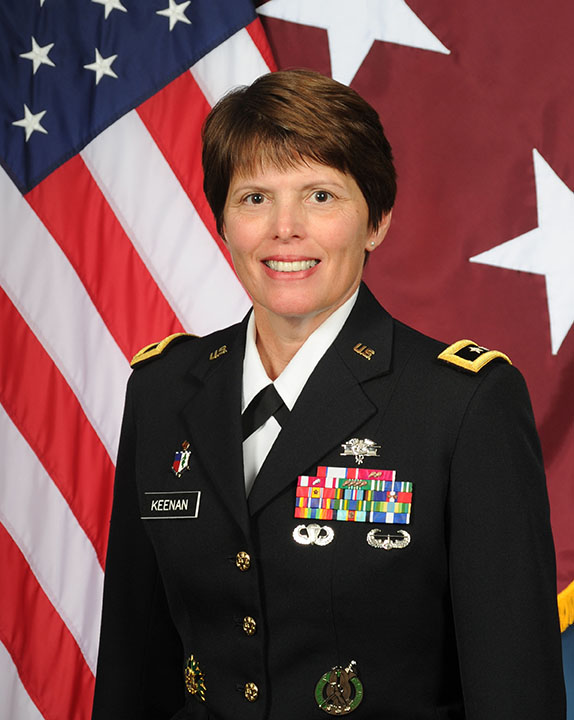
- Major General Jimmie O. Keenan in 2015
- Military career
- Allegiance: United States
- Branch: United States Army
- Rank: Major General
- Commands: Chief of the Army Nurse Corps; United States Army Southern Regional Medical Command; United States Army Public Health Command; Evans Army Community Hospital
- Awards: Army Distinguished Service Medal; Legion of Merit (3); Meritorious Service Medal (6); Army Commendation Medal (5); Army Achievement Medal

Jimmie O. Keenan is a retired major general of the United States Army. She served as the Deputy Commanding General of the Medical Command and also the Chief of the United States Army Nurse Corps before retiring on January 1, 2016. She now works at WellMed Medical Management in San Antonio, Texas.

== Military career ==
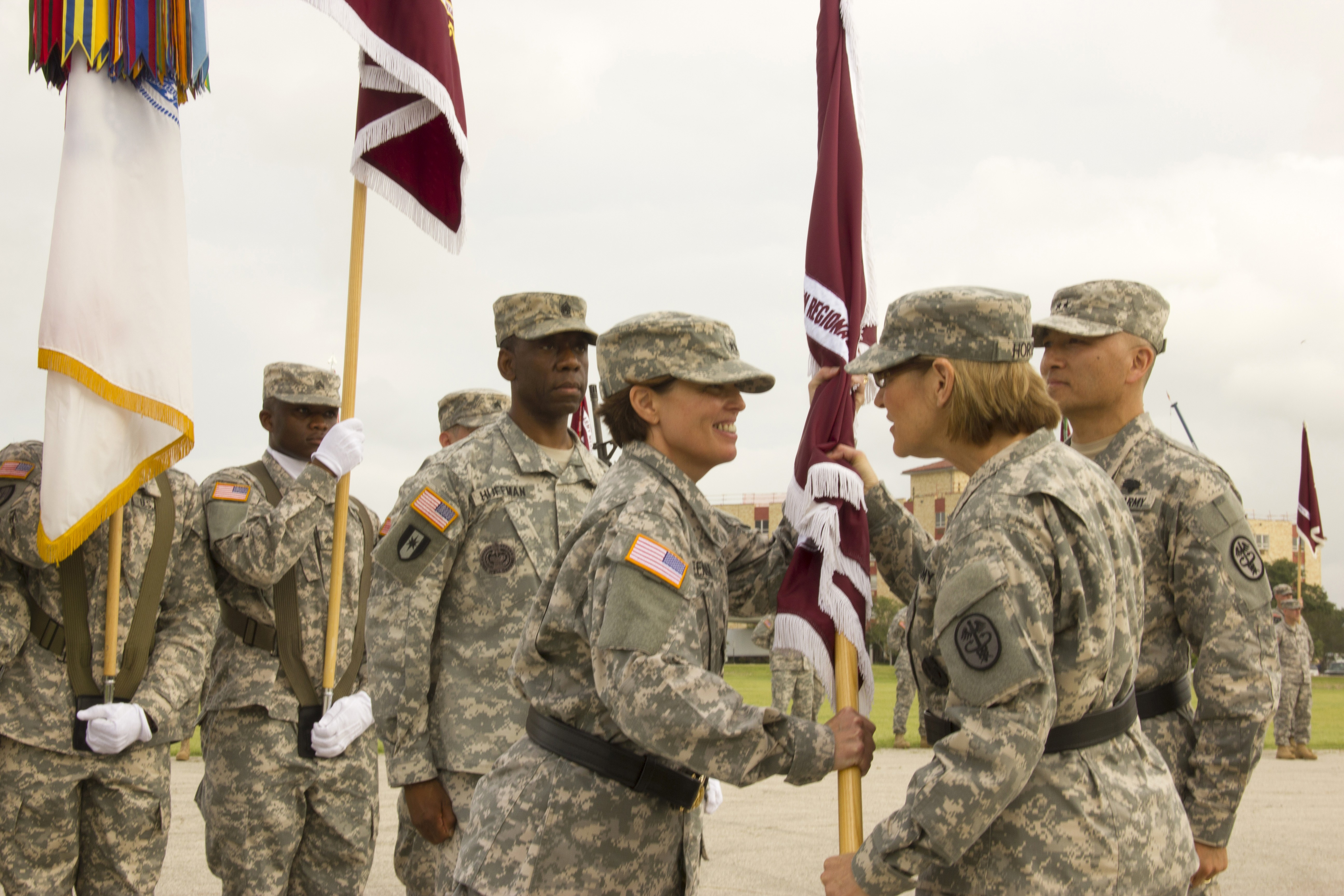
Lieutenant General Patricia D. Horoho passes the Southern Regional Medical Command guidon to Major General Jimmie O. Keenan (left) during a change of command ceremony on June 6, 2013.

Keenan entered the United States Army as a Nurse Corps Officer commissioned through Reserve Officer Training Corps at Henderson State University. She completed a variety of assignments such as nursing at domestic and overseas facilities of the United States Army, and eventually rising to the post of Commander, Evans Army Community Hospital in Fort Carson, Colorado. She also commanded United States Army Public Health Command in Aberdeen Proving Ground. Her last assignment, prior to assuming deputy command of the United States Army Medical Command (MEDCOM), was Commanding General, United States Army Southern Regional Medical Command.

Keenan is a Distinguished Military Graduate from Henderson State University with a Baccalaureate of Nursing. She also holds a Master of Science in Nursing Administration from the Medical College of Georgia and a Masters in Strategic Studies from the United States Army War College. Her military education includes the Army Medical Department Officer Basic and Advance Courses, the United States Army Command and General Staff College and the United States Army War College.

Keenan's awards and decorations include the Army Distinguished Service Medal, Legion of Merit, Meritorious Service Medal with four Oak Leaf Clusters, Army Commendation Medal with four Oak Leaf Clusters, and Army Achievement Medal. She has earned the Expert Field Medical Badge, the Parachutist Badge, the Air Assault Badge, and the Army Staff Identification Badge. Keenan was the General Douglas MacArthur Leadership Award winner for the Health Services Command in 1988, a Regional Finalist, White House Fellowship Program in 1992, and an Army Congressional Fellow for FY 2001. She is a member of the Order of Military Medical Merit and a Fellow in the American College of Healthcare Executives.
