= Walter Reid (footballer) =

Scottish footballer

Personal information
- Date of birth: 1869
- Place of birth: Scotland
- Position: Full-back

Senior career*
Years	Team	Apps	(Gls)
- St Bernard's
1888–1893	Grimsby Town	10	(0)
- * Club domestic league appearances and goals

Walter Reid (born 1869) was a Scottish professional footballer who played as a full-back.
