= Deydre Teyhen =

Army general

Deydre S. Teyhen
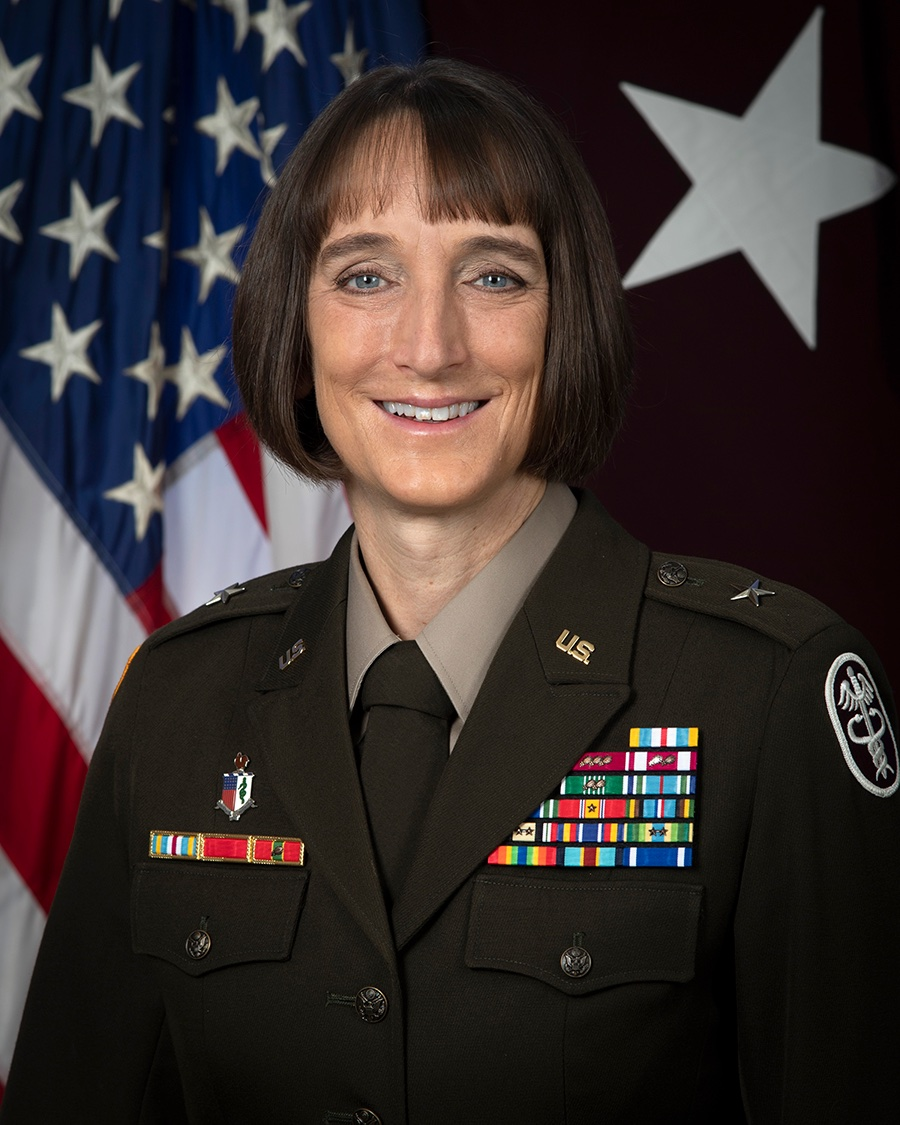
- Born: 1971 (age 54–55); Canton, Ohio, United States
- Military career
- Branch: United States Army
- Rank: Brigadier General
- Commands: 20th Chief of the Army Medical Specialist Corps 2022–2023: Commanding General, Brooke Army Medical Center; 2022–2023: Deputy Market Director, San Antonio Market, Defense Health Agency; 2023-2025: Director, Defense Health Network, National Capital Region; 2025-2026: Commanding General, Medical Readiness Command, Pacific 2025-2026: Director, Defense Health Network, IndoPacific
- Awards: Army Distinguished Service Medal Defense Superior Service Medal (one Oak Leaf Cluster) Legion of Merit (four Oak Leaf Clusters) Army Medical Department Order of Military Medical Merit (O2M3) Surgeon General's "A" Proficiency Designator U.S. Army War College Commandant's Award for Distinction in Research Catherine Worthingham Fellow of the American Physical Therapy Association Dissertation Award from the University of Texas American Physical Therapy Association, Margaret L. Moore Award for Outstanding New Academic Faculty Member Inducted into the Kinesiology and Health Education Distinguished Alumna Hall of Honor, University of Texas.

Deydre Smyth Teyhen (born 1971) is a U.S. Army (Retired) brigadier general and previously served as the 20th Chief of the Army Medical Specialist Corps. Teyhen's last assignment in the Army was as the Commanding General, U.S. Army Medical Readiness Command, Pacific and the Director, Defense Health Network - IndoPacific. Other assignments as a General Officer included Director, Defense Health Network - National Capital Region and as Commanding General, Brooke Army Medical Center (BAMC), and the Deputy Market Director, San Antonio Market, Defense Health Agency. Teyhen, a physical therapist, is the Army's first active-duty Medical Specialist Corps officer and physical therapist promoted to brigadier general.

Teyhen, a commissioned officer for almost 33 years, has held many command and staff positions. Of note, Teyhen served as the Deputy Chief of Staff (Support, G-1/4/6) at the Office of the Surgeon General in Falls Church, Virginia. During the pandemic, she served as the Department of Defense's Lead of Therapeutics for Operation Warp Speed at the U.S. Department of Health and Human Services and as the Commander for Walter Reed Army Institute of Research, the DoD's largest biomedical research facility. In these roles, she led infectious disease, brain, and behavioral health research efforts; including research to prevent, detect, and treat COVID-19.

At BAMC, Teyhen served as Commanding General to nearly 9,000 personnel, the Military Health System's largest and most complex hospital and sole Level I Trauma Center, located on Joint Base San Antonio-Fort Sam Houston. She was dual-hatted as Chief of the Army Medical Specialist Corps. The Army Medical Specialist Corps comprises four Army officer areas of concentration: 65A Army Occupational Therapists (OT), 65B Army Physical Therapists, 65C Army Dietitians and 65D Army Physician Assistants (PA). Teyhen also serves as Deputy Market Director, San Antonio Market, Defense Health Agency, which works to optimize personnel and resources and improve access to care for more than 250,000 military beneficiaries across San Antonio, Texas, and surrounding areas.

== Early life and education ==
Teyhen received her Bachelor of Arts in Sports Science at Ohio Wesleyan University. She earned her master's degree in Physical Therapy from the U.S. Army-Baylor University, completed her PhD in Biomechanics from the University of Texas, and earned her Doctor of Physical Therapy from Baylor University. Teyhen graduated with honors as a distinguished graduate from the U.S. Army War College with a master's degree in Strategic Studies.

Teyhen completed more education and led various organizations before becoming a Brigadier General in July 2022.

== Military career ==
Teyhen has held a variety of command and staff positions over the course of her ~33-year career.

She has served as Commander, U.S. Army Health Clinic Schofield Barracks, Hawaii; Assistant Chief of Staff, Public Health at the Office of the Army Surgeon General; Commander, Public Health Command Region-South; Deputy Director, Telemedicine and Advanced Technology Research Center at Fort Detrick, Md.; Associate Professor and Director of the Center for Physical Therapy Research for the U.S. Army Baylor University Doctoral Program in Physical Therapy on Fort Sam Houston, Texas; Officer-in-Charge of Task Force 10 Delta Med in Iraq; Chief of Musculoskeletal Care Center and Chief of Physical Therapy at Kimbrough Ambulatory Care Center, Fort Meade; Chief of Outpatient Physical Therapy at Walter Reed Army Medical Center, Washington, D.C.; Chief of Physical Therapy, 21st Combat Support Hospital in Bosnia; and Physical Therapist at (then) Carl R. Darnall Army Community Hospital at Fort Hood, Texas

During the pandemic, she served as the Department of Defense's Lead of Therapeutics for Operation Warp Speed at the U.S. Department of Health and Human Services and as Commander, Walter Reed Army Institute of Research, the DoD's largest biomedical research facility. She led infectious disease, brain, and behavioral health research efforts; including research to prevent, detect and treat COVID-19.

Teyhen also served as the Deputy Chief of Staff (Support, G-1/4/6) at the Office of the Surgeon General in Falls Church, Virginia.

On June 24, 2021, the Senate confirmed the nomination of Teyhen to be promoted to brigadier general. Teyhen's historic promotion as the Army's first active duty Medical Specialist Corps officer and physical therapist to become a general officer took place on July 8, 2022. “This day could not have been possible without those that invested in me – that were senior to me that saw something and wanted to," she said at the promotion ceremony. "And also those who paved the way that showed the value of what a Specialist Corps officer can bring to the fight."

Teyhen assumed command of Brooke Army Medical Center during a ceremony July 19, 2022.

Her research accomplishments include over 225 peer-reviewed publications, editorials, book chapters, and published abstracts; 120 presentations at conferences; and 150 lectures.

== Awards and honors ==
=== Medals ===
Army Distinguished Service Medal
Defense Superior Service Medal with one oak leaf cluster
Legion of Merit with five oak leaf clusters
Meritorious Service Medal with one silver and one oak leaf cluster
Army Commendation Medal with three oak leaf clusters
Joint Service Achievement Medal
Army Achievement Medal with three leaf cluster
