= Walter Reed Army Medical Center neglect scandal =

U.S. medical scandal

The Walter Reed Army Medical Center neglect scandal refers to a series of allegations of unsatisfactory conditions, treatment of patients, and management at the Walter Reed Army Medical Center (WRAMC) in Washington, D.C., culminating in two articles published by The Washington Post in February 2007. Several cases of patient neglect and shoddy living conditions were reported as early as 2004. "Soldiers suffering from traumatic brain injuries or stress disorders, others with amputated limbs, have languished for weeks and months on end in vermin-infested quarters waiting for a decision on their military status and a ruling on the level of benefits they will receive if they are discharged and transferred to the civilian-run Veterans Administration (VA) healthcare system." When the scandal broke, soldiers were pressured to keep quiet and punished with daily inspections for speaking to the press. Significant public and media attention was generated, which in turn prompted a number of congressional and executive actions, including resignations of several high-ranking officers.

== Initial exposure ==
The Washington Post published a series of articles beginning February 18, 2007, outlining cases of neglect at Walter Reed reported by wounded soldiers and their family members. Although the article focused primarily on Building 18, a former hotel just outside the post's main gates, authors Dana Priest and Anne Hull also included complaints about "disengaged clerks, unqualified platoon sergeants and overworked managers" that make navigating the already complicated bureaucracy to obtain medical care at WRAMC even more daunting. Although army officials claimed to be surprised at these conditions, a Salon.com series beginning in January 2005 had previously exposed them. In 2004 and 2005, articles appeared in the Post and in Salon interviewing First Lieutenant Julian Goodrum about his court martial for seeking medical care elsewhere due to poor conditions at WRAMC.

== Deaths ==
Due to neglect and administrative mismanagement, one outpatient soldier at Walter Reed drank himself to death, and two others died in a high-speed car accident even though the driver was supposed to be restricted to medical center grounds because of past use of illegal drugs. A therapist's mistake led to the death of another wounded veteran, according to Congressman Bill Young. Other Walter Reed-related deaths resulted from preventable suicides, avoidable drug overdoses, and "murders that never should have happened".

== Building 18 ==
WRAMC's Building 18 was described in the Washington Post article as rat- and cockroach-infested, with stained carpets, cheap mattresses, and black mold, with some soldiers reporting no heat or water in the facility. The unmonitored entrance created security problems, including reports of drug dealers in front of the facility. Injured soldiers stated they were forced to "pull guard duty" to have some level of security. In an attempt to alleviate the toll that Building 18's condition was taking on the wounded soldiers, a staff team headed by a clinical social worker at WRAMC obtained a grant of $30,000 from the Commander's Initiative Account for improvements; however, "a Psychiatry Department functionary held up the rest of the money because she feared that buying a lot of recreational equipment close to Christmas would trigger an audit." By January, the funds were no longer available.

The problems associated with Building 18 were not new to the Walter Reed Army Medical Center community. As early as 1999, the extensive problems with Building 18 were identified to senior level leadership, and funding for renovations and improvements were denied. Prior to its role housing wounded warriors, Building 18 had long served as the barracks of WRAMC Student Company. Between 1999 and 2001, under the command of then Captain Michael D. Dake, the Student Company leadership identified the deplorable conditions in and around Building 18 to two Medical Center Brigade Commanders (Colonel Terry D. Carroll, and Colonel Larry S. Bolton respectively). By 2002, the requests for funding to improve conditions in and around Building 18 had made it to the attention of Major General Kevin C. Kiley. Kiley, who toured the facility as part of his commander's in-brief after arriving in June, personally inspected the facility and spoke to the soldiers and the leadership. He then also denied funding for improvements. By 2004, renovation of Building 18 had been anticipated in connection with the enhanced use lease of Building 40, but since the post was slated for closure under BRAC in 2005, the anticipated in-kind services by the Building 40 developer did not materialize.

Although the Post's authors are quick to point out that "not all the quarters are as bleak as" Building 18, "the despair of Building 18 symbolizes a larger problem in Walter Reed's treatment of the wounded. The typical soldier is required to file 22 documents with eight different commands – most of them off-post – to enter and exit the medical processing world, according to government investigators. Sixteen different information systems are used to process the forms, but few of them can communicate with one another. The army's three personnel databases cannot read each other's files and can't interact with the separate pay system or the medical recordkeeping databases." This complicated system has required some soldiers to prove they were in the Iraq War or the War in Afghanistan in order to obtain medical treatment and benefits because Walter Reed employees are unable to locate their records.

After Walter Reed Army Medical Center moved its operations to Walter Reed National Military Medical Center in 2011, the Army sold Building 18 and much of the rest of the campus to the local Washington, D.C., government. The city razed the building in 2015 and built a new station for the District of Columbia Fire and Emergency Medical Services Department. The new station opened in 2018, housing Engine Company 22, which moved from a location about one mile south on Georgia Avenue.

== Consequences ==
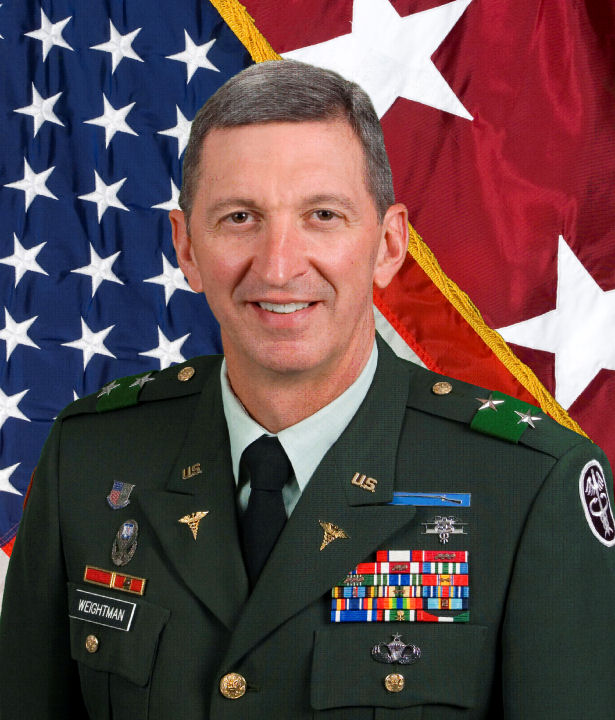
Maj. Gen. George W. Weightman, commander of Walter Reed, relieved of duty March 1

Less than a week after the article, new Defense Secretary Robert Gates visited Walter Reed and said those responsible would be "held accountable":

I endorse the decision by Secretary of the Army Fran Harvey to relieve the Commander, Major General George W. Weightman of the Walter Reed Army Medical Center. The care and welfare of our wounded men and women in uniform demand the highest standard of excellence and commitment that we can muster as a government. When this standard is not met, I will insist on swift and direct corrective action and, where appropriate, accountability up the chain of command.

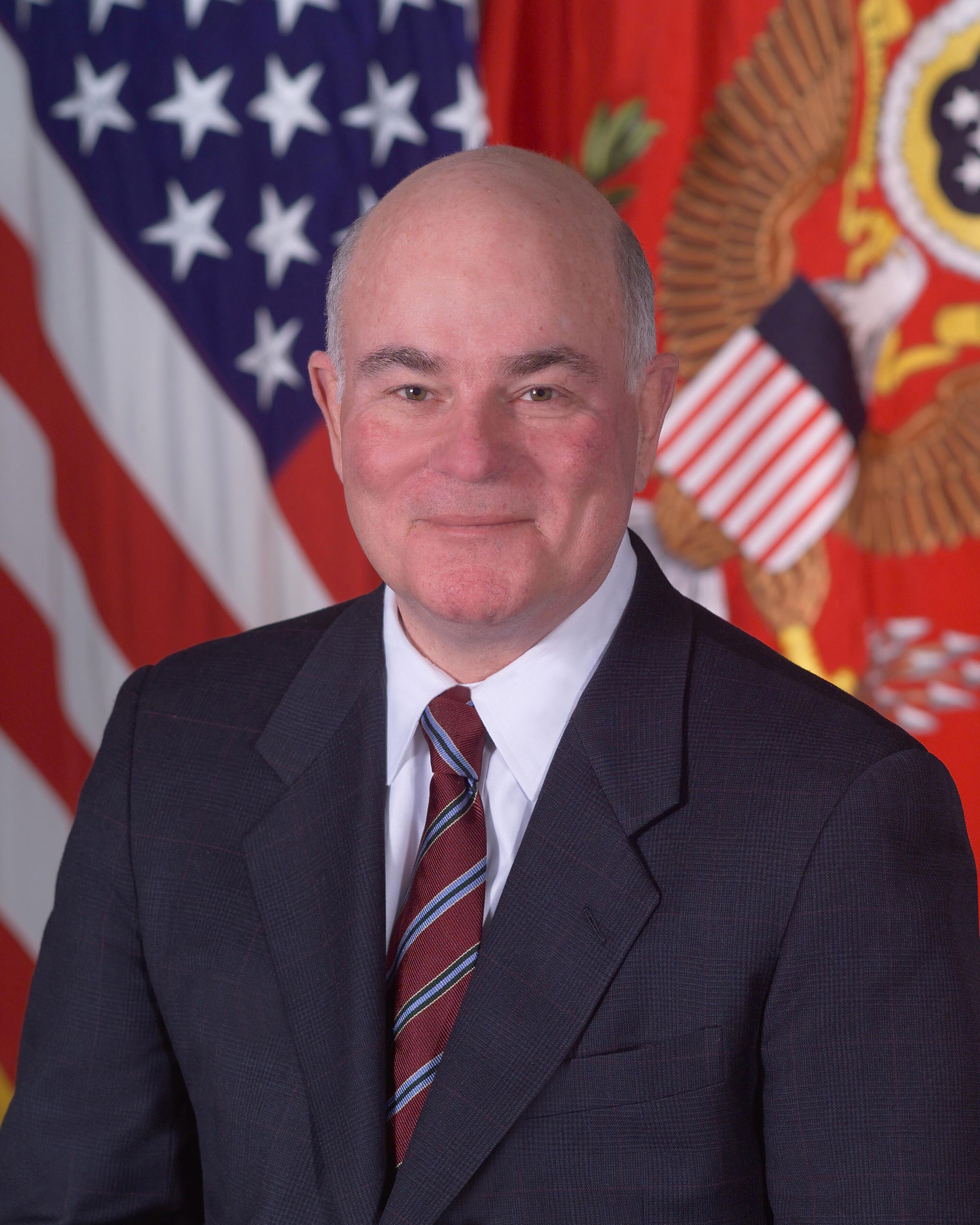
Francis J. Harvey, Secretary of the Army, resigned March 2.

The army announced it had relieved of command Major General Weightman, a physician who had headed the hospital for only six months. In a brief announcement, the Army said service leaders had "lost trust and confidence" in Weightman's leadership abilities "to address needed solutions for soldier outpatient care." It said the decision to fire him was made by Secretary of the Army Francis J. Harvey.

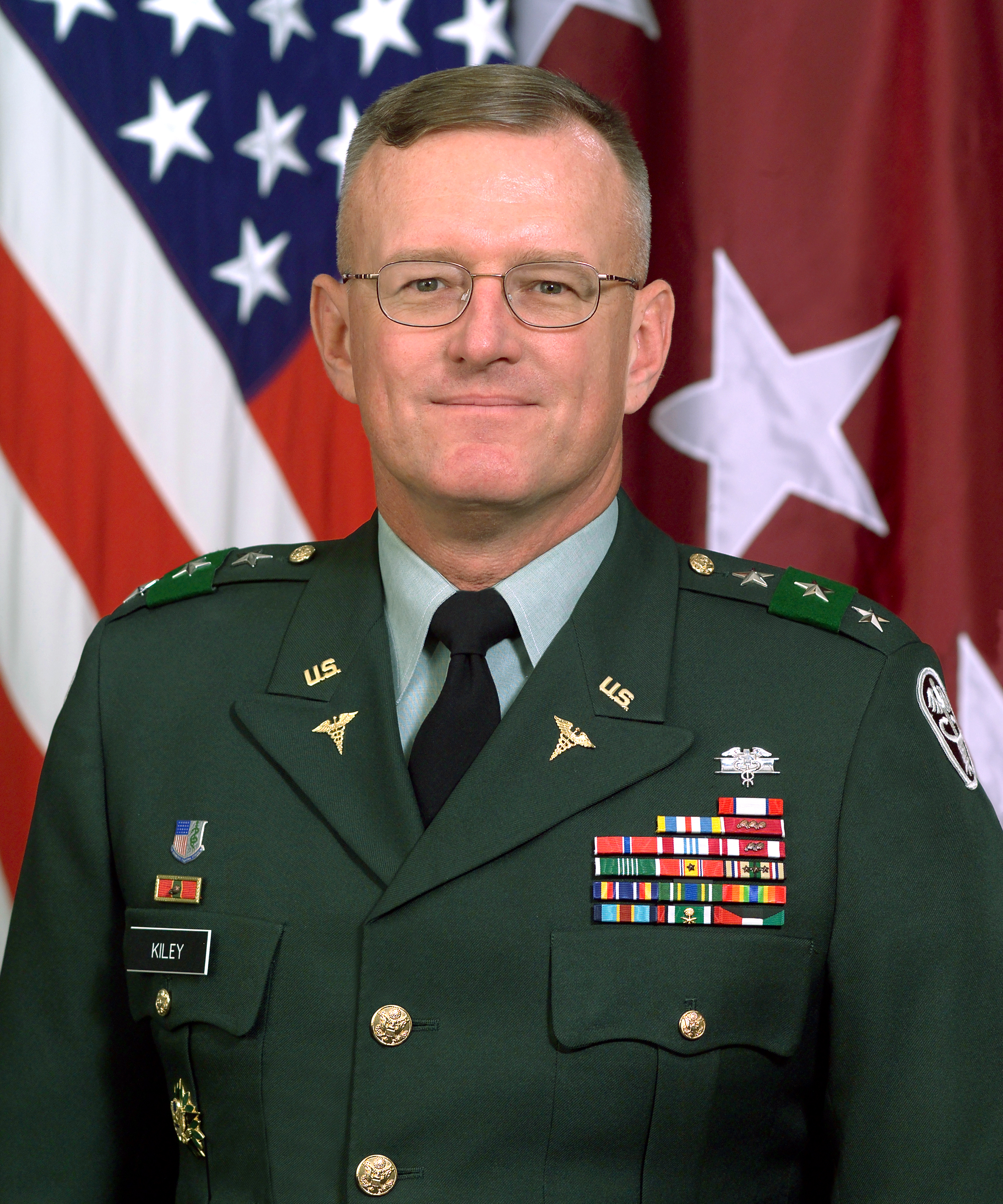
Lt. Gen. Kevin C. Kiley, Army Surgeon General and ex-commander of Walter Reed, submitted retirement on March 12

Harvey then named Army Surgeon General and former Walter Reed commander Kevin Kiley as interim commander, but Harvey himself was forced to resign by Gates on March 2. Gates felt Harvey wasn't getting the army to move fast enough on making necessary changes. Major General Eric Schoomaker was named the new commander of Walter Reed on March 2. On the same day that Kiley was named, the Post reported that he had been aware of the issues at Walter Reed from his command in 2003, including the fact that a patient had been sleeping in his own urine. Kiley himself retired on March 12, 2007 after acting Army Secretary Pete Geren asked for Kiley's resignation.

An internal WRAMC memorandum from September 2006 warned that the personnel shortage caused by an outsourcing of public works services put WRAMC in danger of "mission failure".

In response, on March 6, President George W. Bush announced that former Senate Majority Leader Bob Dole and former Secretary of Health and Human Services Donna Shalala, who was then serving as President of the University of Miami, would head a commission – President's Commission on Care for America's Returning Wounded Warriors – investigating deficiencies in the current military and VA healthcare systems. The remaining Commission members included two veterans wounded in Operation Iraqi Freedom, the wife of an army Staff Sergeant severely burned in Iraq, the chairman and CEO of a non-for-profit organization that constructs "comfort homes" for families of hospitalized military servicemembers, two leaders in the health care industry, and an expert on veterans affairs and military health care. This commission released their final report on July 26, 2007, and issued their findings in testimony to the U.S. Subcommittee on National Security and Foreign Affairs on September 26, 2007.

The scandal at Walter Reed led to an extensive analysis of the veterans' healthcare system as well, managed by the United States Department of Veterans' Affairs. Amidst accusations of mismanagement and excessive bureaucracy, the VA announced an extensive review of all of their medical facilities to ensure healthcare standards are being met.

By 2011, the Army had hired new staff – about 3,500 – to help care for the wounded soldiers, and set up Warrior Transition Units at Walter Reed and around the nation, 29 in all, that now care for about 10,000 soldiers.

== See also ==
- Veterans Health Administration scandal of 2014
