= Peter Schoomaker =

Retired US Army general (born 1946)

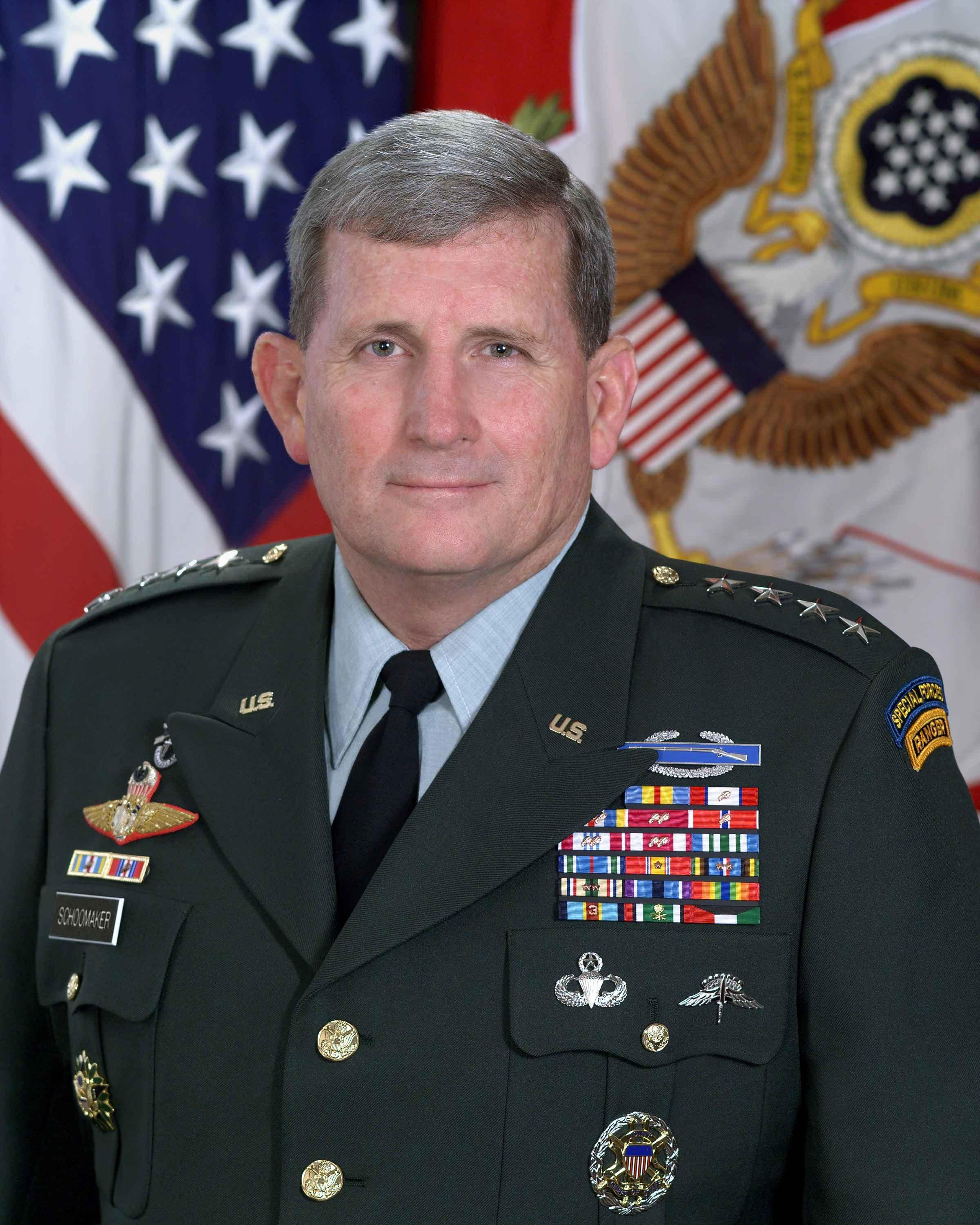
- Schoomaker in c. 2004
- Born: 12 February 1946 (age 80); Detroit, Michigan, U.S.
- Relatives: Eric Schoomaker (brother)
- Military career
- Allegiance: United States
- Branch: United States Army
- Service years: 1969–2000; 2003–2007
- Rank: General
- Commands: Chief of Staff of the United States Army; United States Special Operations Command; United States Army Special Operations Command; Joint Special Operations Command; Delta Force
- Conflicts: Operation Eagle Claw; Operation Just Cause; Gulf War
- Awards: Defense Distinguished Service Medal (3); Army Distinguished Service Medal (3); Defense Superior Service Medal (4); Legion of Merit (3); Bronze Star Medal (2); Defense Meritorious Service Medal (3); Meritorious Service Medal (3)

Peter Jan Schoomaker (born 12 February 1946) is a retired four-star general of the United States Army who served as the 35th Chief of Staff of the United States Army from August 2003 to April 2007. Schoomaker's appointment as Chief of Staff was unusual in that he was recalled and came out from retirement to assume the position. Schoomaker voluntarily retired from the Army for the second time in 2007 after completing the full four-year term as Chief of Staff.

Prior to his last assignment, Schoomaker spent over 30 years in a variety of assignments with both conventional and special operations forces – he was the first Special Forces-trained Army Chief of Staff and the second to serve on the Joint Chiefs of Staff (General Henry H. Shelton was the first, when he served as Chairman).

His brother, Lieutenant General Eric Schoomaker, was the 42nd Surgeon General of the United States Army.

== Early life and education ==
Schoomaker was born on 12 February 1946, in Detroit, Michigan. He was raised in an army family. After attending East Lansing High School, Schoomaker graduated from the University of Wyoming in 1969 with a Bachelor of Science degree in education administration. A football player, he was a starter on Wyoming's Sugar Bowl team. He holds a Master of Arts degree in management from Central Michigan University, and an Honorary Doctorate of Laws from Hampden–Sydney College. Schoomaker attended the United States Army Command and General Staff College from August 1981 to June 1982 and the National War College from August 1988 to June 1989.

== Military career ==
Schoomaker participated in numerous deployment operations including Eagle Claw in Iran, Urgent Fury in Grenada, Just Cause in Panama, Operation Desert Shield/Desert Storm in Southwest Asia, Uphold Democracy in Haiti, and supported various other operations.

After being commissioned as a second lieutenant after participating in the Reserve Officers' Training Corps program at the University of Wyoming, Schoomaker went to the United States Army Armor School at Fort Knox. He soon became a Reconnaissance Platoon Leader and Rifle Company Commander with 2nd Battalion, 4th Infantry, and a Cavalry Troop Commander with 1st Squadron, 2nd Armored Cavalry Regiment in Germany. He then served in Korea as the S-3 of 1st Battalion, 73rd Cavalry, 2nd Infantry Division. From 1978 to 1981, he commanded a squadron of the 1st Special Forces Operational Detachment – Delta (1st SFOD-D), commonly known to the public as "Delta Force", at Fort Bragg, North Carolina. Following a year at the army's Command and General Staff College at Fort Leavenworth, Kansas, Schoomaker served as the Squadron Executive Officer, 2nd Squadron, 2nd Armored Cavalry Regiment in Germany. In August 1983, he returned to Fort Bragg, to serve as Special Operations Officer, J-3, Joint Special Operations Command. From August 1985 to August 1988, Schoomaker commanded another squadron of the 1st SFOD-D. Following the National War College in Washington, D.C., he returned to command Delta Force from June 1989 to July 1992. Subsequently, Schoomaker served as the Assistant Division Commander of the 1st Cavalry Division, Fort Hood, Texas, followed by a tour in the Headquarters, Department of the Army staff as the Deputy Director for Operations, Readiness and Mobilization.

Schoomaker served as the Commanding General of the Joint Special Operations Command from July 1994 to August 1996, followed by command of the United States Army Special Operations Command at Fort Bragg, North Carolina through October 1997. His most recent assignment prior to assuming duties as the Army Chief of Staff was as Commander, United States Special Operations Command at MacDill Air Force Base, Florida, from November 1997 to November 2000, after which he retired from the Army. According to the 9/11 Commission, Schoomaker wanted to take action against Al Qaeda in Afghanistan using his special operators but was unable to gain approval for the mission.

In the summer of 2003, after the retirement of Eric Shinseki, and Jack Keane declining the appointment, Schoomaker returned to active duty to serve as 35th Chief of Staff of the United States Army at the request of Secretary of Defense Donald Rumsfeld. As the chief of staff, Schoomaker was credited with leading the Army through its largest reorganization since World War II, while it was engaged in combat in Iraq and Afghanistan. He retired at the end of his tour of duty as chief of staff in April 2007, giving the post to George W. Casey Jr.

== Post-military career ==
After his retirement from active duty, Schoomaker served as a Director for DynCorp, as well as on the advisory boards of Camber Corporation and EWA-Government Systems Inc. Concurrently, Schoomaker was the Director of CAE USA Inc. from November 2007 to February 2009, where he still serves a member of the Human Resources Committee as well as an independent director and consultant on defense matters. Schoomaker is also currently a Director of Aeroflex Incorporated and several private and non-profit companies, including the Special Operations Warrior Foundation. In 2018, Peter Schoomaker joined MAG Aerospace's board of directors.

== Dates of rank ==
Rank	Date
Second lieutenant	1 June 1969
First lieutenant	4 June 1970
Captain	4 June 1971
Major	13 July 1979
Lieutenant colonel	1 July 1985
Colonel	1 June 1990
Brigadier general	1 January 1993
Major general	1 March 1996
Lieutenant general	28 August 1996
General	4 October 1997

== Decorations and badges ==
Personal decorations
Defense Distinguished Service Medal (with two bronze oak leaf clusters)
Army Distinguished Service Medal (with two bronze oak leaf clusters)
Defense Superior Service Medal (with three oak leaf clusters)
Legion of Merit (with two oak leaf clusters)
Bronze Star Medal (with oak leaf cluster)
Defense Meritorious Service Medal (with two oak leaf clusters)
Meritorious Service Medal (with two oak leaf clusters)
Joint Service Commendation Medal
Joint Service Achievement Medal
Unit Awards
Joint Meritorious Unit Award (with oak leaf cluster)
Valorous Unit Award (with oak leaf cluster)
Campaign and service medals
National Defense Service Medal (with award star)
Armed Forces Expeditionary Medal (with two campaign stars)
Southwest Asia Service Medal (with two campaign stars)
Humanitarian Service Medal
Service and training awards
Army Service Ribbon
Overseas Service Ribbon (with award numeral 3)
Foreign awards
Canadian Meritorious Service Cross (Military Division)
Kuwait Liberation Medal (Saudi Arabia)
Kuwait Liberation Medal (Kuwait)

Other accoutrements
Combat Infantryman Badge
Expert Infantryman Badge
Master Parachutist Badge
Military Free Fall Parachutist Badge
Special Forces Tab
Ranger Tab
United States Army Special Operations Command Combat Service Identification Badge
Joint Chiefs of Staff Identification Badge
Army Staff Identification Badge
Special Forces Distinctive Unit Insignia
Royal Thai Airborne badge (Golden wings with red backing)

== See also ==
- Project Manager Battle Command

== Sources ==
- Bell, William Gardner (2005). "Peter Jan Schoomaker". Commanding Generals & Chiefs of Staff 1775–2005. Washington, D.C.: United States Army Center of Military History. Archived from the original on 12 December 2007.

Military offices
Preceded by Jack Keane; Acting	Chief of Staff of the United States Army; 2003–2007	Succeeded by George W. Casey Jr.
