= Walter Reed Health Care System =

The Walter Reed Health Care System (WRHCS) is a defunct unit of the United States Army . It was the army's comprehensive and integrated health care delivery system for the National Capital Region. It provides the full range of health care to members of the military and their families as well as members of the federal government. The WRHCS encompasses the Walter Reed Army Medical Center and seven other Army hospitals and health care clinics in Maryland, Pennsylvania, and Virginia.

== Major facilities ==
| Facility | Location |
|---|---|
| Walter Reed Army Medical Center | Washington, D.C. |
| Barquist Army Health Care Facility | Fort Detrick, Maryland |
| Kimbrough Ambulatory Care Center | Fort George G. Meade, Maryland |
| Kirk Army Health Clinic | Aberdeen Proving Ground, Maryland |
| Dunham US Army Health Clinic | Carlisle Barracks, Pennsylvania |
| Fort Belvoir Community Hospital | Fort Belvoir, Virginia |
| DiLorenzo Clinic | The Pentagon |
| Rader Army Health Clinic | Fort Myer, Virginia |

== WRHCS Commanders ==
- BG Patricia D. Horoho, 2007 to 2008
- BG Norvell Coots

== See also ==
- Joint Task Force National Capital Region/Medical
