= Dwight D. Eisenhower Army Medical Center =

Hospital in Georgia, United States

Coordinates: 33°25′48″N 82°07′33″W

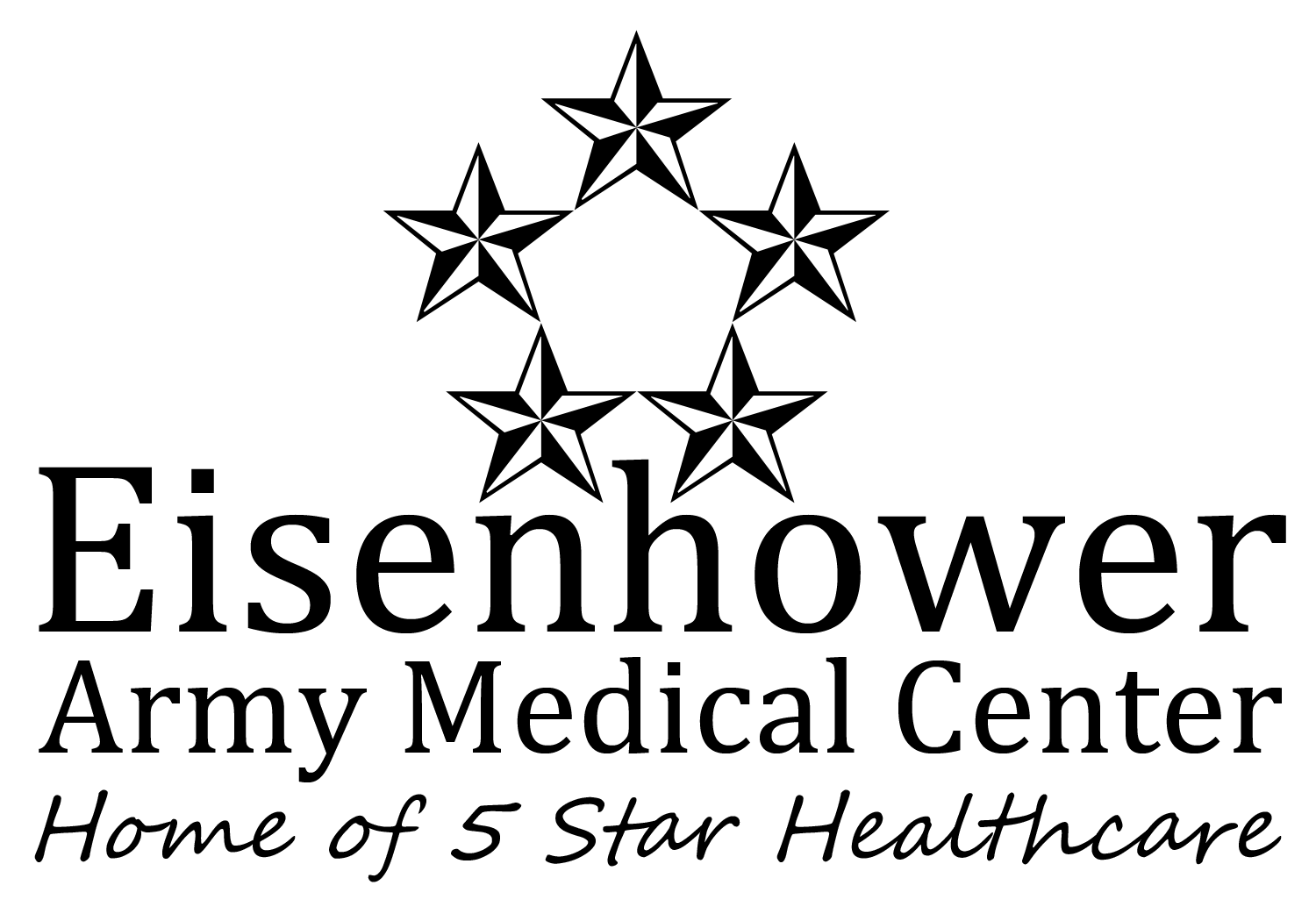
- Active: 1941-present
- Country: United States
- Branch: US Army
- Role: Medical Center
- Garrison/HQ: Fort Gordon, Georgia
- Decorations: Superior Unit Award
- Website: https://eisenhower.tricare.mil/

Commanders
- Current commander: COL Rose L. Freeman

Insignia
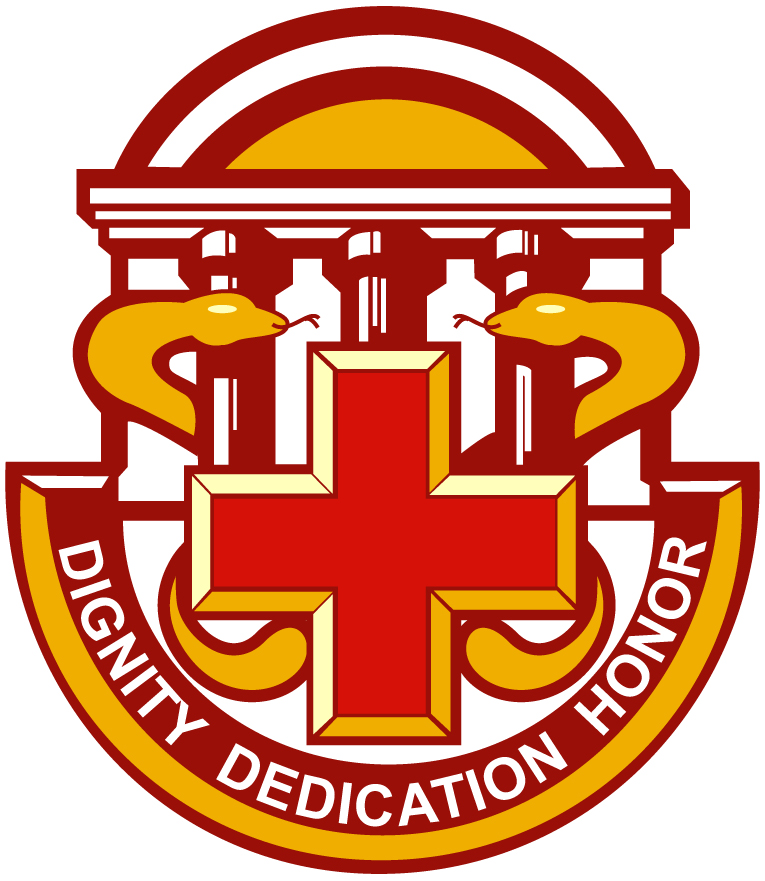
- DUI

The Dwight D. Eisenhower Army Medical Center (EAMC) is a 93-bed medical treatment facility located on Fort Gordon, located

near Augusta, Georgia that previously served as the headquarters of the Army's Southeast Regional Medical Command (SERMC). SERMC oversaw the Army's hospitals and clinics within the southeastern United States and Puerto Rico. SERMC was renamed Southern Regional Medical Command (SRMC) and was relocated to San Antonio in 2009.

== History ==
The hospital started as Camp Gordon Station Hospital in 1941, caring for World War II casualties and dependents. It was closed in 1946, but reopened as Camp Gordon became the more permanent Fort Gordon during the Cold War. The hospital's current building, opened for patients in 1976, replaced sprawling wooden buildings from the World War II era. During the building's dedication a year prior its opening, it was dedicated in honor of former General of the U.S. Army and President Dwight D. Eisenhower, who made his farewell address to the Army at Fort Gordon in 1961. During one visit in 1965, he suffered a heart attack and was treated in a large private suite in the old hospital for two weeks before being sent to Walter Reed in Washington by train. Later in 1975, former First Lady Mamie Eisenhower, was treated at Ft. Gordon for internal bleeding.

== Current-day activities ==
Active-duty personnel and their TRICARE beneficiaries use the medical center and clinics for their primary health care. Numerous military retirees in the Augusta area use the medical center's pharmacy and facilities. EAMC is involved in the growing field of disaster medicine and hosts disaster-drill training events on Fort Eisenhower involving the civilian medical community and the local region of the Federal Emergency Management Agency. The hospital is a training hospital for military doctors, and partners with the Medical College of Georgia and Augusta Veterans Affairs Medical Center in training programs and patient care. For example, TRICARE dependents in need of obstetrics services are sent to Piedmont Augusta, while the Augusta VA runs a spinal-cord rehabilitation unit and an active duty rehabilitation unit, which has hosted many veterans of Operation Iraqi Freedom. In return, civilian, non-TRICARE dependent patients are often sent to Eisenhower for use of its hyperbaric chamber.

== DoD/VA Sharing Agreements ==
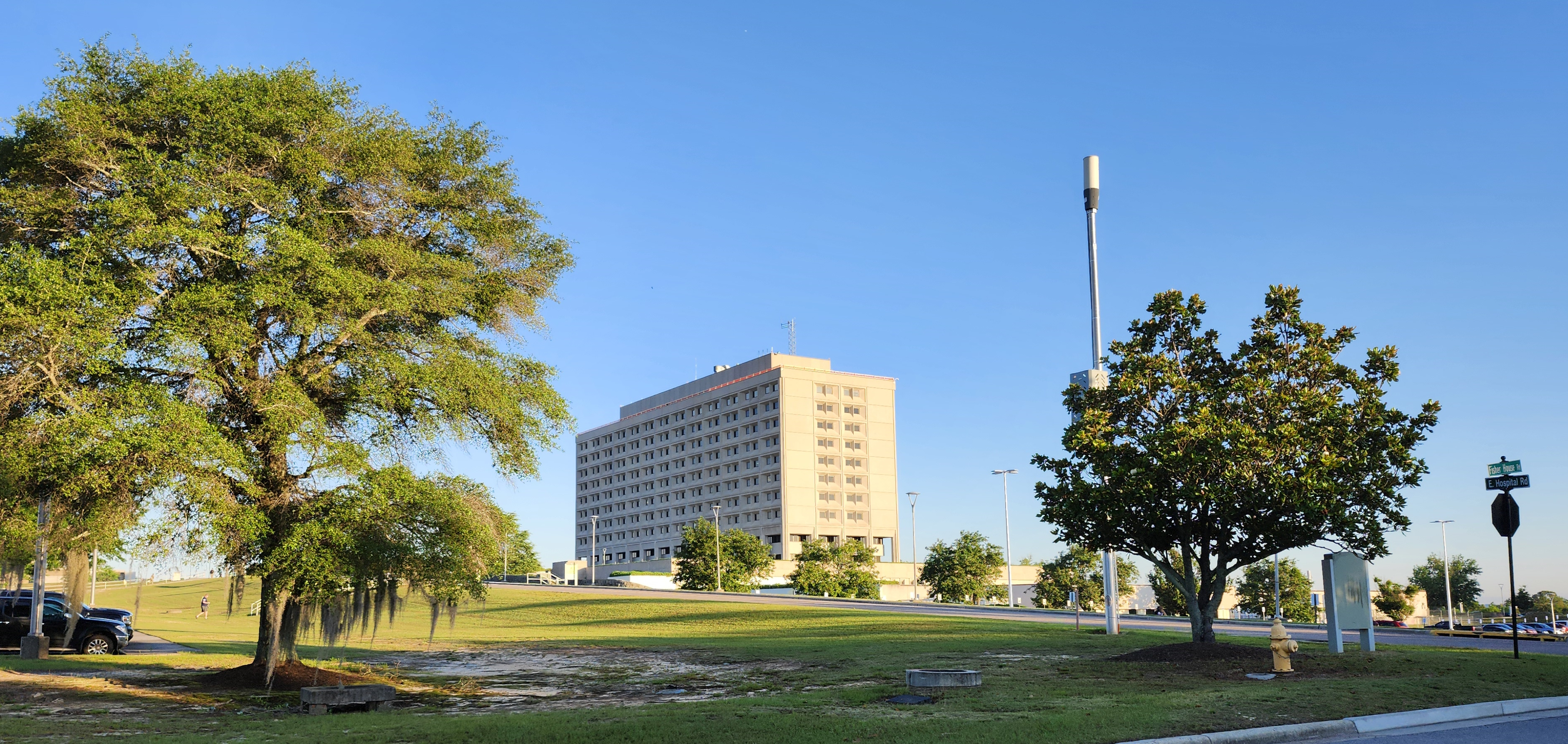
Eisenhower Army Medical Center campus from Fisher House Road.

EAMC has DoD/VA sharing agreements with the Veterans Affairs Medical Centers in Augusta, Ga., Dublin, Ga., and Columbia, S.C., and network agreements with other hospitals and medical centers in the Augusta area. The relationships have infused millions of dollars into the Augusta community, as well as provided veterans, beneficiaries and family members with access to the care and procedures. There are two hyberbaric chambers at Doctors Hospital in Augusta, Georgia.

== Residential Treatment Facility ==
The 30-bed Residential Treatment Facility is an American Society of Addiction Medicine Level III facility and the second RTF facility in the DoD and the only facility in the Southern Region Medical Command. ASAM Level III Programs are the highest level of multidisciplinary treatment programs and provide care to the full spectrum of patients with alcohol and substance dependence disorders combined with conditions such as PTSD, depression, and mild traumatic brain injury.
