= Order of Military Medical Merit =

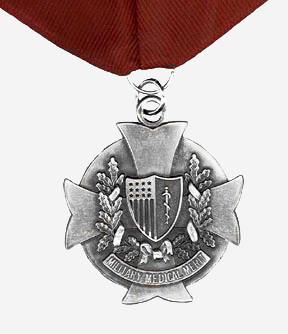
The Order of Military Medical Merit Medallion

The Order of Military Medical Merit (02M3) is a private organization that was founded by the Commanding General of the U.S. Army Health Services Command in 1982 with the goal of recognizing excellence and promoting fellowship and esprit de corps among Army Medical Department (AMEDD) personnel. Medical personnel from all branches of the United States military are eligible for the award. Membership in the Order denotes distinguished service which is recognized by the senior leadership of the AMEDD, and is signified with the presentation of a white brass or sterling silver medallion on a maroon ribbon.

== Notable recipients ==
- Patricia Horoho
- Geoffrey Ling
- Kevin O'Connor
- William C. Patrick III
- Eric Schoomaker
- Vic Snyder
- Loree K. Sutton
- James A. Zimble
