= USAMU =

The acronym USAMU may mean:

- United States Army Marksmanship Unit, a unit established in 1956 at Fort Benning, Georgia to raise marksmanship standards throughout the U.S. Army
- United States Army Medical Unit (1956-69), a now defunct medical research unit for biodefense at Fort Detrick, Maryland. It was predecessor to today's USAMRIID.
