= United States biological defense program =

Government effort to counter biological threats

The United States biological defense program—in recent years also called the National Biodefense Strategy—refers to the collective effort by all levels of government, along with private enterprise and other stakeholders, in the United States to carry out biodefense activities.

Biodefense is a system of planned actions to counter and reduce the risk of biological threats and to prepare, respond to, and recover from them if they happen. The National Defense Authorization Act (NDAA) of 2016 required high-level officials across the federal government to create a national biodefense strategy together. As a result, in 2018 the National Biodefense Strategy was released by President Donald Trump. In essence, the strategy comprises the U.S. biological defense program in that it is the official framework that provides a "single coordinated effort" to coordinate all biodefense activities across the federal government. To execute the strategy, the White House issued a Presidential Memorandum on the Support for National Biodefense, which puts the specific directives and rules in place for carrying out the plans written in the strategy. The National Biodefense Strategy elevated natural outbreaks as a vital component of the U.S. biological defense program for the first time, mostly because of the significant risk that natural outbreaks pose to civilian, animal and agricultural populations across the country.

The U.S. Biological Defense Program began as a small defensive effort that parallels the country's offensive biological weapons development and production program, active since 1943. Organizationally, the medical defense research effort was pursued first (1956–1969) by the U.S. Army Medical Unit (USAMU) and later, after publicly known discontinuation of the offensive program, by the U.S. Army Medical Research Institute of Infectious Diseases (USAMRIID). Both of these units were located at Fort Detrick, Maryland, where the U.S. Army Biological Warfare Laboratories were headquartered. The current mission is multi-agency, not exclusively military, and is purely to develop defensive measures against bio-agents, as opposed to the former bio-weapons development program.

In 1951, due to biological warfare concerns arising from the Korean War, the US Centers for Disease Control and Prevention (CDC) created the Epidemic Intelligence Service (EIS), a hands-on two-year postgraduate training program in epidemiology, with a focus on field work.

Since the 2001 anthrax attacks, and the consequent expansion of federal bio-defense expenditures, USAMRIID has been joined at Fort Detrick by sister bio-defense agencies of the U.S. Department of Health and Human Services (NIAID's Integrated Research Facility) and the U.S. Department of Homeland Security (the National Biodefense Analysis and Countermeasures Center and the National Bioforensic Analysis Center). These—along with the much older Foreign Disease Weed Science Research Unit of the U.S. Department of Agriculture—now constitute the National Interagency Confederation for Biological Research (NICBR).

Broadly defined, the "United States Biological Defense Program" now also encompasses all federal-level programs and efforts to monitor, prevent, and contain naturally occurring infectious disease outbreaks of widespread public health concern. These include efforts to forestall large-scale disasters such as flu pandemics and other "emerging infections" such as novel pathogens or those imported from other countries.

== Overview ==
Biological agents have been used in warfare for centuries to produce death or disease in humans, animals, or plants. The United States officially began its biological warfare offensive program in 1941. During the next 28 years, the U.S. initiative evolved into an effective, military-driven research and acquisition program, shrouded in secrecy and, later, controversy. Most research and development was done at Fort Detrick, Maryland, while production and testing of bio-weapons occurred at Pine Bluff, Arkansas, and Dugway Proving Ground (DPG), Utah. Field testing was done secretly and successfully with simulants and actual agents disseminated over wide areas. A small defensive effort always paralleled the weapons development and production program. With the presidential decision in 1969 to halt offensive biological weapons production—and the agreement in 1972 at the international BWC never to develop, produce, stockpile, or retain biological agents or toxins—the program became entirely defensive, with medical and non-medical components. The U.S. biological defense research program exists today, conducting research to develop physical and medical countermeasures to protect service members and civilians from the threat of modern biological warfare.

Both the U.S. bio-weapons ban and the BWC restricted any work in the area of biological warfare to defensive in nature. In reality, this gives BWC member-states wide latitude to conduct biological weapons research because the BWC contains no provisions for monitoring of enforcement. The treaty, essentially, is a gentlemen's agreement amongst members backed by the long-prevailing thought that biological warfare should not be used in battle.

In recent years certain critics have claimed the U.S. stance on biological warfare and the use of biological agents has differed from historical interpretations of the BWC. For example, it is said that the U.S. now maintains that the Article I of the BWC (which explicitly bans bio-weapons), does not apply to "non-lethal" biological agents. Previous interpretation was stated to be in line with a definition laid out in Public Law 101–298, the Biological Weapons Anti-Terrorism Act of 1989. That law defined a biological agent as:

any micro-organism, virus, infectious substance, or biological product that may be engineered as a result of biotechnology, or any naturally occurring or bio-engineered component of any such microorganism, virus, infectious substance, or biological product, capable of causing death, disease, or other biological malfunction in a human, an animal, a plant, or another living organism; deterioration of food, water, equipment, supplies, or material of any kind ...

According to the Federation of American Scientists, U.S. work on non-lethal agents exceeds limitations in the BWC.

== History ==
=== 1950s ===
After World War II, and with the onset of Cold War tensions, the US continued its clandestine wartime bio-weapons program. The Korean War (1950–1953) added justification for continuing the program, when the possible entry of the Soviet Union into the war was feared. Concerns over the Soviet Union were perceived as justified, for the Soviet Union would pronounce in 1956 that they would use chemical and biological weapons for mass destruction in future wars. In October 1950, the US Secretary of Defense approved continuation of the program, based largely on the Soviet threat and a belief that the North Korean and Chinese governments would use biological weapons. With expansion of the biological warfare retaliatory program, the scope of the defensive program was nearly doubled. Data were obtained on personnel protection, decontamination, and immunization. Early detection research produced prototype alarms for use on the battlefield, but progress was slow, apparently limited by technology.

The U.S. Army Medical Unit, under the direction of The U.S. Army Surgeon General, began formal operations in 1956. One of the Unit's first missions was to manage all aspects of Project CD-22, the exposure of volunteers to aerosols containing a pathogenic strain of Coxiella burnetii, the etiologic agent of Q fever. The volunteers were closely monitored and antibiotic therapy was administered when appropriate. All volunteers recovered from Q fever with no adverse aftereffects. One year later, the Unit submitted to the U.S. Food and Drug Administration an Investigational New Drug application for a Q fever vaccine.

=== 1960s ===
In the following decade, the US accumulated significant data on personnel protection, decontamination, and immunization; and, in the offensive program, on the potential for mosquitoes to be used as biological vectors. A new Department of Defense (DoD) Biological and Chemical Defense Planning Board was created in 1960 to establish program priorities and objectives. Preventive approaches toward infections of all kinds were funded under the auspices of biological warfare. As concern increased over the biological warfare threat during the Cold War, so did the budget for the program: to $38 million by fiscal year 1966.

The U.S. Army Chemical Corps was given the responsibility to conduct biological warfare research for all of the services. In 1962, the responsibility for the testing of promising biological warfare agents was given to a separate U.S. Army Test and Evaluation Command (USATECOM). Depending on the particular program, different test centers were used, such as the Deseret Test Center at Fort Douglas, Utah, the headquarters for the new biological and chemical warfare testing organization. In response to increasing concerns over public safety and the environment, the USATECOM implemented a complex system of approval of its research programs that included the U.S. Army Chief of Staff, the Joint Chiefs of Staff, the Secretary of Defense, and the President of the United States.

During the last 10 years of the offensive research and development program (1959–69), many scientific advances were made that proved that biological warfare was clearly feasible, although dependent on careful planning, especially with regard to meteorological conditions. Large-scale fermentation, purification, concentration, stabilization, drying, and weaponization of pathogenic microorganisms could be done safely. Furthermore, modern principles of biosafety and containment were established at the Fort Detrick laboratories which have greatly facilitated biomedical research in general; still today, these are followed throughout the world. Arnold G. Wedum, M.D., Ph.D., a civilian scientist who was Director of Industrial Health and Safety at Fort Detrick, was the leader in the development of containment facilities.

During the 1960s, the US program underwent a philosophical change, and attention was now directed more towards biological agents that could incapacitate, but not kill. In 1964, research programs involved staphylococcal enterotoxins capable of causing food poisoning. Research initiatives also included new therapy and prophylaxis. Pathogens studied included the agents causing anthrax, glanders, brucellosis, melioidosis, plague, psittacosis, Venezuelan equine encephalitis, Q fever, coccidioidomycosis, and a variety of plant and animal pathogens

Particular attention was directed at chemical and biological detectors during the 1960s. The first devices were primitive field alarms to detect chemicals. Although the development of sensitive biological warfare agent detectors was at a standstill, two systems were, nonetheless, investigated. The first was a monitor that detected increases in the number of particles sized 1 to 5 μm in diameter, based on the assumption that a biological agent attack would include airborne particles of this size. The second system involved the selective staining of particles collected from the air. Both systems lacked enough specificity and sensitivity to be of any practical use.

But in 1966, a research effort directed at detecting the presence of adenosine triphosphate (a chemical found only in living organisms) was begun. By using a fluorescent material found in fireflies, preliminary studies indicated that it was possible to detect the presence of a biological agent in the atmosphere. The important effort to find a satisfactory detection system continues today, for timely detection of a biological attack would allow the attacked force to use its protective masks effectively, and identification of the agent would allow any pre-treatment regimens to be instituted. The US Army also experimented with and developed highly effective barrier protective measures against both chemical and biological agents. Special impervious tents and personal protective equipment were developed, including individual gas masks even for military dogs.

During the late 1960s, funding for the biological warfare program decreased temporarily, to accommodate the accelerating costs of the Vietnam War. The budget for fiscal year 1969 was $31 million, decreasing to $11.8 million by fiscal year 1973. Although the offensive program had been stopped in 1969, both offensive and defensive programs continued to be defended. John S. Foster, Jr, Director of Defense Research and Engineering, responded to a query by Congressman Richard D. McCarthy:

It is the policy of the U.S. to develop and maintain a defensive chemical-biological (CB) capability so that our military forces could operate for some period of time in a toxic environment, if necessary; to develop and maintain a limited offensive capability in order to deter all use of CB weapons by the threat of retaliation in kind; and to continue a program of research and development in this area to minimize the possibility of technological surprise.

On 25 November 1969, President Richard Nixon visited Fort Detrick to announce a new policy on biological warfare. In two National Security Memoranda, the U.S. government renounced all development, production, and stockpiling of biological weapons and declared its intent to maintain only small research quantities of biological agents, such as are necessary for the development of vaccines, drugs, and diagnostics.

Ground was broken in 1967 for the construction of a new, modern laboratory building at Fort Detrick. The building would open in phases during 1971 and 1972. With the disestablishment of the biological warfare laboratories, the name of the U.S. Army Medical Unit, which was to have been housed in the new laboratories, was formally changed to U.S. Army Medical Research Institute of Infectious Diseases (USAMRIID) in 1969. The institute's new mission was stated in General Order 137, 10 November 1971 (since superseded):

Conducts studies related to medical defensive aspects of biological agents of military importance and develops appropriate biological protective measures, diagnostic procedures and therapeutic methods.

The emphasis now shifted away from offensive weapons to the development of vaccines, diagnostic systems, personal protection, chemoprophylaxis, and rapid detection systems.

=== 1970s ===
After Nixon declared an end to the U.S. bio-weapons program, debate in the Army centered around whether or not toxin weapons were included in the president's declaration. Following Nixon's November 1969 order, scientists at Fort Detrick worked on one toxin, Staphylococcus enterotoxin type B (SEB), for several more months. Nixon ended the debate when he added toxins to the bio-weapons ban in February 1970.

In response to Nixon's 1969 decision, all antipersonnel biological warfare stocks were destroyed between 10 May 1971 and 1 May 1972. The laboratory at Pine Bluff Arsenal, Arkansas, was converted to a toxicological research laboratory, and was no longer under the direction or control of the DoD. Biological anticrop agents were destroyed by February 1973. Biological warfare demilitarization continued through the 1970s, with input provided by the U.S. Department of Health, Education and Welfare; U.S. Department of the Interior; U.S. Department of Agriculture; and the Environmental Protection Agency. Fort Detrick and other installations involved in the biological warfare program took on new identities, and their missions were changed to biological defense and the development of medical countermeasures. The necessary containment capability, Biosafety Levels 3 and 4 (BSL-3 and BSL-4) continued to be maintained at USAMRIID.

=== 1980s ===
In 1984, the DoD requested funds for the construction of another biological aerosol test facility in Utah. The proposal submitted by the army called for BSL-4 containment, although maintaining that the BSL-4 inclusion was based on a possible need in the future and not on a current research effort. The proposal was not well received in Utah, where many citizens and government officials still recalled the secretive projects of the military: the areas on DPG still contaminated with anthrax spores, and the well-publicized accidental chemical poisoning of a flock of sheep in Skull Valley, Utah, in March 1968. Questions arose over the safety of the employees and the surrounding communities, and a suggestion was even made to shift all biological defense research to a civilian agency, such as the National Institutes of Health. The plan for a new facility was revised to utilize a BSL-3 facility, but not before the US Congress had instituted more surveillance, reporting, and control measures on the army to ensure compliance with the BWC.

=== 1990s ===
In the 1990s, the US medical biological defense research effort (part of the U.S. Army's Biological Defense Research Program [BDRP]) was concentrated at USAMRIID at Fort Detrick. The army maintained state-of-the-art containment laboratory facilities there, with more than 10,000 ft2 of BSL-4 and 50,000 ft2 of BSL-3 laboratory space. BSL-4, the highest containment level, included laboratory suites that are isolated by internal walls and protected by rigorous entry restrictions, air-locks, negative-pressure air-handling systems, and filtration of all out-flow air through high-efficiency particulate air (HEPA) filters. Workers in BSL-4 laboratories also wore filtered positive-pressure total body suits, which isolated the workers from the internal air of the laboratory. BSL-3 laboratories had a similar design, but do not require that personnel wear positive-pressure suits. Workers in BSL-3 suites were protected immunologically by vaccines. U.S. governmental standards provided guidance as to which organisms might be handled under various containment levels in laboratories such as USAMRIID.

The unique facilities available at USAMRIID also included a 16-bed clinical research ward capable of BSL-3 containment, and a 2-bed patient care isolation suite—the Medical Containment Suite (MCS), known as "The Slammer"—where ICU-level care could be provided under BSL-4 containment. Here, healthcare personnel wore the same positive-pressure suits as are worn in BSL-4 research laboratories. The level of patient isolation required depended on the infecting organism and the risk to healthcare providers. Patient care can be provided at BSL-4. There were no patient-care category analogous to BSL-3; humans who are ill as a result of exposure to BSL-3 agents were to be cared for in an ordinary hospital room with barrier nursing procedures.

USAMRIID guidelines were prepared to determine which level of containment would be employed for individual patients who required BSL-4 isolation or barrier nursing care. Staff augmentation for BSL-4 critical care expertise came from the Walter Reed Army Medical Center (WRAMC), Washington, D.C., in accordance with a memorandum of agreement between the two institutions. Patients could be brought directly into the BSL-4 suite from the outside through specialized ports with unique patient-isolation equipment. (The MCS was decommissioned and discontinued in December 2010.)

Additionally, starting in the 1970s USAMRIID maintained a unique evacuation capability known as the Aeromedical Isolation Team (AIT). Led by a physician and a registered nurse, each of the two teams consisted of eight volunteers who trained intensively to provide an evacuation capability for casualties suspected of being infected with highly transmissible, life-threatening BSL-4 infectious diseases (e.g., hemorrhagic fever viruses). The unit used special adult-sized Vickers isolation units (Vickers Medical Containment Stretcher Transit Isolator). These units were aircraft transportable and isolated a patient placed inside from the external environment. The AIT could transport two patients simultaneously; obviously, this was not designed for a mass casualty situation. During the 1995 outbreak of Ebola fever in Zaire, the AIT remained on alert to evacuate any US citizens who might have become ill while working to control the disease in that country.

During this period, some biological defense research also continued at the U.S. Army Medical Research Institute of Chemical Defense, Edgewood Arsenal, Maryland, and the Walter Reed Army Institute of Research (WRAIR), Washington, D.C. USAMRIID and these sister laboratories conducted basic research in support of the medical component of the US biological defense research program, which developed strategies, products, information, procedures, and training for medical defense against biological warfare agents. The products included diagnostic reagents and procedures, drugs, vaccines, toxoids, and antitoxins. Emphasis is placed on protecting personnel before any potential exposure to the biological agent occurs.

In 1997, United States law formally defined weaponizable bio-agents as "Biological Select Agents or Toxins" (BSATs) — or simply Select Agents for short — which fall under the oversight of either the U.S. Department of Health and Human Services or the U.S. Department of Agriculture (or both) and which have the "potential to pose a severe threat to public health and safety".

In 1998, several DoD organizations consolidated to create the Defense Threat Reduction Agency (DTRA), headquartered in Fort Belvoir, Virginia. This agency is DOD's official Combat Support Agency for countering weapons of mass destruction, including bio-agents. DTRA's main functions are threat reduction, threat control, combat support, and technology development. In the US national interest, DTRA supports projects at more than 14 locations around the world, including Russia, Kazakhstan, Azerbaijan, Uzbekistan, Georgia, and Ukraine.

In 1999, a "National Pharmaceutical Stockpile" — renamed Strategic National Stockpile in 2002 — was created under the oversight of DHHS. In the same year, the Laboratory Response Network — a collaborative effort within the US federal government involving the Association of Public Health Laboratories and the Centers for Disease Control and Prevention — was established to facilitate the confirmatory diagnosis and typing of possible bio-agents. Also in 1999, President Bill Clinton issued Executive Order 13139, which provided for experimental anti-WMD drugs to be given to service members at the discretion of the Secretary of Defense only under informed consent; only the President may waive the necessity for informed consent.

=== 2000s ===
Three secret DoD projects involving countermeasures against anthrax – code named Project Bacchus, Project Clear Vision and Project Jefferson – were publicly disclosed by The New York Times in 2001. (The projects were undertaken between 1997 and 2000 and focused on the concern that the old Soviet BW program was secretly continuing and had developed a genetically modified anthrax weapon.)

Since the September 11 attacks and the 2001 anthrax attacks, the US government has allocated nearly $50 billion to address the threat of biological weapons. Funding for bioweapons-related activities focuses primarily on research for and acquisition of medicines for defense. Biodefense funding also goes toward stockpiling protective equipment, increased surveillance and detection of bio-agents, and improving state and hospital preparedness. Significant funding goes to BARDA (Biomedical Advanced Research and Development Authority), part of DHHS. Funding for activities aimed at prevention has more than doubled since 2007 and is distributed among 11 federal agencies. Efforts toward cooperative international action are part of the project.

A "Select Agent Program" (SAP) was established to satisfy requirements of the USA PATRIOT Act of 2001 and the Public Health Security and Bioterrorism Preparedness and Response Act of 2002. The Centers for Disease Control and Prevention administers the SAP, which regulates the laboratories that may possess, use, or transfer Select Agents within the United States. The Project Bioshield Act was passed by Congress in 2004 calling for $5 billion for purchasing vaccines that would be used in the event of a bioterrorist attack. According to President George W. Bush:

Project BioShield will transform our ability to defend the nation in three essential ways. First, Project BioShield authorizes $5.6 billion over 10 years for the government to purchase and stockpile vaccines and drugs to fight anthrax, smallpox and other potential agents of bioterror. The DHHS has already taken steps to purchase 75 million doses of an improved anthrax vaccine for the Strategic National Stockpile. Under Project BioShield, HHS is moving forward with plans to acquire a safer, second generation smallpox vaccine, an antidote to botulinum toxin, and better treatments for exposure to chemical and radiological weapons.

This was a ten-year program to acquire medical countermeasures to biological, chemical, radiological and nuclear agents for civilian use. A key element of the Act was to allow stockpiling and distribution of vaccines that had not been tested for safety or efficacy in humans, due to ethical concerns. Efficacy of these agents cannot be directly tested in humans without also exposing humans to the chemical, biological, or radioactive threat being treated. In these cases efficacy testing follows the US Food and Drug Administration Animal Rule for pivotal animal efficacy.

Since 2007, USAMRIID has been joined at Fort Detrick by sister bio-defense agencies of the U.S. Department of Health and Human Services (NIAID's Integrated Research Facility) and the U.S. Department of Homeland Security (the National Biodefense Analysis and Countermeasures Center (NBACC) and the National Bioforensic Analysis Center). These—along with the much older Foreign Disease Weed Science Research Unit of the U.S. Department of Agriculture—now constitute the National Interagency Confederation for Biological Research (NICBR).

The expansion of U.S. biodefense programs in the 2000s, particularly through NBACC, raised concerns among some arms control experts regarding compliance with the Biological Weapons Convention. A 2003 commentary in Politics and the Life Sciences by Milton Leitenberg, James F. Leonard, and Richard Spertzel argued that some NBACC activities—including genetic engineering of pathogens, pathogen dispersal modeling, and “Red Teaming” (simulating biothreat scenarios)—could be perceived as offensive biological weapons research rather than purely defensive work. The authors warned that research into pathogen stabilization, packaging, and dispersal resembled previous U.S. offensive biological weapons programs before the BWC came into effect. A 2004 report in The Journal of Clinical Investigation raised similar concerns, citing a presentation by Lieutenant Colonel George W. Korch Jr., which outlined NBACC research objectives such as acquiring, growing, modifying, storing, stabilizing, packaging, and dispersing biological agents. Experts noted that several of these tasks were categorized by the National Academy of Sciences as "experiments of concern", particularly those that might increase pathogen virulence, transmissibility, or resistance to countermeasures. Leitenberg warned that high-fidelity modeling and feasibility studies of biological threats might have already "crossed the line" into offensive research. He also suggested that U.S. biodefense activities could provoke other nations to expand their own biological weapons research, increasing global security risks.

Anthony Fauci, then Director of the U.S. National Institute of Allergy and Infectious Diseases, stated that NBACC’s work focused on developing diagnostics, therapeutics, and vaccines, dismissing comparisons to past offensive bioweapons programs. Gerald Parker, then Director of the U.S. Department of Homeland Security Office of Science-Based Threat Analysis, also denied any intent to enhance pathogen virulence but acknowledged that if intelligence suggested adversaries were modifying pathogens, NBACC "may have to evaluate the technical feasibility" of such modifications.

Peter Gilligan of the University of North Carolina Medical School criticized efforts to enhance virulence or antibiotic resistance in pathogens, citing risks of accidental release, proliferation, and misuse. Gilligan pointed to the 1979 Sverdlovsk anthrax leak as an example of how even defensive biological research can lead to deadly accidents. He also questioned the financial and ethical costs of the biodefense expansion, arguing that billions of dollars were being spent on speculative countermeasures while other pressing global health needs, like countering the spread of HIV in developing countries, remained underfunded.

=== 2010s ===
In July 2012, the White House issued its guiding document on the National Biosurveillance Strategy.

=== 2020s ===
In December 2019, Congress moved forward with a spending package that provided increases for several key U.S. biological defense programs, including the Strategic National Stockpile. The Centers for Disease Control and Prevention was slated to receive $8 billion, a $636 million increase over 2019, with a mandate written in the bill for CDC "to maintain a strong and central role in the medical countermeasures enterprise." Within the CDC budget, the Public Health and Social Services Emergency Fund, which prepares for "all public health emergencies" including bioterrorism and federal efforts against infectious diseases, was funded at $2.74 billion. Another change was a specific item in the budget for the Strategic National Stockpile, which directed $535 million for vaccines, medicines and diagnostic tools to fight Ebola, which has become an emerging threat.

== Current status ==
In August 2019, the U.S. Government Accountability Office (GAO) issued a report that identified specific challenges that the United States faces in protecting the nation against biological events. The report focused on four specific vulnerabilities: assessment of "enterprise-wide threats", situational awareness and data integration, biodetection technologies, and lab safety and security.

Products currently being produced or under development through military research include:

- Vaccines to prevent tularemia, Q fever, Rift Valley fever, Venezuelan equine encephalitis, Eastern and Western equine encephalitis, chikungunya fever, Argentine hemorrhagic fever, the botulinum toxicoses, and anthrax;
- Antitoxins for diseases such as botulism;
- Human immune globulin preparations (passive antibody protection) against various bacteria and viruses; and
- Antiviral drugs against multiple viral agents.

Some vaccines also have applicability for diseases of domestic animals (e.g., Rift Valley fever and Venezuelan equine encephalitis). In addition, vaccines are provided to persons who may be occupationally exposed to such agents (e.g., laboratory workers, entomologists, and veterinary personnel) throughout government, industry, and academe.

USAMRIID also provides diagnostic and epidemiological support to federal, state, and local agencies and foreign governments. Examples of assistance rendered to civilian health efforts by the U.S. Army Medical Research and Materiel Command (USAMRMC) include:

- The massive immunization program instituted during the Venezuelan equine encephalitis outbreak in the Americas in 1971;
- The laboratory support provided to the U.S. Public Health Service during the outbreak of Legionnaire's disease in Philadelphia, Pennsylvania, in 1976;
- The management of patients suspected of having African viral hemorrhagic fever in Sweden during the 1980s;
- International support during the outbreak of Rift Valley fever in Mauritania in 1989;
- Assistance with the outbreak of Ebola infections among monkeys imported to Reston (Virginia) in 1990 (→ Reston virus); and
- Epidemiological and diagnostic support to the World Health Organization–Centers for Disease Control and Prevention field team that studied the Ebola outbreak in Zaire in 1995 (→ Zaire ebolavirus).

The current research effort combines new technological advances, such as genetic engineering and molecular modeling, applying them toward development of prevention and treatment of diseases of military significance. The program is conducted in compliance with requirements set forth by the U.S. Food and Drug Administration (FDA), U.S. Public Health Service, Nuclear Regulatory Commission, U.S. Department of Agriculture, Occupational Safety and Health Administration, and Biological Weapons Convention.
