= William C. Patrick III =

American microbiologist

William C. Patrick III (July 24, 1926 – October 1, 2010) was an influential microbiologist and bioweaponeer for the U.S. Army during the Cold War.

Patrick headed the American offensive biological warfare (BW) program at Fort Detrick, MD beginning in 1951. After biological weapons development was discontinued by President Richard Nixon in 1969, and the bioweapons were decommissioned in 1971–72, he continued to work at Fort Detrick on biowarfare defense projects until 1986.

== Biography ==
=== Youth and education ===
Patrick was born in Ridgeland, South Carolina in 1926. He served in the U.S. Army during World War II and then attended and graduated (1948) from the University of South Carolina. In 1949 he received a master's degree (microbiology and biochemistry) from the University of Tennessee.

=== Career ===
Patrick began his professional career at the research division of Commercial Solvents in Terre Haute, Indiana.

==== The U.S. offensive BW program ====
From 1951 to 1966, Patrick was employed in a variety of offensive programs which included 1) Project engineer in the design and start-up operations in the virus production facility as well as the freeze drying plant at Pine Bluff Arsenal (PBA), Arkansas; 2) Plant manager of the virus pilot plant at Fort Detrick, Maryland; 3) Special envoy to Dugway Proving Ground (DPG), Utah, during the field testing of several munitions systems; and 4) Chief of Agent Processing Branch, Pilot Plant Division, Biological Warfare Laboratories (BWL) for several years.

===== Role of the Product Development Division =====
Patrick became Chief of Product Development Division (PDD) of the former BWL in 1965. This division was responsible for the first steps in the weaponization of an agent. He held this position until 1972 when the offensive program was disestablished. Products were developed with those desired or required biological, physical, aerobiological, and storage characteristics for employment in specific prototype munitions. Patrick worked closely with the basic research scientists, the bio-investigators and engineers in the pilot plant (see Building 470) and in the production plant at PBA, as well as with munitions development engineers. Frequently, the unique products of the Division were the first to be tested in field tests at DPG, and at other field sites. Product development covered all agents and included bacteria, viruses, fungi, rickettsiae and toxins. Mathematical modeling was performed in relation to target analysis and target requirements constituted a fundamental objective in the product development cycle.

==== The U.S. defensive BW program ====
Patrick joined the new U.S. Army Medical Research Institute of Infectious Diseases (USAMRIID) in 1972 and served as its Plans and Programs Officer until 1984, reporting directly to the commander. He participated in the planning, directing, coordinating, evaluating and reporting on a broad, complex program of medical defense against bio-agents. In 1984, he was promoted to one of the most senior civilian positions at USAMRIID as Program Analysis Officer, a position he held until his retirement in 1986.

==== In retirement ====
After leaving his government job, Patrick was a consultant to the U. S. Government and private organizations. He performed services on a contractual basis to Defense Intelligence Agency, Armed Forces Medical Intelligence Center, Central Intelligence Agency, USAMRIID, Federal Bureau of Investigation, United States Secret Service, and many other institutions through his own firm, Biothreats Assessment. These services include 1) lectures on agent-munitions weaponization, agent characteristics, aerosol technologies, etc.; 2) mathematical modeling of agents to illustrate target coverage; 3) biodefensive and biosafety lectures; 4) analytical studies of agents and their potential; and 5) lectures on bioterrorism.

Patrick's BW experience provided significant insights into Iraq's BW program. On the UNSCOM 78 trip to Iraq (1994), his observations on how process equipment was being used at the Al Hakum facility provided the nearest thing to a "smoking gun" for Iraqi intent until they themselves declared an extensive BW program in 1995. He then continued to present lectures on the History of Biological Warfare; Bio-Agents; Munition Weaponization; Aerosol Technology; Agent Modeling; Biosafety; Biodefense; and BW Terrorism. He appeared on all of the major U.S. television networks as well as the Canadian Broadcasting Corporation, the BBC, PBS, the History Channel, The Learning Channel, and the Discovery Channel. In his last years, Patrick gave numerous guest lectures at venues such as the National War College, Army War College, Air War College, MIT, Centers for Disease Control and Prevention and the National Academy of Sciences.

Patrick married his second wife, Virginia, in July 1972. He had two sons from his first marriage and two stepchildren. He died from bladder cancer on 1 October 2010.

== Works ==
Patrick held five U.S. patents pertaining to biological processes and equipment, and authored 16 articles in scientific journals, as well as 98 in-house Department of the Army publications.

- Patrick, William C. (1994), "Biological Warfare: An Overview" In: Director's Series on Proliferation, Livermore, California: Lawrence Livermore National Laboratory.
- Patrick, William C. (2001), The Threat of Biological Warfare, for the Washington Roundtable on Science and Public Policy, Washington DC.
- Sidell, Frederick and William Patrick, Thomas Dashiell, Ken Alibek, Scott Layne, Jane's Chem-Bio Handbook (2005), Second Edition, Jane's Information Group.

== Awards ==
- Six U.S. Army Sustained Superior Performance awards (1954, 1958, 1962, 1968, 1977 and 1980).
- Special Service Award, 1982
- Order of Military Medical Merit, 1986
