= Biodefense =

Measures to restore biosecurity to a group of organisms

Biodefense refers to measures to counter biological threats, reduce biological risks, and prepare for, respond to, and recover from bioincidents, whether naturally occurring, accidental, or deliberate in origin and whether impacting human, animal, plant, or environmental health. Biodefense measures often aim to improve biosecurity or biosafety. Biodefense is frequently discussed in the context of biological warfare or bioterrorism, and is generally considered a military or emergency response term.

Biodefense applies to two distinct target populations: civilian non-combatants and military combatants (troops in the field). Protection of water supplies and food supplies are often a critical part of biodefense.

== Military ==
=== Troops in the field ===
Military biodefense in the United States began with the United States Army Medical Unit (USAMU) at Fort Detrick, Maryland, in 1956. (In contrast to the U.S. Army Biological Warfare Laboratories [1943–1969], also at Fort Detrick, the USAMU's mission was purely to develop defensive measures against bio-agents, as opposed to weapons development.) The USAMU was disestablished in 1969 and succeeded by today's United States Army Medical Research Institute of Infectious Diseases (USAMRIID).

The U.S. Department of Defense (DoD) has focused since at least 1998 on the development and application of vaccine-based biodefenses. In a July 2001 report commissioned by the DoD, the "DoD-critical products" were stated as vaccines against anthrax (AVA and Next Generation), smallpox, plague, tularemia, botulinum, ricin, and equine encephalitis. Note that two of these targets are toxins (botulinum and ricin) while the remainder are infectious agents.

==== Program Structure ====
A 1993 congressional mandate required all of DoD's chemical and biological defense activities to be coordinated by a single office.

USAMRIID (part of the United States Army Medical Research and Materiel Command) carries out much of the military's intramural medical biodefense research.

Advanced military vaccine development runs through the Joint Vaccine Acquisition Program (JVAP).

== Civilian ==
=== Role of public health and disease surveillance ===
It's extremely important to note that all of the classical and modern biological weapons organisms are animal diseases, the only exception being smallpox. Thus, in any use of biological weapons, it is highly likely that animals will become ill either simultaneously with, or perhaps earlier than humans.

Indeed, in the largest biological weapons accident known–the anthrax outbreak in Sverdlovsk (now Yekaterinburg) in the Soviet Union in 1979, sheep became ill with anthrax as far as 200 kilometers from the release point of the organism from a military facility in the southeastern portion of the city (known as Compound 19 and still off limits to visitors today, see Sverdlovsk anthrax leak).

Thus, a robust surveillance system involving human clinicians and veterinarians may identify a bioweapons attack early in the course of an epidemic, permitting the prophylaxis of disease in the vast majority of people (and/or animals) exposed but not yet ill.

For example, in the case of anthrax, it is likely that by 24–36 hours after an attack, some small percentage of individuals (such as the immunocompromised or those who had received a large dose of the organism due to proximity to the release point) will become ill with classical symptoms and signs (including a virtually unique chest X-ray finding, often recognized by public health officials if they receive timely reports). By making these data available to local public health officials in real time, most models of anthrax epidemics indicate that more than 80% of an exposed population can receive antibiotic treatment before becoming symptomatic, and thus avoid the moderately high mortality of the disease.

=== Identification of bioweapons ===
The goal of biodefense is to integrate the sustained efforts of the national and homeland security, medical, public health, intelligence, diplomatic, and police communities. Health care providers and public health officers are among the first lines of defense. In some countries private, local, and provincial (state) capabilities are being augmented by and coordinated with federal assets, to provide layered defenses against biological weapons attacks. During the first Gulf War the United Nations activated a biological and chemical response team, Task Force Scorpio, to respond to any potential use of weapons of mass destruction on civilians.

The traditional approach toward protecting agriculture, food, and water: focusing on the natural or unintentional introduction of a disease is being strengthened by focused efforts to address current and anticipated future biological weapons threats that may be deliberate, multiple, and repetitive.

The growing threat of biowarfare agents and bioterrorism has led to the development of specific field tools that perform on-the-spot analysis and identification of encountered suspect materials. One such technology, being developed by researchers from the Lawrence Livermore National Laboratory (LLNL), employs a "sandwich immunoassay", in which fluorescent dye-labeled antibodies aimed at specific pathogens are attached to silver and gold nanowires.

The U.S. National Institute of Allergy and Infectious Diseases (NIAID) also participates in the identification and prevention of biowarfare and first released a strategy for biodefense in 2002, periodically releasing updates as new pathogens are becoming topics of discussion. Within this list of strategies, responses for specific infectious agents are provided, along with the classification of these agents. NIAID provides countermeasures after the U.S. Department of Homeland Security details which pathogens hold the most threat.

=== Planning and response ===
Planning may involve the training human resources specialist and development of biological identification systems. Until recently in the United States, most biological defense strategies have been geared to protecting soldiers on the battlefield rather than ordinary people in cities. Financial cutbacks have limited the tracking of disease outbreaks. Some outbreaks, such as food poisoning due to E. coli or Salmonella, could be of either natural or deliberate origin.

Human Resource Training Programs

To date, several endangered countries have designed various training programs at their universities to train specialized personnel to deal with biological threats(for example: George Mason University Biodefense PhD program (USA) or Biodefense Strategic Studies PhD program designated by Dr Reza Aghanouri(Iran)). These programs are designed to prepare students and officers to serve as scholars and professionals in the fields of biodefense and biosecurity. These programs integrates knowledge of natural and man-made biological threats with the skills to develop and analyze policies and strategies for enhancing biosecurity. Other areas of biodefense, including nonproliferation, intelligence and threat assessment, and medical and public health preparedness are integral parts of these programs.

Preparedness

Biological agents are relatively easy to obtain by terrorists and are becoming more threatening in the U.S., and laboratories are working on advanced detection systems to provide early warning, identify contaminated areas and populations at risk, and to facilitate prompt treatment. Methods for predicting the use of biological agents in urban areas as well as assessing the area for the hazards associated with a biological attack are being established in major cities. In addition, forensic technologies are working on identifying biological agents, their geographical origins and/or their initial son. Efforts include decontamination technologies to restore facilities without causing additional environmental concerns.

Early detection and rapid response to bioterrorism depend on close cooperation between public health authorities and law enforcement; however, such cooperation is currently lacking. National detection assets and vaccine stockpiles are not useful if local and state officials do not have access to them.

United States strategy

In October 2022, the Biden Administration published the "National Biodefense Strategy and Implementation Plan for Countering Biological Threats, Enhancing Pandemic Preparedness, and Achieving Global Health." It updates the Presidency of Donald Trump's 2018 National Biodefense Strategy.

The U.S. government had a comprehensive defense strategy against bioterror attacks in 2004, when then-President George W. Bush signed a Homeland Security Presidential Directive 10. The directive laid out the country's 21st Century biodefense system and assigned various tasks to federal agencies that would prevent, protect and mitigate biological attacks against our homeland and global interests. Until 2018, however, the federal government did not have a comprehensive biodefense strategy.

Biosurveillance

In 1999, the University of Pittsburgh's Center for Biomedical Informatics deployed the first automated bioterrorism detection system, called RODS (Real-Time Outbreak Disease Surveillance). RODS is designed to draw collect data from many data sources and use them to perform signal detection, that is, to detect a possible bioterrorism event at the earliest possible moment. RODS, and other systems like it, collect data from sources including clinic data, laboratory data, and data from over-the-counter drug sales. In 2000, Michael Wagner, the codirector of the RODS laboratory, and Ron Aryel, a subcontractor, conceived the idea of obtaining live data feeds from "non-traditional" (non-health-care) data sources. The RODS laboratory's first efforts eventually led to the establishment of the National Retail Data Monitor, a system which collects data from 20,000 retail locations nationwide.

On February 5, 2002, George W. Bush visited the RODS laboratory and used it as a model for a $300 million spending proposal to equip all 50 states with biosurveillance systems. In a speech delivered at the nearby Masonic temple, Bush compared the RODS system to a modern "DEW" line (referring to the Cold War ballistic missile early warning system).

The principles and practices of biosurveillance, a new interdisciplinary science, were defined and described in the Handbook of Biosurveillance, edited by Michael Wagner, Andrew Moore and Ron Aryel, and published in 2006. Biosurveillance is the science of real-time disease outbreak detection. Its principles apply to both natural and man-made epidemics (bioterrorism).

Data which potentially could assist in early detection of a bioterrorism event include many categories of information. Health-related data such as that from hospital computer systems, clinical laboratories, electronic health record systems, medical examiner record-keeping systems, 911 call center computers, and veterinary medical record systems could be of help; researchers are also considering the utility of data generated by ranching and feedlot operations, food processors, drinking water systems, school attendance recording, and physiologic monitors, among others. Intuitively, one would expect systems which collect more than one type of data to be more useful than systems which collect only one type of information (such as single-purpose laboratory or 911 call-center based systems), and be less prone to false alarms, and this appears to be the case.

In Europe, disease surveillance is beginning to be organized on the continent-wide scale needed to track a biological emergency. The system not only monitors infected persons, but attempts to discern the origin of the outbreak.

Researchers are experimenting with devices to detect the existence of a threat:

- Tiny electronic chips that would contain living nerve cells to warn of the presence of bacterial toxins (identification of broad range toxins)
- Fiber-optic tubes lined with antibodies coupled to light-emitting molecules (identification of specific pathogens, such as anthrax, botulinum, ricin)

New research shows that ultraviolet avalanche photodiodes offer the high gain, reliability and robustness needed to detect anthrax and other bioterrorism agents in the air. The fabrication methods and device characteristics were described at the 50th Electronic Materials Conference in Santa Barbara on June 25, 2008. Details of the photodiodes were also published in the February 14, 2008 issue of the journal Electronics Letters and the November 2007 issue of the journal IEEE Photonics Technology Letters.

The United States Department of Defense conducts global biosurveillance through several programs, including the Global Emerging Infections Surveillance and Response System.

=== Response to bioterrorism incident or threat ===
Government agencies which would be called on to respond to a bioterrorism incident would include law enforcement, hazardous materials/decontamination units and emergency medical units. The US military has specialized units, which can respond to a bioterrorism event; among them are the United States Marine Corps' Chemical Biological Incident Response Force and the U.S. Army's 20th Support Command (CBRNE), which can detect, identify, and neutralize threats, and decontaminate victims exposed to bioterror agents. There are four hospitals capable of caring for anyone with an exposure to a BSL3 or BSL4 pathogen, the special clinical studies unit at National Institutes of Health is one of them. National Institutes of Health built a facility in April 2010. This unit has state of the art isolation capabilities with a unique airflow system. This unit is also being trained to care for patients who are ill due to a highly infectious pathogen outbreak, such as ebola. The doctors work closely with USAMRIID, NBACC and IRF. Special trainings take place regularly in order to maintain a high level of confidence to care for these patients.

== Biodefense market ==
In 2015, global biodefense market was estimated at $9.8 billion. Experts correlated the large marketplace to an increase in government attention and support as a result of rising bioterrorism threats worldwide. Government's heightened interest is anticipated expand the industry into the foreseeable future. According to Medgadget.com, "Many government legislations like Project Bioshield offers nations with counter measures against chemical, radiological, nuclear and biological attack."

Project Bioshield offers accessible biological countermeasures targeting various strains of smallpox and anthrax. "Main goal of the project is creating funding authority to build next generation counter measures, make innovative research & development programs and create a body like FDA (Food & Drug Administration) that can effectively use treatments in case of emergencies." Increased funding, in addition to public health organizations' elevated consideration in biodefense technology investments, could trigger growth in the global biodefense market.

The global biodefense market is divided into geographical locations such as APAC, Latin America, Europe, MEA, and North America. The biodefense industry in North America lead the global industry by a large margin, making it the highest regional revenue share for 2015, contributing approximately $8.91 billion of revenue this year, due to immense funding and government reinforcements. The biodefense market in Europe is predicted to register a CAGR of 11.41% by the forecast timeline. The United Kingdom's Ministry of Defense granted $75.67 million designated for defense & civilian research, making it the highest regional industry share for 2012.

In 2016, Global Market Insights released a report covering the new trends in the biodefense market backed by detailed, scientific data. Industry leaders in biodefense market include the following corporations: Emergent Biosolutions, SIGA Technologies, Ichor Medical Systems Incorporation, PharmaAthene, Cleveland BioLabs Incorporation, Achaogen (bankrupt in 2019), Alnylam Pharmaceuticals, Avertis, Xoma Corporation, Dynavax Technologies Incorporation, Elusys Therapeutics, DynPort Vaccine Company LLC, Bavarian Nordic and Nanotherapeutics Incorporation.

== Legislation ==
In July 2018, during the 115th Congress of the United States, four Members of Congress, both Republican and Democrat (Anna Eshoo, Susan Brooks, Frank Palone and Greg Walden) introduced biodefense legislation called the Pandemic and All Hazards Preparedness and Advancing Innovation Act (PAHPA) (H.R. 6378). The bill strengthens the federal government's preparedness to deal with a wide range of public health emergencies, whether created through an act of bioterrorism or occurring through a natural disaster. The bill reauthorizes funding to improve bioterrorism and other public health emergency preparedness and response activities such as the Hospital Preparedness Program, the Public Health Emergency Preparedness Cooperative Agreement, Project BioShield, and BARDA for the advanced research and development of medical countermeasures (MCMs).

H.R. 6378 has 24 cosponsors from both political parties. On September 25, 2018, the House of Representatives passed the bill.

== See also ==
- Fluctuation-enhanced sensing of biological and chemical agents
- National Biodefense Analysis and Countermeasures Center (NBACC)
- Sensing of phage-triggered ion cascades
- United States Army Medical Research Institute of Infectious Diseases (USAMRIID)
- United States biological defense program
