= MC4 =

MC4 may refer to:

- Medical Communications for Combat Casualty Care, known as MC4
- MC4 connector, electrical connector commonly used for connecting solar panels
- MC_{4} protein receptor
- Modern Combat 4: Zero Hour known online as MC4
- MC4 (album), second studio album by American rapper French Montana
- the World Trade Organization Ministerial Conference of 2001
- Mega City Four, a British rock band
