= National Interagency Biodefense Campus =

The National Interagency Biodefense Campus is a facility in Frederick, Maryland, at Fort Detrick. It hosts members of a scientific collaboration, the National Interagency Confederation for Biological Research.

Planning began in 2002, and construction of the NICB began in 2005. The center was expected to cost over $1 billion.

The National Institute of Allergy and Infectious Diseases Integrated Research Facility was completed in 2007, and expected to cost $105 million.

The National Biodefense Analysis and Countermeasures Center was completed in 2008. The facility has over 160,000 sq ft, with BSL-2, BSL-3, and BSL-4 laboratories. It cost approximately $128 million.

A building replacing the old headquarters of the United States Army Medical Research Institute of Infectious Diseases (USAMRIID) began construction in 2007.

NICB houses biosafety level 3 and 4 laboratories.
