= Richard O. Spertzel =

Microbiologist in the United States of America

Richard Oscar Spertzel (9 February 1933 – 24 March 2016) was a veterinarian, microbiologist and expert in the area of biological warfare. He participated in germ warfare research at U.S. Army Medical Unit (USAMU), Fort Detrick, Frederick, Maryland. (USAMU is now known as the U.S. Army Medical Research Institute of Infectious Diseases, or USAMRIID).

Spertzel held several positions USAMRIID including Deputy for Research, Deputy Commander, and Chief of the Animal Assessment Division. From 1994 to 1998 Spertzel served as the Senior Biologist for the United Nations Special Commission in Iraq. His Congressional testimonial about the WMD capabilities of Iraq helped to justify the subsequent US invasion of Iraq. After the invasion, Spertzel was a member of the Iraq Survey Group, which found that Iraq was not producing nor planning to produce WMD at the time of the invasion.

== Education ==
He was born on February 9, 1933, in Huntington Township, Pennsylvania. In 1955, Spertzel earned a Bachelor of Arts in microbiology at the University of Pennsylvania. Sperzel did postgraduate work at the University of Pennsylvania School of Veterinary Medicine, earning a Master's Degree in radiation biology by the Graduate School of Medicine and Dentistry at the University of Rochester in 1962. His terminal degree was obtained in 1970, a Ph.D. in microbiology from the University of Notre Dame.

== Career ==
=== 2003 invasion of Iraq ===
As part of the Congressional hearings prior to authorization of the invasion of Iraq, Spertzel provided testimony to the United States House Committee on Armed Services on September 10, 2002.

Testimony by Spertzel:

- "From its inception in the 1970s, Iraq's BW program included both military and terrorist applications."
- "Although Iraq claims that it 'obliterated' the program in 1991 (without the supervision by the UN as was set out in the ceasefire resolution 687, April 1991), and in so doing it destroyed all weapons and bulk agents unilaterally without any further documentation. The evidence indicates rather that Iraq continued to expand its BW capabilities."
- "Iraq asserts that the program was obliterated in 1991 but this is patently not true."
- "Documentation recovered by UNSCOM indicated a continued build up of Iraq's BW program capability."
- "It has had 12 years to advance its viral capability and, as I have cited elsewhere, this almost certainly includes smallpox as an agent."
- "There is no doubt in my mind that Iraq has a much stronger biological warfare program today than it had in 1990."

After the 2003 invasion of Iraq, the U.S. federal government concluded that Iraq did not have weapons of mass destruction during the period leading up to the 2003 invasion of Iraq after reviewing the Iraq Survey Group's final report on September 30, 2004. Claimed links of Iraq to terrorist groups like al Qaeda were never verified, and the 9/11 Commission concluded that there was no real evidence of such links. Much of the intelligence suggesting WMD in Iraq prior to the 2003 invasion was fabricated by groups like the Iraqi National Congress.

== See also ==
- Benador Associates
