= Nancy Haigwood =

American scientist

- Haigwood in 2013
- Education: University of North Carolina at Chapel Hill (Ph.D.)
- Known for: HIV/AIDS research
- Scientific career
- Workplaces: University of Washington; Oregon National Primate Research Center
- Thesis: The organization of repetitive sequences in two cloned mouse beta-globin clusters (1980)

Nancy Logan Haigwood is an American scientist. She is a professor and a former director of the Oregon National Primate Research Center. Haigwood is an HIV/AIDS researcher and serves as a volunteer board member at CAP Northwest (formerly Cascade AIDS Project). She is an advocate of science education and outreach.

== Education ==
Haigwood earned a doctor of philosophy at University of North Carolina at Chapel Hill in 1980. She was the graduate mentor to the Kappa Kappa Gamma chapter at Chapel Hill. Her dissertation was titled The organization of repetitive sequences in two cloned mouse beta-globin clusters. Haigwood completed a postdoctoral fellowship at Johns Hopkins University from 1979 to 1981.

== Career ==
Haigwood worked for 17 years in the biotechnology and pharmaceutical industry. A large portion of this was at the Chiron Corporation (Novartis) and the Bristol-Myers Squibb Pharmaceutical Research Institute. She was a professor of microbiology and pathology from 1997 to 2007 at the University of Washington and a member of the Center for Global Infectious Disease Research. In 2007, she became the fifth director of the Oregon National Primate Research Center. She is a volunteer board member of CAP Northwest (formerly Cascade AIDS Project) and an advocate for science education and outreach. Haigwood has researched HIV/AIDS with an emphasis in preventing mother to child transmission and on vaccines since 1986.

== Awards and honors ==
Haigwood is a Fellow of the American Society for Microbiology. She won the Cascade AIDS Project 2017 Action Award for her "outstanding volunteer service to this AIDS service organization."

== Personal life ==
Haigwood contacted the Federal Bureau of Investigation in early 2002 after she had suspicions that Bruce Edwards Ivins was behind the 2001 anthrax attacks.
