= Frederick National Laboratory for Cancer Research =

Facility in Frederick, Maryland, United States

Coordinates: 39.438761°N 77.362607°W

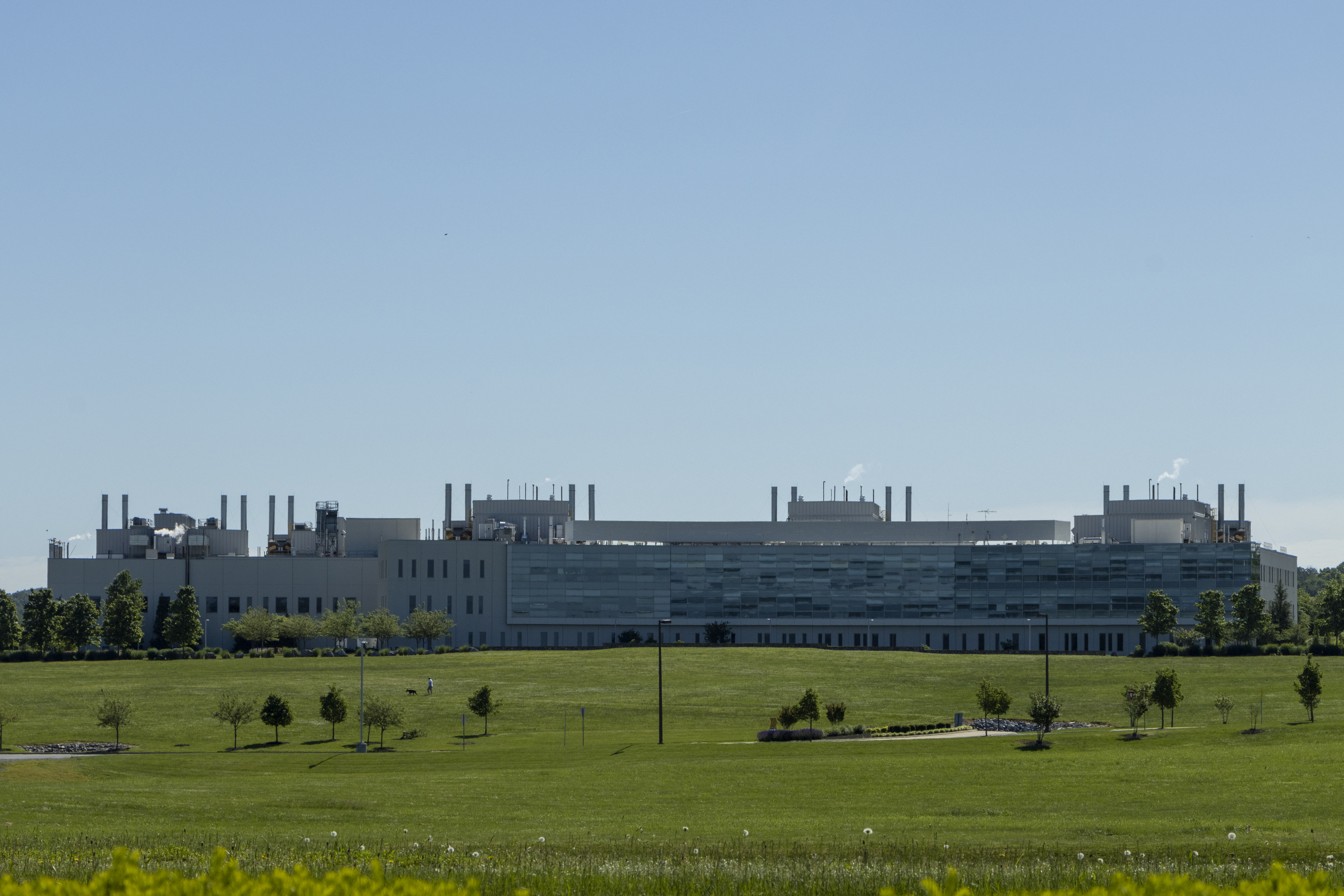
The main building of FNLCR is the Advanced Technology Research Facility in Frederick, Maryland

The Frederick National Laboratory for Cancer Research (FNLCR) is one of the 18 United States National Laboratories and the only U.S. National Laboratory exclusively dedicated to biomedical research. The Frederick National Laboratory is sponsored by the National Institutes of Health (NIH) and National Cancer Institute (NCI) as a federally funded research and development center, and its day-to-day operation is managed by the private contractor Leidos Biomedical Research for the NCI. The institution was originally established under the name NCI-Frederick Cancer Research Center in 1972 as a component of U.S. president Richard Nixon's war on cancer initiative. In 2012, the institution received a National Laboratory designation and assumed its current name, becoming the only U.S. national laboratory dedicated entirely to biomedical research. The campus located within Fort Detrick U.S. Army Installation in Frederick, Maryland, also houses National Cancer Institute laboratories and administrative organizations, and is colloquially referred to as NCI-Frederick.

== History ==
As part of the 1971 war on cancer initiative, Richard Nixon requested that the United States Army transfer land and buildings which were then part of Fort Detrick to the Department of Health and Human Services in order to support the research efforts of the National Cancer Institute. The new laboratory was established in 1972 under the name "Frederick Cancer Research and Development Center" and received a designation as a Federally Funded Research and Development Center in 1975. This organizational model, also used by Lawrence Livermore National Laboratory and Los Alamos National Laboratory among others, specifies a type of public-private partnership composed of an institution that is owned by the federal government but operated by a private contractor.

The laboratory was administratively reorganized in 1981, resulting in changing the name to "Frederick Cancer Research Center". In 2012, it was formally designated "Frederick National Laboratory for Cancer Research", becoming the first U.S. national laboratory owned by the Department of Health and Human Services and the only one exclusively dedicated to biomedical research. (HHS has since also established the CMS Alliance to Modernize Healthcare in cooperation with the Centers for Medicare and Medicaid Services.) The transition to redesignate FNLCR as a national laboratory was spearheaded by then-NCI director Harold Varmus.

== Current operations ==
FNLCR currently operates a number of research programs and facilities designed to support National Institutes of Health research goals. FNLCR contains two pharmaceutical manufacturing facilities to support clinical trials run by the National Cancer Institute and the National Institute of Allergy and Infectious Diseases; manages a large collection of research samples, biological specimens, and mouse models used in cancer research; and hosts specific research projects such as the RAS Initiative, aimed at studying the biology of common oncogenes in the Ras subfamily, and the Nanotechnology Characterization Laboratory.

Since 1995, the contractor operating the facility has been Leidos Biomedical Research (formerly SAIC-Frederick). That contract was renewed for ten years in 2008. In 2015 the NCI began seeking applications for a new contract expected to be awarded in January 2017; however, this search was suspended in September 2016. In January 2025, NCI awarded the nonprofit Alliance for Advancing Biomedical Research, an entity from the University of California system, an $89 billion Operations contract that could last up to 25 years, however that contract was cancelled soon after award and proposals for operation are being re-evaluated.

== NCI-Frederick ==
In addition to the FNLCR, the Frederick biomedical research campus also houses NCI facilities such as research laboratories, administrative organizations, and the separate NCI Center for Cancer Research. The facilities are collectively known as NCI-Frederick but are administratively distinct.
