= Operation Whitecoat =

US biodefense medical research program

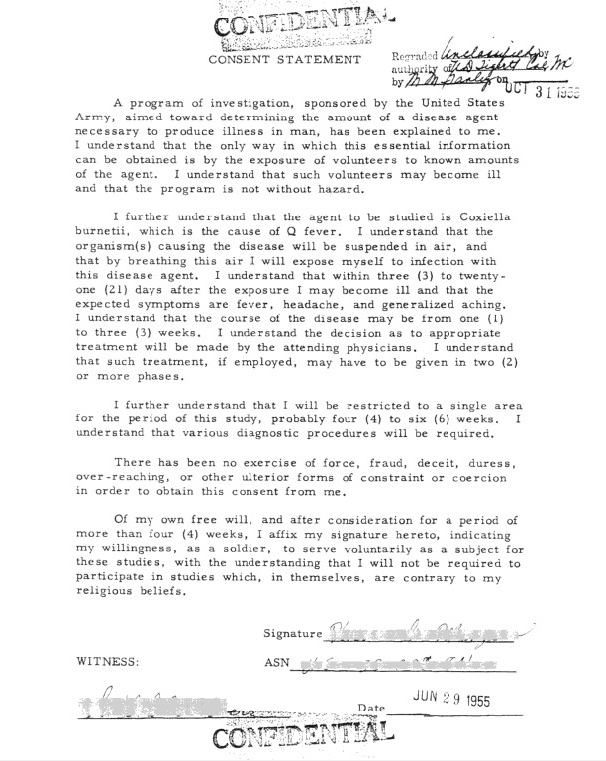
A Consent Statement (1955) for one of the Operation Whitecoat experiments at Fort Detrick

Operation Whitecoat was a biodefense medical research program carried out by the United States Army at Fort Detrick, Maryland, between 1954 and 1973. The program pursued medical research using volunteer enlisted personnel who were eventually nicknamed "Whitecoats". These volunteers, all conscientious objectors, including many members of the Seventh-day Adventist Church, were informed of the purpose and goals of each project before providing consent to participate in any project. The stated purpose of the research was to defend troops and civilians against biological weapons.

Although the program was discontinued in 1973, human use research for biodefense purposes is still conducted at the U.S. Army Medical Research Institute of Infectious Diseases (USAMRIID) at Fort Detrick and at other government and civilian research institutes. However, these post-Whitecoat studies are often human use challenge studies, in which a person is inoculated with a known pathogen to determine how effective an investigational treatment will be.

== History ==
Over the course of the 19-year program, more than 2,300 U.S. Army soldiers, many of whom were trained medics, contributed to the Whitecoat experiments by allowing themselves to be infected with numerous different kinds of bacteria that were considered likely choices for a biological attack. While some volunteered immediately after basic training, for conscientious objectors at Ft. Sam Houston, Texas (before they began their medic training), the near certainty of being assigned as a combat medic in Vietnam helped some medics choose instead to remain in the United States with the Whitecoat program. The goal of the program was to determine dose response for these agents. The volunteers were then treated with antibiotics to cure the infections. Some volunteers, under experimental protocol, were also given investigational vaccines for Q fever and tularemia, as well as for yellow fever, Rift Valley fever, hepatitis A, Yersinia pestis (plague), and Venezuelan equine encephalitis and other diseases. Some soldiers were given two weeks of leave in exchange for being used as a test subject. These experiments took place at Fort Detrick which is a U.S. Army research installation in Frederick, Maryland.

The volunteers were allowed to consult with outside sources, such as family and clergy members, before deciding to participate. The participants were required to sign consent forms after discussing the risks and treatments with a medical officer. Of the soldiers who were approached about participating, 20% declined.

=== Results ===
Many of the vaccines that protect against biowarfare agents were first tested on humans in Operation Whitecoat.

According to USAMRIID, the Whitecoat operation contributed to vaccines approved by the U.S. Food and Drug Administration (FDA) for yellow fever and hepatitis, and investigational drugs for Q fever, Venezuelan equine encephalitis, Rift Valley fever, and tularemia. USAMRIID also states that Operation Whitecoat helped develop biological safety equipment, including hooded safety cabinets, decontamination procedures, fermentors, incubators, centrifuges, and particle sizers.

=== Discontinuation ===
Operation Whitecoat came to an end in 1973 when the draft for the U.S. military ended and thus no more conscientious objectors were to be conscripted.

== Legacy ==
=== US GAO report ===
The United States Government Accountability Office issued a report on September 28, 1994, which stated that between 1940 and 1974, the United States Department of Defense and other national security agencies studied hundreds of thousands of human subjects in tests and experiments involving hazardous substances.

A quotation from the study:

Many experiments that tested various biological agents on human subjects, referred to as Operation Whitecoat, were carried out at Fort Detrick, Maryland, in the 1950s. The human subjects originally consisted of volunteer enlisted men. However, after the enlisted men staged a sitdown strike to obtain more information about the dangers of the biological tests, Seventh-day Adventists who were conscientious objectors were recruited for the studies.

=== Possible long-term health effects ===
No Whitecoats died during the test period. The Army has addresses for only 1000 of the 2300 people known to have volunteered. Only about 500 (23%) of the Whitecoats have been surveyed, and the military chose not to fund blood tests. A handful of respondents claim to have lingering health effects, and at least one subject claims to have serious health problems as a result of the experiments.

In 2005, an assessment of health status among the Project Whitecoat research volunteers was published. It reflected the self-reported, current health status among 358 "exposed" individuals and 164 unexposed "control" subjects and found no conclusive evidence that receipt of investigational agents was related to any adverse health outcomes. No differences in current overall health, current exercise levels, self-reported symptoms, and self-reported medical conditions were seen between the study groups. However, possible associations were seen between exposure to antibiotics or other biological agents and self-reported asthma, as well as between receipt of tularemia vaccine(s) and self-reported asthma and increased frequency/severity of headaches. The size of the study population was judged to be insufficient to assert with confidence that the statistical associations with asthma and headaches were real.

== Seventh-day Adventists and Operation Whitecoat ==
=== Seventh-day Adventist view of military service ===
The Seventh-day Adventist Church's relationship to government military activity has been supportive but noncombative. In 1936, the Adventist Church established the Medical Cadet Corps Training Program. This allowed Adventists to remain noncombatant but positive toward the war effort. Sabbath observance remained a concern for the drafted members of the church. Adventist Conscientious Objector perspective differed from the National Interreligious Service Board for Conscientious Objectors, (NISBCO). In 1967, Adventists withdrew from NISBCO because that organization opposed conscription. According to Bull and Lockhart, Operation Whitecoat, and the earlier established Medical Corps, enabled Adventists to participate in the armed services without violating their Sabbath principles.

== See also ==
- Human experimentation in the United States
- US Senate Report on chemical weapons
- Project SHAD
- US Biological Weapon Testing
