= Medical Communications for Combat Casualty Care =

Medical Communications for Combat Casualty Care (MC4) is a deployable health support information management system of the U.S. Army.

MC4 integrates, fields and provides technical support for a comprehensive medical information system enabling lifelong electronic medical records, streamlined medical logistics and enhanced situational awareness for Army operational forces. By accomplishing this mission, the MC4 Product Management Office (PMO) provides the U.S. Army’s solution to the Presidential and Congressional objectives set-forth by U.S. Code Title 10 in 1997, which called for a medical tracking system for all deployed Service members.

== Software and hardware ==
MC4 is a (semi-) ruggedized system-of-systems containing medical software packages fielded to operational medical forces worldwide. The MC4 PMO provides Army-specific infrastructure (MC4 system) to support deployment of the Defense Health Information Management System (DHIMS), Theater Medical Information Program-Joint (TMIP-J) products. The TMIP-J applications include software for electronic medical record (EMR) documentation, a web-based application that serves as a deployed EMR repository and a web-based application for conducting battlefield surveillance.

Although the MC4 program doesn't create the software, the MC4 program does provide the tools needed to digitally record and transfer critical medical data from the foxhole to medical treatment facilities around the world.

MC4 is more than an EMR. The MC4 system is the Army's tactical medical information system including software from multiple sources, future systems and applications, package fielding and technical support.

Deployable medical forces use the MC4 system to gain quick, accurate access to patient histories and forward casualty resuscitation information. The system also provides automated tools facilitating patient and item tracking, blood management, medical reporting and medical logistical support.

== Training, fielding and support ==
MC4 provides new equipment training while Unit Commanders are responsible for sustainment training. MC4 is always looking at new ways to provide training that aligns with its charter and resources.

First deployed in 2003, MC4 has fielded systems to tactical medical units throughout Iraq, Kuwait, Qatar and Afghanistan, making it the most comprehensive information management/information technology medical system deployed to date.

MC4 support personnel assure system sustainability.

This commitment is supported by regional support centers in the U.S., South Korea, Europe, Kuwait, and currently Afghanistan as well as a 24-7, online helpdesk, providing a worldwide sustainment and technical support structure.

== Supporting the future ==
The U.S. Army recognizes that the MC4 system is an evolving capability required to support current and emerging medical information technologies needed by deployed medical forces.

As such, MC4 is strategically integrating with future Army systems, including PEO Soldier. MC4 will provide an interface to these systems that enables automated assessment and remote monitoring capabilities for deployed medical forces.

== Summary ==
- MC4 provides deployed medical forces (1) quick, accurate access to patient histories and forward, (2) casualty resuscitation information, and (3) automation tools facilitating (a) patient tracking, (b) medical reporting, and (c) medical logistics support.
- MC4 provides combatant commanders (1) medical surveillance information, (2) theater-wide trend analysis capabilities, and (3) enhanced medical situational awareness.
- MC4 provides Service members (1) secure, accessible, lifelong electronic medical records, (2) easier access to medical benefits, (3) peace of mind, and (4) better-informed healthcare providers.

== See also ==
- Fort Detrick
