= United States Army Medical Unit =

Defunct US army medical research unit

The United States Army Medical Unit (1956–1969) – a now defunct medical research unit for biodefense – was at Fort Detrick, Maryland, US. In contrast to the U.S. Army Biological Warfare Laboratories (1943–1969), also at Fort Detrick, the USAMU's mission was purely to develop defensive measures against bio-agents, as opposed to weapons development. The USAMU was the predecessor to today's USAMRIID.

== History ==
The U.S. Army Medical Unit (USAMU or AMU) was originally established on 20 June 1956 under the jurisdiction of Walter Reed Army Medical Center (WRAMC). The first USAMU commander was Col. William D. Tigertt. One of the USAMU's first responsibilities was to oversee all aspects of Project CD-22, the exposure of volunteers to aerosols containing a highly pathogenic strain of Coxiella burnetii, the causal agent of Q fever. One pre-existing research project, Operation Whitecoat (1954–1973), outlasted the USAMU. (It was a medical research program using volunteer enlisted personnel – all conscientious objectors.) General Order 9, dated 29 September 1958, Office of The Surgeon General, assigned the USAMU to Headquarters, U.S. Army Medical Research and Development Command (USAMRDC). In 1961, Col. Dan Crozier assumed command of the USAMU. Modern principles of biosafety and biocontainment were pioneered at Fort Detrick throughout the 1960s by a number of scientists led by Arnold G. Wedum. General Order No. 6, dated 27 January 1969, Office of The Surgeon General, redesignated the USAMU as the U.S. Army Medical Research Institute of Infectious Diseases (USAMRIID) still assigned to USAMRDC.

== See also ==
- United States biological defense program
- List of former United States Army medical units
