= United States Army Medical Research Institute of Chemical Defense =

USAMRICD Seal

The United States Army Medical Research Institute of Chemical Defense (USAMRICD) is a military medical research institute located at Aberdeen Proving Ground, Maryland, US. It is the leading science and technology laboratory of the Department of Defense for the development, testing, and evaluation of medical chemical warfare countermeasures including therapies and materials to treat casualties of chemical warfare agents.

The mission of USAMRICD — known in the 1950s and 1960s as the Medical Research Laboratories — includes fundamental and applied research in the pharmacology, physiology, toxicology, pathology, and biochemistry of chemical agents and their medical countermeasures. In addition to research, the Institute, in partnership with the United States Army Medical Research Institute of Infectious Diseases (USAMRIID), educates health care providers in the medical management of chemical and biological agent casualties. The USAMRICD supports a Chemical/Biological Rapid Response Team (C/B-RRT), supports and trains Area Medical Laboratory (formerly Theater Area Medical Laboratory) personnel, and maintains a chemical surety facility.

USAMRICD is a subsidiary of United States Army Medical Research and Materiel Command (USAMRMC) and houses more than 300 employees, including researchers and support personnel. The United States Army Center for Environmental Health Research, Fort Detrick, Maryland is part of USAMRICD.

== See also ==
- Biological warfare
- Chemical warfare
- United States Army Medical Research Institute of Infectious Diseases
