= Fort Detrick =

Military base and biological laboratory in US

Coordinates: 39.4356°N 77.4272°W

- Frederick, Maryland, U.S.
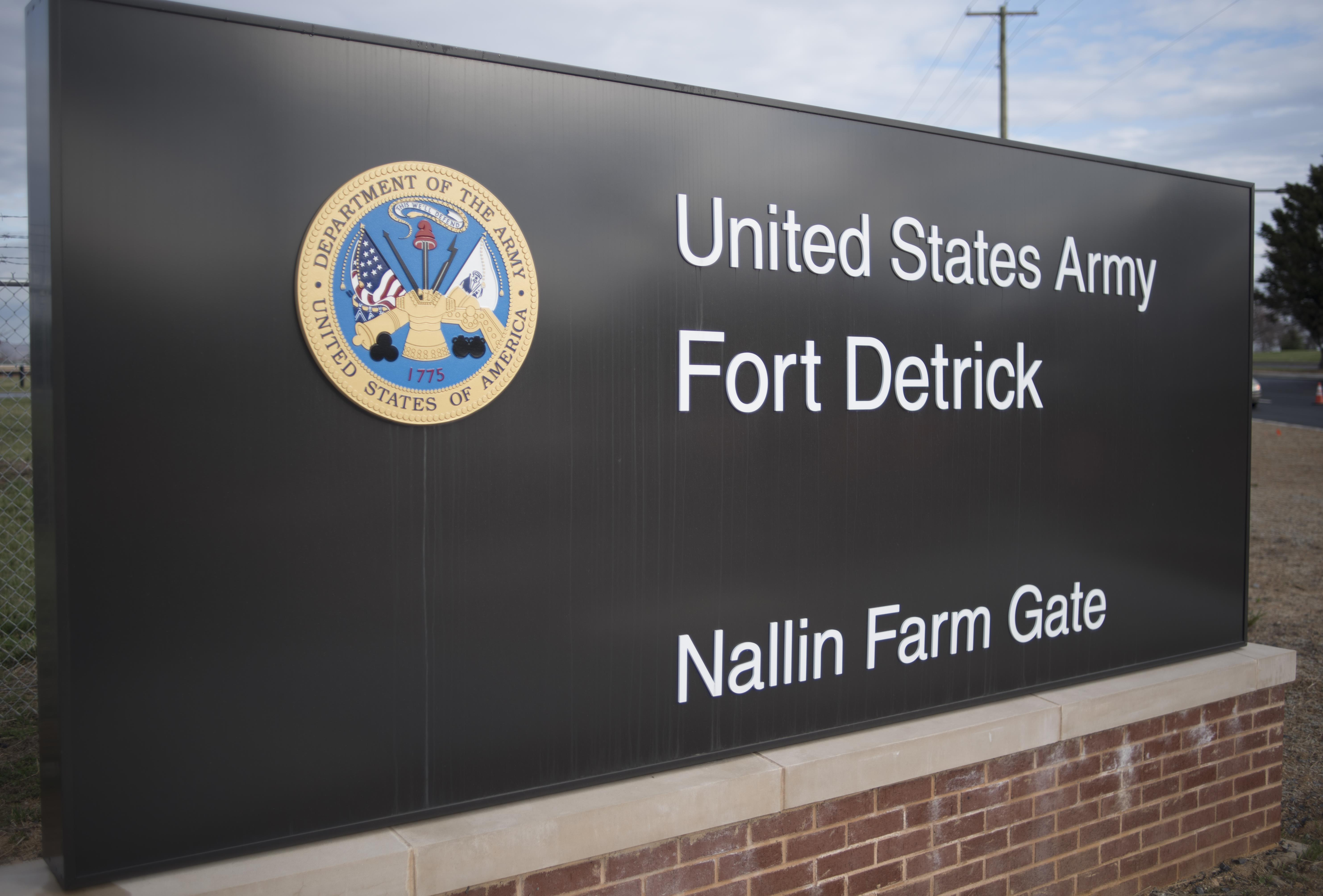
- Sign at one of the installation's gates

Site information
- Type: Military installation
- Controlled by: United States Army

Location
- Location of Fort Detrick in Maryland Fort Detrick (the United States)

Site history
- Built: 1931
- In use: 1931–present

Fort Detrick (/ˈdiːtrɪk/) is located in Frederick, Maryland. Fort Detrick was the center of the U.S. biological weapons program from 1943 to 1969. Since the discontinuation of that program, it has hosted most elements of the United States biological defense program.

As of the early 2010s, Fort Detrick's 1,200-acre (490 ha) campus supports a multi-governmental community that conducts biomedical research and development, medical materiel management, global medical communications and the study of foreign plant pathogens. The lab is known to research pathogens such as Ebola and smallpox.

Fort Detrick is also a U.S. Army Medical Research and Development Command (USAMRDC) installation, with its bio-defense agency, the U.S. Army Medical Research Institute of Infectious Diseases (USAMRIID). It also hosts the National Cancer Institute (NCI) Frederick Campus, Frederick National Laboratory for Cancer Research and is home to the National Interagency Confederation for Biological Research (NICBR), National Interagency Biodefense Campus (NIBC), National Biodefense Analysis and Countermeasures Center, and the National Center for Medical Intelligence (NCMI).

In August 2019, its deadly germ research operations were shut down following serious safety violations, in particular relating to the disposal of dangerous materials.

Fort Detrick is the largest employer in Frederick County, Maryland.

== History ==
Five farms originally constituted what is today known as "Area A" with 800 acres (320 ha), or the main post area of Fort Detrick, where most installation activities are located. "Area B" – known as "The Farm" and consisting of nearly 400 acres (160 ha) – was purchased in 1946 to provide a test area west of Rosemont Avenue, then called Yellow Springs Pike. In addition, the post's water and waste water treatment plants comprise about 16 acres (6.5 ha) on the banks of the Monocacy River.

=== Detrick Field (1931–43) ===
Fort Detrick traces its roots to a small municipal airport established at Frederick, Maryland, in 1929. It was operated by a single person and the field was one of a string of emergency airfields between Cleveland, Ohio, and Washington, D.C., until 1938. The field was named in honor of squadron flight surgeon Major Frederick L. Detrick who served in France during World War I and died in June 1931 of a heart attack. The first military presence there was the encampment, on 10 August 1931 (two months after the Major's death), of his unit: the 104th Observation Squadron of the 29th Division, Maryland National Guard. The Squadron flew de Havilland observation biplanes and Curtiss JN-4 "Jennies".

A concrete and tarmac airfield replaced the grass field in 1939, and an upgraded Detrick Field served as a Cadet Pilot Training Center until the country's entry into World War II. Detrick Field was formally leased from the City of Frederick in 1940 (having previously been leased from the state for just two weeks per year). The last airplanes departed Detrick Field in December 1941 and January 1942 after the Japanese attack on Pearl Harbor. All aircraft and pilots in the 104th and the cadet program were reassigned after the Declaration of War to conduct antisubmarine patrols off the Atlantic Coast. The 2nd Bombardment Squadron, U.S. Army Air Corps was reconstituted at Detrick Field between March and September 1942, when it deployed to England to become the nucleus of the new Eighth Air Force headquarters. Thereafter, the base ceased to be an aviation center. The airfields buildings, runway and tarmac have all disappeared which ran along today's Hamilton Street from Beasley Drive to about Neiman Street.

=== Camp Detrick (1943–56) ===
On 9 March 1943, the government purchased 154 acres (62 ha) encompassing the original 92 acres (37 ha) and re-christened the facility "Camp Detrick". The same year saw the establishment of the U.S. Army Biological Warfare Laboratories (USBWL), responsible for pioneering research into biocontainment, decontamination, gaseous sterilization, and agent purification. The first commander, Lt. Col. William S. Bacon, and his successor, Col. Martin B. Chittick, oversaw the initial $1.25 million renovation and construction of the base.

==== World War II and Biological Warfare research (1943–45) ====
During World War II, Camp Detrick and the USBWL became the site of intensive biological warfare (BW) research using various pathogens. This research was originally overseen by pharmaceuticals executive George W. Merck and for many years was conducted by Ira L. Baldwin, professor of bacteriology at the University of Wisconsin. Baldwin became the first scientific director of the labs. He chose Detrick Field for the site of this exhaustive research effort because of its balance between remoteness of location and proximity to Washington, D.C. – as well as to Edgewood Arsenal, the focal point of U.S. chemical warfare research. Buildings and other facilities left from the old airfield – including the large hangar – provided the nucleus of support needed for the startup. The 92 acres (37 ha) of Detrick Field were also surrounded by extensive farmlands that could be procured if and when the BW effort was expanded.

The Army's Chemical Warfare Service was given responsibility and oversight for the effort that one officer described as "cloaked in the deepest wartime secrecy, matched only by ... the Manhattan Project for developing the Atomic Bomb". Three months after the start of construction, an additional $3 million was provided for five additional laboratories and a pilot plant. Lt. Col. Bacon was authorized 85 officers, 373 enlisted personnel, and 80 enlisted Women's Army Auxiliary Corps (WAAC) members under two WAAC officers. At its peak strength in 1945, Camp Detrick had 240 officers and 1,530 enlisted personnel including WACs.

After the defeat of Japan, the researchers working at Unit 731 were given immunity from prosecution. In return, director Shirō Ishii provided "8,000 slides of tissue from human and animal dissections" from the experiments, which were reportedly stored at Fort Detrick.

==== Post-war years (1946–55) ====
The elaborate security precautions taken at Camp Detrick were so effective that it was not until January 1946, four months after VJ Day that the public learned of the war-time research in biological weapons.

In 1952, the Army purchased over 500 acres (200 ha) more of land located between West 7th Street and Oppossumtown Pike to expand the permanent research and development facilities.

Two workers at the base died from exposure to anthrax in the 1950s. Another died in 1964 from viral encephalitis.

There was a building on the base, Building 470, locally referred to as "Anthrax Tower". Building 470 was a pilot plant for testing optimal fermentor and bacterial purification technologies. The information gained in this pilot plant shaped the fermentor technology that was ultimately used by the pharmaceutical industry to revolutionize the production of antibiotics and other drugs. Building 470 was torn down in 2003 without any adverse effects on the demolition workers or the environment. The facility acquired the nickname "Fort Doom" while offensive biological warfare research was undertaken there. 5,000 bombs containing anthrax spores were produced at the base during World War II.

From 1945 to 1955 under Project Paperclip and its successors, the U.S. government recruited over 1,600 German and Austrian scientists and engineers in a variety of fields such as aircraft design, missile technology and biological warfare. Among the specialists in the latter field who ended up working in the U.S. were Walter Schreiber, Erich Traub and Kurt Blome, who had been involved with medical experiments on concentration camp inmates to test biological warfare agents. Since Britain, France and the Soviet Union were also engaged in recruiting these scientists, the Joint Intelligence Objectives Agency (JIOA) wished to deny their services to other powers, and therefore altered or concealed the records of their Nazi past and involvement in war crimes.

==== Testing performed on Seventh-day Adventists (1940–1974) ====
The U.S. General Accounting Office issued a report on September 28, 1994, which stated that between 1940 and 1974, DOD and other national security agencies studied hundreds of thousands of human subjects in tests and experiments involving hazardous substances.

The quote from the study:

Many experiments that tested various biological agents on human subjects, referred to as Operation Whitecoat, were carried out at Fort Detrick, Maryland, in the 1950s. The human subjects originally consisted of volunteer enlisted men. However, after the enlisted men staged a sitdown strike to obtain more information about the dangers of the biological tests, Seventh-day Adventists (SDAs) who were conscientious objectors were recruited for the studies.

The Army purchased an additional 147 acres (59 ha) in 1946 to increase the size of the original "Area A" as well as 398 acres (161 ha) located west of Area A, but not contiguous to it, to provide a test area known as Area B. In 1952, another 502.76 acres (203.5 ha) were purchased between West 7th Street and Oppossumtown Pike to expand the permanent research and development facilities.

Jeffrey Alan Lockwood wrote in 2009 that the biological warfare program at Ft. Detrick began to research the use of insects as disease vectors going back to World War II and also employed German and Japanese scientists after the war who had experimented on human subjects among POWs and concentration camp inmates. Scientists used or attempted to use a wide variety of insects in their biowar plans, including fleas, ticks, ants, lice and mosquitoes – especially mosquitoes that carried the yellow fever virus. They also tested these in the United States. Lockwood thinks that it is very likely that the U.S. did use insects dropped from aircraft during the Korean War to spread diseases, and that the Chinese and North Koreans were not simply engaged in a propaganda campaign when they made these allegations, since the Joint Chiefs of Staff and Secretary of Defense had approved their use in the fall of 1950 at the "earliest practicable time". At that time, it had five biowarfare agents ready for use, three of which were spread by insect vectors.

=== Fort Detrick (1956–present) ===
==== Cold War years (1956–89) ====
Camp Detrick was designated a permanent installation for peacetime biological research and development shortly after World War II, but that status was not confirmed until 1956, when the post became Fort Detrick. Its mandate was to continue its previous mission of biomedical research and its role as the world's leading research campus for biological agents requiring specialty containment.

The most recent land acquisition for the fort was a parcel of less than 3 acres (1.2 ha) along the Rosemont Avenue fence in 1962, completing the present 1,200 acres (490 ha).

On Veterans Day, November 11, 1969, President Richard M. Nixon asked the Senate to ratify the 1925 Geneva Protocol prohibiting the use of chemical and biological weapons. Nixon assured Fort Detrick its research would continue. On November 25, 1969, Nixon made a statement outlawing offensive biological research in the United States. Since that time any research done at Fort Detrick has allegedly been purely defensive in nature, focusing on diagnostics, preventives and treatments for BW infections. This research is undertaken by the U.S. Army Medical Research Institute of Infectious Diseases (USAMRIID) which transitioned from the previous U.S. Army Medical Unit (USAMU) and was renamed in 1969.

As he ended the offensive biological research done at Fort Detrick, Nixon pledged to make former laboratories and land available by the disestablishment of the offensive biological warfare program transferred to the U.S Department of Health and Human Services during the 1970s and later. The Frederick National Cancer Research and Development Center (now the Frederick National Laboratory for Cancer Research) was established in 1971 on a 69-acre (28 ha) parcel in Area A ceded by the installation.

In 1989 base researchers identified the Ebola virus in a monkey imported to the area from the Philippines.

==== Post-Cold War (1990–present) ====
In 1990, Hazelton Research Products' Reston Quarantine Unit in Reston, Virginia suffered a mysterious outbreak of fatal illness among a shipment of crab-eating macaque monkeys imported from the Philippines. The company's veterinary pathologist sent tissue samples from dead animals to the United States Army Medical Research Institute of Infectious Diseases (USAMRIID) at Fort Detrick, where a laboratory test known as an ELISA assay showed antibodies to Ebola virus. Thereafter, a team from USAMRIID euthanized the surviving monkeys, bringing the carcasses to Ft. Detrick for study by the veterinary pathologists and virologists, and eventual disposal under safe conditions. The Philippines and the United States had no previous cases of Ebola infection, and upon further study researchers concluded it was another strain of Ebola, or a new filovirus of Asian origin, which they named Reston ebolavirus (REBOV) after the location of the incident.

In 2009, author H. P. Albarelli published the book A Terrible Mistake: The Murder of Frank Olson and the CIA's Secret Cold War Experiments about Frank Olson's death and the experiments conducted at Fort Detrick. The book is based on documents released under FOIA and numerous other documents and interviews to the police and investigators.

In the 1980s and 1990s, KGB disinformation agent Jakob Segal claimed that Fort Detrick was the site where the United States government "invented" HIV.

USAMRIID had been the principal consultant to the FBI on scientific aspects of the 2001 Anthrax Attacks, which had infected 22 people and killed five. While assisting with the science from the beginning, it also soon became the focus of the FBI's investigation of possible perpetrators (see Steven Hatfill). In July 2008, a top U.S. biodefense researcher at USAMRIID committed suicide just as the FBI was about to lay charges relating to the incidents. The scientist, Bruce Edwards Ivins, who had worked for 18 years at USAMRIID, had been told about the impending prosecution. The FBI's identification of Ivins in August 2008 as the Anthrax Attack perpetrator remains controversial and several independent government investigations which will address his culpability are ongoing. Although the anthrax preparations used in the attacks were of different grades, all of the material derived from the same bacterial strain. Known as the Ames strain, it was first researched at USAMRIID. The Ames strain was subsequently distributed to at least fifteen bio-research labs within the U.S. and six locations overseas.

In June 2008 the Environmental Protection Agency said it planned to add the base to the Superfund list of the most polluted places in the country. On 9 April 2009, "Fort Detrick Area B Ground Water" was added to the list which currently includes 18 other sites within Maryland.

The Forest Glen Annex of the Walter Reed Army Medical Center in Silver Spring, Maryland was transferred to the command of Fort Detrick in 2008 as a result of the Base Realignment and Closure process.

As of 2008 about 7,900 people worked at Fort Detrick. The base has been the largest employer in Frederick County and contributed more than $500 million into the local economy annually.

In 2020, a conspiracy theory regarding COVID-19 arose that alleged that the SARS-CoV-2 virus was developed by the United States Army at Fort Detrick. This allegation has been promoted by Chinese government officials, most notably Ministry of Foreign Affairs spokesman Zhao Lijian, who has called for an inspection of the facility, although the allegation remains baseless. A petition organized by the Chinese Communist Party-owned tabloid Global Times urging the WHO to investigate Fort Detrick for COVID origins reportedly amassed 25 million signatures.

== Environmental contamination ==
Fort Detrick Area B is a 399-acre proving ground and was a disposal area for chemical, biological, and radiological material until 1970. In 2009, it was listed as a superfund site on the National Priorities List with four so-called "source areas": chemical waste disposal pits, a landfill, the Area B-Grid and the Area B-20 South burn area. There are 30 additional possible areas. Groundwater has been known to be contaminated with volatile organic compounds trichloroethylene (TCE) since 1992, as well as tetrachloroethene, both onsite and offsite. Eight 55-gallon drums of TCE buried in Area B in 1968 are believed to be one source of the contamination. Groundwater plume modeling is difficult due to underlying karst formations. No "Records of Decision" about how each site will be remediated have been signed by EPA and Army.

In 2012, the United States National Research Council published a report after reviewing two investigations of potential health hazards at Fort Detrick: a 2009 public health assessment conducted by the Agency for Toxic Substances and Disease Registry and a cancer investigation in Frederick County by the Maryland Department of Health and Mental Hygiene and the Frederick County Health Department. The report found neither study could show whether people were harmed by contaminated groundwater from Area B. It is unlikely that additional studies could establish a link, because no data on early exposures were collected and data cannot be obtained or reliably estimated now.

In May 2014, a developer who had bought 92 acres near the Center for Biological Research sued the U.S. Army for negligence in its chemical disposal practices, which led to levels of TCE of up to 42 times the federal maximum contaminant level. A U.S. attorney representing Fort Detrick argued in July 2014 that nonexistent EPA regulation at the time is an exception to the Federal Tort Claims Act and "protects the Army's waste disposal practices". The $37 million lawsuit was dismissed in January 2015.

After the Army denied claims of health problems in 106 Frederick families and individuals in February 2015, the residents filed a class action lawsuit, seeking $750 million for wrongful death and pain and suffering in August 2015.

The installation's Restoration Advisory Board has released a report on some of the findings in relation to the spillage of waste. The public Fort Detrick website provided a copy of the archive from the meeting of an environmental committee.

== 2019 closure and resumption of operations ==
During an inspection by the Centers for Disease Control and Prevention (CDC) of the United States Army Medical Research Institute of Infectious Diseases (USAMRIID) BSL-3 and BSL-4 laboratories at Ft Detrick in June 2019, six violations including two breaches of containment were identified. The inspection was followed up by a letter of concern from the CDC on July 12, 2019 and then a cease and desist order on July 15, 2019.

Following the cease and desist order from the CDC the USAMRIID laboratories at the base were shut down in August 2019. The announcement to resume operations on a "limited scale" was made on November 25, 2019.

The CDC cited "national security reasons" as the reason for not informing the public about its decision. The two breaches reported to the CDC by USAMRIID staff demonstrated failures of biosafety level 3 and 4 protocols in the Army laboratory to "implement and maintain containment procedures sufficient to contain select agents or toxins".

After approximately eight months of closure and restrictions, the USAMRIID BSL-4 lab had been authorized to resume full operational status by April 2020, to the applause of Maryland lawmakers including Senator Ben Cardin, who stated "it is a relief to have USAMRIID fully operational with the current COVID-19 outbreak"'.

== Tenant units and organizations ==
Each branch of the U.S. military is represented among Fort Detrick's 7,800 military, federal and contractor employees. Four cabinet-level agencies are represented by activities on the garrison: The U.S. Department of Homeland Security, the U.S. Department of Agriculture, the U.S. Department of Health and Human Services, and the U.S. Department of Defense. The offices and laboratories include the Agriculture Department's Foreign Disease and Weed Science Research Institute, the National Cancer Institute, the Naval Medical Logistics Command and the Telemedicine and Advanced Technology Research Center. Currently under construction is a biotechnology campus that will house civilian and military research centers including units of the Centers for Disease Control and Prevention (CDC), the National Institute of Allergy and Infectious Diseases (NIAID), as well as USAMRIID.

The following units and organizations (military and otherwise) are located on the Fort Detrick installation:

U.S. Department of Defense

- U.S. Army Medical Research and Development Command (USAMRDC)
  - U.S. Army Medical Materiel Agency (USAMMA)
  - U.S. Army Medical Materiel Development Activity (USAMMDA)
  - U.S. Army Medical Research Acquisition Activity (USAMRAA)
  - U.S. Army Medical Research Institute of Infectious Diseases (USAMRIID)
  - Telemedicine and Advanced Technology Research Center (TATRC)
  - U.S. Army Center for Environmental Health Research (USACEHR; currently part of USAMRICD)
- 114th Signal Battalion
- 21st Signal Brigade
- 302nd Signal Battalion
- 6th Medical Logistics Management Center (6MLMC)
- Company A, 53rd Signal Battalion (SATCON)
- Air Force Medical Logistics Office (AFMLO)
- Air Force Medical Support Agency, Global Medical Support Training and Exercises (AFMSA/SGPX)
- National Center for Medical Intelligence (NCMI), formerly the Armed Forces Medical Intelligence Center (AFMIC)
- Chemical Biological Medical Systems (CBMS), Joint Project Management Office
- Company B, 4th Light Armored Reconnaissance Battalion, 4th Marine Division Marine Forces Reserve
- Defense Contract Management Agency, DCMA Baltimore
- Detachment 1, 301st Signal Company (Cable & Wire)
- Joint Medical Logistics Functional Development Center (JMLFDC)
- Joint Readiness Clinical Advisory Board (JRCAB)
- Medical Communications for Combat Casualty Care (MC4)
- Naval Medical Logistics Command (NMLC)
- Technology Applications Office (TAO)
- U.S. Army Information Systems Engineering Command, Fort Detrick Engineering Directorate

In addition, Fort Detrick is the support facility for the Raven Rock Mountain Complex.

U.S. Department of Health and Human Services

- The National Cancer Institute campus at Frederick (NCI Frederick)
- Frederick National Laboratory for Cancer Research

U.S. Department of Agriculture

- Foreign Disease Weed Science Research Unit

U.S. Department of Homeland Security

- National Bioforensic Analysis Center (NBFAC)
- National Biodefense Analysis and Countermeasures Center (NBACC)

== On post historic sites ==
Fort Detrick has three sites (and four structures) on the National Register of Historic Places:

- The Nallin Farm House (circa 1835)
- The Nallin Farm Springhouse and Bank Barn (pre-1798)
- The One Million Liter Sphere, the "Eight Ball" (1947–48)

In addition, the following sites on the installation are of historic interest:

- A rocky knoll overlooking Frederick, and located near the Old Farm Gate (northwest gate) of Fort Detrick, was the site of historic structures. The Novitiate Academy of Frederick built an impressive estate, Saint Joseph's Villa, on the hill in 1895. This was located there because of Restoration Spring just to the north at the base of the hill. The Academy moved to New York in 1903 and the Villa was subsequently demolished. Dr. Rudolph Rau, a Frederick surgeon, bought the land in 1911 and constructed an imposing white mansion with colossal columns, a third-floor ballroom and carriage house. This estate, "Wide Pastures", also included an extensive Italianate woodland and terraced garden. This property was sold in 1929 to Robert Bright who used it as a summerhouse until 1943. Three years later, the U.S. government bought it and it was used as the Fort Detrick post commander's residence until it too was demolished in 1977. Today, only retaining walls and some flagstone paths remain, but photos of both the Novitiate Academy building and Dr. Rau's mansion can be seen as part of interpretive signage at the site.
- Building 470, a pilot plant known as "Anthrax Tower" (1953; demolished in 2003)

== See also ==
- Deseret Test Center
- Fort Terry
- Human experimentation in the United States
- MKNAOMI
- Operation Paperclip
- Plum Island Animal Disease Center
- Porton Down
- Kurt Blome
- William C. Patrick III, veteran bioweaponeer
- Erich Traub
- Allegations of biological warfare in the Korean War
- STARCOM (communications system), the East Coast Relay station at Fort Detrick
