= United States Army Medical Research Institute of Infectious Diseases =

U.S. Army counter-biological warfare research institution

- The USAMRIID logo
- Active: 1969–present
- Country: United States of America
- Branch: United States Army
- Type: Medical R&D Command
- Role: Medical research and development
- Part of: United States biological defense program
- Garrison/HQ: Fort Detrick, Maryland, United States; 39°26′17″N 77°25′24″W
- Motto: "Biodefense Solutions to Protect Our Nation"
- Website: usamriid.health.mil

Commanders
- Commander: Colonel Tracy J. Ostrom
- Senior Enlisted Leader: SGM Todd J. Brenecki

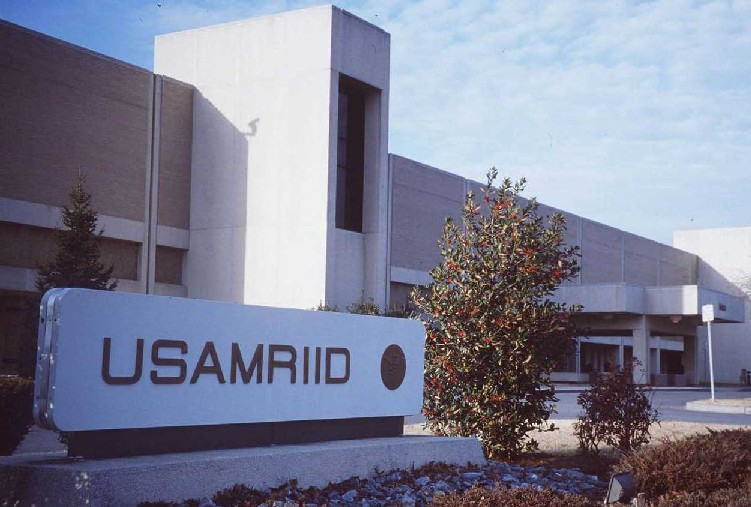
The Dan Crozier Building, at USAMRIID, Fort Detrick, Maryland.

The United States Army Medical Research Institute of Infectious Diseases (USAMRIID; /juːˈsæmrɪd/) is the United States Army's main institution and facility for defensive research into countermeasures against biological warfare. It is located on Fort Detrick, Maryland, near Washington, D.C., and is a subordinate lab of the United States Army Medical Research and Development Command (USAMRDC), headquartered on the same installation.

USAMRIID is the only laboratory of the United States Department of Defense (DoD) equipped to study highly hazardous viruses at Biosafety Level 4 within positive pressure personnel suits.

USAMRIID employs both military and civilian scientists as well as highly specialized support personnel, totaling around 800 people. In the 1950s and 1960s, USAMRIID and its predecessor unit pioneered unique, state-of-the-art biocontainment facilities which it continues to maintain and upgrade. Investigators at its facilities frequently collaborate with the Centers for Disease Control and Prevention, the World Health Organization, and major biomedical and academic centers worldwide.

USAMRIID was the first bio-facility of its type to research the Ames strain of anthrax, determined through genetic analysis to be the bacterium used in the 2001 anthrax attacks.

== Mission ==
USAMRIID's 1983 mission statement mandated that the Institute:

Develops strategies, products, information, procedures and training for medical defense against biological warfare agents and naturally occurring infectious agents of military importance that require special containment.

USAMRIID's current mission statement is:

To protect the Warfighter from biological threats and to be prepared to investigate disease outbreaks or threats to public health.

=== National and international legal status ===
By U.S. Department of Defense (DoD) directive, as well as additional U.S. Army guidance, USAMRIID performs its "biological agent medical defense" research in support of the needs of the three military services. This mission, and all work done at USAMRIID, must remain within the spirit and letter of both President Richard Nixon's 1969 and 1970 Executive Orders renouncing the use of biological and toxin weapons, and the U.N. Biological Weapons Convention of 1972.

== History ==
=== Beginnings ===
USAMRIID traces its institutional lineage to the early 1950s, when Lt. Col. Abram S. Benenson was appointed as medical liaison officer to the U.S. Army Biological Warfare Laboratories (BWL) at Camp (later Fort) Detrick to oversee biomedical defensive problems. Soon thereafter, a joint agreement was signed and studies on medical defense against biological weapons were conducted cooperatively by the U.S. Army Chemical Corps and the Army Medical Department. These early days saw the beginnings of the medical volunteer program known as "Project Whitecoat" (1954–1973). USAMRIID's precursor—the Army Medical Unit (AMU)—began operations in 1956 under the command of Col. William D. Tigertt. (One of the AMU's first responsibilities was to oversee all aspects of Project CD-22, the exposure of volunteers to aerosols containing a highly pathogenic strain of Coxiella burnetii, the causal agent of Q fever.)

In 1961, Col. Dan Crozier assumed command of the AMU. Modern principles of biosafety and biocontainment were pioneered at Fort Detrick throughout the 1960s by a number of scientists led by Arnold G. Wedum. Crozier oversaw the planning and construction of the present USAMRIID laboratory and office building (Building 1425) and its advanced biocontainment suites, which is formally known as "The Crozier Building". Ground breaking came in 1967 (personnel moved in during 1971 and 1972). In 1969, the BWL were formally disestablished and the Institute underwent a formal name change from the AMU to the "U.S. Army Medical Research Institute of Infectious Diseases". The institute's mission did not really change and it received additional funding and personnel authorizations to hire biomedical and laboratory scientists who were losing their jobs as a result of the termination of the United States' offensive BW studies.

=== 1970s ===
By the late 1970s, in addition to the work on Coxiella burnetii and other rickettsiae, research priorities had expanded to include the development of vaccines and therapeutics against Argentine, Korean and Bolivian hemorrhagic fevers, Lassa fever and other exotic diseases that could pose potential BW threats. In 1978, the Institute assisted with humanitarian efforts in Egypt when a severe outbreak of Rift Valley fever (RVF) occurred there for the first time. The epidemic caused thousands of human cases and the deaths of large numbers of livestock. Diagnostics, along with much of the institute's stock of RVF vaccine, were sent to help control the outbreak. At this time the Institute acquired both fixed and transportable BSL-4 containment plastic human isolators for the hospital care and safe transport of patients suffering from highly contagious and potentially lethal exotic infections. In 1978, it established an Aeromedical Isolation Team (AIT)—a military rapid response team of doctors, nurses and medics, with worldwide airlift capability, designed to safely evacuate and manage contagious patients under BSL-4 conditions. A formal agreement was signed with the Centers for Disease Control (CDC) at this time stipulating that USAMRIID would house and treat highly contagious infections in laboratory personnel should any occur. (After deploying on only four "real world" missions in 32 years, the AIT was ultimately decommissioned in 2010.)

=== 1980s ===
The 1980s saw the establishment of a new program to improve the existing anthrax vaccine, and to develop new information on the pathophysiology of weaponized anthrax disease. This came in response to the Sverdlovsk anthrax leak of 1979. Professional medical opinion differed at this period as to exactly what constituted a potential BW agent. A case in point was the establishment in 1980 of a new program focusing on Legionnaires' disease at the urging of some medical authorities. Almost a year later, a panel of experts decided that this organism did not have potential as a BW agent and the program was discontinued. Of greater longevity were the new research programs initiated at this time to study the trichothecene fungal toxins, marine toxins and other small molecular weight toxins of microbial origin.

The early 1980s also saw the development at USAMRIID of new diagnostic methods for several pathogenic organisms such as ELISA technology and the extensive use of monoclonal antibodies. The same year saw introduction of a new course, "Medical Defense Against Biological Agents", designed to familiarize military physicians, nurses and other medical personnel with the special problems potentially posed by medical management BW cases. This course, with some changes in format, continued into the 21st century as the "Medical Management of Chemical and Biological Casualties Course" (MCBC), still conducted jointly by USAMRIID and the U.S. Army Medical Research Institute of Chemical Defense (USAMRICD).

In 1985, General Maxwell R. Thurman, then Army Deputy Chief of Staff, reviewed the threat posed to U.S. servicemembers by biological weapons. Thurman was particularly concerned about the application of genetic engineering technology to alter conventional microorganisms and his review resulted in a five-year plan of expansion for research into medical defensive measures at USAMRIID. The 1985 in-house budget of 34 M USD was to expand to 45 M the next year and was eventually scheduled to reach 93.2 M by 1989. (The need for a physical detection system to identify an aerosol of infectious agent became apparent at this time. The lack of such a reliable system still represents one of the major technical difficulties in the field.) Within two years, however, it became apparent that this program of expansion would not materialize. A new proposed toxin laboratory was never built. The Army had experienced several budget cuts and these impacted the funding of the institute.

By 1988, USAMRIID began to come under close scrutiny by several Congressional committees. The Senate Subcommittee on Oversight of Government Management, chaired by Senator Carl Levin, issued a report quite critical in the DoD's management of biological safety issues in the CBW programs. Senator John Glenn, chairman, Committee on Governmental Affairs asked the Government Accounting Office (GAO) to investigate the validity of DoD's Biological Defense Research Program. The GAO issued a critical report concluding that the Army spent funds on R&D efforts that did not address validated BW threats and may have duplicated the research efforts of the Centers for Disease Control and the National Institutes of Health.

While investigating an outbreak of simian hemorrhagic fever (SHF) in 1989, USAMRIID electron microscopist Thomas Geisbert discovered filoviruses similar in appearance to Ebola in tissue samples taken from a crab-eating macaque imported from the Philippines to a facility operated by Hazleton Laboratories (now Fortrea) in Reston, Virginia. USAMRIID's role in the Reston virus outbreak became the focus of Richard Preston's bestselling 1995 book The Hot Zone.

=== 1990s ===
During the period of Desert Shield and Desert Storm (1990–91) USAMRIID provided the DoD with expert advice and products (vaccines and drugs) to ensure an effective medical response if a medical defense were required. USAMRIID scientists trained and equipped six special laboratory teams for rapid identification of potential BW agents, which fortunately never appeared. Following the conflict, USAMRIID physicians and engineers were key members of a United Nations Special Commission (UNSCOM) Inspection Team that evaluated the BW capabilities in Iraq during the 1990s.

=== 2000s ===
In late 2001, USAMRIID became the FBI's reference lab for forensic evidence related to the bioterror incident known as "Amerithrax" in which anthrax-laden letters were sent through the US Postal Service, killing 5 people and sickening 17 others. The response by USAMRIID as it interacted with the FBI, HHS, DOJ, CIA and the White House is detailed in Richard Preston's 2002 book The Demon in the Freezer.

An inspection by USAMRMC, conducted seven months after the Amerithrax incidents, found that Suite B-3 in Building 1425 at the Institute not only was contaminated with anthrax in three locations but the bacteria had escaped from secure areas in the building to those that were unprotected. The report stated that, "safety procedures at the facility and in individual laboratories were lax and inadequately documented; that safety supervision sometimes was carried out by junior personnel with inadequate training or survey instruments; and that exposures of dangerous bacteria at the lab, including anthrax, had not been adequately reported."

In August 2008, a USAMRIID scientist, Dr. Bruce Ivins, was identified as the lone Amerithrax culprit by the FBI. Ivins had allegedly expressed homicidal thoughts and exhibited mental instability before and after the attacks occurred. He had maintained his security clearance at the institute, and retained access to dangerous substances, until mid-July 2008, at the end of which month he committed suicide. Also in August 2008, Secretary of the Army Pete Geren ordered the creation of a team of medical and military experts to review security measures at the institute. The team is headed by a two-star general, and will include representatives from USAMRMC, the Army's Surgeon General, and Army operations. U.S. Representatives John D. Dingell and Bart Stupak have stated that they will lead investigations into security at the Institute as part of a review of all the nation's biodefense labs.

=== 2010s ===
Safety policies changed at USAMRIID following an incident in March 2010. A young microbiologist became trapped in the -30 freezer portion of 'Little Alaska.' Due to the corroded nature of the freezer door, the woman was trapped in the life-threatening conditions for over 40 minutes. She was eventually recovered and the incident was labelled as a near miss. USAMRIID instituted a mandatory '2 man freezer policy' and worked to keep both the quality of the door and the security in that surrounding area up to a higher standard.

Groundbreaking occurred in August 2009 for a new, state-of-the-art, 835,000 square feet (78,000 m^{2}) facility at Ft Detrick for USAMRIID. The building, being constructed by Manhattan Torcon Joint Venture under the supervision of the US Army Corps of Engineers, was projected for completion and partial occupation by 2015 or '16 and full occupation by 2017. This delay to the project delivery was in part due to a fire within the BSL4 laboratory area.

In August 2019, all research at USAMRIID was indefinitely put on hold after the Centers for Disease Control and Prevention cited the organization for failing to meet biosafety standards. In November 2019, limited research was resumed after infrastructure, training, compliance and biosafety standards had been improved.

== List of USAMRIID commanders ==
COL Dan Crozier, MD	1969	1973
Brig. Gen. Kenneth R. Dirks	1973	
COL Joseph F. Metzger	1973	1977
COL Richard F. Barquist, MD	1977	1983
COL David L. Huxsoll, DVM, PhD	1983	1990
COL Charles L. Bailey, PhD	1990	
COL Ronald G. Williams	1990	1992
COL Ernest T. Takafuji, MD, MPH	1992	1995
COL David R. Franz, DVM	1995	1998
COL Gerald W. Parker, DVM, PhD, MS	1998	2000
COL Edward M. Eitzen Jr, MD, MPH	2000	2002
COL Erik A. Henchal, PhD	2002	2005
COL George W. Korch, PhD	2005	2008
COL John P. Skvorak, DVM, PhD	2008	2011
COL Bernard L. DeKoning, MD, FAAFP	2011	2013
COL Erin P. Edgar, MD	2013	2015
COL Thomas S. Bundt, MA, MHA, MBA, PhD	2015	2017
COL Gary A. Wheeler	2017	2019
COL E. Darrin Cox	2019	2021
COL Constance L. Jenkins	2021	2023
COL Aaron C. Pitney, MD, MSS	2023	2025
COL Tracy S. Ostrom	2025	Current

== Notable USAMRIID scientists ==
- Ayaad Assaad, microbiologist and toxicologist
- Steven Hatfill, physician, pathologist and former Amerithrax suspect
- Lisa Hensley, microbiologist; Ebola and smallpox expert
- Bruce Ivins, microbiologist and vaccinologist; identified by the FBI as the Amerithrax culprit
- Peter Jahrling, a virologist who studied smallpox and ebola
- William C. Patrick III, microbiologist, former bioweaponeer and UNSCOM inspector
- C. J. Peters, physician and virologist made famous by the best-seller The Hot Zone
- Richard O. Spertzel, microbiologist, veterinarian and UNSCOM inspector
- Philip M. Zack, microbiologist

== Periodic USAMRIID training courses ==
- Medical Management of Biological Casualties (MMBC)
- Field Management of Biological Casualties (FCBC)
- Hospital Management—Chemical, Biological, Radiological, Nuclear, Explosive (HM-CBRNE)
- Field Identification of Biological Warfare Threat Agents (FIBWA)
- Biologic Agent Identification and Counter Terrorism Training (BAIT)

== See also ==
- United States biological defense program
- United States Army Medical Research Institute of Chemical Defense
- Walter Reed Army Institute of Research
- National Biodefense Analysis and Countermeasures Center
- Positive pressure personnel suit
- Biological warfare in popular culture
