= National Biodefense Analysis and Countermeasures Center =

U.S. government biodefense research laboratory

Coordinates: 39.4356°N 77.4272°W

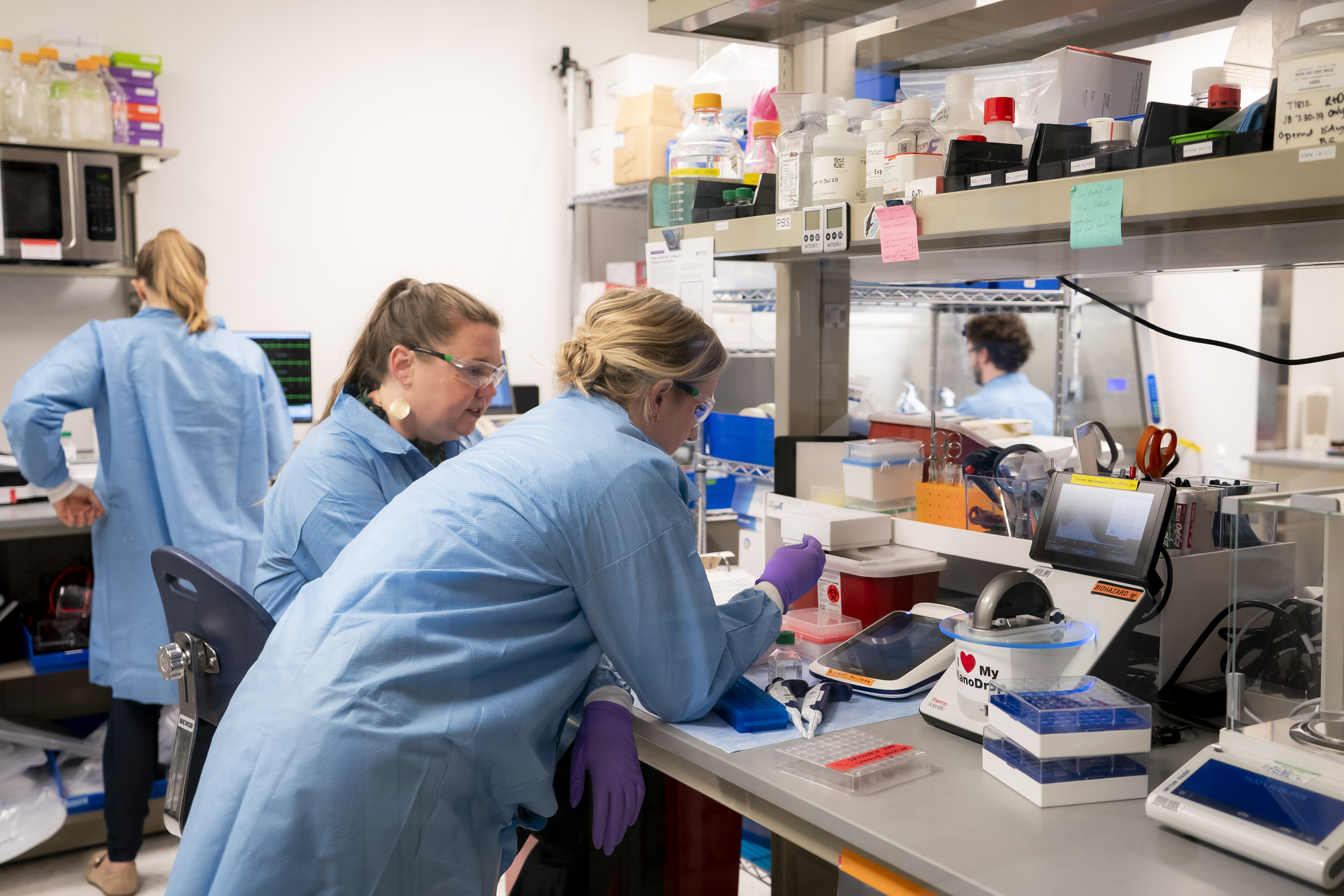

Agency overview
- Formed: 2002; 24 years ago
- Jurisdiction: Federal government of the United States
- Headquarters: Fort Detrick, Frederick, Maryland, United States
- Employees: 190
- Agency executive: Dr. Nicholas Bergman, Director
- Parent agency: United States Department of Homeland Security

The National Biodefense Analysis and Countermeasures Center (NBACC) is a government biodefense research laboratory created by the U.S. Department of Homeland Security (DHS) and located at the sprawling biodefense campus at Fort Detrick in Frederick, Maryland. The NBACC (pronounced EN-back) is the principal U.S. biodefense research institution engaged in laboratory-based threat assessment and bioforensics. The NBACC is an important part of the National Interagency Biodefense Campus (NIBC) also located at Fort Detrick for the U.S. Army, National Institutes of Health and the U.S. Department of Agriculture.

== Background and mission ==
The NBACC was created as a federal response to the 2001 anthrax attacks as the first national laboratory operating under the Department of Homeland Security. The Department of Homeland Security said the mission of the NBACC is "to provide the scientific basis for the characterization of biological threats and bioforensic analysis to support attribution of their planned or actual use." Part of the NBACC's mission is to conduct realistic tests of the pathogens and tactics that might be used in a bioterrorism attack. It seeks to quantitatively answer questions pertaining to what might happen in a biological attack. This work is carried out by about 180 researchers and support staff and has become more advanced since the NBACC became certified to work with biological select agents and toxins in September 2011.

Its work is necessary in the preparation and response to biological threats, which can be handled as they emerge through the NBACC national security biocontainment laboratory. The NBACC is equipped to develop and investigate genetically engineered viruses and bacteria. The NBACC evaluates new and emerging technologies, along with delivery devices that U.S. adversaries might use to disseminate the pathogens.

The NBACC coordinates closely with the many departments and agencies in the U.S. government, including the U.S. intelligence community which has assigned advisers to the Center. The NBACC is involved in a partnership with the National Interagency Confederation for Biological Research at Fort Detrick and initiated the "Work for Others" program, which expands the NBACC's capacity to share information with a variety of related federal agencies.

== Significance of operation ==
In June 2017, Daniel M. Gerstein, senior policy researcher at the RAND Corporation and former acting Under Secretary and Deputy Under Secretary of the DHS's Science and Technology Directorate, said, "In the last 40 to 60 years, hundreds of new diseases have cropped up across the world ... The country and the world have not proven ready to handle a true public health crisis." Describing the NBACC's value to science, Gerstein said, "Back in 2001, we did not have this facility, and it literally took months in order to do the forensics analysis of samples ... they had to outsource ... to 12 different facilities to get everything analyzed back then. Today, the NBACC can do those forensic analyses in a couple days."

The risk of a bioterrorism attack continues to grow. International terrorist organizations, such as ISIS, have shown growing desire to access and use biological weapons. A 19-page document providing instructions on the creation of biological weapons was discovered on a laptop obtained from ISIS in 2014. Kenyan authorities stopped an ISIS-affiliated anthrax plot in late 2016. In early 2017, South Korea speculated that North Korea was developing biological weapons that could be dispersed through drones. The NBACC and affiliated groups play an important role in protecting the public from these mounting threats.

NBACC has already proven capable of responding to these types of threats, as an important actor in the United States response to the Ebola Outbreak of 2014. During the crisis, NBACC scientists carried out experiments to test the duration of the virus' activity when placed on different surfaces, and best practices for sanitation after completing tests.

== Threats to continued work ==
Under President Trump's budget proposal for fiscal year 2018, the NBACC stands to lose funding that allows it to continue scientific studies. The NBACC is faced with the threat of complete shutdown of its facilities by September 2018. Daniel M. Gerstein said the result of the closure of the NBACC would be a "potentially devastating public health concern."

The cost of replacing the services provided by the NBACC will be more expensive than continuing its operations simply due to the nature of changing the role of the NBACC's facilities, according to Homeland Preparedness News.

Congressman John Delaney (D-MD), who represents the Maryland congressional district in which the NBACC resides, said in a statement from May 2017:

I am 100 percent opposed to the closing of the National Biodefense Analysis and Countermeasures Center in Frederick and will fight this deeply misguided move by the Trump Administration ... The National Biodefense Analysis and Countermeasures Center is a unique facility that is crucial to our homeland security, intelligence, and anti-terrorism endeavors. This is the lab that protects us against anthrax attacks, ricin attacks and other bioterrorism threats.

In May 2017, several faculty at the Johns Hopkins Center for Health Security, said the loss of the NBACC would make the impact of a bioterror attack "far more dire." They said, "In the first moments after the attack is identified, we'd want to know the identity of the pathogen used in the attack, whether it could spread from person to person and what drugs and vaccines would work to treat and protect people. But with ... complete elimination [of the NBACC] ... the delay before these and other facts are known would increase, costing many lives."

In September 2015, the Battelle National Biodefense Institute (which operates the NBACC) was awarded a 10-year contract for operations and management. At the time, Battelle said the contract would be worth $480 million if fully executed. The proposed Trump budget for 2018, though, would see this award retracted, leading to the end of all scientific operations by March 2018.

== Facilities ==
NBACC laboratories operate at the biosafety levels of 2, 3, and 4, providing the optimal level of safety and operational capacity. In particular, the NBACC's biosafety level of 4 allows its facilities to research pathogens that have no existing vaccines or treatment. This makes it one of only seven locations in the United States where this occurs.

In June 2006, construction began on a new $128 million, 160,000 sq ft (15,000 m^{2}) facility inside the Ft. Detrick installation. The facility contains two centers:

- The National Biological Threat Characterization Center (NBTCC), which seeks to identify and prioritize biological threats and our vulnerabilities to those threats through its laboratory threat assessments. It includes biocontainment suites, including air-handling equipment, security controls, and other supporting features. It is classified as a SCIF, or Sensitive Compartmented Information Facility, meaning that while the majority of research that occurs at the lab is unclassified, some research results must remain classified for security purposes.
- The National Bioforensic Analysis Center (NBFAC), a forensic testing center equipped to identify and characterize the possible culprit pathogens after an attack has already occurred.

== Notable accomplishments ==
The NBACC achieved a "Superior" Defense Security Service (DSS) rating in 2012 and 2013 and was recognized for staff volunteerism. It has played a role in over 100 federal law enforcement cases.

The NBTCC has unique national biosafety level 3 and 4 aerobiology capabilities, which are necessary to collect crucial data that is used to develop biodefense plans and responses. In 2013, it provided necessary data, which addressed 10 specific biological agent knowledge gaps, to improve hazard, risk, and threat assessments. The data allowed for significant growth in the credibility of hazard and risk assessment modeling of bioterrorism scenarios for a variety of toxin threat agents, including both bacteria and viruses.

The NBFAC played a role in more than 45 federal law enforcement investigations of biological crimes in 2013 alone. Also in 2013, it activated unique bioforensic laboratories at biosafety level 3 with accreditation for casework operations. Its processes maintain operational capability to study more than 60 high-priority human, animal, and plant pathogens and toxins. Its sequencing methods are imperative to enable new kinds of studies. It played a central role in developing capabilities to investigate genetically modified and de novo synthetic agents (new complex molecules formed from simple molecules).

In January 2018, the Intelligence Advanced Research Projects Activity selected Battelle to create a software platform able to fight the development of synthetic biological threats. Battelle said it would develop the threat assessment platform with collaboration from Ginkgo Bioworks, One Codex and Twist Bioscience. The intended final result is a program that can "merge computational approaches into a software tool that can be applied in real-world scenarios."

== Controversies and responses ==
Questions have been raised by some arms-control and international law experts as to the necessity and advisability of the very high level of security surrounding the NBACC and as to whether it does (or will) place the United States in violation of the 1972 Biological and Toxin Weapons Convention (BWC). The BWC outlawed developing, stockpiling, acquiring or retaining pathogens "of types and in quantities that have no justification" for peaceful purposes.

NBACC's opponents contended that the facility would operate in a "legal gray zone" and skirt the edges of the BWC, which outlaws production of even small amounts of biological weapons. They contend that a high degree of transparency is needed to reassure Americans (and the rest of the world) of the U.S. government's good intentions. In their view, the U.S. government may find it hard in the future to object to other countries testing genetically engineered pathogens and novel delivery systems when they invoke their own national biodefense requirements.

The Bush administration contended that the NBACC is purely defensive and thus its operations are fully legal and in accord with the BWC. A principle is that assessing the technical threat of biological pathogens is essential to inform and help develop biodefense policy. Administration officials say that making small amounts of biowarfare pathogens for study is permitted under a broad interpretation of the treaty.

Faculty at the NBACC provided their own responses to help answer questions raised by critics.

In May 2008, director Patrick Fitch said that research at the laboratory is not conducted to "create threats in order to study them." Maureen McCarthy, former Homeland Security director of research and development, said, "All the programs we do are defensive in nature. Our job is to ensure that the civilian population of the country is protected, and that we know what the threats are." Bernard Courtney, the NBACC's former scientific director, described oversight, mentioning that frequent independent reviews over particular experiments occur. These reviews are operated by a group of up to four scientists on a case-by-case scenario.

Additionally, research at the labs is overseen by the Institutional Biosafety Committee. The CDC also conducts inspections to assure labs comply with Select Agents rules. The Final Environmental Impact Statement, or FEIS, for NBACC facilities states that all research is performed for defense purposes and is conducted in a legal manner, including under the BWC.

== See also ==
- Center for Biosecurity, University of Pittsburgh, PA; directed by Tara O'Toole, founded by D.A. Henderson.

== Bibliography ==
- Warrick, Joby, "The Secretive Fight Against Bioterror", The Washington Post; Sunday, July 30, 2006; A01.
- Hernandez, Nelson, "Huge New Biodefense Lab Is Dedicated At Fort Detrick", Washington Post, October 23, 2008; p. B1.
