= George W. Hunter III =

- Occupation: Parasitologist
- Notable work: Hunter's Tropical Medicine (textbook)

George W. Hunter III was a parasitologist and educator with the US Army Sanitary Corps and Army Medical School. He is best known for his work with Schistosoma control and with the Tropical Medicine Course at the Army Medical School (now the course is known as the Walter Reed Tropical Medicine Course). The textbook he helped create for the Tropical Medicine Course now is the leading reference text for Tropical Medicine and the title bears his name.

== Work with the Tropical Medicine Course ==
George W. Hunter III, PhD, was commissioned as a captain in the Sanitary Corps in 1942 and joined the faculty of the Tropical and Military Medicine Course, which expanded from 23 to 200 students. The course prepared medical officers to combat the diseases to which soldiers were exposed in the Army's worldwide operations.

Hunter suggested using the outline of the course as the basis for a textbook. It was published by the National Research Council in 1945 as the Manual of Tropical Medicine and became the standard reference in its field. Hunter's name was not listed first among the principal authors because the company believed that a physician's name would improve sales, but it was retitled Hunter's Tropical Medicine in later editions. With the printing of the sixth edition in 1984, Hunter, then a professor in the School of Medicine, University of California, San Diego, was recognized as "the glue that has held this book together from the very first edition."

== Work with Schistosomiasis and Applied Parasitology ==
Col. George W. Hunter III, MSC, gained international recognition for his work with schistosomiasis. United States forces occupying Japan required food handlers to be free of parasites, and Hunter fielded a mobile laboratory outfitted in railroad cars that tested nearly nineteen thousand Japanese over a four-month period in 1949. The researchers found that 93.2 percent of those tested were infected with some form of intestinal parasite. Demand always creates a supply, and the team also found that there was a black market for parasite-free stools.

One of the parasitic diseases was schistosomiasis, a disabling and potentially fatal disease. Hunter concentrated his research effort on that endemic problem, and by 1951 his team had eliminated it in the Nagatoishi district of Kurume City, Japan, using a landmark program of molluscicides to control the snail host. Japan adopted Hunter's methods and by 1970 had virtually eliminated the disease. Hunter became a public figure in Japan, and in 1952 the townspeople of Kurume erected a bust of him as a permanent tribute to their "great benefactor."

== Legacy ==
- Hunter’s Tropical Medicine: "Hunter’s Tropical Medicine grew out of a World War II Army Medical School tropical and military medicine course taught at the Walter Reed Army Medical Center in Washington, D.C. The first edition, entitled a Manual of Tropical Medicine, was published in 1945 by three of the course instructors, Colonel Thomas T. Mackie, Major George W. Hunter III, and Captain C. Brooke Worth. A second edition was published by the same authors in 1954. Colonel Hunter was joined by co-authors from the Louisiana State University School of Medicine for the third, fourth, and fifth editions, published in 1960, 1966, and 1976, respectively. George Hunter’s contribution was acknowledged by adding his name to the book title in the sixth edition, edited in 1984."

== See also ==
- Walter Reed Tropical Medicine Course
