= Cannabis in Vietnam =

- Location of Vietnam (dark green)
- Medicinal: Illegal
- Recreational: Illegal

Cannabis, whether for recreation or for medical purposes, is illegal in Vietnam. It is placed in the same category as hard drugs such as heroin and cocaine—with the same harsh penalties: imprisonment or death. However, tourists and expatriates living there report that the police may turn a blind eye to recreational smoking if it is done discreetly. Cannabis is both cultivated within the country and smuggled in.

Marijuana, the drug made from the cannabis plant, is known as cần sa in Vietnamese.

== History ==
Cannabis was probably introduced to Southeast Asia around the 16th century, and used medicinally and in cuisine.

In 1968, the government of the Republic of Vietnam "publicly condemned" the use or trafficking of cannabis, and instructed local chiefs to prevent its cultivation. In 1969, USAID's Office of Public Safety (OPS) began eradication of cannabis fields, including aerial eradication in the Mekong Delta. The program was popularly resented and also politically unpalatable; in 1971, OPS was advised not to eradicate cannabis in areas controlled by the Hòa Hảo sect, for fear of driving them to join the Việt Cộng (National Liberation Front).

In the 1960s, the United States government became concerned with cannabis use by American soldiers in Vietnam. Though alcohol was the drug most commonly used by them in the Vietnam War, cannabis was the second-most common. Initially, rates of usage among deployed soldiers were comparable to those of their stateside peers, with 29% of troops departing Vietnam in 1967 reporting having ever used marijuana in their lives. A 1976 study however showed that from 1967 to 1971, the proportion of troops having used marijuana peaked at 34% before stabilizing to 18%, while the number of troops who had used cannabis prior to deployment stayed around 8%.

== Smuggling ==
In 2013, Vietnamese consumers preferred cannabis grown in Canada and the United States, finding it more potent than the locally grown product, and were willing to pay up to ten times more for it. Smuggling is made easier by Vietnamese gangs established in foreign countries due to the Vietnamese diaspora.

== See also ==
- Cannabis in the Vietnam War
