= Building 40 (Army Medical School) =

Coordinates: 38.9750°N 77.0326°W

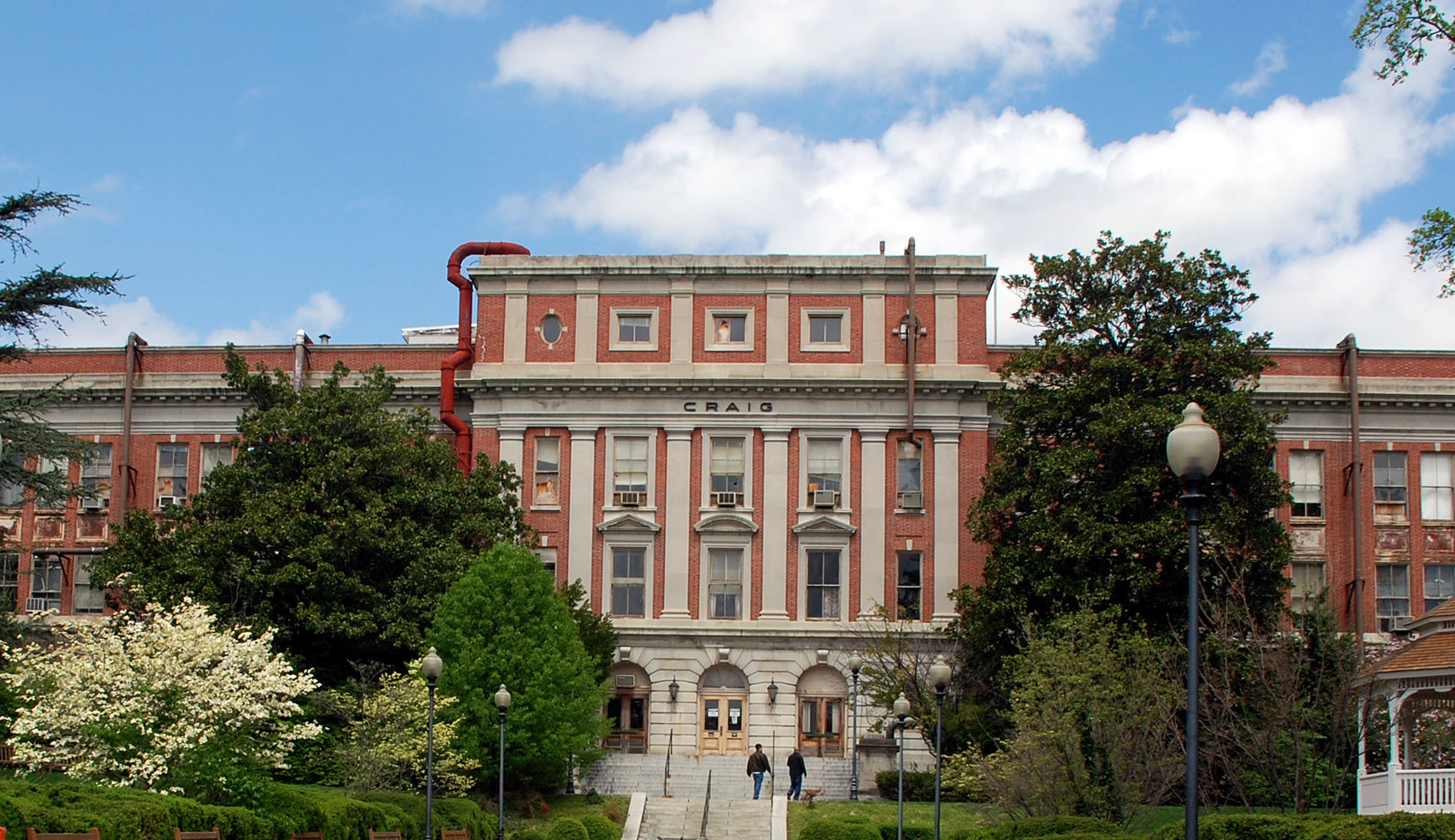
The South, or Craig, Pavilion of Building 40 in 2009

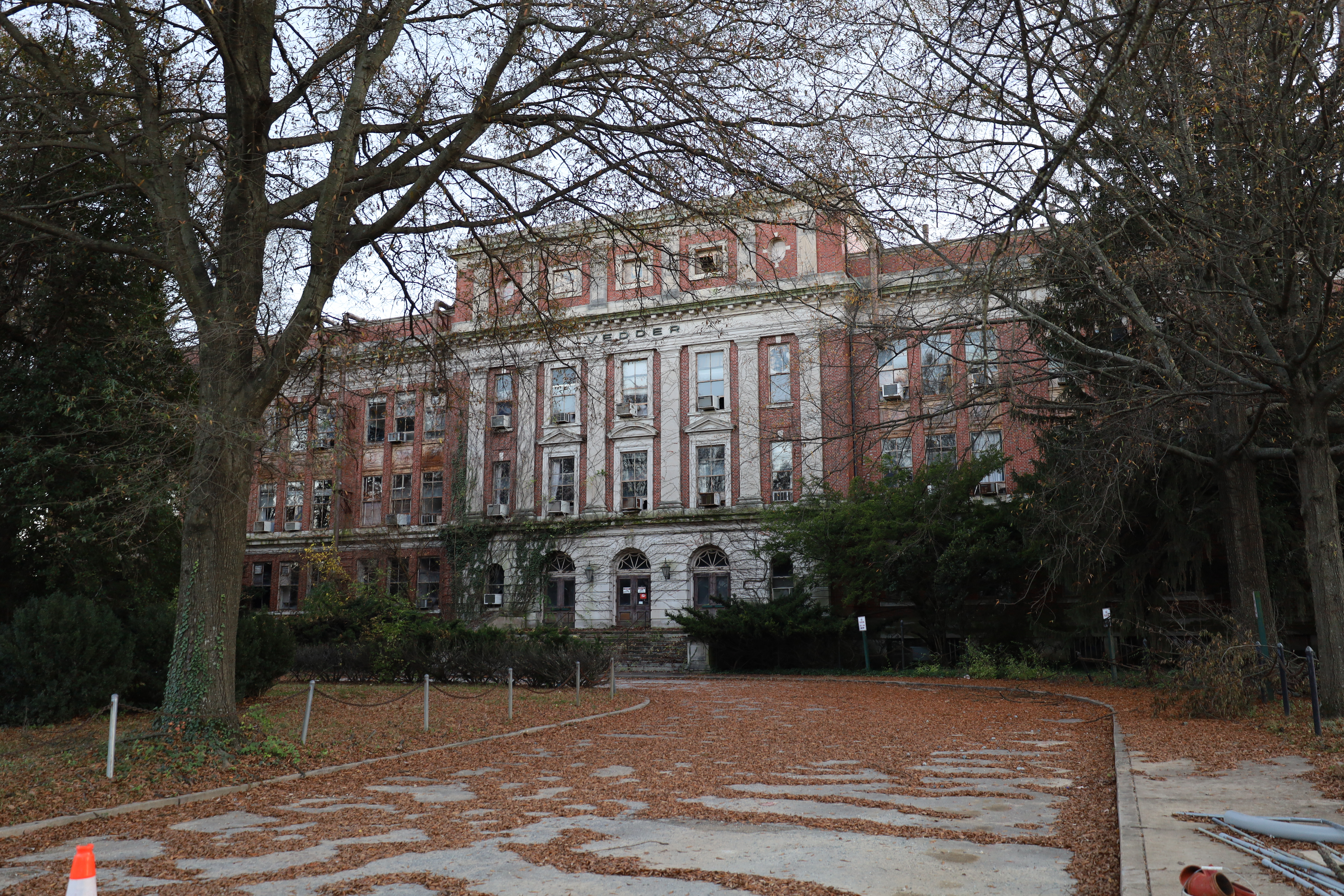
Vedder Pavilion in 2020

Building 40, Army Medical School is a Georgian revival structure in the Walter Reed Army Medical Center complex in northern Washington, D.C., USA. It was built between 1922 and '32 to house the Army Medical School, which became the Army Medical Center in 1923 when it — under the name “Medical Department Professional Service School” (MDPSS) — combined with the Walter Reed General Hospital. The MDPSS ultimately became the Walter Reed Army Institute of Research, which occupied Building 40 from 1953 to '99. It comprises four wings, known as the Craig (1924), Sternberg and Vedder (1932), and Siler (1962) Pavilions and is situated at 14th and Dahlia Streets.

== Structure ==
The original block of Building 40 is designed in a more elaborate version of the Colonial/Georgian-Revival style established in the nearby Walter Reed General Hospital (Building 1). The large, brick, three-story building is embellished with elaborate classical limestone trim at its entrances. The raised basement is stone. The three main floors are brick; rusticated on the first floor and smooth on the second and third, with stone belt courses and a deep projecting dentilled stone cornice. A high parapet surrounds the flat roof. It is a complex brick and limestone structure, consisting of an original H-shaped block and a later addition on the west. The original block appears to have been designed as a unit.

The east elevation was clearly intended to be the principal façade of the original building. The main entrance is located in the center of the crossbar of the H and the end elevations of both projecting wings are elaborately finished. Four pairs of giant order Tuscan engaged columns ornament the monumental pedimented pavilion that houses the main entrance and a large stone cartouche, bearing the caduceus symbol of the U.S. Army Medical Corps, is mounted in the center of the parapet. Today, air conditioners and pipes, probably used for ventilation, protrude from all major elevations. The entire building is now (2009) vacant and in bad condition, with many broken windows and evidence of water damage on the interior.

=== Pavilions ===
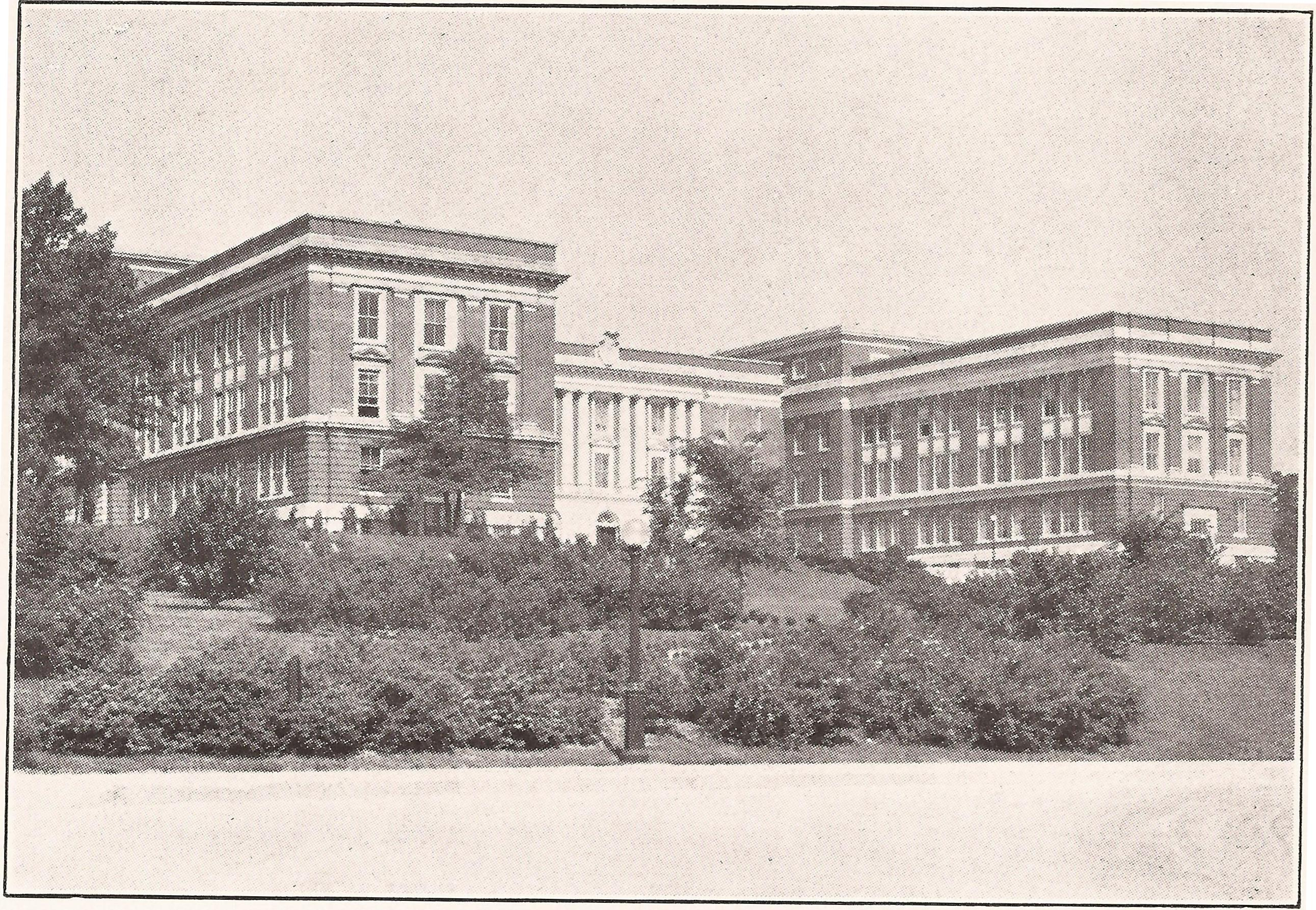
Main (east) entryway to Building 40 in the late 1930s. The Vedder and Craig Pavilions are on the right and left, respectively.

The long north and south pavilions (wings) of the original building are virtually identical. The south (Craig) pavilion was completed in 1924, but work on the parallel north (Vedder) pavilion and the Sternberg crossbar apparently continued until 1932. The addition, the Siler Pavilion, was reportedly built in 1962, but appears much older. The outward-facing front elevation of each wing consists of four bays, each containing groupings of three windows, on either side of a projecting five-bay central pavilion that contains the main entrance. Within each side bay, rectangular stone panels combine the windows on the second and third floor into vertical groupings. On the east ends of the wings, double entrance doors are set within molded stone surrounds and brick pilasters with stone pedestals and caps frame the windows on the second and third floors.

- The North or "Vedder Pavilion" is named for Col. Edward Bright Vedder (1878–1952) who established polished rice extract as the proper treatment for beri-beri;
- The South or "Craig Pavilion" is named for Col. Charles Franklin Craig (1872–1950) who in the Philippines proved (1907; with Percy M. Ashburn) dengue to be a filterable agent (virus) and later showed the mosquito Aedes aegypti responsible for dengue transmission;
- The East or "Sternberg Pavilion" is named for Brig. Gen. George Miller Sternberg (1838–1915), the U.S. Army Surgeon General and co-discoverer of the pneumococcus, known as the "Father of American Bacteriology";
- The West or "Siler Pavilion" is named for Col. Joseph Franklin Siler (1875–1960), who in 1925 first injected dengue virus in serum into humans producing disease and "closing the loop" on dengue transmissibility.

=== Addition ===
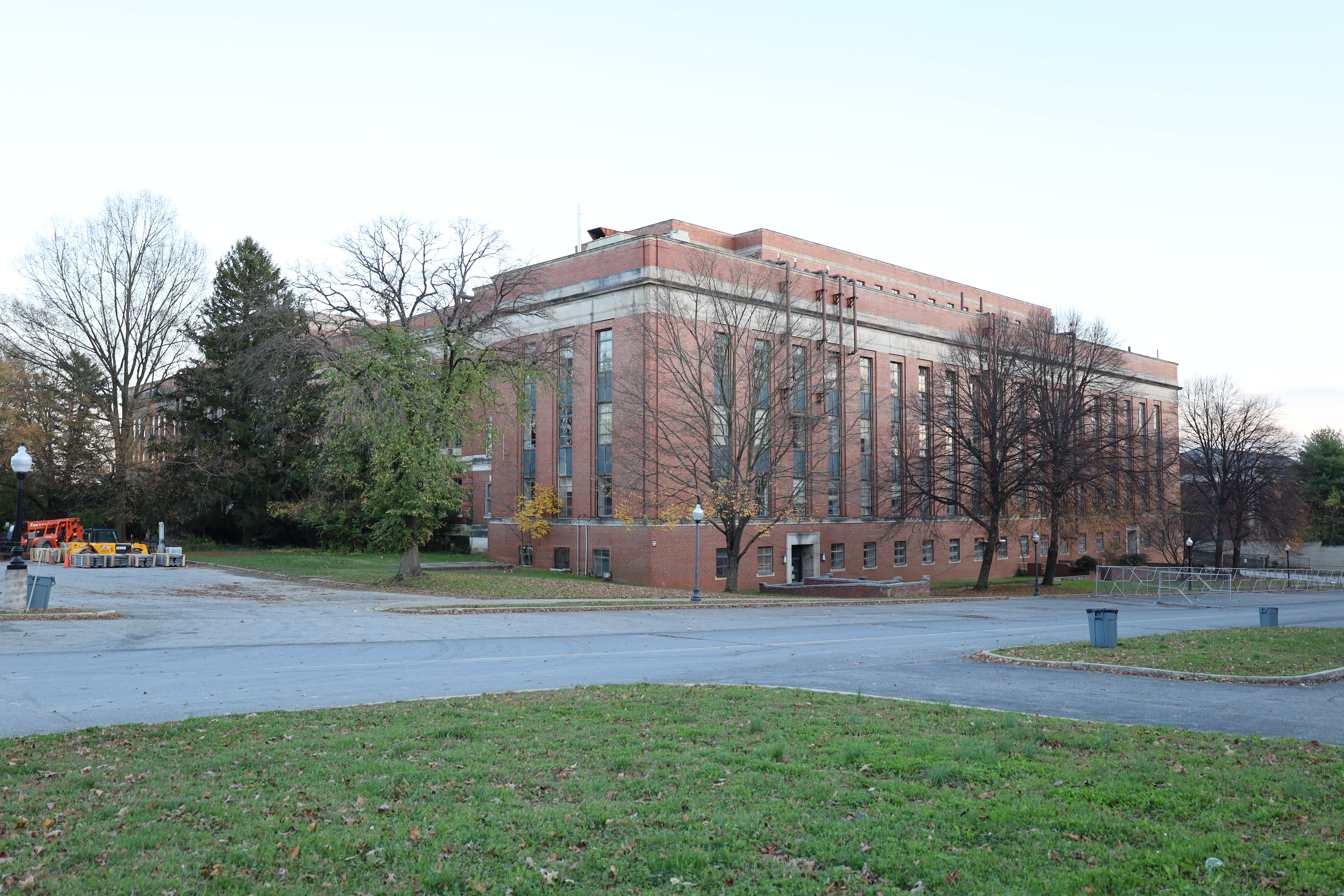
Rear of the building in 2020

An addition covers the entire west elevation of the original block. Because the lot slopes slightly from east to west, this elevation is a full four stories high. The stripped Classical style of the addition was designed to harmonize with the original block. The limestone water table, belt course, and projecting cornice are simplified versions of the ones on the original block. Recessed metal panels tie the eight-pane metal-framed casement windows on the first, second, and third levels into the same kind of vertical grouping found on the original building. There are two simple double entrance doors at the basement level on the west elevation. There is a loading dock in the full-height basement level at the south end of the addition.

== History ==
Building 40 was home to the four successors to the Army Medical School: the Medical Department Professional Service School (1923–1947), the Army Medical Department Research and Graduate School (1947–1950), the Army Medical Service Graduate School (1950–1953), and finally the Walter Reed Army Institute of Research (WRAIR) (1953–1999). During this period, the building served as the principal center for military medical education and biomedical research within the U.S. Army, training generations of military physicians, dentists, veterinarians, nurses, and medical scientists while supporting research on infectious diseases, preventive medicine, pathology, and military health.

The Walter Reed Army Institute of Research, headquartered in Building 40 for nearly five decades, became one of the U.S. military’s premier biomedical research institutions. Scientists working there made significant contributions to vaccine development, malaria research, wound care, infectious disease surveillance, and combat casualty medicine, with research benefiting both military personnel and civilians. In 1999, WRAIR relocated to its present campus in Forest Glen, Maryland, ending more than a century of continuous medical education and research activities in Building 40.

One of the earliest nuclear reactors in the United States, a TRIGA Mark F research reactor, was installed in the basement addition of Building 40 in 1960. Operated under strict safety controls, the reactor was used for medical, biological, and radiological research, including neutron activation analysis and isotope production, rather than electrical power generation. The reactor was permanently shut down in 1979 and later decommissioned under the supervision of the U.S. Nuclear Regulatory Commission.

In 2009, Building 40 was identified as a contributing structure within the proposed Walter Reed Army Medical Center Historic District because of its architectural and historical importance to American military medicine. Although the building is no longer used for its original purpose, it remains one of the most significant surviving structures associated with the development of military medical education and biomedical research in the United States.

== Legacy ==
The large conference room on the second floor of Building 40 was long informally called either the “War Room” or the “Roosevelt Room”. The legend among the WRAIR staff was that in the months before the US entry into World War II, when President Franklin Roosevelt wanted to have military and cabinet meetings away from the eyes of the press and public, he would do so there. For many years before WRAIR’s move to Forest Glen, two celebrated oil paintings by illustrator Dean Cornwell hung in this conference room: Beaumont and St. Martin (1939) and Conquerors of Yellow Fever (1941). (These were part of a series of six much reproduced paintings -- "Pioneers of American Medicine” (1939-1942) -- commissioned by Wyeth-Ayerst Laboratories.)

== Notable people who worked in Building 40 ==
- Maurice Hilleman, famed vaccinologist, Chief of Dept of Respiratory Diseases (1948–57)
- Captain Daniel Carleton Gajdusek, later a Nobel Prize winner (and child molester); assigned to AMSGS (1951–53).

== See also ==
- List of former United States Army medical units
