= Cannabis policy of the Lyndon B. Johnson administration =

Policy related to cannabis of the Johnson administration

During the administration of American President Lyndon B. Johnson (1963–1969), the government made moves to reconsider cannabis law enforcement in the nation, including a more treatment-based approach to drug use. However, Johnson was saddled with controversies regarding the Vietnam War and internal national tensions, and was not able to make major changes to cannabis policy before declining to run for a second term in 1968. During the Johnson administration, cannabis usage was an issue of concern both in the youth counterculture as well as among American troops serving in the Vietnam War.

== Presidency ==
Federal Bureau of Narcotics chief Harry Anslinger, a strong opponent of cannabis since the 1930s, left office in 1962, setting the scene for potential evolution of the national cannabis policy.

In 1966, the Johnson administration passed the Narcotics Addict Rehabilitation Act, treating drug abuse as a medical issue similar to alcoholism. Johnson's 1967 President's Commission on Law Enforcement and Administration of Justice concluded that the Marihuana Tax Act of 1937 was ineffective, and over-broad in lumping cannabis use in with the more dangerous use of opiates. Johnson himself considered the possibility of easing cannabis regulations by removing the mandatory minimum sentencing for cannabis possession.

Throughout Johnson's administration, cannabis use rose sharply, with arrests increasing from 18,815 in 1965 to 61,843 in 1967. In response to the increasing usage of cannabis and other drugs, in 1968 Johnson placed the Federal Bureau of Narcotics (Treasury) and the Bureau of Drug Abuse Control (Food and Drug Administration) under the control of the Department of Justice, consolidating them as the Bureau of Narcotics and Dangerous Drugs.
