= Roger Brooke =

American surgeon

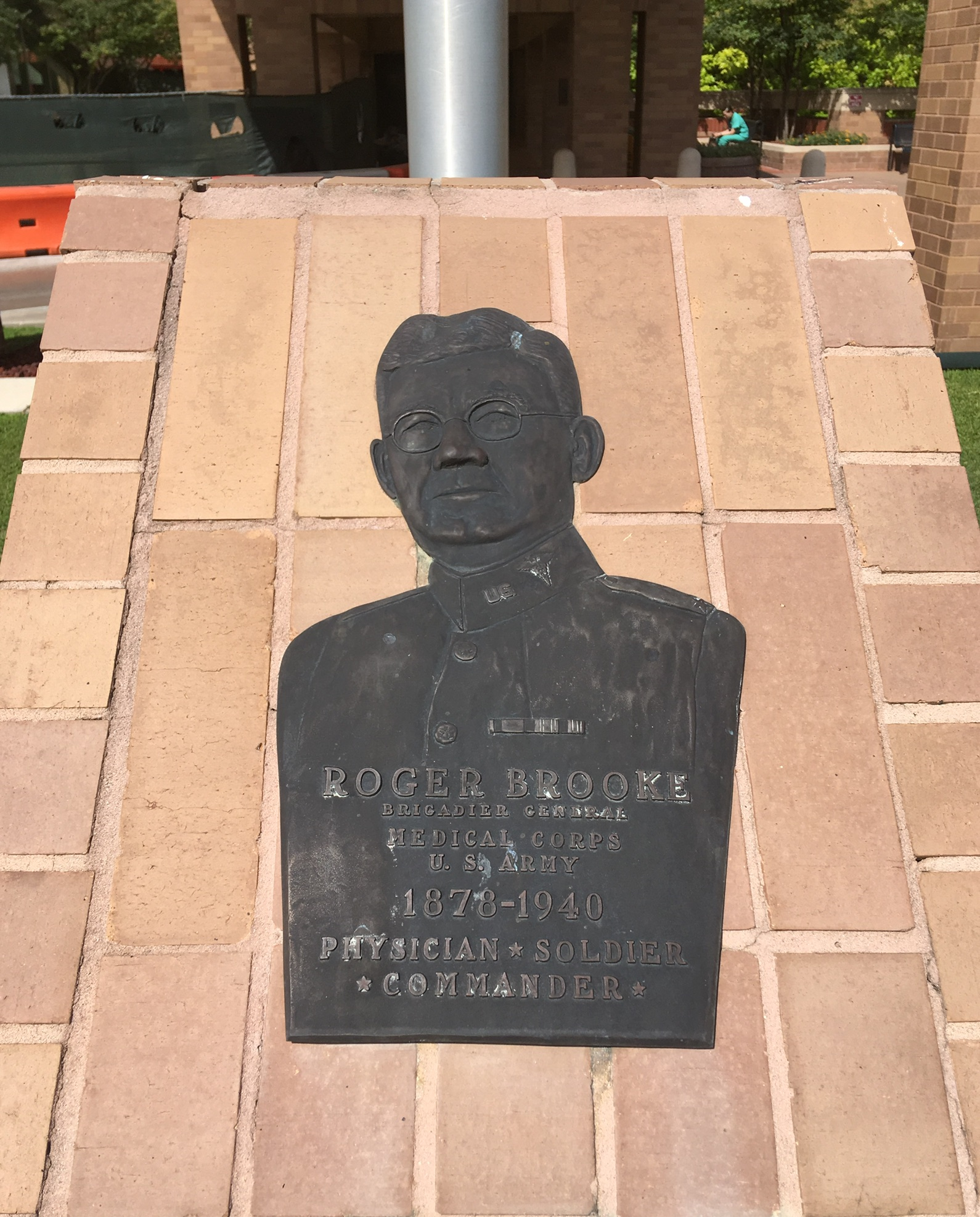
Monument to Brigadier General Roger Brooke near the Entrance of Brooke Army Medical Center.

Brigadier General Roger Brooke (June 14, 1878 in Sandy Springs, Maryland – December 18, 1940) was an American surgeon and U.S. Army medical corps officer. Brooke Army Medical Center in San Antonio, Texas, is named after him.

== Biography ==
Brooke was the son of Roger and Louisa (Thomas) Brooke in a Quaker community. He attended George School in Newton, Pennsylvania, and later entered the University of Maryland Medical School in Baltimore, where he graduated in 1900. He joined the Medical Corps, United States Army, June 29, 1901, as a First Lieutenant. After graduating from the Army Medical School in 1902, he was assigned to the Philippine Islands for a tour of duty. He married Grace Ward McConnor in 1905 and became a specialist in infectious diseases, especially tuberculosis.

Other tours of duty included Fort Bayard, New Mexico, Fort Leavenworth, Kansas, and Attending Surgeon in Washington, D.C. He spent the period of the World War in instruction work, serving from September 1917 to December 1918, first as Senior Instructor and later as Commanding Officer of the Medical Officers' Training Camp, Camp Greenleaf, Georgia, where 10,000 officers and 70,000 enlisted men were prepared for service with the armed forces. For this he was awarded the Distinguished Service Medal.

Later tours of duty included the office of the Surgeon General, Washington and the Division of Medicine of the Veterans Bureau, Gorgas Hospital, Canal Zone. In 1929, Brooke assumed command of the Station Hospital, Fort Sam Houston, San Antonio, Texas, a position he held until 1933. He is credited with instituting the first routine chest X-ray in military medicine. In 1935 Brooke was ordered to Washington in charge of the Professional Service Division. His next tour was at Letterman General Hospital, San Francisco, where he was in command when he received his promotion to brigadier general (January 29, 1938). He was transferred to the Medical Field Service School, Carlisle Barracks, Pennsylvania, where he remained on duty as commandant until his death in 1940.

== Accolades ==
- Fellow, American College of Surgeons
- Fellow, American College of Physicians
- Member, American Medical Association
- Member, American Society of Tropical Medicine
- Member, National Tuberculosis Association
- Member, Association of Military Surgeons
- On September 4, 1942, the Station Hospital was renamed Brooke General Hospital in Brooke's honor. In 1946 the facility was expanded to become Brooke Army Medical Center.
