= Jay P. Sanford =

American physician (1928–1996)

- Jay Philip Sanford
- Born: Jay Philip Sanford; May 27, 1928; Madison, Wisconsin, U.S.
- Died: October 23, 1996 (aged 68) (Lymphoma)
- Resting place: Arlington National Cemetery, Arlington, Virginia, U.S. (Section 6, Site 8391-B)
- Education: University of Michigan (MD); Harvard Medical School (Residency); Duke University Hospital (Fellowship)
- Occupation: Military physician
- Known for: Infectious Diseases; Authoring The Sanford Guide to Antimicrobial Therapy
- Title: Founding Dean and President, USUHS; President, IDSA
- Spouse: Lorrie Sanford (m. 1950–1996)
- Children: 5
- Awards: Médaille d'Honneur du Service de Santé des Armées (France)
- Military career
- Allegiance: United States
- Branch: U.S. Army Reserve; Army Medical Corps
- Rank: Colonel
- Unit: 11th Special Forces Group (Airborne)
- Commands: Chief of Bacteriology Section, Walter Reed Army Institute of Research

Jay Philip Sanford (May 27, 1928, Madison, Wisconsin—October 23, 1996) was a noted American military physician and infectious disease specialist. He held a chair in Tropical Medicine and was author of The Sanford Guide to Antimicrobial Therapy. From 1975 until 1990, he was dean, then president, of the Uniformed Services University of the Health Sciences in Bethesda, Maryland. He received numerous lifetime honors, awards, and accolades.

== Biography ==
Sanford attended the University of Michigan and graduated with honors from the University of Michigan Medical School. He trained in internal medicine at Peter Bent Brigham Hospital in Boston, Harvard Medical School, and Duke University Medical Center. Sanford served two years in military service at the Walter Reed Army Institute of Research, where he was chief of the Bacteriology Section in the Department of Experimental Surgery. Sanford's career in infectious diseases began in Dallas in 1957, when he joined the faculty of the newly established University of Texas Southwestern Medical School at Parkland Hospital. While there he served as chief of the Infectious Diseases Division, director of the Diagnostic Microbiology Laboratory, and vice-chairman of the Department of Medicine.

In 1970, following his presentation at Grand Rounds on newer antibiotics, Sanford conceived the idea that doctors everywhere needed a practical guide to antibiotic use. He then led his fellows and faculty in a brain storming session on what should be included in this guide. The result was The Sanford Guide to Antimicrobial Therapy. Over the years Sanford and his family published the Guide, which is in its 55th edition and used by health care professionals worldwide. His expertise in infectious diseases and his leadership skills brought him to the forefront of many national organizations. Sanford served as councilor, secretary and then president of the Infectious Diseases Society of America (1966 to 1979.) He also served as chairman of the Accreditation Council on Graduate Medical Education, chairman of the American Board of Internal Medicine, and chairman of the ABIM's Subspecialty Committee on Infectious Diseases. In 1968 he was president of the American Federation for Clinical Research, now known as the American Federation for Medical Research (AFMR).

He also held leadership positions at the National Institutes of Health, the Centers for Disease Control and Prevention, the Food and Drug Administration, the National Library of Medicine, the National Science Foundation, the Institute of Medicine, the American College of Physicians, the Association of American Medical Colleges and the Society of Medical Consultants to the Armed Forces. He served on many editorial boards, authored or coauthored 166 publications, wrote 18 editorials, book reviews, and volumes, and published 23 textbook chapters.

From 1975 until 1990, Sanford was dean and then president of the Uniformed Services University of the Health Sciences in Bethesda, Maryland. A military medical school had been a dream of his and during his time at the helm, he saw 2,000 military doctors graduate.

Sanford was in the Army Reserves all his life, and at the time of his death in 1996 he held the rank of colonel. He was assigned to an airborne Special Forces group, and as long as his health permitted continued to jump from airplanes. In 1992, the French government awarded Sanford the Médaille d'Honneur du Service de Santé des Armées for his contributions to military medicine in France. He was the first American to receive this honor.

== Legacy ==
- The Sanford Auditorium at USUHS
- The Sanford Guide

== See also ==
- The Walter Reed Tropical Medicine Course, Sanford was one of the first recipients of the "Colonel George W. Hunter III Certificate"
- Accreditation Council on Graduate Medical Education, Sanford was a chairman
- American Board of Internal Medicine, Sanford was a chairman
- American Federation for Medical Research (AFMR), Sanford was a president
- Uniformed Services University of the Health Sciences, Sanford was dean and then president
