= Edward Bright Vedder =

U.S. Army physician

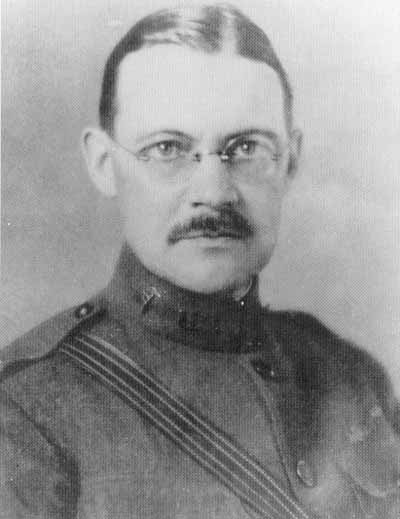
- Born: June 28, 1878; New York City, US
- Died: January 30, 1952 (aged 73)
- Scientific career
- Fields: Military medicine Nutrition
- Workplaces: U.S. Army Medical Corps; Army Medical School (Army Medical Center); Southern Department Laboratory; Edgewood Arsenal; George Washington University; Alameda County Hospital; Highland County Hospital (Oakland)

Edward Bright Vedder (June 28, 1878 – January 30, 1952) was a U.S. Army physician, a noted researcher on deficiency diseases, and a medical educator. He studied beriberi, a deficiency disease affecting the peripheral nerves, and established an extract of rice bran as its proper treatment.

== Early life and education ==
Vedder was born in New York City to Henry Clay Vedder, a professor of church history, and Minnie Lingham Vedder. He was educated at the University of Rochester (Ph.B., 1898) and the University of Pennsylvania (M.D., 1902 and M.S., 1903). At Penn he did research on dysentery with Simon Flexner.

== Career ==
In 1903, he was commissioned an officer in the U.S. Army Medical Corps, and continued his studies at the Army Medical School (AMS) in Washington, D.C., graduating the following year.

Vedder was deployed to Cotabato, Mindanao in the Philippines, where he saw and studied tropical diseases such as beriberi and scurvy. U.S. Army medical officers were conducting research into the possible causes of beriberi, initially using animal subjects. Vedder became convinced by the work of Christiaan Eijkman and Gerrit Grijns and others that beri-beri was indeed caused by a nutritional deficiency. He enlisted the help of Robert R. Williams of the Bureau of Science in Manila in isolating the "anti-beri-beri factor". In 1911, Vedder and Maj. Weston P. Chamberlain, who had become members of the Tropical Disease Board in 1910, began experimenting with the treatment of infantile beriberi with an extract of rice polishings (or partially milled rice, an alcohol-based extract of rice hulls). Williams set out to isolate the ingredient responsible, but his work was deferred with a career change to chemistry for Bell Telephone Company. Other physicians had already tried feeding the polishings to nursing mothers. Believing the problem to be a poison in the mother's milk, they required that each baby be exclusively bottle-fed until the mother's treatment had been completed. Vedder and Chamberlain cured 15 infants whose mothers had symptoms of beriberi by supplementing each mother's milk with an extract of rice polishings and allowing nursing to continue. In every case, regardless of the seriousness of the baby's condition, the cure was rapid and complete. The experiment demonstrated conclusively that beriberi was a deficiency disease rather than the result of a toxin in the mother's milk. In 1913 Vedder published a seminal book on the subject.

In 1913, Vedder returned to the United States and was appointed assistant professor of pathology at the Army Medical School in Washington D.C. He conducted research on scurvy that helped lead others to the discovery that ascorbic acid is a vitamin. He discovered that emetine, the active ingredient of the ancient emetic ipecacuanha, is an amoebicide and therefore effective against amoebic dysentery. He also did research on typhoid, leprosy, syphilis, sprue, dysentery, whooping cough, sanitation and public health.

In 1919, Vedder became director of the Southern Department Laboratory at Fort Sam Houston, Texas and later chief of medical research (1922–25) at the Edgewood Arsenal in Maryland.

In 1925, Vedder returned to Manila as senior member of the Army Board for Medical Research. Four years later, he returned to Washington and in the following year assumed command of the AMS (now called the Army Medical Center).

After his retirement from the Army in 1933 he became professor of experimental medicine at George Washington University. In 1942 he was appointed Director of Medical Education at the Alameda County Hospital (California) and laboratory director of the Highland County Hospital (Oakland), posts that he retained until his retirement in 1947.

Vedder is interred at the Arlington National Cemetery in Arlington, Virginia.

== Legacy ==
The North Pavilion of Building 40 on the campus of the Walter Reed Army Medical Center was named the Vedder Pavilion in his honor.

Vedder's papers were donated to the University of Rochester Edward G. Miner Library in 1997 by Martha Vedder Cullinane, the widow of Vedder's son Henry Clay Vedder II.

An essay written by Lt Col Nathan Johnson about the scientific accomplishments of Dr. Vedder won the 2006 AMSUS history of medicine essay award.

== Bibliography ==
- Beriberi, (New York: William Wood and Company, 1913)
- Sanitation for Medical Officers, (Lea & Febiger, 1917)
- Syphilis & Public Health, (Lea & Febiger, 1918)
- The Medical Aspects of Chemical Warfare (1925)
- The Pathology of Beriberi, JAMA 110 (1938), pp. 893–896.
