= C. Brooke Worth =

American naturalist and virologist

Charles Brooke Worth
- Born: September 4, 1908; Coatesville, Pennsylvania
- Died: December 22, 1984
- Occupation: Naturalist
- Notable work: Manual of Tropical Medicine (textbook)

Charles Brooke Worth (September 4, 1908 – December 22, 1984) was an American naturalist and virologist who worked as a professor at Swarthmore College, with the US Army during World War II, and then with the Rockefeller Foundation during the post-war period working on matters of public health and mosquito-borne diseases. He travelled around the world, including countries in Africa and Asia, and was the author of several books, including Manual of Tropical Medicine, A Naturalist in Trinidad, The Nature of Living Things, and Mosquito Safari: A Naturalist In Southern Africa, Of mosquitoes, moths, and mice.

Worth studied at Swarthmore College and then received an MD from the University of Pennsylvania. While at Swarthmore he was an instructor in zoology. During WWII he was assigned to the Army Medical School and was one of the instructors of the Tropical Medicine Course and co-author of the Manual of Tropical Medicine. He researched malaria, viral diseases, vectors, mammalian and avian reservoirs in several countries and published widely on the subject. Worth examined the idea of transovarial transmission of viruses by mosquitoes.

As a Field Staff Member for the Rockefeller Foundation, Dr. C. Brooke Worth went to the South African Institute of Medical Research (SAIMR) in Johannesburg in the 1950s and was able to carry out a remarkable series of field studies in South Africa and Mozambique.

In 1960 he was assigned to the Trinidad lab in Port of Spain, associated with the University of the West Indies. He was married to Mérida Gray, who ran a bookshop in Swarthmore. After returning to the US, he settled on a 63-acre farm at Eldora, Cape May, where he conducted studies on the insects and birds and published about them in his Of Mosquitoes, Moths and Mice (1972). The farm was subsequently made a nature reserve.

== See also ==
- Walter Reed Tropical Medicine Course, founding member and co-author for the Manual of Tropical Medicine
- Rockefeller Foundation
