= William H. Forwood =

Surgeon General of the United States Army (1838–1915)

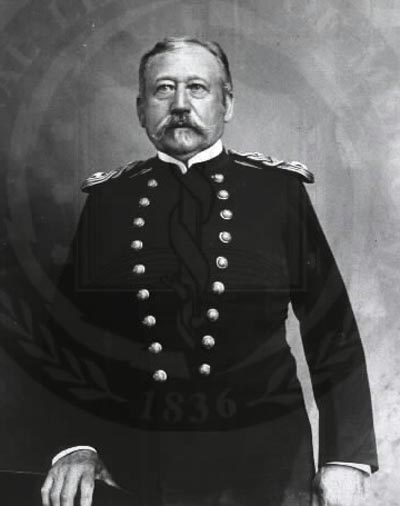
- William H. Forwood
- Born: September 7, 1838; Brandywine Hundred, Delaware
- Died: May 12, 1915 (aged 76); Washington, D.C.
- Burial place: Arlington National Cemetery
- Military career
- Allegiance: United States of America; Union
- Branch: United States Army; Union Army
- Service years: 1861–1902
- Rank: Brigadier General
- Commands: Surgeon General of the United States Army
- Conflicts: American Civil War; Indian Wars

William Henry Forwood (September 7, 1838 – May 12, 1915) was a surgeon from Delaware who served in the Union Army during the American Civil War and eventually as Surgeon General of the United States Army from June 8, 1902 until September 7, 1902.

== Biography ==
=== Early life ===
William Henry Forwood was born in Brandywine Hundred, Delaware on September 7, 1838.

=== During the war ===
Forwood attended Crozier Academy in Chester, Pennsylvania, earned his medical degree from the University of Pennsylvania, and was appointed as an Assistant Surgeon on August 5, 1861. He was assigned to Seminary Hospital in Georgetown, Washington, D.C., where he served initially as the hospital's executive officer, then as regimental surgeon of the 14th U.S. Infantry, and then acting medical director of the V Corps, General George Sykes' unit of the Army of the Potomac, during the Peninsula campaign. He took part in the battles of Yorktown, Williamsburg, Gaines Mill and Malvern Hill before he was reassigned to the office of the Medical Director, Washington, D.C., in October 1862.

In February 1863, Forwood was assigned to the 6th U.S. Cavalry as an assistant surgeon. On May 13, 1863, Forwood was accompanying acting regimental commander George Henry Cram and two enlisted orderlies from General John Buford's headquarters back to their camp when they were captured by a band of Mosby's guerrillas. The group's leader, Lieutenant Fairchild, after securing their horses and equipment, offered to release them if they would give their parole. Cram and the two soldiers did so and were released. Since medical officers on both sides had the right to be released without parole if captured, Forwood refused. Fairchild refused to release him without it and turned him over to a guard detail as a prisoner of war. Forwood escaped into the brush while being marched away and returned to the regiment later that evening. This was quite an embarrassing incident for Captain Cram, and might be the reason Forwood spent the rest of the month on detached service at the Cavalry Corps' dismount camp near Dumfries, Virginia. He returned to the regiment before the Battle of Brandy Station.

During the Gettysburg campaign, Forwood was captured again. He was left in charge of the regiment's wounded following the battle of Fairfield, among whose numbers was the other assistant surgeon, William H. Notson. This time, he was released without incident, however, and rejoined his regiment for the remainder of the campaign.

On October 11, 1863, the 6th U.S. Cavalry was caught in an exposed position near Brandy Station and engaged by superior numbers of Confederate cavalry. They were able to fight their way back across the Rappahannock, but Forwood received a severe gunshot wound to the chest, ending his field service during the war.

Following his recovery from this wound, Forwood was assigned as the executive officer of Satterlee General Hospital in Philadelphia and served there until April 1864. He spent the next two months in charge of the medical stores ship Marcy C. Day in Hampton Roads. In June 1864, Forwood organized and built Whitehall General Hospital near Bristol, Pennsylvania. He commanded the two-thousand-bed hospital through the end of the war, until September 1865. On March 13, 1865, he was given brevet promotions of captain and major for faithful and meritorious service during the war.

=== After the war ===
Forwood was next assigned to Fort Riley, where he served until June 1867. He was promoted to captain on July 28, 1866, and fought a severe epidemic of cholera there later in the year. His service at Fort Riley was punctuated by several field expeditions of the 2nd Cavalry against hostile Indians along the upper Arkansas River.

Forwood was transferred to Fort Larned in June 1867, where he served until July 1870, apparently keeping a wolf and a buffalo as pets. The post commander ordered him to get rid of the buffalo, terming it a "public nuisance." On January 31, 1869, the post adjutant informed Forwood that "complaints have also been made of the howling of the wolf at night. It is therefore directed that you have the animal removed to someplace where it will not be an annoyance to the garrison." It is unknown what Forwood's response was to this directive, but apparently, he complied.

He was assigned to Fort Brady until October 1872, but a good part of this period was spent on a leave of absence studying yellow fever at a quarantine station near Philadelphia. He was also married during this leave, to Mary Osbourne on September 28, 1870. He was then assigned to Fort Richardson, Texas until September 1876. The next three years brought brief assignments to Raleigh, North Carolina, Columbia, South Carolina, and Fort McPherson, Georgia.

In December 1879, Forwood was transferred to Fort Omaha as the post surgeon. During the next three years, he served as a surgeon and naturalist for the annual military reconnaissance and exploring expeditions ordered by General Philip Sheridan. In November 1882, he was assigned to Chicago as the attending surgeon for the headquarters of the Division of the Missouri. He again accompanied the exploring expedition in the summer of 1883, this time in the company of President Chester A. Arthur and Secretary of War Robert T. Lincoln. He published his observations from these expeditions in 1881 and 1882. He remained in Chicago until December 1886. Following another leave of absence, he then served for three years as the post surgeon for Fort Snelling.

On May 27, 1890, Forwood was assigned as an attending surgeon at the United States Soldiers' Home in Washington, D.C., where he remained until December 12, 1898. He was promoted to lieutenant colonel on June 15, 1891, and was appointed the professor of military surgery when the Army Medical School was organized in 1893. From 1895 to 1897, he chaired the departments of surgery and surgical pathology at Georgetown University. On May 3, 1897, he was promoted to colonel, ranking only behind the Surgeon General in the Medical Corps. He chaired the department of military surgery at the same university from 1897 to 1898 and received an honorary degree of LL.D. for his contributions.

Forwood departed the university in the summer of 1898 to establish a large hospital and convalescent camp at Montauk, New York to deal with the huge numbers of sick soldiers returning from Cuba. He selected the site and oversaw the construction of a similar facility at Savannah, Georgia later in the same year. In December 1898, he was transferred to San Francisco, California as the chief surgeon of the Department of California.

In 1901, he was assigned to duty in the office of the Surgeon General in Washington, and that fall was made president of the faculty of the Army Medical School. When Surgeon General Sternberg retired, Forwood was promoted to the post on June 8, 1902. He served as the Surgeon General for his last three months before compulsory retirement for age on September 7, 1902. He lived the rest of his life in Washington, dying after a prolonged illness on May 12, 1915.

Forwood and his wife are buried in Section 1 of Arlington National Cemetery.
