= Charles Henry Alden =

United States Army general (1836–1906)

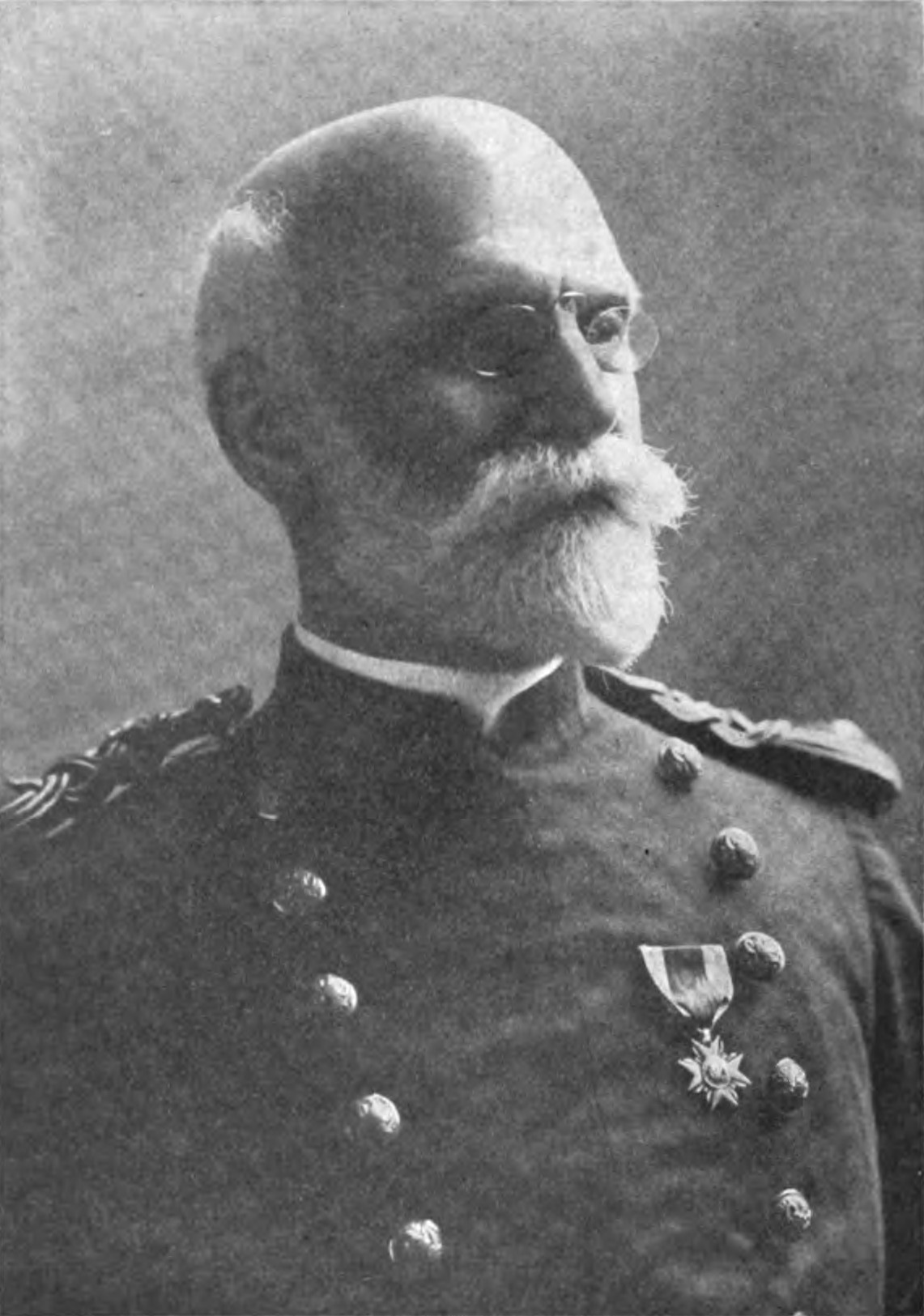
- Born: April 28, 1836; Philadelphia, Pennsylvania, U.S.
- Died: June 7, 1906 (aged 70) Pasadena, California, U.S.
- Buried: Arlington National Cemetery
- Allegiance: United States
- Branch: United States Medical Corps
- Service years: 1860–1900
- Rank: Brigadier General
- Spouse: Katharine Russell Lincoln
- Children: 2

Charles Henry Alden (April 28, 1836 – June 7, 1906) was an American military officer who was a member of the United States Medical Corps and the first president of the Army Medical School.

== Early life and education ==
Charles Henry Alden was born in Philadelphia, Pennsylvania, on April 28, 1836, to his father, Charles H. Alden, who had been a chaplain in the navy. After receiving an A. M. in 1856 from Brown University, he attended Pennsylvania Medical College (the medical department of Gettysburg College) and graduated in 1858. In April of the following year, Alden passed the examination necessary to enter the United States Medical Corps, and became a contract surgeon. He was soon ordered to travel to Fort Defiance, and participated in a campaign against Navajo Indians. Alden married Katharine Russell Lincoln (1838–1934) on October 22, 1864. They had two children

== Early career ==
On June 23, 1860, Alden became an assistant surgeon. During the next year he served in New Mexico, at five locations. At the beginning of the Civil War, he was captured (together with most of the 7th Infantry) on July 27, 1861, in San Augustine Springs. He was paroled and for about a year served at camps of prisoners of war at Fort Leavenworth, Jefferson Barracks, and Rouse's Point.

In July 1862, Alden travelled to Washington, where he organized the Georgetown College Hospital. In October, his parole having expired, worked for the medical director of the Army of the Potomac, during which, he commanded the evacuation of wounded after the Battle of Fredericksburg from Falmouth to Acquia Creek. In Spring 1863, he travelled to Philadelphia, and was given charge of Turner's Lane General Hospital and made recorder of the Army Medical Examining Board.

He was given the brevets of major and lieutenant colonel on March 13, 1865, for “faithful and meritorious service” and on June 23, 1865, was promoted to captain in the regular corps, and later a major. In May 1867 he was transferred to the 30th Infantry, which was protecting builders of the Transcontinental railroad in Wyoming. He was on this duty and spent time at Fort D. A. Russell, Wyoming, for three years, later at Fort Gratiot, Michigan (from 1870 to 1872), then a year at Fort Porter, Fort Walla Walla (1873–1876), and a final year at Fort Townsend. Alden spent four months’ leave in1873, traveling to Europe and, in 1875, fighting in Wallowa Valley, Oregon, and later in Idaho in 1877 with a campaign against the Nez Perce.

He travelled New York City in November 1877, where he would work for five years as recorder of the Army Medical Examining Board until Alden was transferred to Fort Yates. After two years, he was sent to Fort Snelling, where he served as post and attending surgeon at the Department of Dakota headquarters.

Alden wrote Reports on surgical cases to the surgical section of the Medical and Surgical History of the War of the Rebellion and a Report on prison depot, Fort Delaware. Later, a report "on the climate of Fort D. A. Russell together with its flora and fauna was issued as a circular from the office of The Surgeon General in 1870 as was also a similar report on Fort Walla Walla in 1875. A report of surgical cases in 1871 was made the subject of a circular from the same source (S.G.O. Cir. No. 3, August 17, 1871)." An early proponent of antiseptic surgery.

== Later career ==
After three years at Fort Snelling, Alden was transferred to the United States Military Academy in 1887, where he worked there, and served as president of the Army Medical Examining Board at the same time. In 1888, after Alden's suggestion, the board began meeting "periodically for examination of classes of candidates instead of examining them singly as they presented themselves."

In 1891 Alden (who had been promoted to lieutenant colonel on November 14, 1888), was transferred to St. Paul, Minnesota, where he assumed medical directorship of the Department of Dakota. That same year, he helped to form the Association of Military Surgeons of the National Guard in Chicago. Though he helped write the constitution and by-laws, he was not eligible to be a member, and was thus one of five non-national guard members elected honorary membership at this meeting.

In August 1892, Alden began working in the office of The Surgeon General and was in charge of the Hospital Corps, as well as the division of supply. During the Spanish–American War, he managed both of the duties. Alden was later George Miller Sternberg's chief assistant and often in charge of the office when Sternberg was away. One of the most prominent proponents of an Army Medical school, when the Army Medical School was created in 1893, he was appointed the first president of the school, and served as a lecturer. Alden is credited with the recommendation that led to Circular No. 9 being issued on September 9, 1895. Under the circular, soldiers with hernia, instead of being discharged, were operated upon. In 1896 he was a delegate to the Pan-American Medical Congress in Mexico City and the following year a delegate to the Association of Military Surgeons meeting. At the latter meeting, he was elected president of the society. As James M. Phalen wrote "During the greater part of his Washington service he was again the president of the board for examination of candidates for the corps. By repeated service on this board he exercised more influence upon the membership of the corps than any man since the retirement of Surgeon Thomas G. Mower." By 1897, he was an Assistant Surgeon General.

Alden retired on April 28, 1900, and moved to Newtonville, Massachusetts. In 1901 the University of Pennsylvania gave him an honorary Doctor of Medicine (making him the twenty second person to receive such a degree from the university). On April 23, 1904, he became a brigadier general on the retired list. In failing health, he moved to Pasadena, and died pulmonary tuberculosis on June 7, 1906. He and his wife Katherine are interred at Arlington National Cemetery.
