= Mariajuana Smoking in Panama =

1933 report

Mariajuana Smoking in Panama is the title of a 1933 report created by United States Army Medical Corps Colonel Joseph Franklin Siler (J.F. Siler) for the Commanding General of the Army's Panama Canal Department concerning cannabis (marijuana) use by U.S. military members. Use at that time in the Panama Canal Zone, then a U.S. territory, was a concern for military discipline and health.

The report has been called "one of the earliest semi-experimental studies" of cannabis. The report on Siler's research, going back to 1925, found that cannabis was "not habit forming in the same way as opiates and cocaine" and military delinquencies due to its use were "negligible in number" compared to alcohol.

== Citations ==
=== By other reports and research ===
The 1933 report has been cited by other reports and research including the Surgeon General's 1988 Health Consequences of Smoking: Nicotine Addiction, the Department of Health, Education and Welfare's 1972 report to Congress, Licit and Illicit Drugs by Consumers Union (1972), medical studies on human appetite, and others.

=== By legal defenses ===
In 1964, Lowell Eggemeier's legal defense cited the 1933 government report, in the nation's first protest against what was called irrational drug control policy.

== See also ==
- Cannabis and the United States military
