= Brooke Army Medical Center =

US Army medical facility at Fort Sam Houston, San Antonio, Texas

Coordinates: 29.4605°N 98.4156°W

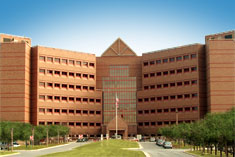
- Active: 1946–present
- Country: United States
- Allegiance: United States of America
- Branch: United States Army
- Type: Hospital
- Role: Inpatient and Outpatient Services; Graduate Medical Education; Level I Trauma Center
- Size: 450 beds
- Garrison/HQ: Fort Sam Houston
- Decorations: Superior Unit Award
- Website: https://bamc.tricare.mil

Commanders
- Current commander: Colonel Kevin Kelly

Insignia
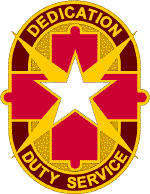
- Identification symbol

Brooke Army Medical Center (BAMC) is the United States Army's premier medical institution. Located on Fort Sam Houston, BAMC is a 425-bed academic medical center, and is the Department of Defense's largest facility and only Level 1 trauma center. BAMC is also home to the Center for the Intrepid, an outpatient rehabilitation facility. The center is composed of ten separate organizations, including community medical clinics, centered around the Army's largest in-patient hospital. BAMC is staffed by more than 8,000 soldiers, airmen, sailors, civilians, and contractors, providing care to wounded service members and the San Antonio community at large.

== History ==
=== Station Hospital ===
- Station Hospital (Brooke General Hospital)
- U.S. National Register of Historic Places
- U.S. Historic district – Contributing property
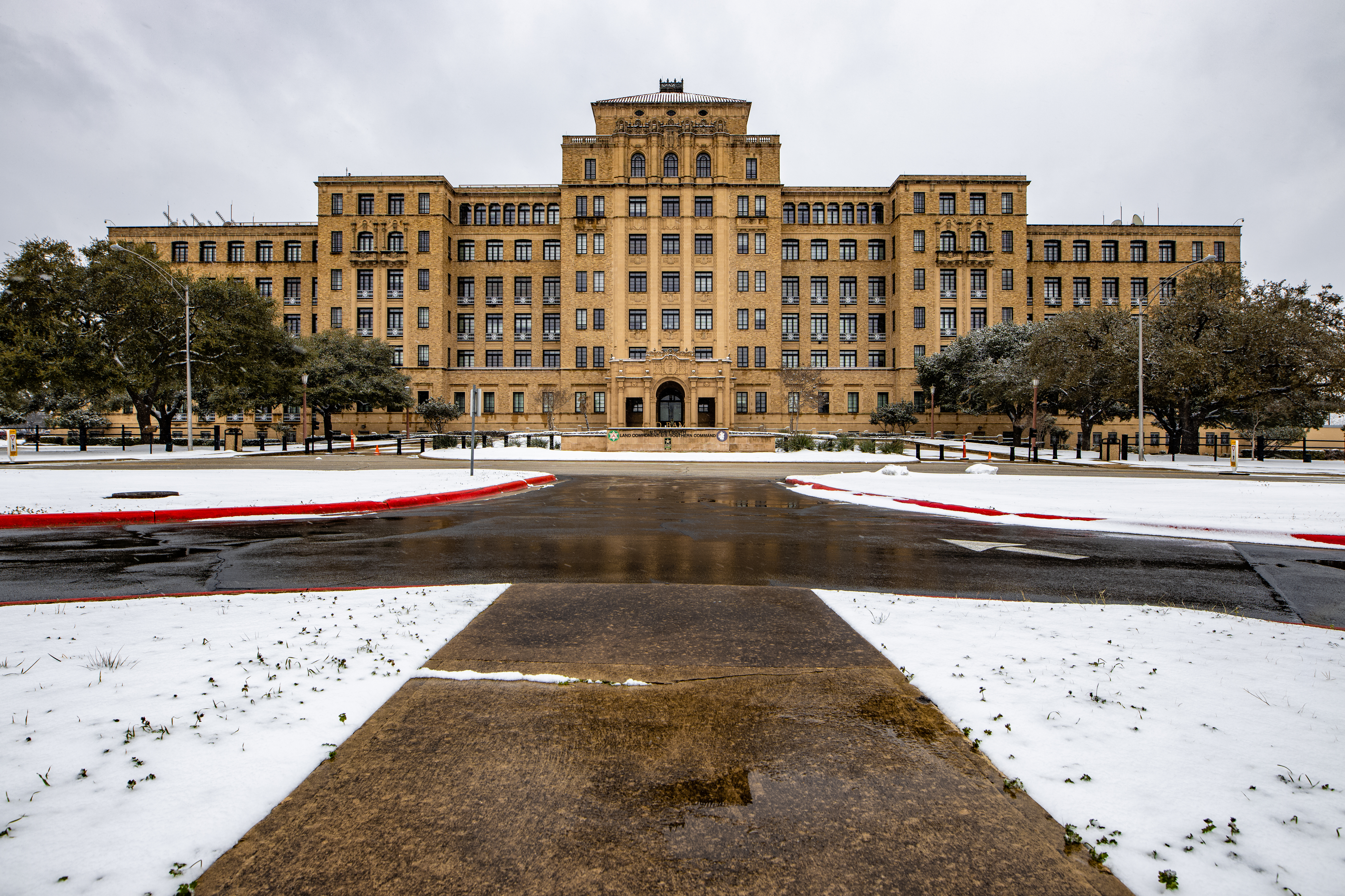
- Location: San Antonio, Texas
- Area: 30 acres (120,000 m^{2})
- Built: 1937
- Architectural style: Mission/Spanish Revival
- Part of: Fort Sam Houston (ID75001950)
- NRHP reference No.: 01001281

Significant dates
- Added to NRHP: November 30, 2001
- Designated CP: May 15, 1975

Brooke Army Medical Center has a history which dates back to 1879 when the first Post Hospital opened as a small medical dispensary located in a single-story wooden building. In 1886, the first permanent hospital was built. In 1908, an 84-bed Station Hospital was constructed on the west side of the post.

In 1929, Brigadier General Roger Brooke assumed command of the Station Hospital, a position he held until 1933. Brooke is credited with instituting the first routine chest X-ray in military medicine. In July 1936, the cornerstone was laid for the construction of a replacement Station Hospital. By November 1937, the new 418-bed hospital was operational, having cost $3 million. The new hospital was the first in a series of moves which changed Fort Sam Houston from an Infantry to a medical Post.

In 1941, the Station Hospital prepared for an overwhelming flow of casualties from World War II battlefields by converting a 220-person enlisted barracks into additional patient wards.

=== Brooke General Hospital ===
In 1942, the Station Hospital was renamed Brooke General Hospital in Brooke's honor. In 1944, BAMC converted a Cavalry Battalion barracks into a convalescent unit to accommodate the flow of casualties from the war. This building later became Beach Pavilion. Beach housed a substantial portion of BAMC assets to include patient wards and specialty clinics.

=== Brooke Army Medical Center ===
In 1946, Fort Sam Houston was chosen as the new site for the U.S. Army Medical Field Service School. The decision to centralize the Army's medical research and training at one location resulted in the renaming of Brooke General Hospital to Brooke Army Medical Center. In September 1987, the official groundbreaking took place for the construction of a new hospital.

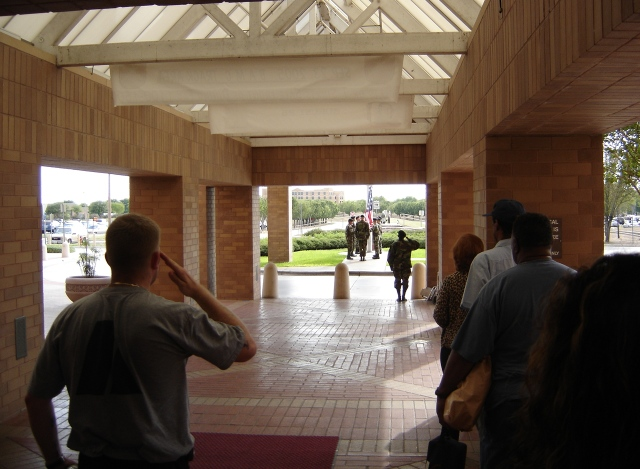
Folding the US flag at the BAMC main entrance in 2005.

On July 18, 1995, ownership of the replacement hospital was given to the BAMC Commander by the U.S. Army Corps of Engineers during the key turnover ceremony. On March 14, 1996, the new facility was officially dedicated and on April 13, BAMC opened for business with the transfer of inpatients from the "old" BAMC to the "new" BAMC.

Today "old" BAMC is home to United States Army South and a number of smaller units.

=== SAMMC ===
Because of the 2005 Base Realignment and Closure, Brooke Army Medical Center's inpatient absorbed those of the Air Force's Wilford Hall (Wilford Hall no longer provides inpatient care) creating San Antonio Military Medical Center (SAMMC) on September 6, 2011. As of 1 Oct 2017, the designation SAMMC was removed and BAMC continues to represent the headquarters that serves as the command for the entire hospital along with the medical clinics on Fort Sam Houston, others in the San Antonio area, and one at the Army Depot in Corpus Christi. The collaboration between BAMC and local Air Force Medical assets are governed by the San Antonio Military Health System (SAMHS).

=== Timeline ===
- 1870 to 1875 - City of San Antonio donates 92 acres (370,000 m^{2}) for an Army post
- 1879 - temporary wooden (board and batten, not log) 12-bed hospital built
- 1886 - permanent, brick 12-bed hospital built to replace the temporary one
- 1908 - Station Hospital built to accommodate 84 beds
- 1910 - two wings added to Station Hospital, increasing its capacity by 68 beds
- 1912 - an isolation ward and a maternity ward added to Station Hospital
- 1936 - construction begins on new Station Hospital building, on the site of the old Camp Travis Base Hospital
- 1938 - new Station Hospital opens with a 418-bed capacity
- 1941 to 1945 - Station Hospital expands by converting barracks to hospital wards
- 1942 - Station Hospital named Brooke General Hospital
- 1942 - psychiatric ward built in Old Station Hospital area
- 1945 - 15th Field Artillery Barracks become Annex IV, increasing capacity to 7,800 beds
- 1946 - the Medical Field Service School (MFSS) is moved to Fort Sam Houston. The medical entities are reorganized and designated Brooke Army Medical Center (BAMC)
- 1959 - Annex IV is designated Beach Pavilion
- 1959 - psychiatric ward is designated Chambers Pavilion
- 1975 - added to the National Register of Historic Places as a contributing property of the Fort Sam Houston Historic District
- 1983 - design authority issued for a facility to replace BAMC's 59 separate buildings
- 1985 - concept design started for the new BAMC
- 1992 - construction of new BAMC starts
- 1996 - new BAMC opens
- 2001 - added individually to the National Register of Historic Places
- 2005 - BRAC 2005 recommends (172 Med 10) the realignment of inpatient services and related specialty care from Wilford Hall Medical Center (WHMC) to Brooke Army Medical Center (BAMC), creating the San Antonio Military Medical Center (SAMMC)
- 2009 - BRAC construction begins
- 2011 - Parking Garage opened
- 2012 - Consolidated Tower (CoTo) wing opened
- 2015 - The new dining hall opens

== SAMMC ==
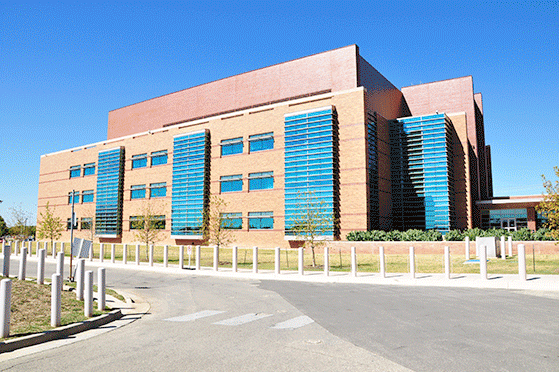
Battlefield Health and Trauma Research Institute

San Antonio Military Medical Center (SAMMC) — the inpatient capabilities at Brooke Army Medical Center (BAMC)— is situated at Fort Sam Houston, San Antonio, Texas, and is part of the U.S. Army Medical Command (MEDCOM). BAMC is the command element over all Army medical facilities in the San Antonio area, including SAMMC (SAMMC is no longer the term used; BAMC is the name of the hospital and is responsible for the administrative and clinical oversight of the Army healthcare facilities in San Antonio). The term SAMMC solely applies to the inpatient capabilities within the hospital at Brooke Army Medical Center (BAMC). The hospital as a whole as well as the outlying clinics are considered BAMC. It is a University of Texas Health Science Center at San Antonio and USUHS teaching hospital and is home to the U.S. Army Institute of Surgical Research (USAISR) Burn Center. The USAISR Burn Center is part of the U.S. Army Medical Research and Development Command located at Fort Detrick, Maryland.

The hospital today is a 425-bed Joint Commission-accredited facility, expandable to 653 beds in the event of disaster. Services include general medical and surgical care, adult and pediatric primary care clinics, 24-hour Emergency department, specialty clinics, clinical services, wellness and prevention services, veterinary care, and environmental health services.

BAMC is the only MEDCOM Level I trauma center in the Department of Defense, and is part of the Regional Health Command Central (RHC-C).

The old BGH building (1937) was added to the National Register of Historic Places on November 30, 2001.

== SAMMC (BAMC) concept ==
Under BRAC 2005, BAMC will expand its inpatient services as those services are relocated from the 59th Medical Wing, Wilford Hall Medical Center (USAF). The Nuclear Medicine service is one of the first to completely integrate operations, and offers PET/CT, SPECT/CT, and other molecular imaging and therapy services.

To accomplish the realignment of inpatient services and related specialty care from Wilford Hall Medical Center (WHMC) to Brooke Army Medical Center (BAMC) as presented in the BRAC 2005 scenario, BAMC will undergo the construction of a consolidated tower, a parking facility, a central energy plant, and renovations within the existing facility.

=== Consolidated Tower (CoTo) ===
Construction began in March 2009 on the nearly 738,000 sq ft (68,600 m^{2}) project. CoTo was added on the east side of the facility adjacent to the clinical building and medical mall. This addition houses administrative space, an outpatient pediatrics clinic, an expanded Emergency and Trauma department, a SICU, a CCU, a psychiatric unit, and an expansion of the USAISR Burn Center which has 16 Burn Intensive Care Unit beds and 24 Progressive Care beds. SAMMC will serve as a health science center for inpatient and ambulatory care, consisting of training for Graduate Medical Education (GME), a Level 1 Trauma Center. The USAISR Burn Center is the only American Burn Association verified Burn Center within the DoD.

=== Parking garage ===
Construction began in March 2009 on a multi-level, 5,000-space parking structure to accommodate the increased capacity at the upgraded medical facility.

=== Central energy plant ===
Due to the size increase in the BAMC facility, additional heating and cooling capacities are being provided with a 22,400-square-foot (2,080 m^{2}) central energy plant, which is under construction.
