= George Russell Callender =

United States Army general and physician (1884–1973)

Brigadier General George Russell Callender
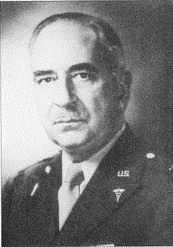
- BG George Russell Callender
- Born: May 13, 1884; Everett, Massachusetts, US
- Died: February 26, 1973 (aged 88)
- Resting place: Arlington National Cemetery
- Education: Tufts University School of Medicine
- Occupation: Military physician
- Notable work: The Walter Reed Tropical Medicine Course
- Spouse: Gladys Moore Callender

Brig. Gen. George Russell Callender (1884–1973) was an American physician and army officer. He was the commandant of the Medical Department Professional Service Schools in Washington, D. C. (now known as the Walter Reed Army Institute of Research), founding commandant of the Walter Reed Tropical Medicine Course.

== Biography ==
Callender was born in Everett, Massachusetts on May 13, 1884. He graduated from Tufts College Medical School, Boston in 1908, was commissioned in the Medical Reserve Corps in 1912, and entered the service (US Army) on May 18, 1913. He graduated from the Army Medical School in 1913. Afterwards he served in the Hawaii Department 1916–1918 and as a pathologist at Army Medical Center in 1939. Callender became the Assistant Commandant, then Commandant of Medical Department Professional Service Schools 1940–1946. He was promoted to Brigadier General in March 1945.

He retired from the Army in November 1946. Decorations included the Distinguished Service Medal. He was author of Malaria in Panama (1929).

== Honors and awards ==
Callender was awarded the Richard Pearson Strong Palladium Medal by the American Foundation for Tropical Medicine in 1946. As stated in the citation accompanying the award, "Brig. Gen. Callender's supervision, guidance and research in the school contributed directly to the achievement of the lowest sick rate of any army in the history of war. His initiative and effort were largely responsible for the creation of the course in tropical medicine and for the development of extensive research activities at the Army Medical School in 1941 before Pearl Harbor. As a result of the typhus vaccine developed in 1942 not a single United States soldier died of epidemic typhus fever."

General Callender was buried at Arlington National Cemetery, in Virginia.

== See also ==
- American Society of Tropical Medicine and Hygiene
