= Army Medical School =

School of public health and preventive medicine

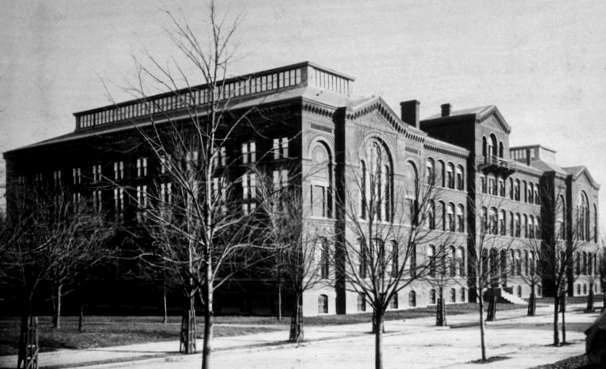
The Army Medical Museum and Library building, which housed the Army Medical School between 1893 and 1910. "Old Red" was located on the National Mall in Washington, DC.

The Army Medical School (AMS) was founded by U.S. Army Brigadier General George Miller Sternberg. According to some, it was the world's first school of public health and preventive medicine. (The other institution vying for this distinction is the Johns Hopkins School of Public Health (1916).) The AMS ultimately became the Army Medical Center (1923), then the Walter Reed Army Institute of Research (1953).

== History ==
Sternberg created the Army Medical School by issuing "General Order 51" on June 24, 1893. The School was housed, along with the Army Medical Library in the building of the Army Medical Museum and Library (affectionately known as the "Old Pickle Factory" or "Old Red") at 7th Street and South B Street (now Independence Avenue), SW, Washington, D.C. (This site is on the National Mall where the Smithsonian's Hirshhorn Museum now stands.)

In 1910, the AMS relocated to 721 13th Street, NW and in 1916 to 604 Louisiana Avenue.

In 1923, the "Army Medical Center" (AMC) was created when (1) the AMS became the "Medical Department Professional Service School" (MDPSS) and (2) the MDPSS moved into "Building #40" on the grounds of the Walter Reed General Hospital (WRGH) in northern Washington, D.C.

The historic edifice known as Building #40 was constructed at 14th and Dahlia Streets beginning in 1922 and reached completion in 1932. This facility consists of four "Pavilions":

- The North or "Vedder Pavilion" (named for Col. Edward Bright Vedder (1878–1952) who established polished rice extract as the proper treatment for beri-beri);
- The South or "Craig Pavilion" (named for Col. Charles Franklin Craig (1872–1950) who in the Philippines proved (1907; with Percy M. Ashburn) dengue to be a filterable agent (virus) and later showed the mosquito Aedes aegypti responsible for dengue transmission);
- The East or "Sternberg Pavilion" (named for Gen. Sternberg (1838–1915), the U.S. Army Surgeon General and co-discoverer of the pneumococcus, known as the "Father of American Bacteriology");
- The West or "Siler Pavilion" (named for Col. Joseph Franklin Siler (1875–1960), who in 1925 first injected dengue virus in serum into humans producing disease and "closing the loop" on dengue transmissibility).

In 1947, the MDPSS became the "Army Medical Department Research and Graduate School" (AMDRGS), which in turn became the "Army Medical Service Graduate School" (AMSGS) in 1950.

In September 1951, "General Order Number 8" combined the WRGH & AMC into the present-day Walter Reed Army Medical Center (WRAMC). Three years later, the research elements of this facility became the present-day Walter Reed Army Institute of Research (WRAIR).

== List of presidents and commandants ==
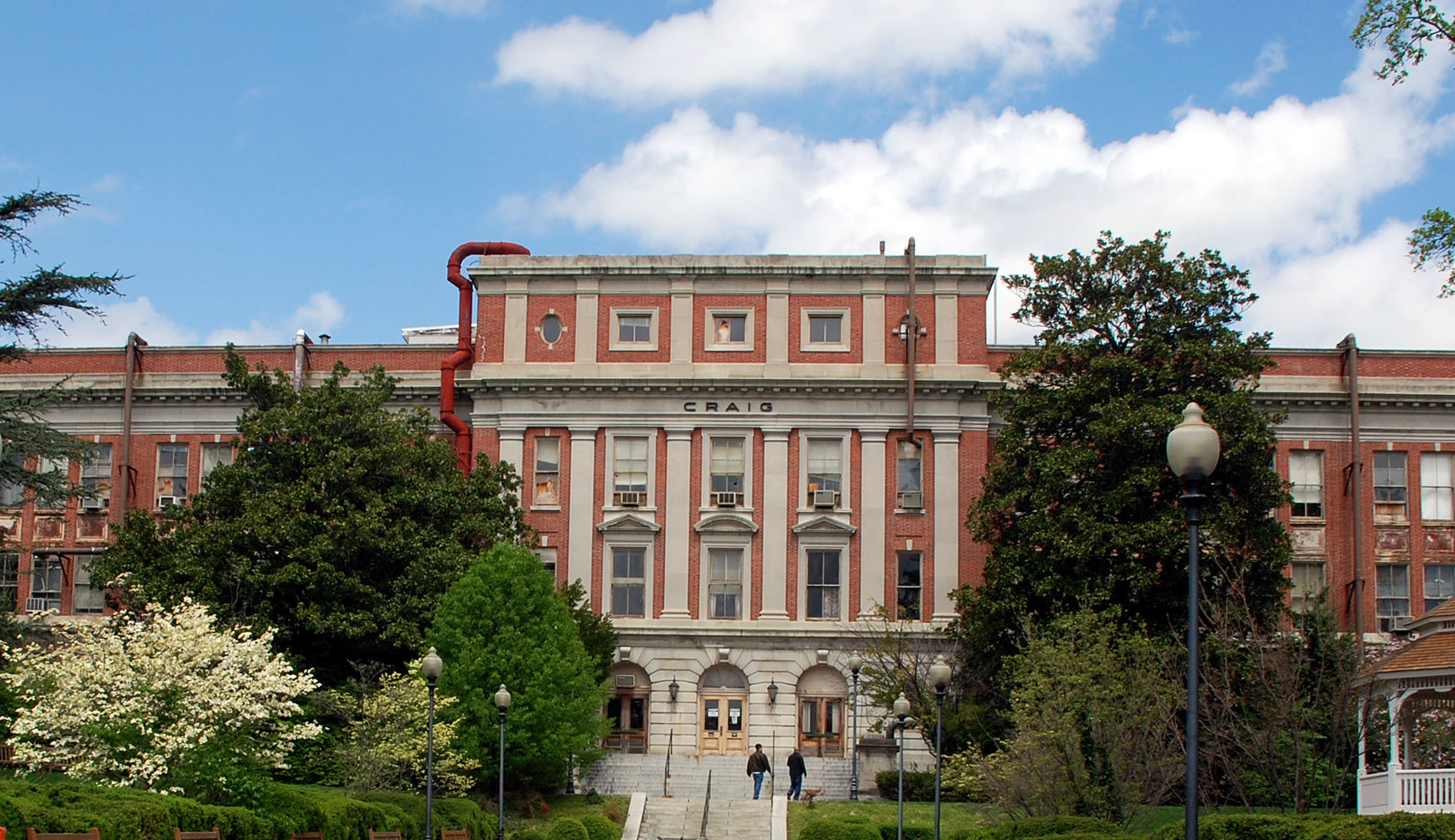
The South, or Craig, Pavilion of Building 40, home to the four successors to the AMS: the Medical Department Professional Service School (1923-1947), the Army Medical Department Research and Graduate School (1947-1950), the Army Medical Service Graduate School (1950-1953), and finally the Walter Reed Army Institute of Research (1953-1999). Building 40 is at 14th and Dahlia Streets at the old Walter Reed complex in northern Washington, D.C.

President	Tenure		Ref(s)
Col. Charles Henry Alden	1893	1898	
CLOSED DURING SPANISH-AMERICAN WAR	1898	1901	
Col. William Henry Forwood	1901	1902	
Brig. Gen. Calvin DeWitt	1902	1903	
Col. Charles Lawrence Heizmann	1903	1906	
Col. Valery Havard	1906	1909	
Col. Louis Anatole LaGarde	1909	1912	
Col. Charles Richard	1912	1915	
Brig. Gen. William Hempel Arthur	1915	1918	
Col. Weston Percival Chamberlain	1918	1918	
Brig. Gen. Francis Anderson Winter	1918	1919	
Brig. Gen. Walter Drew McCaw	1919	1923	
Col. Weston Percival Chamberlain	1923	1924	
Brig. Gen. Henry Clay Fisher	1924	1929	
Col. Christopher Clark Collins	1929	1930	
Col. Charles Franklin Craig	1930	1931	
Col. Jay Ralph Shook	1931	1931	
Col. Edward Bright Vedder	1931	1932	
Col. Philip Weatherly Huntington	1932	1935	
Col. Joseph Franklin Siler	1935	1939	
Col. George Russell Callender	1940	1946	
Rufus Holt	1946	1949	
Elbert De Coursey	1949	1950	
William S. Stone	1950	1953	

== See also ==
=== Buildings ===
- Army Medical Museum and Library
- Building 40 (Army Medical School)

=== Notable people associated with the AMS and AMC ===
Graduates:

- Brig. Gen. Carl Rogers Darnall ('97), also Professor of Chemistry, Center Commander, developed (1910) chlorination of drinking water
- Brig. Gen. Roger Brooke ('02)

Others:

- Brig. Gen. George Miller Sternberg
- Major Walter Reed
- Col. Edward Bright Vedder
- Charles Franklin Craig
- Col. Joseph Franklin Siler
- Frederick F. Russell
- Maurice Hilleman, famed vaccinologist, Chief of Dept of Respiratory Diseases (1948–57)
- Brig. Gen. Russell Callendar, Commandant when the tropical medicine course was created in 1941
- Col. George W. Hunter III, faculty of the Tropical and Military Medicine Course, author of Manual of Tropical Medicine (now Hunter's Tropical Medicine)
- Capt. Daniel Carleton Gajdusek, later a Nobel Prize winner (and child molester); assigned to AMSGS (1951–53).
