= Theodore Woodward =

American medical researcher

Theodore E. Woodward
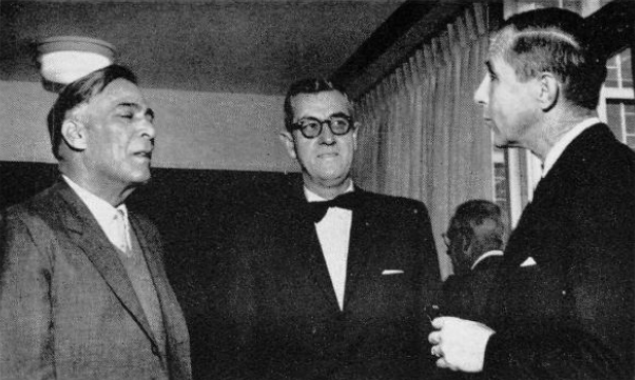
- Wajid Ali Khan Burki (left), chats with Dr. James A. Shannon, and Dr. Theodore E. Woodward, c. 1962
- Born: March 22, 1914; Westminster, Maryland, U.S.
- Died: July 11, 2005 (aged 91); Baltimore, Maryland, U.S.
- Education: Franklin & Marshall College; University of Maryland School of Medicine
- Occupation: Medical Researcher
- Spouse: Celeste Lauve Woodward (m. 1938–2005)
- Children: 4
- Awards: Louis Pasteur Medal (1961)

Theodore Englar Woodward (March 22, 1914 – July 11, 2005) was an American medical researcher at the University of Maryland, Baltimore. In his Baltimore Sun obituary, it was claimed that 1948, he received a Nobel Prize nomination for his role in finding cures for typhus and typhoid fever, however his name does not appear in the Nobel nomination archives.

== Biography ==
Born in Westminster, Maryland the son of Lewis K. Woodward, Sr. and grandson of Lewis Woodward, Theodore E. Woodward is the patriarch of one of Maryland's large medical families, consisting of his wife, Celeste L. Woodward, his sons, William E. Woodward and R. Craig Woodward, and his daughter, Celeste L. Woodward. After his early education at the West End School and the Westminster Elementary and High School, he attended Franklin and Marshall College where he graduated in 1934. He received his medical degree from the University of Maryland School of Medicine in 1938.

After a two-year rotating internship at the University of Maryland Hospital, he trained in internal medicine and gastroenterology at the Henry Ford Hospital in Detroit, all in preparation to enter practice in Carroll County, Maryland.

Woodward entered the service of the United States Army in January 1941, just prior to the outbreak of World War II. During the ensuing five years, he served in various medical units and with the United States Typhus Fever Commission with assignments in North Africa, Italy, England, France, New Guinea and offshore islands, and the Philippine Islands.

Woodward authored the history of the U.S. Armed Forces Epidemiological Board and Commissions, which fostered the development of many advances in military medicine, with lasting benefits for civilian public health and disease prevention.

Following discharge from military service in June 1946, Woodward entered private practice. In 1948, he was appointed as a full-time Associate Professor of Medicine at the University of Maryland School of Medicine. In June 1954, he was appointed to the Chair of Medicine, a position which he held until 1981, at the time of his retirement. Woodward died in Baltimore aged 91.

Woodward is credited having the "best claim" to coining, in the late 1940s, the medical zebra aphorism (following the principle of Occam's razor) paraphrased variously as:

"When you hear hoofbeats, think horses, not zebras."

and

"When you hear hoofbeats behind you, don't expect to see a zebra."

== See also ==
- University of Maryland School of Medicine
- University of Maryland, Baltimore, professor for nearly a half-century at the University of Maryland School of Medicine
- Infectious Diseases Society of America, a charter member of the IDSA and president in 1976
- Infectious Disease, "He was one of the real founding fathers of the discipline of infectious diseases" -William L. Henrich
- Walter Reed Tropical Medicine Course, former faculty and recipient of "The Colonel George W. Hunter III Certificate"
