= Cannabis in the Vietnam War =

Cannabis use during the Vietnam War became prevalent during the late 1960s and 1970s. This is primarily due to the usage of marijuana in the United States increasing along with soldiers using it as an escape from the conflicts around them. The United States Government implemented policies and rules to stop the growing usage of marijuana and other substances, such as heroin. When the media in the United States learned about the usage of marijuana and heroin, they wrote sensational news articles which often exaggerated the use of the substances.

== Cannabis use during the war ==
=== Origins ===
Cannabis plants are native to Southeast Asia, including Vietnam. The indigenous cannabis plants of Vietnam had a stronger potency when compared to the cannabis that was grown in the Americas. The Vietnamese did not usually use marijuana but preferred other substances such as betel nuts and opium, so they only increased the amount of marijuana they grew to sell more to American soldiers. American soldiers changed the word for marijuana depending on where they were within Vietnam. Among the names they used were "Pleiku Pink," "Bleu de Hue," and "Cambodian Red."

During the conflict in Vietnam, there were three primary substances that soldiers consumed: alcohol, marijuana, and heroin. Each substance had its usage peak at different times. The first substance to peak was alcohol, then marijuana, and finally heroin, which saw its peak towards the end of the war.

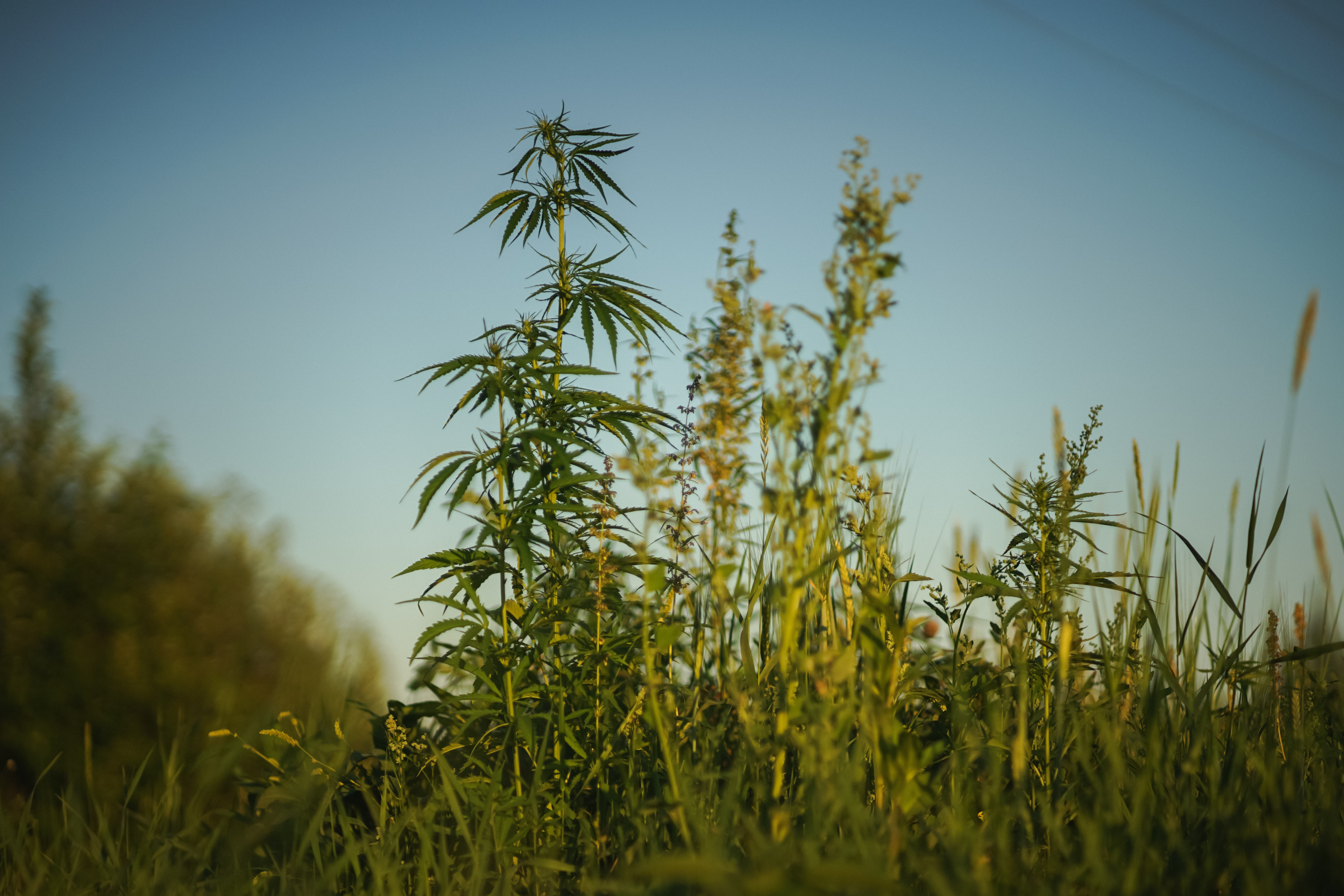
Cannabis plant, sativa

Marijuana usage during the war took place more towards the end of the 60s. During the late 50s and 60s, the primary substance that was being used among the soldiers was alcohol. The primary reason why soldiers drank alcohol more than they smoked marijuana is because they were not exposed to smoking marijuana back in the United States. The shift from alcohol to marijuana happened when the newly drafted soldiers who came in were either exposed to marijuana in the United States or were current users. As the number of troops who already smoked marijuana increased, the percentage of soldiers already stationed that started using marijuana also increased; however, the number of soldiers who smoked before entering the war was always greater than those who were first trying in Vietnam. The increase of marijuana usage back in the United States rose with the growth of anti-war protests, which started to become more prevalent towards the end of the '60s. Smoking marijuana became a form of rebellion among the youths at the protests because it was still illegal to use.

Along with the increase of soldiers who had already smoked before entering Vietnam, soldiers also started smoking as a coping mechanism. Soldiers turned to various substances to get them through the many experiences they encountered throughout the war, with one of the popular substances being cannabis. Marijuana was used as an escape by many soldiers and as a form of self-medication.

Soldiers purchased cannabis from the Vietnamese. Vietnamese farmers started to grow more cannabis after recognizing the demand from American soldiers. Farmers sold cannabis to American troops in several ways, including placing the cannabis within cigarette packs.

=== Impact ===
Statistics collected during the war show an increase in marijuana use as the conflict went on. In 1966, the percentage of people who used marijuana before Vietnam was 12%, while by 1970 it was 46%. The same study also showed that from 1967 to 1971 the number of soldiers who used marijuana semi-regularly went from 7% to 34%, while the number that used it regularly was 17% by 1971.

Marijuana use eventually decreased and was replaced by heroin. Heroin usage did not increase with the number of users back in the United States as marijuana did. Two primary reasons for heroin's popularity were that it was readily available in Vietnam and it was easier to transport due to it having no scent.

An unforeseen side effect was the growth of an illegal business within some U.S. bases in Vietnam. For example, 43 members of security elements at Cam Ranh Bay were arrested in a sting operation. Another incident occurred in 1970 when an Air Force major and pilot were caught trying to smuggle eight million dollars' worth of drugs out of Vietnam.

=== Policies ===
The increase in drug use did not go unnoticed by the United States Government. When the war started, the government did not put a lot of effort into arresting soldiers who partook in drug usage simply because the number was so low it did not stand out as an issue. Congressional subcommittees brought to light the increase in drug use in Vietnam, which concerned the military, so they began measures to curb drug usage. Efforts to curb drug usage also increased greatly when journalists in the United States published a number of articles about drug use by troops, which put more pressure on the United States government. The Army's Criminal Investigation Division contributed the most to arresting soldiers for drug usage and discouraging drug use. Originally, the military focused more on punishment for soldiers getting caught with drugs until the rise in heroin use. When heroin became the primary issue, the military pivoted from punishment to treatment, and by the 1970s more troops were sent home for drug treatment than for injuries.

Most policies introduced at this time were done so by President Nixon. One of the first major policies was implemented June 11, 1971, which was urinary testing for returning soldiers, eventually random testing was implemented April 4, 1974.

One unintended consequence of heightened monitoring for marijuana use was an increase in heroin usage. Heroin usage increased within Vietnam due to the military cracking down on marijuana use and the easy access to heroin within Vietnam. Vietnam was very close to the Golden Triangle which was a region for opium and heroin production. Heroin was also harder to detect compared to marijuana because it was odorless and easier for a soldier to hide and carry around.

== Effects in the United States ==
=== Media ===
The media in the United States pushed forward many false ideas about drug use in Vietnam. They relied on sensational media to spread ideas that the United States Army was having a serious drug problem. While there was a lot of drug use, it was not nearly as much as news outlets were saying it was. Some journalists even circulated the idea that U.S. soldiers were using drugs from the communists as a form of sabotage. These articles attempted to link drugs to a breakdown in the military's ability to function during wartime.

== See also ==
- Cannabis and the United States military
