= USS Relief (1896) =

American hospital ship

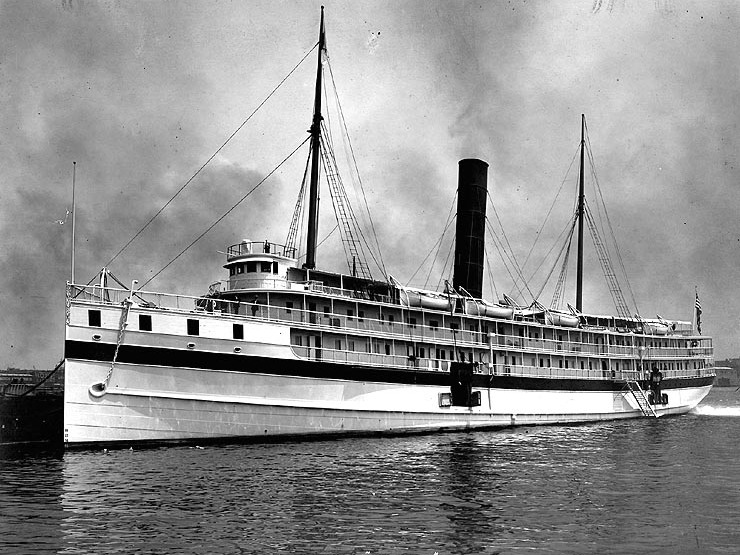
- USS Relief circa 1908.

History

United States
- Owner: 1896: Maine Steamship Co.; 1898: U.S. Army; 1902: U.S. Navy
- Builder: Delaware River Iron Ship Building and Engine Works
- Yard number: 288
- Completed: December 1896
- Acquired: 13 November 1902
- Commissioned: 6 February 1908
- Decommissioned: 10 June 1910
- Fate: Sold into merchant service, 15 May 1919; ultimate fate unknown

General characteristics
- Type: Passenger, later Hospital
- Tonnage: 3,168 gross
- Displacement: 3,300 tons
- Length: 314 ft (96 m)
- Beam: 46 ft (14 m)
- Draught: 15 ft 10 in (4.83 m)
- Depth of hold: 17 ft
- Installed power: Triple expansion steam engines
- Speed: 16 knots
- Complement: (U.S. Navy): 74
- Armament: none

The USAHS Relief and the second USS Relief was a hospital ship in, respectively, the United States Army and the United States Navy. She was later named USS Repose.

== Construction and design ==
Relief was built for the Maine Steamship Company in 1895–96 by the Delaware River Iron Ship Building and Engine Works of Chester, Pennsylvania as the passenger ship John Englis. A sister ship, Horatio Hall, was also constructed for the company at about the same time. The two vessels were powered by triple expansion steam engines operating at 180 lbs of steam pressure, and were capable of making 16 knots in favorable conditions. Their passenger accommodations, which included dining saloons on the upper deck, were said to be "very fine".

== Service history ==
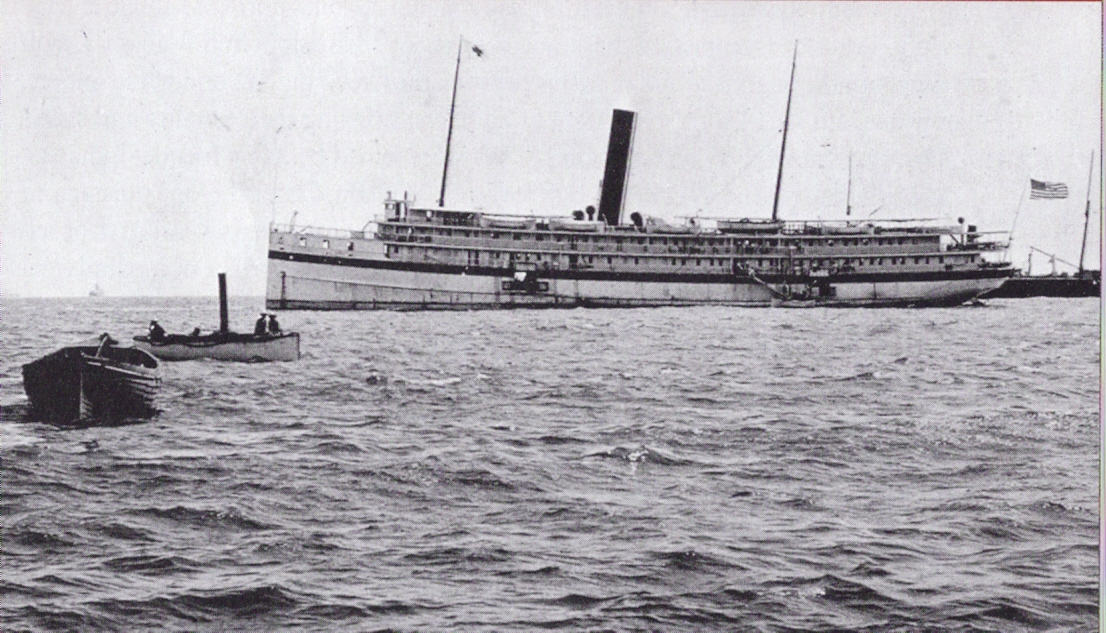
Relief off Cuba in 1898, serving as a United States Army hospital ship during the Spanish–American War. Small boats such as those pictured carried wounded and sick men from shore to Relief.

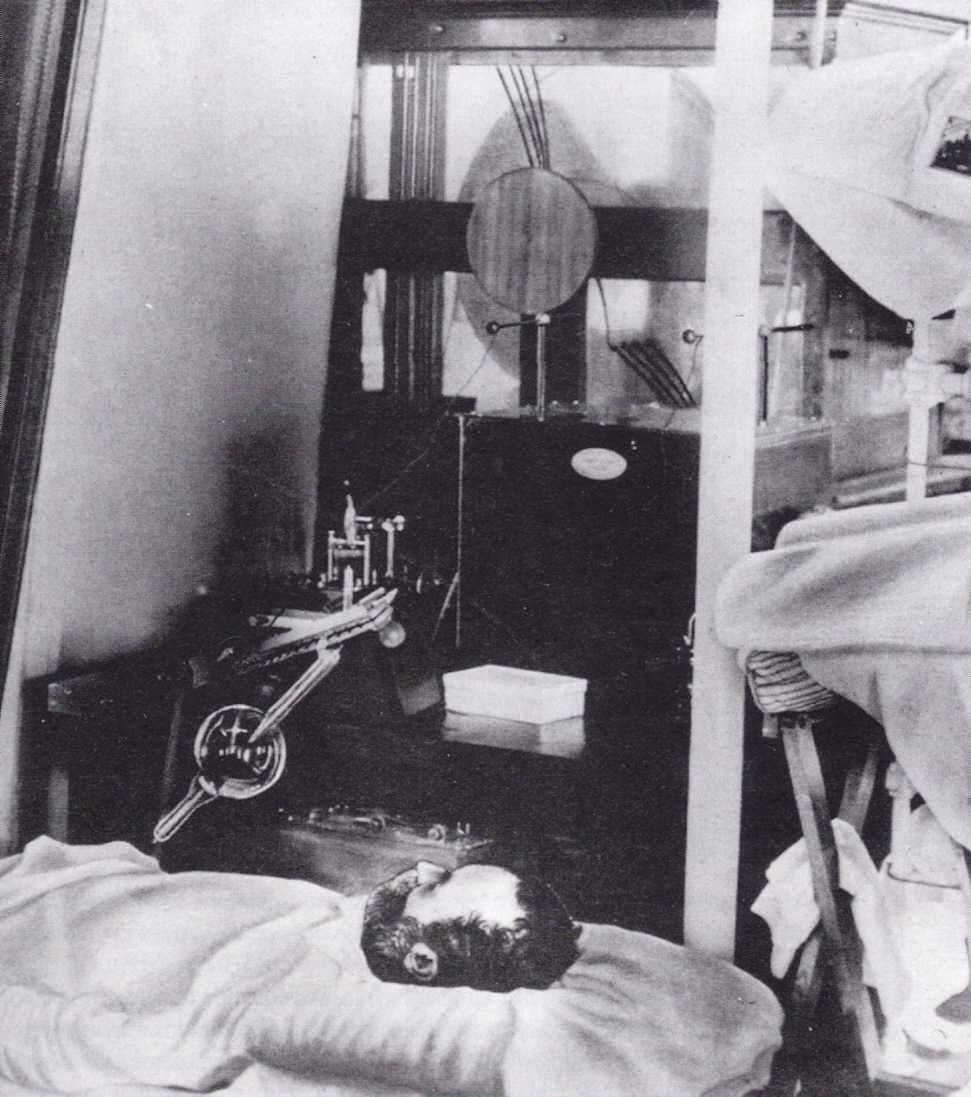
A patient is X-rayed aboard Relief off Siboney, Cuba, in 1898 while Relief was in U.S. Army service during the Spanish–American War.

John Englis was completed in December 1896 and was placed on the New York–Maine route, in which she is said to have been well patronized. In 1898 however, the Spanish–American War broke out, and John Englis was purchased by the United States Army for use as a hospital ship. Renamed Relief the ship was found to have insufficient coal capacity for safe trans Pacific navigation and was confined to Philippine waters based in Manila where, as of 1 January 1900, she was reported to be a "floating hospital" with 107 sick and wounded after a trip to outlying areas.

The ship was transferred to the U.S. Navy 13 November 1902. Relief remained inactive into 1908 at Mare Island Navy Yard while factions within the navy debated whether she should be commanded by a line officer or a medical officer. President Theodore Roosevelt's desire that a hospital ship accompany the Great White Fleet on its round-the-world voyage led to his endorsement of the Bureau of Medicine and Surgery viewpoint. Accordingly, Relief was commissioned at Mare Island Navy Yard 6 February 1908.

Departing San Francisco Bay 22 March 1908, Relief met the fleet in Magdalena Bay, Mexico, embarking patients for return to San Francisco. Relief rejoined the fleet at San Diego and remained with it while crossing the Pacific Ocean. Relief's staff provided expert medical care, treatment, and consultations for the more than 14,000 officers and men of the Great White Fleet until detached in November 1908 at Olongapo, Philippines.

Ordered to return to the U.S. west coast, Relief departed Cavite 14 November 1908 but suffered serious damage in a typhoon on the night of 18 and 19 November. Returning to Cavite, the hospital ship was subsequently found to be unseaworthy by an official survey and became a stationary, floating hospital and dispensary. Relief continued in service as a floating hospital at Olongapo, Philippines, through World War I, although decommissioned 10 June 1910. Her name was changed 11 April 1918 to Repose to allow that of Relief to be assigned to USS Relief (AH-1), a new hospital ship under construction at the Philadelphia Navy Yard.

Repose was sold 15 May 1919 at Olongapo and entered mercantile service under the same name after repairs. She subsequently served under foreign flags as Hai Ning and Mindanao until transferred to Philippine registry during 1937 and named Lanao. Bombed and sunk by Japanese aircraft at Cebu, The Philippines, 2 January 1942.

== See also ==
- Carl Rogers Darnall

== Bibliography ==
- Bradlee, Francis B. C. (1920): Some Account of Steam Navigation in New England, The Essex Institute, Massachusetts.
