= Carl Rogers Darnall =

United States Army general

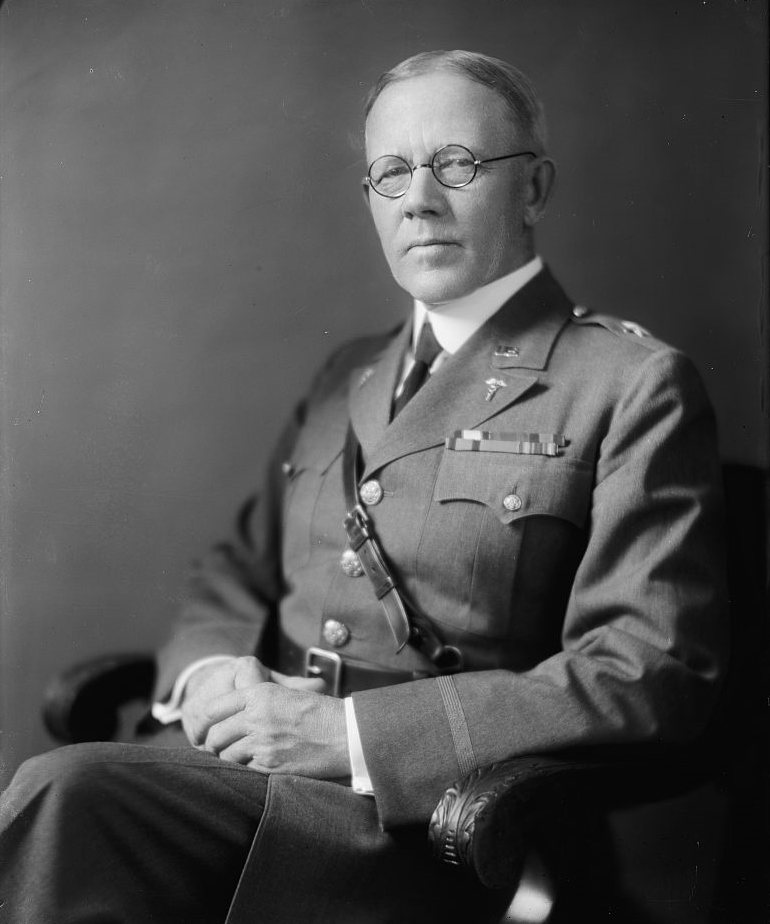
- Brigadier General Carl Rogers Darnall
- Born: December 25, 1867; Weston, Texas
- Died: January 18, 1941 (aged 73); Washington, D.C.
- Burial place: Arlington National Cemetery
- Military career
- Allegiance: United States of America
- Branch: United States Army
- Service years: 1896–1931
- Rank: Brigadier General
- Commands: Army Medical Center
- Wars: Spanish–American War; Boxer Rebellion; World War I
- Awards: Distinguished Service Medal

Brigadier General Carl Rogers Darnall (December 25, 1867, in Weston, Texas – January 18, 1941, in Washington, D.C.) was a United States Army chemist and surgeon credited with originating the technique of liquid chlorination of drinking water. Chlorination has been an exceedingly important innovation in public health, saving innumerable lives.

== Biography ==
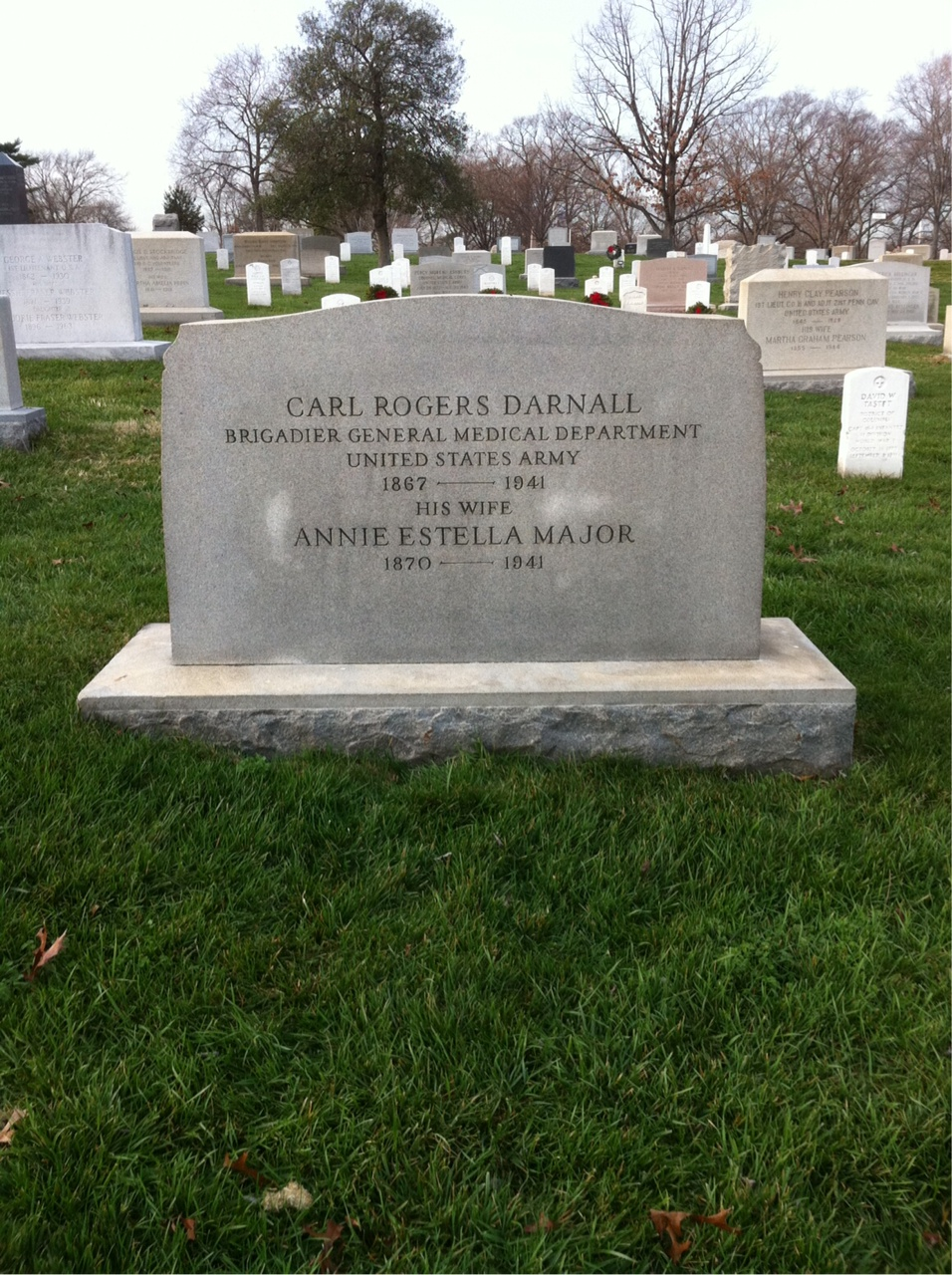
Grave at Arlington National Cemetery

=== Youth and education ===
Darnall was born on his father's farm in the Cottage Hill community near McKinney, in Collin County, Texas. He was the eldest of the seven children of Reverend Joseph Rogers Darnall, minister of the Christian Church, and Mary Ellen (Thomas) Darnall.

He studied at Carlton College, Bonham, Texas, and Transylvania University, Lexington, Kentucky and received a Doctor of Medicine degree from Jefferson Medical College, Philadelphia (1890). In 1892, he married Annie Estella Major of Erwinna, Pennsylvania. In 1896, after a few years of private practice, he was commissioned a first lieutenant and assistant surgeon in the U.S. Army. He graduated from the Army Medical School in Washington the following year.

=== Early career ===
Darnall lived in Milford, New Jersey from 1889 to 1896 and established his first practice there. His later assignments were to stations in Texas – Fort Clark at Brackettville, and Fort McIntosh at Laredo. During the Spanish–American War (1898), Darnall served in Cuba. Later, he served as an operating surgeon and pathologist aboard the hospital ship USS Relief in the Philippines and commanded the hospital at Iloilo. He was one of the few medical officers that accompanied the Allied Forces during the Boxer Rebellion in China.

=== Chlorination ===
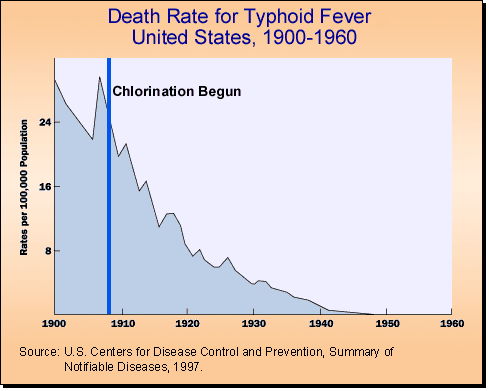

In 1902, Darnall returned to Washington, D.C., and served as secretary of the faculty and instructor for sanitary chemistry and operative surgery at the Army Medical School. It was while a major and a professor of chemistry there that he demonstrated the value of anhydrous, liquefied chlorine in purifying water. His 1910 invention, the mechanical liquid chlorine purifier (known as a "chlorinator"), was the prototype of the technology that is now applied to municipal water supplies throughout the world. Darnall also devised and patented a water filter that was used by the Army for many years. Major William Lyster further adapted the process of water chlorination to field use by inventing a method to apply sodium hypochlorite in a cloth bag, known as a Lyster bag.

=== Later career ===
Darnall was promoted to colonel in 1917. During World War I, Darnall's talents for business and organization were recognized, and he was assigned to the Finance and Supply Division in the Office of the Surgeon General (OTSG). After the war, he served as department surgeon in Hawaii. In 1925, he returned to the OTSG as executive officer. In November (or December 5?), 1929, he was promoted to brigadier general and became the commanding general of the Army Medical Center, a post he held until he retired on December 31, 1931.

Darnall died on 18 January 1941 at Walter Reed General Hospital, Washington, D.C. Six days earlier, his wife had died at the family home in Washington. They left three sons, Joseph Rogers (1894–1976), William Major (b. 1895), and Carl Robert (b. 1904), all of whom served in some capacity in the Army. He is buried in the Arlington National Cemetery in Arlington, Virginia.

== Awards and honors ==
Darnall was a Fellow of the American College of Surgeons, a member of the American Medical Association and Association of Military Surgeons of the United States. He was a veteran of the Military Order of the Carabao, member of the Army and Navy Club of Washington, and Founder Member of the Army and Navy Country Club. Darnall received the Distinguished Service Medal for his organizing, developing, and administering medical supplies during World War I.

== Legacy ==
- The Carl R. Darnall Army Medical Center at Fort Cavazos, Texas (established as the Darnall Army Community Hospital in 1965) is named in honor of Darnall.

== See also ==
- Frederick F. Russell
