= Walter Reed Tropical Medicine Course =

Walter Reed Army Institute of Research- GEIS 'Operational Clinical Infectious Disease' Course
- WRTMC
- Motto: Safiri Salama
- Type: Military
- Established: 1941
- Affiliations: Walter Reed Army Institute of Research; Naval Medical Research Center
- Director: COL Stephen Thomas
- Location: Silver Spring, Maryland, USA; 39.00505°N 77.05370°W

The Walter Reed Tropical Medicine Course (now called 'Operational Clinical Infectious Disease' Course ) at Walter Reed Army Institute of Research (WRAIR) is one of the many Tropical Medicine Training Courses available in the US and worldwide (see Tropical medicine). It is an intensive 5-day course and a 3-day short course, created to familiarize students with tropical diseases they may encounter overseas. The course is open to Physicians, Physician Assistants, Nurse Practitioners, ESO, 18D, or other medical personnel. The course is run by the military and designed for personnel of the US Military (Army, Marines, Navy, Air Force) and several other US government agencies.

== History ==
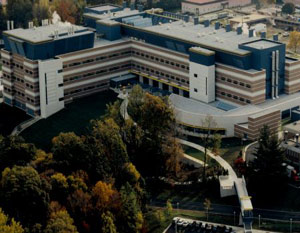
Location of the Walter Reed Tropical Medicine Course within Walter Reed Army Institute of Research

The Walter Reed Army Institute of Research (WRAIR) was established in 1893 as the Army Medical School by War Department General Orders No. 51, dated 24 Jan 1893. The Tropical Medicine course began in that school in July 1941 while BG G. Russell Callendar was commandant. At that time, the course ran for 30 days and consisted of didactic and laboratory sessions similar to today's course. Very much like the majority of the 52 years that this course was offered at WRAIR, that first course presented continuing education to approximately 30 officers.

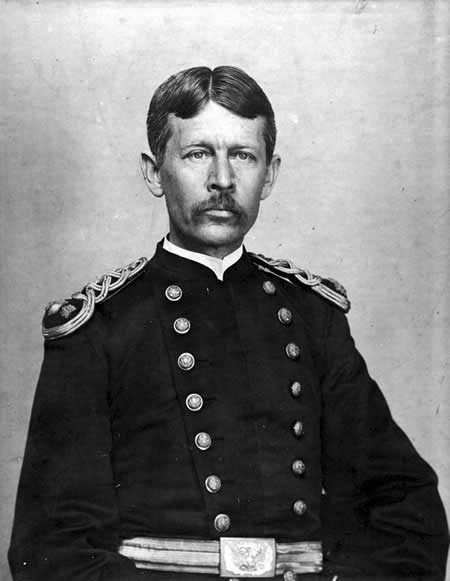
The course in named in honor of Walter Reed

Over the next fifty years, the course changed names and length but remained dedicated to teaching continuing tropical medicine education to military officers. In 1954, the institute began the “Advanced Military Preventive Medicine Course” which carried on the tropical medicine education tradition begun in 1941. This course was eventually supplanted by the “Global Medicine Course” in December 1966. During the next four and a half years, the Global Medicine course was offered on 8 separate occasions. This 12-week course was divided into 4 weeks of “Epidemiology and Applied Biostatistics”, 3 weeks of “Ecology and Disease”, and 5 weeks of “Tropical Medicine”. In February 1972, the Global Medicine course was split into a 5-week course called “Military Medical Ecology” and a 6-week course called the “Tropical Medicine Course”. The first Tropical Medicine Course was offered in July and August 1972 and was attended by 11 medical officers and 4 clinical clerks. The course endured until 1993 and was the only surviving remnant of the original Army Medical School educational offerings.

In 1991, the institute celebrated its 50-year tradition of tropical medicine education. In memory of his significant contributions to tropical medicine education, the institute established “The Colonel George W. Hunter III Certificate”. This award was to be presented yearly to no more than two course lecturers who embody excellence and longevity as senior lecturers in the course. The first two recipients of the award were Dr. Jay P. Sanford (former university president and dean of the medical school at the Uniformed Services University of the Health Sciences) and Dr. Theodore E. Woodward (emeritus professor of medicine at the University Of Maryland School of Medicine). A special presentation of this award was made to Colonel Richard N. Miller, former tropical medicine course director, for his significant contributions to this course and its organization over the previous 12 years. Due to the frequency of the course changing from once a year to once a quarter, the presentation frequency of the Hunter Certificate was changed to no more than 4 per year (one per course iteration). The 50-year celebration also was particularly honored by the commencement address given by Dr. Theodore E. Woodward who attended the first course in 1941.

Due to operational needs of the Special Operations Command and the newly formed Africa Command, in 2010 it was decided to resurrect the former 6 week course at WRAIR and convert it to a targeted short course that would provide a broader spectrum of individuals with the knowledge they need to combat international infectious disease threats. Operational demands upon the U.S. military facing wars on multiple fronts in areas affected with tropical disease identified a vital need for an intensely focused short course to familiarize medical personnel at all educational levels in tropical medicine.

In 2014 the Walter Reed Tropical Medicine Course was renamed 'Operational Clinical Infectious Disease' (OCID) Course.

=== Recipients of "The Colonel George W. Hunter III Certificate" ===
- 1991: Dr. Theodore E. Woodward, Nobel Prize nominee for his work with typhoid fever
- 1991: Dr. Jay P. Sanford, author of the Sanford Guide
- 1991: Colonel Richard N. Miller, course director
- 1994: Dr. Stephen L. Hoffman, malaria vaccine researcher
- 2011: COL Peter J. Weina, course director, malaria and leishmaniaisis researcher
- 2013: Dr. Dale C. Smith, professor, Department of Medical History, USUHS
- 2013: Juan Méndez, laboratory instructor, research zoologist, Leishmaniasis Diagnosis and Research
- 2013: RADM Boris D. Lushniak, acting surgeon general, U.S. Public Health Service
- 2013: CAPT Philip Coyne, professor, Department of Preventive Medicine and Biometrics, USPHS, USUHS
- 2014: COL Arthur G. Lyons, Dengue researcher and lecturer, Pentagon Clinic

== Offshoots ==
Hunter's Tropical Medicine: "Hunter’s Tropical Medicine grew out of a World War II Army Medical School tropical and military medicine course taught at the Walter Reed Army Medical Center in Washington, D.C. The first edition, entitled A Manual of Tropical Medicine, was published in 1945 by three of the course instructors, Colonel Thomas T. Mackie, Major George W. Hunter III, and Captain C. Brooke Worth. A second edition was published by the same authors in 1954. Colonel Hunter was joined by co-authors from the Louisiana State University School of Medicine for the third, fourth, and fifth editions, published in 1960, 1966, and 1976, respectively. George Hunter’s contribution was acknowledged by adding his name to the book title in the sixth edition, edited in 1984."

== See also ==
- Walter Reed Army Institute of Research
- Naval Medical Research Center
- Tropical medicine
- American Society of Tropical Medicine and Hygiene
- Walter Reed Army Medical Center
