= Henry Clay Vedder =

Henry Clay Vedder (February 26, 1853 – October 13, 1935) was an American Baptist church historian, seminary professor, editor and theologian. Vedder authored numerous articles and twenty-seven books on church history and theology.

== Early life and education ==
Vedder was born in De Ruyter, New York. He graduated from the University of Rochester with an A.B. in 1873, an A.M. in 1876 and a D.D. in 1897. He also graduated from the Rochester Theological Seminary in 1876. In 1894, Vedder accepted ordination into the Baptist ministry.

== Career ==
He was an editor at the New York Baptist newspaper The Examiner from 1876 to 1894 and the Baptist Quarterly Review from 1929 to 1935.

In 1894, he became professor of church history at Crozer Theological Seminary in Upland, Pennsylvania, and served in that capacity until 1926. After his retirement from the Crozer Theological Seminary, Vedder joined the editorial staff of the Chester Times newspaper in Chester, Pennsylvania. In addition to numerous articles, Vedder authored twenty-seven books.

Vedder shifted from orthodoxy to evangelical liberalism and became the subject of criticism by fundamentalists in the 1920s. Between 1908 and 1912 Vedder began to embrace socialism, evolution and pragmatism, a new interpretation of the atonement, and salvation as both individual and social. Vedder joined "social gospel" efforts with theologian Walter Rauschenbusch.

Vedder was a member of the American Society of Church History.

== Personal life ==
Vedder was married to Minnie Lingham Vedder and together they had a son Edward Bright Vedder who became a U.S. Army physician and noted researcher of beriberi.

Vedder died in Chester Hospital and is interred at the Chester Rural Cemetery in Chester, Pennsylvania.

Four generations of Vedders have attended the University of Rochester including Henry Clay Vedder's son, Edward Bright Vedder who graduated in 1898, his grandson Henry Clay Vedder II attended the school before graduating from George Washington University and his great grandson, Henry Clay Vedder III graduated in 1998.

== Bibliography ==
- Baptists and Liberty of Conscience (Cincinnati, J.R. Baumes, 1883)
- A Short History of the Baptists (1891, revised edition 1897, new edition, 1907)
- The Higher Criticism (1892)
- The dawn of Christianity, or, Studies of the apostolic church, (Philadelphia, American Baptist Publication Society, 1894)
- American Writers of To-Day (1894, new edition, 1910)
- A History of the Baptists of the Middle States (1898)
- Historical Leaflets, Issues 1-9, (Chester, Pennsylvania, Crozer Theological Seminary, 1901)
- The Story of the Churches - The Baptists, (The Baker & Taylor Co., 1902)
- Balthasar Hübmaier: the Leader of the Anabaptists (New York, London, G.P. Putnam's Sons, 1905)
- Our New Testament; how did we get it?, (New York, The Griffith & Rowland Press, 1908)
- Christian Epoch Makers (1908)
- Church History Handbooks, (The Griffith & Rowland Press, four volumes, 1909)
- Socialism and the Ethics of Jesus, (1912)
- The Gospel of Jesus and the Problems of Democracy (New York, The Macmillan company, 1914)
- The Reformation in Germany, Macmillan Company, (1914)
- The fundamentals of Christianity; a study of the teachings of Jesus and Paul, (New York, The Macmillan company, 1922)
