= Richard N. Miller =

American physician

Richard N. Miller is the director of the Medical Follow-up Agency of the Institute of Medicine. Miller possess an extensive background in preventive medicine and military medicine. He provided testimony about Gulf War Syndrome before the Committee on Government Reform and Oversight in 1998. He served for almost 30 years in the United States Army and reached the rank of colonel. While in the Army, Miller served as a public health officer in the Canal Zone, Republic of Panama; in Thailand; and in Germany. He also served as the director of the Walter Reed Tropical Medicine Course and as the director of the Preventive Medicine Residency at the Walter Reed Army Institute of Research.

== See also ==
- Walter Reed Tropical Medicine Course, former Course Director and recipient of "The Colonel George W. Hunter III Certificate"
