= Frederick F. Russell =

American virologist (1870–1960)

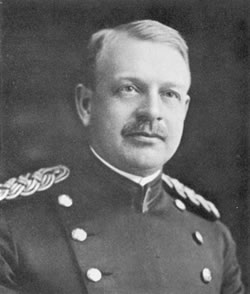
- Frederick F. Russell
- Born: 17 August 1870; Auburn, New York
- Died: December 29, 1960 (aged 90)
- Education: Columbia University
- Known for: Developing typhoid vaccination program in U.S. Army
- Awards: Public Welfare Medal (1935); Buchanan Medal (1937)
- Scientific career
- Fields: medicine

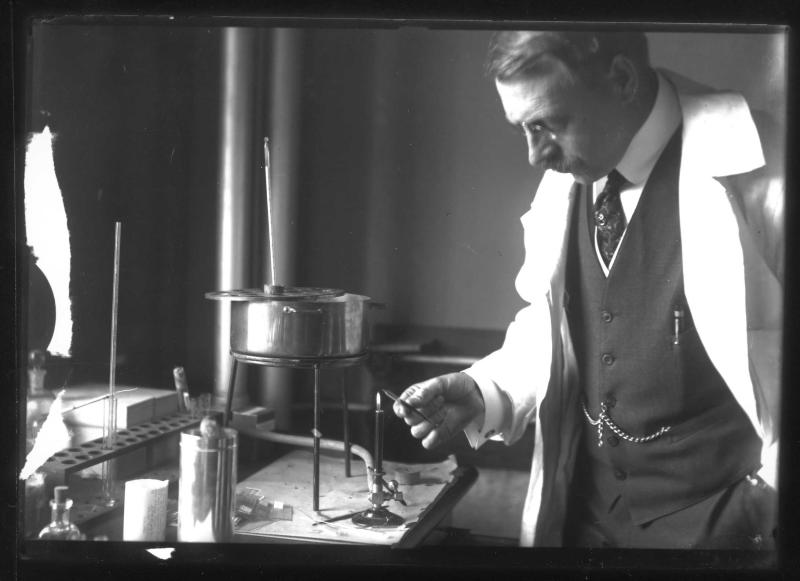
Major F.F. Russell with Wright blood tube

Brigadier General Frederick Fuller Russell (1870 – December 29, 1960) was a U.S. Army physician who perfected a typhoid vaccine in 1909. In 1911, a typhoid vaccination program was carried out to have the entire U.S. Army immunized. As a direct result of his research, the U.S. Army was the first military to make vaccination a required prophylaxis against typhoid. The 1911 measure eliminated typhoid as a significant cause of morbidity and mortality among U.S. military personnel.

== Biography ==
Russell was born in Auburn, New York in 1870. After graduating from Cornell University in 1891, Russell received his Doctor of Medicine from Columbia University in 1893 and his Doctor of Science from George Washington University in 1917. In 1898, he was commissioned as first lieutenant in the Medical Corps of the U.S. Army.

It was during his time as a Medical Corps officer that he began his research into the inoculation of soldiers against typhoid. In 1908, Surgeon General O'Reilly sent Russell to England to observe the work of Sir Almroth Wright, Professor at the Royal Army Medical College, who had been experimenting with a method of prophylaxis with killed culture of typhoid organisms to immunize against the disease. Upon Russell's return, he submitted a report on Wright's research, which O'Reilly considered "a very valuable treatise on the epidemiology of this disease". He conducted trials at the Army Medical Museum comparing the efficacy of both an orally administered and an injected vaccine. He packed the vaccine in small single dosage using small glass ampoules which, unlike the 1 liter flasks used in the United Kingdom, ensured that all of the typhoid micro-organisms were killed.

Hypodermic Syringe used in typhoid vaccination clinical trials at the Army Medical Museum in March 1909. (Historical Collections, National Museum of Health and Medicine, M-179.00111)

As a result of the report, Russell was assigned the duty of implementing an immunization program within the U.S. Army. In 1910 he inoculated his first group of volunteers and by 1911 vaccination became compulsory. From a morbidity of 173 cases in 1910, Russell was able to reduce the total to nine cases in 1912 with only one death.

During his career he served as curator of the Army Medical Museum from 1907 to 1911, instructor in the Army Medical School, and professor of pathology and bacteriology at George Washington University. In addition, he served on various investigating boards, one of which he was able to advise and offer technical counsel to Major Carl Darnall in the development of a water filter for field use and the first water chlorinator using gaseous chlorine.

After his resignation from the Army in 1921, Russell returned to the rolls as a reserve officer and in November 1920 was appointed Brigadier General of the Medical Officers Reserve Corps. Following his military career he served as the director of the International Health Board of the Rockefeller Foundation. As director, Russell continued his research into public health focusing on diseases such as yellow fever. In 1935 he was awarded the Public Welfare Medal from the National Academy of Sciences. He spent the final years (1936–39) of his career in medical science and administration as professor of epidemiology and preventive medicine at Harvard Medical School and Harvard School of Public Health. In 1942, he was presented with the Gorgas Medal from the Association of Military Surgeons of the United States (AMSUS).
