= Joseph Franklin Siler =

U.S. Army physician

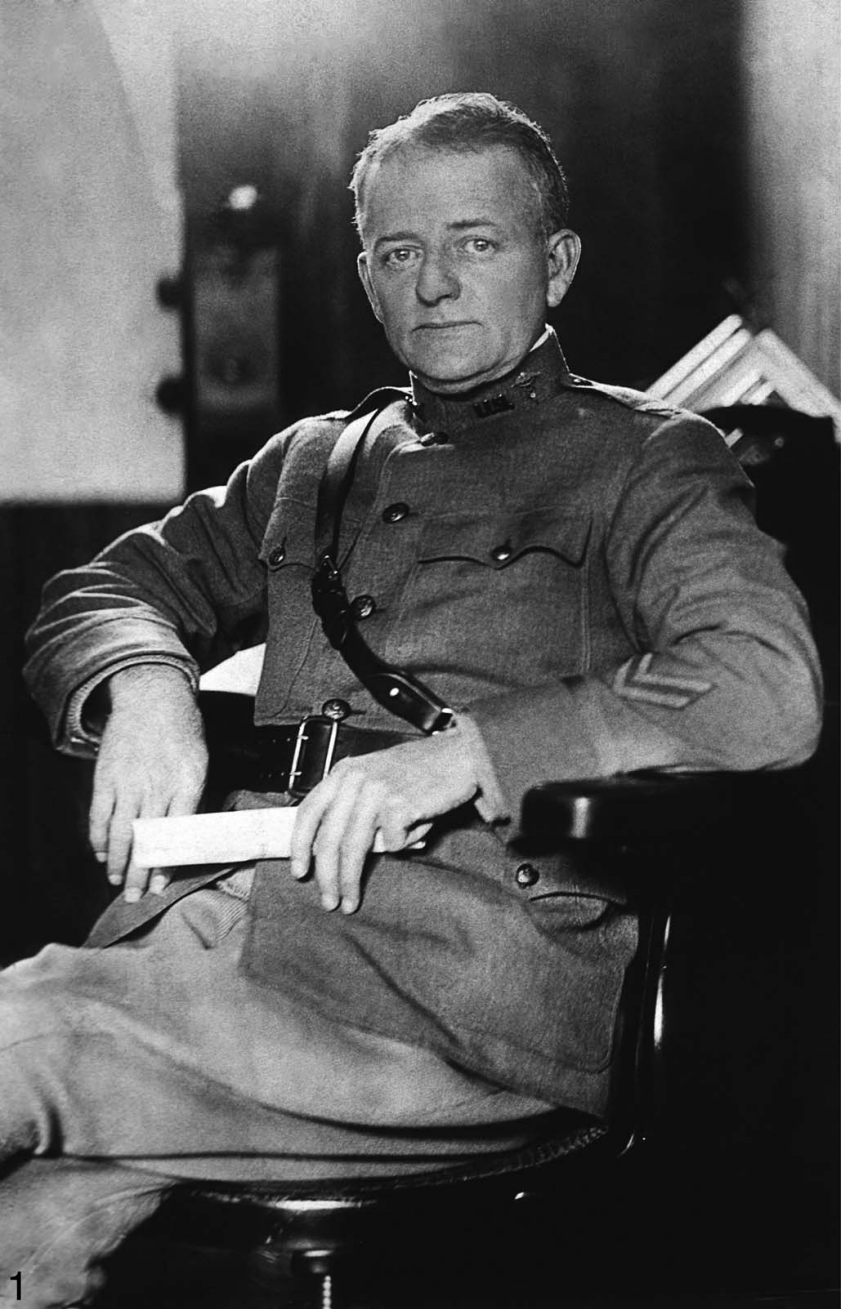
Colonel Joseph Siler, MD

Colonel Joseph Franklin Siler, MD (1875–1960) was a U.S. Army physician noted for investigations of mosquito transmission of dengue fever in the Philippines and for Marijuana Smoking in Panama, one of the first experimental reports on cannabis.

Siler was commander the Laboratory Service in the American Expeditionary Forces in France in World War I and undertook extensive experimental observations on the manufacture and immunizing efficacy of anti-typhoid vaccines.

== See also ==
- Army Medical School
