= Cannabis and the United States military =

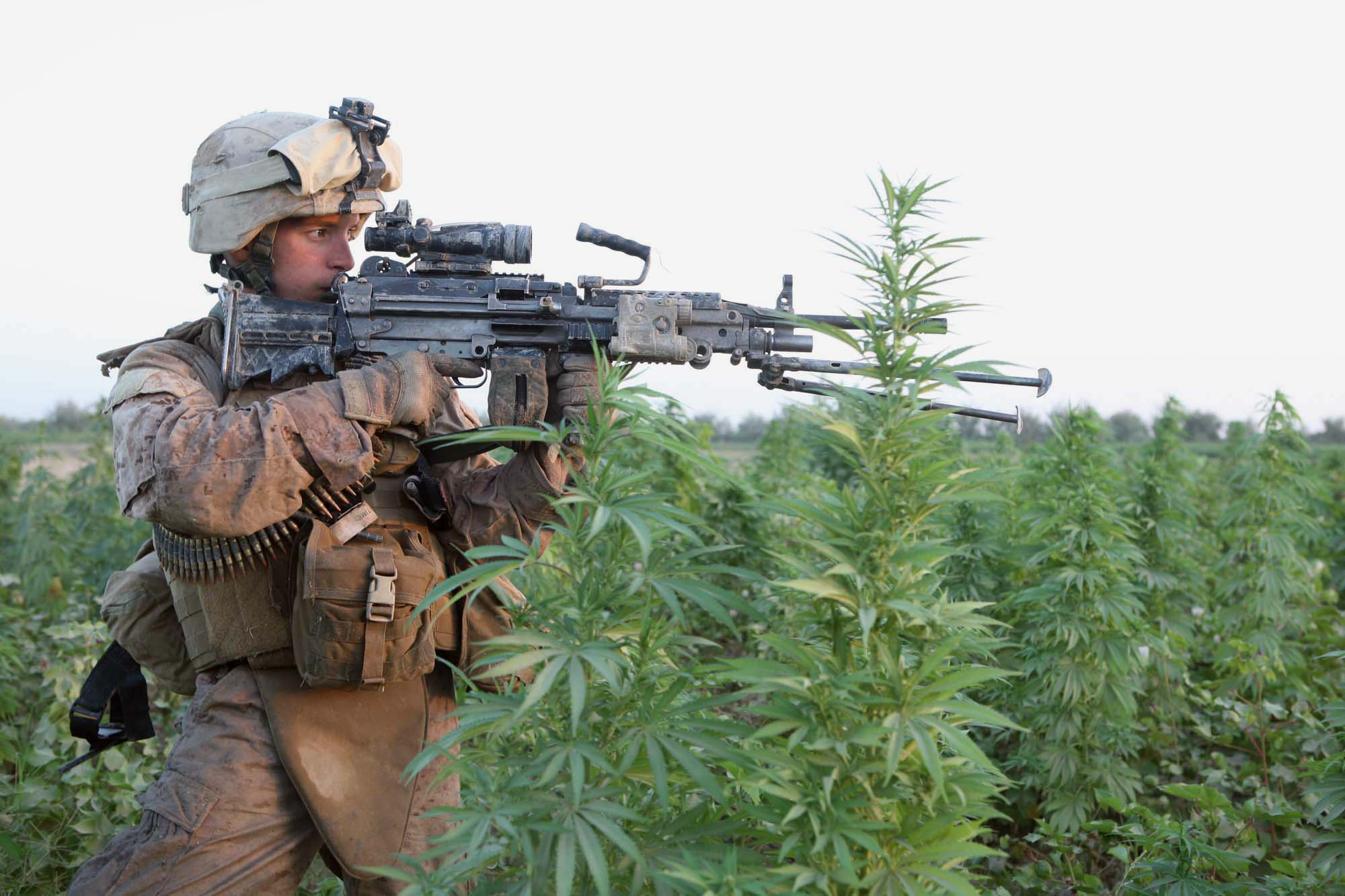
US Marine patrolling through a cannabis field in Afghanistan, 2010

Cannabis usage is currently prohibited in the United States military, but historically it has been used recreationally by some troops, and some cannabis-based medicines were used in the military as late as the twentieth century.

== Military medicine ==
In 1909, a military manual from the Mounted Service School in Fort Riley recommended cannabis indica for treating abdominal pains in horses, or to supplement ether for treating spasms. During World War I, military doctors recommended that the American Expeditionary Force carry cannabis indica tablets to treat headaches, insomnia, and cramps.

== Drug use in Panama and investigations ==
Some of the earliest reports of recreational cannabis use in the military came from the Panama Canal Zone in 1916, where troops were noted to be using the drug. Also in 1916, thousands of US troops used marijuana while in Mexico on General John Pershing's punitive expedition against Pancho Villa (1916–1917). In 1921, the commanding officer of Fort Sam Houston in San Antonio, Texas, prohibited the use of cannabis on the base.

A 1933 report by the U.S. Army Medical Corps published in the publication Military Surgeon, titled Marijuana Smoking in Panama, based on a study of U.S. Army personnel in the Panama Canal Zone, found that cannabis was generally not addictive and was less harmful to soldiers than alcohol. The report recommended that use of cannabis on military bases should continue to be prohibited, but outside of these areas there should be no further restriction.

== Industrial hemp ==
The Rens Hemp Company of Brandon, Wisconsin, closed in 1958, was the last legal hemp producer nationwide in operation following World War II. Prior to its 1957 shutdown, Rens had been the primary provider of hemp rope for the United States Navy.

== Edgewood Arsenal human experiments ==
From the 1950s to the 1970s, Edgewood Arsenal conducted experiments on human subjects with cannabis and its derivatives. One study indicated "no loss of motivation or performance after two years of heavy (military sponsored) smoking of marihuana."

== Vietnam War ==
Though alcohol was the drug most commonly used by American troops in the Vietnam War, cannabis was the second-most common. Initially rates of usage among deployed soldiers were comparable to those of their stateside peers, with 29% of troops departing Vietnam in 1967 reporting having ever used marijuana in their lives. A 1976 study however showed that from 1967 to 1971, the proportion of troops having used marijuana peaked at 34% before stabilizing to 18%, while the number of troops who had used cannabis prior to deployment stayed around 8%. Cannabis use by troops in Vietnam was generally dealt with using Article 15 non-judicial punishment in units such as the 101st Airborne.

During the Vietnam War period, cannabis use also became common among US forces in the United States and in Europe, with a 1971 article claiming that over 1,000 midshipmen at Annapolis Naval Academy used cannabis, and a survey in Germany showing that half of the soldiers in the surveyed battalion were regular cannabis users.
