= Army Medical Service (Germany) =

The red cross is used as the protective sign by the Army Medical Service

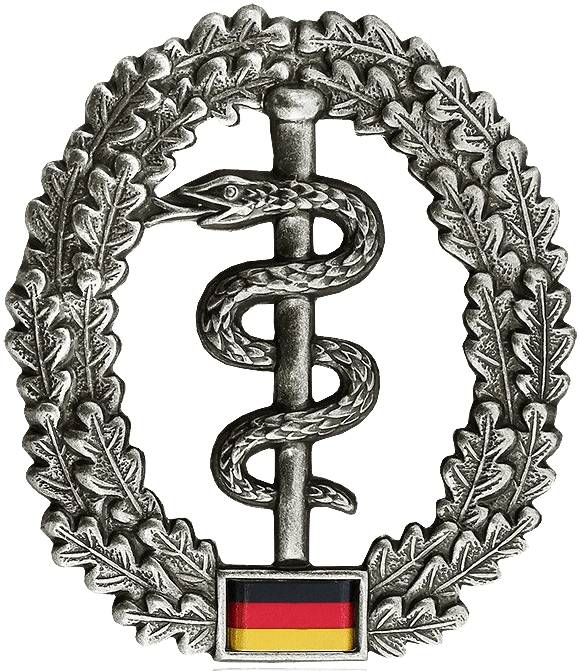
Beret insignia of the Army Medical Service

The Army Medical Service (German: Sanitätsdienst Heer or Sanitätsdienst des Heeres) is a non-combat specialty branch of the German Army traditionally responsible for providing medical services within the army, and which has a humanitarian function during armed conflicts in accordance with international humanitarian law, and specific rights and responsibilities under the Geneva Conventions, their additional protocols and customary international humanitarian law. It is entitled under international humanitarian law to use the red cross as a protective sign and its personnel are protected persons under international humanitarian law. Since 2002, most of its former responsibilities have been transferred to the Joint Medical Service. The Army Medical Service still exists as a small entity within the German military.

== History and organisation ==
The Army Medical Service has been a separate branch within the military since the German Empire. The first Army Medical Service was established in Prussia and Germany between 1868 and 1873, and was regulated by the Kriegssanitätsordnung für das deutsche Heer from 1878. Following German rearmament in the 1950s, the medical service was reestablished based on the traditional structure, with a medical service for each military branch. This changed in 2002, when the medical services were largely merged to form the Joint Medical Service, although the Army Medical Service still exists as a much smaller organisation.

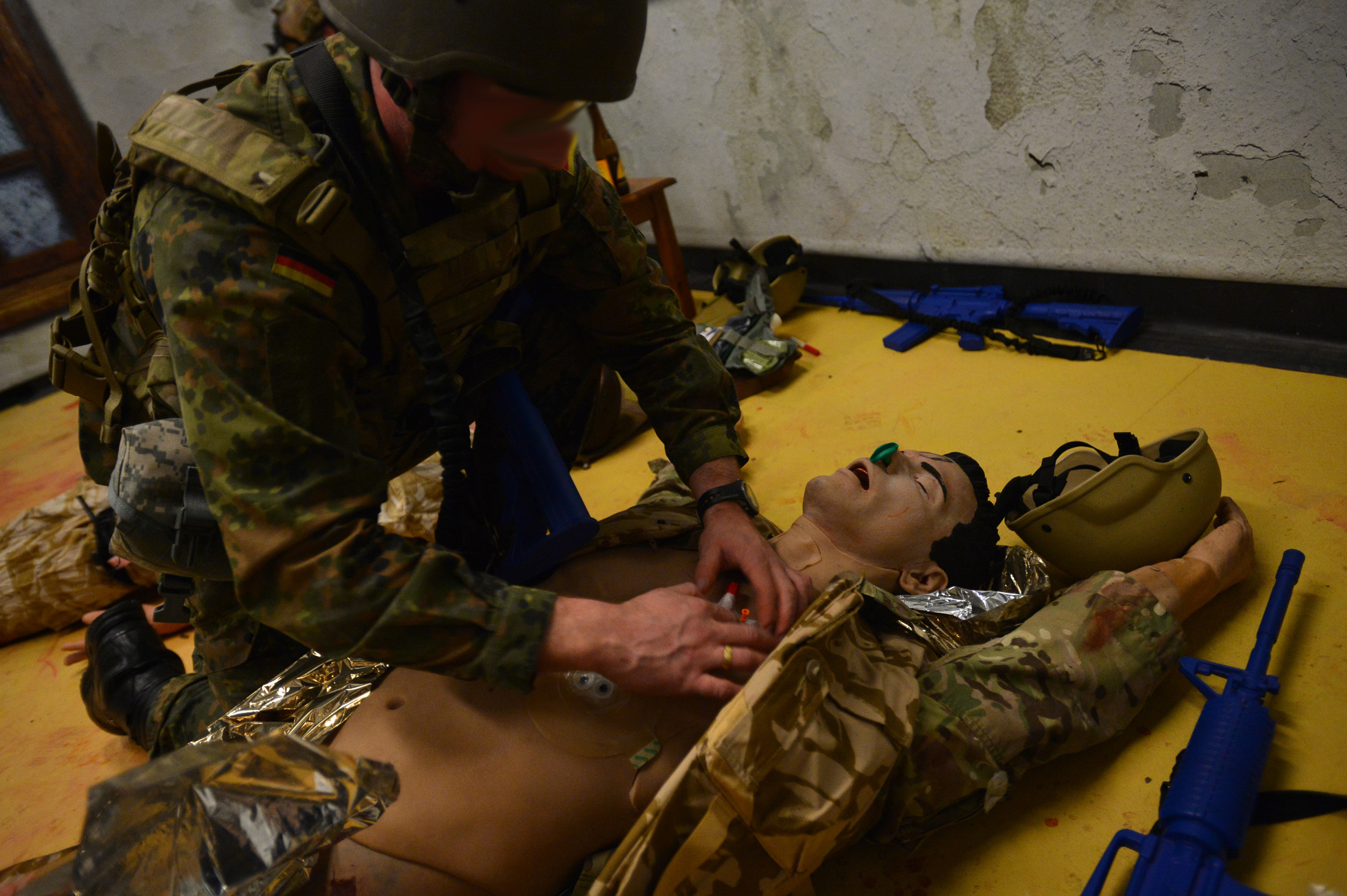
A German Army medic trains to save lives at the NATO Allied Centre for Medical Education at SHAPE, Belgium 2014

The Army Medical Service employs military physicians, nurses, combat medics and other groups, and is traditionally responsible for providing medical humanitarian relief in armed conflicts, including caring for sick or wounded soldiers on the battlefield and operating first aid stations and field hospitals near the frontline, as well as organising transports of patients. Other responsibilities include occupational health services, medical disaster relief and international humanitarian missions in non-combat situations.

Members of the Medical Service are often informally and affectionately referred to as "Sanis" in German.

== Status under international humanitarian law ==
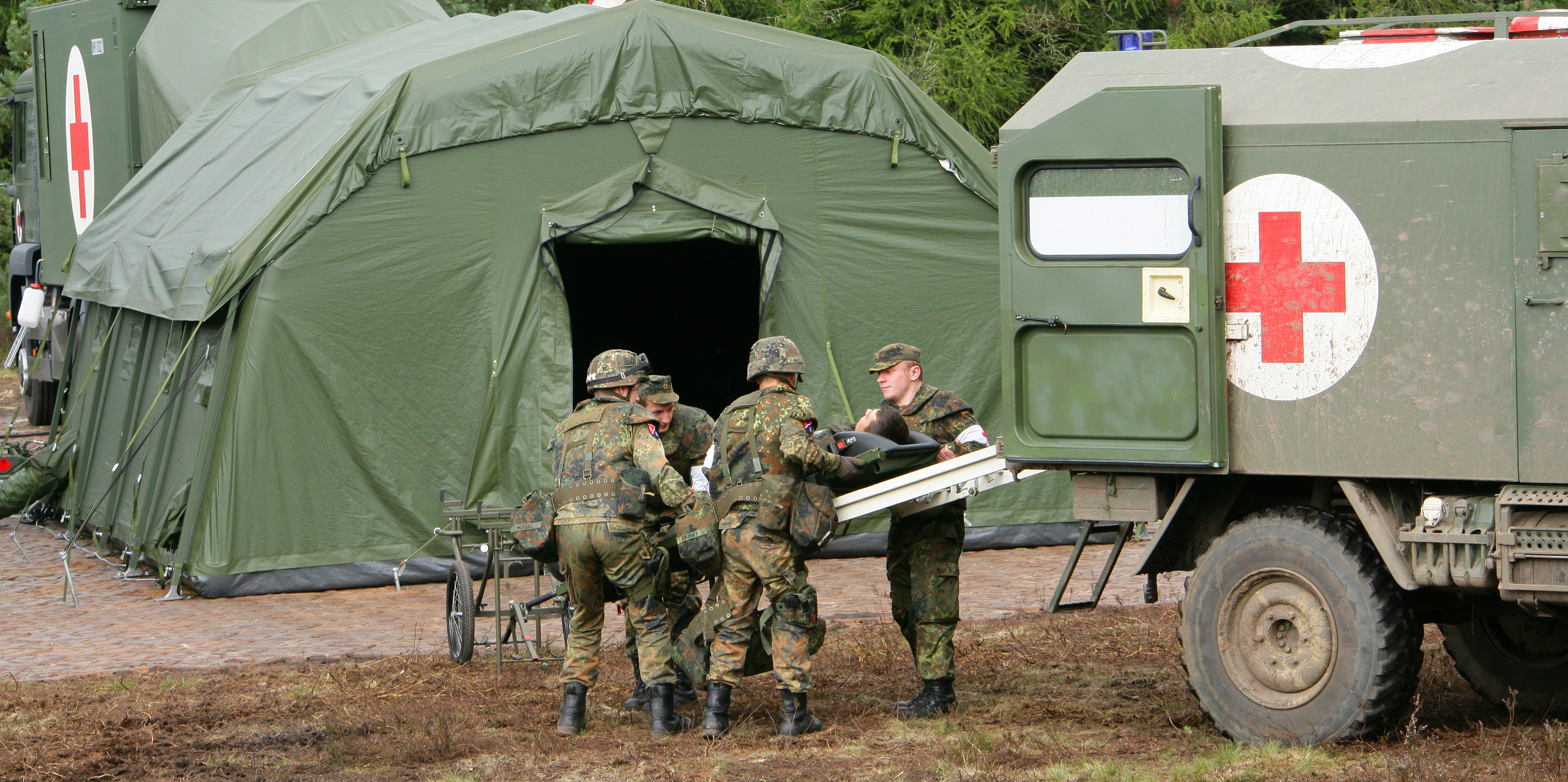
Personnel, facilities and ambulance of the Army Medical Service, which all display the red cross as a protective sign, during a military exercise, 2010

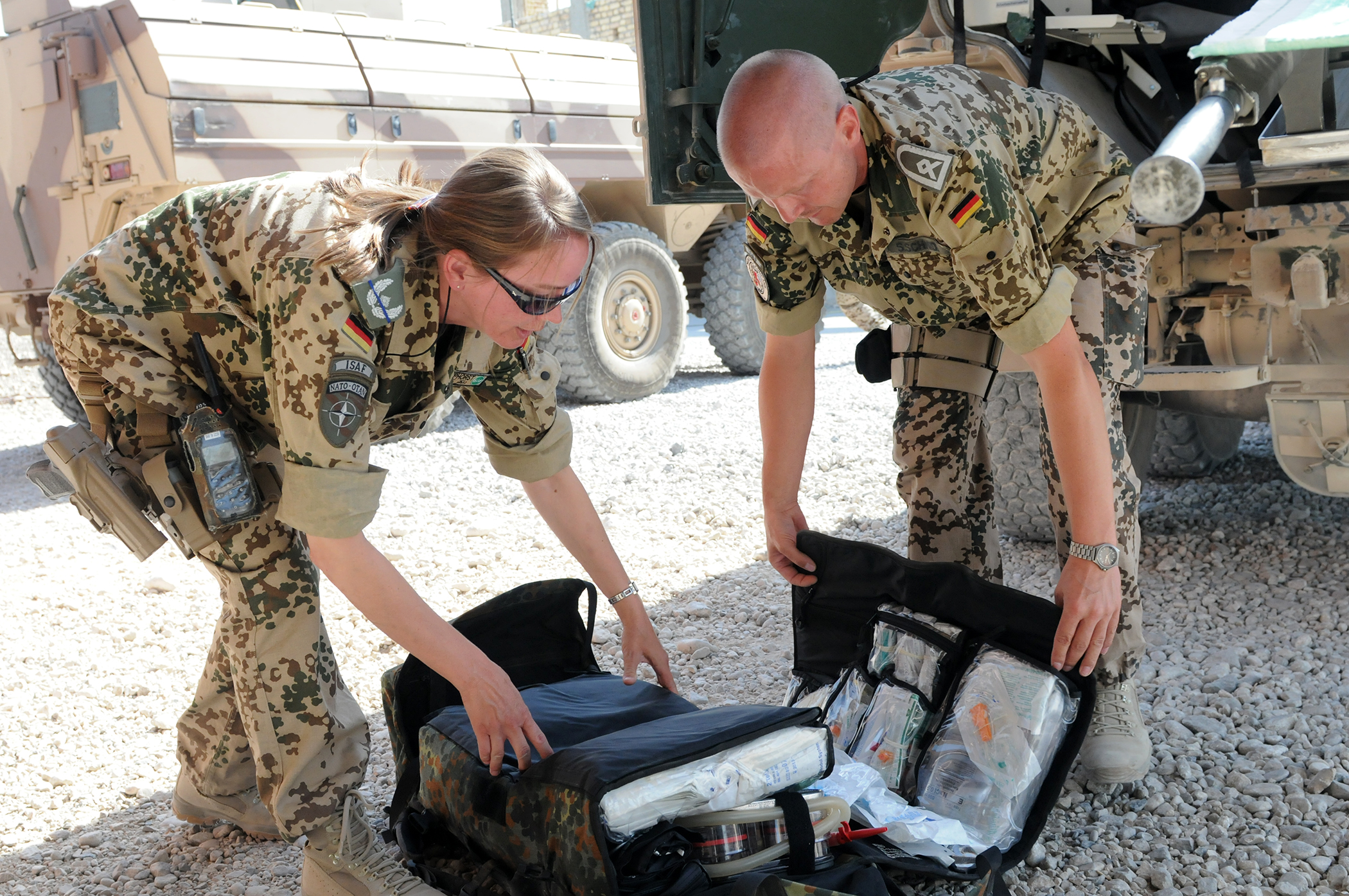
A German female major and army doctor serving in the ISAF force in Afghanistan, wearing camouflage uniform

When carrying out their humanitarian function during armed conflicts, medical personnel are protected persons under international humanitarian law, and are entitled under the laws of war to carry out their work without being inhibited; they may not be attacked, harmed, taken as prisoners of war or persecuted in any way; deliberately attacking or hindering medical personnel from performing their humanitarian work is a serious war crime. The same protection extends to buildings and vehicles identified as part of the medical service. The Army Medical Service uses the red cross as a protective sign recognised under the laws of war; the sign is used on buildings and vehicles and may be worn on armbands as needed. Personnel are issued identity cards identifying them as protected persons under the Geneva Conventions. Although personnel of the Army Medical Service are members of the armed forces and hold military ranks, they are considered non-combatants under international humanitarian law and thus enjoy protection and neutrality because of their humanitarian duties. The status of medical personnel as protected persons goes back to the 1864 Geneva Convention and was repeated in the subsequent Geneva Conventions of 1906 and 1929. It is currently set forth in the First, Second and Fourth Geneva Conventions of 1949, their additional protocols and is recognised under customary international humanitarian law, specifically by rules 25 and 26.

Personnel of the Medical Service using the protective sign are prohibited under the laws of war from taking part in combat action, and facilities or vehicles identified in that way may not be used for military operations. Medical units and personnel also lose their protection under international humanitarian law if they commit acts harmful to the enemy outside their humanitarian function, as set forth e.g. by the First Geneva Convention, Additional Protocols I and II, as well as by rule 25 of customary international humanitarian law. However, medical personnel may be armed, usually with service pistols, for the purpose of self defense or the defense of patients, and their facilities (such as hospitals) may be guarded for the same defensive purpose.

== Ranks ==
The lowest rank of the Army Medical Service is Sanitätssoldat (OR-1), i.e. private (literally "medical service soldier"). The other non-commissioned ranks are the same as the ones used by the Army.

Commissioned officers use ranks that are specific to the Medical Service, starting from the rank of Stabsarzt (OF-2), i.e. captain. The historical ranks Unterarzt, Assistenzarzt and Oberarzt are no longer used as military ranks; Assistenzarzt and Oberarzt are however commonly used as job titles at hospitals, including military hospitals.

The current and historical officer ranks specific to the Medical Service are:

NATO code	Human Medicine	Dentistry	Pharmacy	Veterinary	Regular Army ranks	English translations
OR7	Unterarzt	Unterarzt	Unterapotheker	Unterveterinär	Oberfähnrich	Officer Aspirant
OF-1b	Assistenzarzt	Assistenzarzt	Assistenzapotheker	Assistenzveterinär	Leutnant	Second Lieutenant
OF-1a	Oberarzt	Oberarzt	Oberapotheker	Oberveterinär	Oberleutnant	First Lieutenant
OF-2	Stabsarzt	Stabsarzt	Stabsapotheker	Stabsveterinär	Hauptmann	Captain
OF-3	Oberstabsarzt	Oberstabsarzt	Oberstabsapotheker	Oberstabsveterinär	Major	Major
OF-4	Oberfeldarzt	Oberfeldarzt	Oberfeldapotheker	Oberfeldveterinär	Oberstleutnant	Lieutenant Colonel
OF-5	Oberstarzt	Oberstarzt	Oberstapotheker	Oberstveterinär	Oberst	Colonel
OF-6	Generalarzt	Generalarzt	Generalapotheker	–	Brigadegeneral	Brigadier General
OF-7	Generalstabsarzt	–	–	–	Generalmajor	Major General
OF-8	Generaloberstabsarzt	–	–	–	Generalleutnant	Lieutenant General
