= Erich Hippke =

Chief of Luftwaffe Medical Inspectorate (1888–1969)

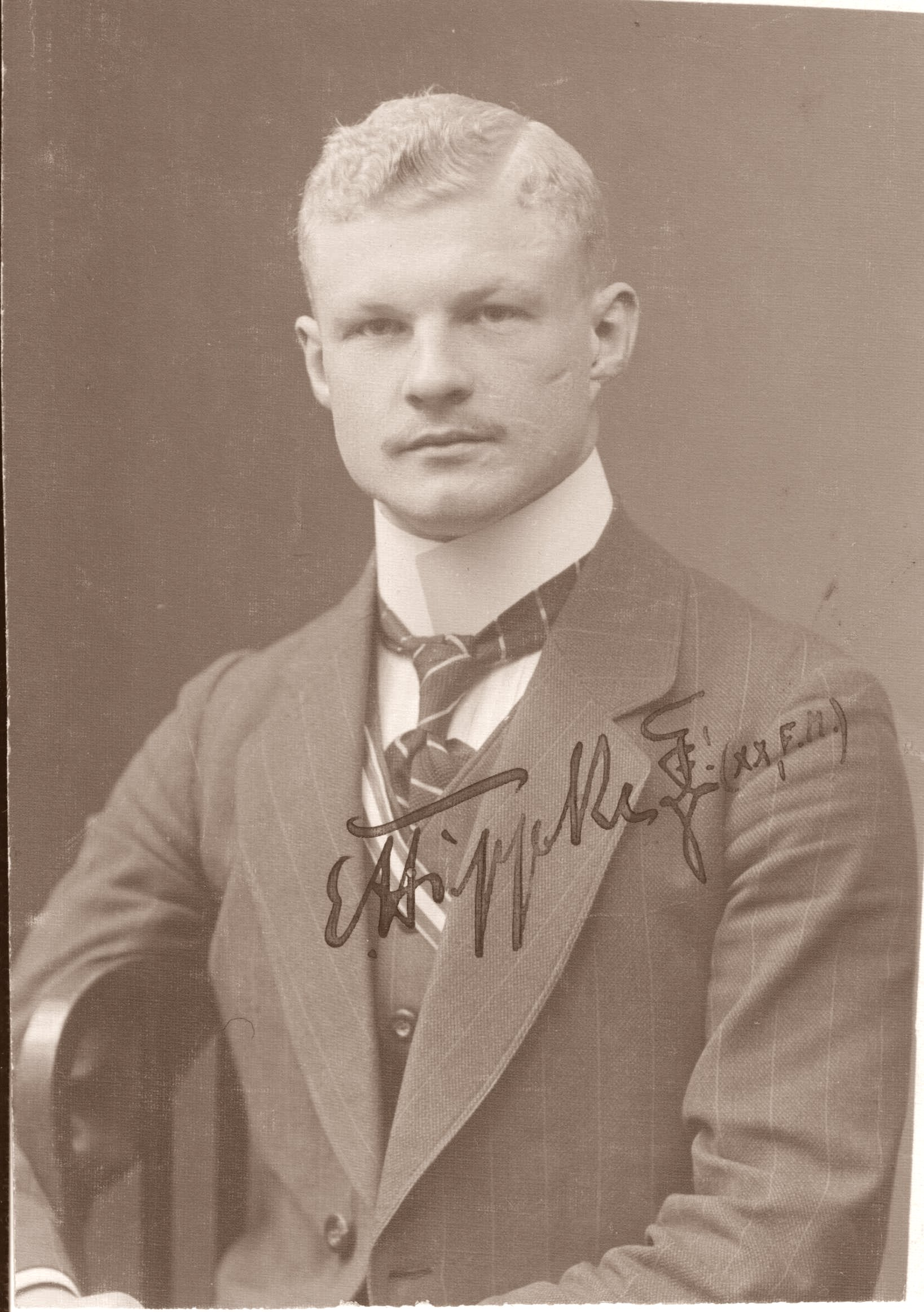
- Hippke in 1908
- Born: 7 March 1888; Estate Prökuls, Kreis Memel, Province of East Prussia, Kingdom of Prussia, German Empire
- Died: 10 June 1969 (aged 81); Bonn, North Rhine-Westphalia, West Germany
- Military career
- Allegiance: German Empire; Weimar Republic; Nazi Germany
- Branch: Prussian Army; Imperial German Army; Reichswehr; Luftwaffe
- Service years: 1907–1944
- Rank: Generaloberstabsarzt
- Commands: Chief Medical Officer of Luftwaffe
- Conflicts: World War I: Eastern front; Macedonian front; Palestine front; World War II
- Other work: Prof. h. c. Dr. med.

Erich Otto Wilhelm Felix Hippke (7 March 1888 – 10 June 1969) was a German Air Force General Surgeon with the rank of Generaloberstabsarzt. He is most noted as Chief Medical Officer of the Luftwaffe and subsequent Inspector of the Medical Matters for the Luftwaffe during World War II.

== Early military career ==
Erich Hippke was born on March 7, 1888, at the estate of Prökuls (Gut Prökuls), East Prussia as the son of forestry treasurer (Forstkassenrendanten) Wilhelm August Ferdinand Hippke and his wife Helene Eveline Auguste, née Labes.

On March 28, 1907, Erich enrolled into the Kaiser-Wilhelms-Akademie für das militärärztliche Bildungswesen (Kaiser Wilhelms Academy for military medical education; de), an elite academy for military surgeons in Berlin. Hippke joined the Prussian Army on April 1, 1907, and was officially assigned to the 4th Guard Infantry Regiment (4. Garde-Regiment zu Fuß, de) stationed in Berlin-Moabit.

On March 1, 1912, during his senior years in the academy, Hippke was commissioned Unterarzt (officer candidate) and assigned to Grenadier-Regiment 9. Hippke graduated on June 19, 1913, and served with his regiment in its garrisons to Stargard, Bromberg, and Demmin. He was also promoted to the rank of Assistenzarzt (equal to Leutnant) on August 18, 1913.

With his new promotion, Hippke transferred to the 54th Infantry Regiment "von der Goltz" (Infanterie-Regiment von der Goltz (7. Pommersches) Nr.54) stationed in Kolberg as a troop medic.

Due to the start of World War I, Hippke's regiment was sent to the Eastern front as a part of the 36th Reserve Division under the command of Generalleutnant Kurt Kruge (de). Hippke subsequently participated in the Battle of Gumbinnen and the Battle of Tannenberg. In September 1915, he was transferred to the Division Staff and appointed Adjutant to the Division Surgeon. In this capacity, Hippke was promoted to the rank of Oberarzt (Oberleutnant) on October 13, 1915, and saw combat in Galicia.

In October 1916, Hippke was transferred to the Heeresgruppe Below under the command of General Otto von Below, serving on the Macedonian front. Hippke spent almost a year with this unit before he was appointed Adjutant of the Army Surgeon within the 11th Army under the command of General Kuno von Steuben.

In July 1917, Hippke was sent to the Palestine front, where he was assigned to the staff of Heeresgruppe F under the command of General Erich von Falkenhayn. He was tasked again with the capacity of Adjutant of the Army Surgeon.

For his service during the War, Hippke was decorated with both classes of Iron Cross, the Prussian Red Cross Medal 3rd Class, and the Ottoman War Medal.

== World War II ==
During the time of Nazi Germany, from 1937 to December 1943, Hippke was the Chief Medical Officer of the Luftwaffe. He was also a member of the Board of Trustees of the Kaiser Wilhelm Institute for Brain Research. Hippke was the true source of the ideas for the so-called "freezing experiments" conducted on behalf of the Luftwaffe, at Dachau concentration camp by Sigmund Rascher.

He was succeeded by Oskar Schröder on May 15, 1944.

== Postwar ==
Hippke was arrested in December 1946. By this time, he was a general practitioner working in Hamburg. He avoided the Doctors' Trial and left Nuremberg without charge. He was never charged with a crime, but American investigators of Nazi medical atrocities later concluded that he was actually the source of the idea for the deadly "freezing experiments" on humans.

== Awards and decorations ==
- German Cross in Silver on March 20, 1944
- War Merit Cross (1939), 1st and 2nd class with Swords
- German Red Cross Decoration 1st Class
- Iron Cross (1914), 1st and 2nd class (World War I decoration)
- Prussian Red Cross Medal 3rd Class, (World War I decoration)
- Ottoman War Medal (World War I decoration)
- Spanish Cross in Bronze without Swords
- Honour Cross of the World War 1914/1918 (Ehrenkreuz für Frontkämpfer)
- Wehrmacht Long Service Award, 1st Class (Wehrmacht-Dienstauszeichnung)
- Anschluss Medal (Die Medaille zur Erinnerung an den 13. März 1938)
- Memel Medal (Medaille zur Erinnerung an die Heimkerhr des Memellandes 22. März 1939)
- Sudetenland Medal (Die Medaille zur Erinnerung an den 1. Oktober 1938)
- Grand Officer of the Italian Military Order of Savoy
- Imperial Order of the Yoke and the Arrows (Spain)
- Austrian World War I Medal with Swords
- Hungarian World War I Medal with Swords

== See also ==
- Doctors' Trial
- Nazi human experimentation

Military offices
Preceded by Newly created	Chief Medical Officer of Luftwaffe; 1 April 1935 – 31 January 1939	Succeeded by Oskar Schröder
