= Feldunterarzt =

Military rank in the German Wehrmacht

Field junior surgent Feldunterarzt (FUArzt/ FUA)
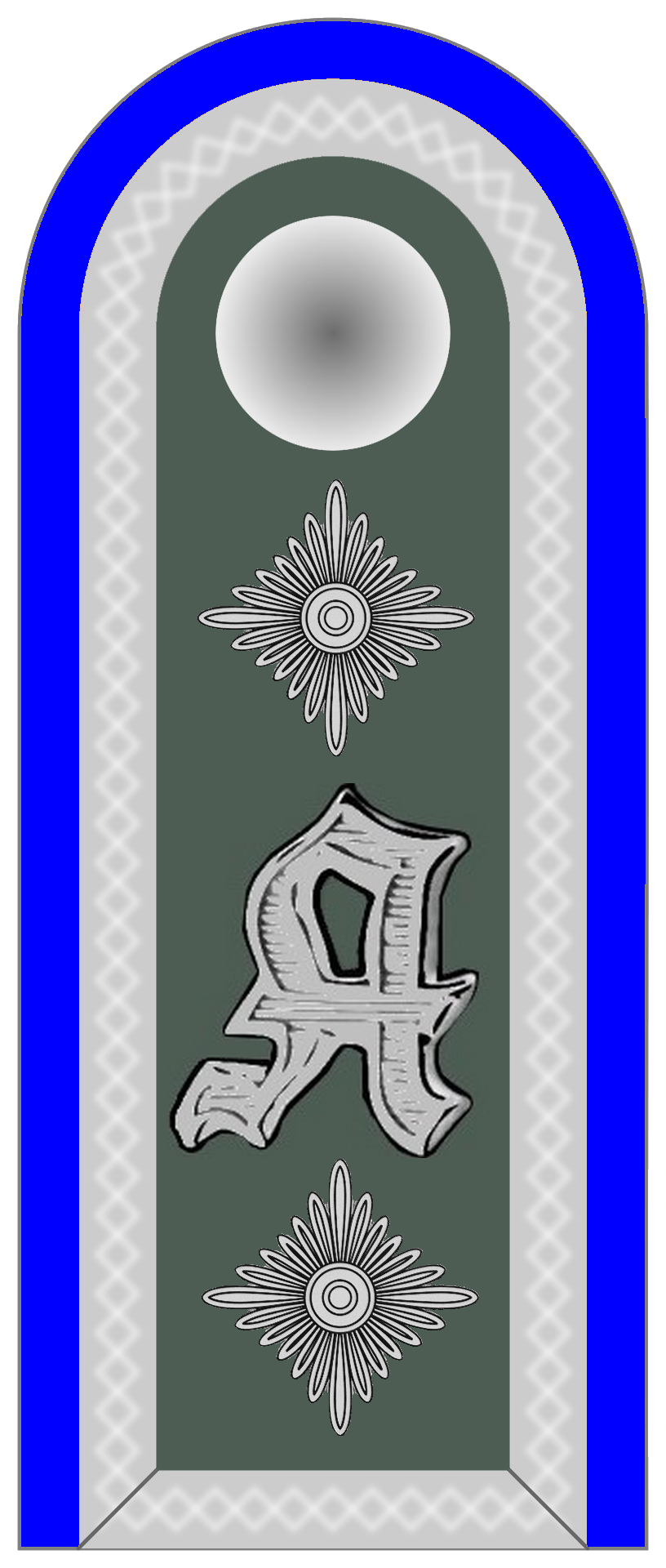
- Collar patches and shoulder board
- Country: Nazi Germany
- Service branch: Heer (Wehrmacht)
- Rank: Officer Aspirant
- Next higher rank: Assistenzarzt (OF-1)
- Next lower rank: no
- Equivalent ranks: See list

Feldunterarzt (short: FUArzt or FUA; literal: field under physician) was a military rank in the German Wehrmacht until 1945. It was established additional to the Unterarzt July 25, 1940. Uniform and shoulder board were identical to the Fahnenjunker-Oberfeldwebel (Oberfähnrich), however without the double Unteroffizier galloons. The Gothic letter A between the two silver feldwebel stars indicated the membership to the Military Medical Academy in Berlin. The Feldunterarzt was an officer aspirant (de: Offizier-Anwärter, short OA or O.A.) in the Military Health Service.

According to the rank hierarchy, it was comparable to Sergeant First Class (de: Oberfeldwebel) or Chief Petty Officer (de: Oberbootsmann)

== Wehrmacht ==
=== Heer ===
In line to the so-called Reichsbesoldungsordnung (en: Reich's salary order), appendixes to the Salary law of the German Empire (de: Besoldungsgesetz des Deutschen Reiches) of 1927 (changes 1937 – 1940), the comparative ranks were as follows: C 15

- Oberfeldwebel (Heer and Luftwaffe)
- Unterarzt (medical service of the Wehrmacht, with voller ärztlicher Approbation, i.e. full medical license)
  - Feldunterarzt, from 1940 (ranking below Unterarzt, with Physikum, i.e. first medical examination)
- Unterveterinär (veterinarian service of the Wehrmacht)

The corps colour of the Military Health System in German armed forces was traditional dark blue, and of the veterinarian service carmine red. This tradition was continued by the medical service corps in Heer and Luftwaffe of the Reichswehr and Wehrmacht. However, the corps colour of the Waffen-SS HSS was cornflower blue.

junior Rank no	German medical officer rank Feldunterarzt (Unterarzt)	senior Rank; Assistenzarzt

== Address ==
The manner of formal addressing of military surgeons/dentists with the rank Feldunterarzt was, „Herr Feldunterarzt“.

Ranks Wehrmacht until 1945				Ranks
Medical service	en translation	Equivalent Heer	en equivalent	Ranks
Generaloberstabsarzt	Senior Staff-Surgeon General	General der Waffengattung	three star rank	OF-8
Generalstabsarzt	Staff-Surgeon General	Generalleutnant	two star rank	OF-7
Generalarzt	Surgeon General	Generalmajor	one star rank	OF-6
Oberstarzt	Colonel (Dr.)	Oberst	Colonel	OF-5
Oberfeldarzt	Lieutenant colonel (Dr.)	Oberstleutnant	Lieutenant colonel	OF-4
Oberstabsarzt	Major (Dr.)	Major		OF-3
Stabsarzt	Captain (Dr.)	Hauptmann	Captain (army)	OF-2
Oberarzt	First lieutenant (Dr.)	Oberleutnant	First lieutenant	OF-1a
Assistenzarzt	Second lieutenant (Dr.)	Leutnant	Second lieutenant	OF-1b
Unterarzt	Sergeant 1st Class (Dr.)	Fahnenjunker-Oberfeldwebel (Oberfähnrich)	Officer Aspirant	OR-7
Feldunterarzt (from 1940)	Sergeant 1st Class (Dr.)	Fahnenjunker-Oberfeldwebel (Oberfähnrich)	Officer Aspirant	OR-7

== See also ==
- Corps colours of the German Army (1935–1945)
- Ranks and insignia of the German Army (1935–1945)
