= Stabsarzt =

Stabsarzt (short: StArzt or SA), in English Staff Surgeon, is a military commissioned officer rank in German speaking armed forces. In the German Bundeswehr and the former Wehrmacht and Reichswehr, it describes a qualified or licensed surgeon or dentist who practises military medicine, with a rank equal to captain (German: Hauptmann) in the army and the air force or lieutenant (German: Kapitänleutnant) in the navy. In the Austrian and Swiss armies, the rank is Hauptmann.

This rank corresponds to NATO code OF2, and is known in English as captain (Dr.) for army or air force officers or lieutenant (Dr.) for naval officers. The rank was historically also used in the Austro-Hungarian Common Army and corresponded to major or the NATO code OF-3, known as major (Dr.) in English.

The German word Arzt is the general term for a medical practitioner in German. In English the word surgeon in a military context is applied to any medical practitioner, due to the historical evolution of the term, and does not refer exclusively to the modern specialty of surgery. Thus the title is translated as Staff Surgeon in English. The rank of Staff Surgeon has also existed in English-speaking countries; it was used in the Royal Navy of the United Kingdom until 1918.

Holders of this rank are commissioned officers; in practice their authority is often limited to medical matters and medical staff (such as other doctors, nurses and other medics working under their supervision). Under international humanitarian law (specifically the First and Second Geneva Conventions) they are regarded as neutral non-combatants and accorded the status of "protected persons" when participating in humanitarian work during armed conflicts, such as caring for the sick or wounded. They may wear the red cross as a protective sign. As such, they may not be attacked, harmed or taken as prisoners of war (attacking medical personnel is a war crime), and are entitled under the Geneva Conventions to carry out their work without being inhibited. They may be armed, usually with service pistols, strictly for defensive purposes, including self defense and the defense of patients.

Stabsarzt

Rank insignia
German medical service ranks
Introduction

Rank group
Commissioned officers
Heer/Luftwaffe
Marine
*Stabsarzt
*Stabsapotheker
*Stabsveterinär

short (in lists)
*StArzt (SA)
*StApotheker (SAP)
*StVeterinär (SV)
NATO
equivalent
OF-2

== Germany ==
=== Bundeswehr ===
In the Joint Medical Service of the German Bundeswehr Stabsarzt (en: Staff surgeon), Stabsapotheker (en: Staff pharmacist), and Stabsveterinär (en: Staff veterinary) are comparable in NATO to the OF-2 ranks Hauptmann, and Kapitänleutnant. The grades belong to the captain rank group (de: Hauptleute).

=== Address ===
The manner of formal addressing of military surgeons/dentists with the rank Stabsarzt is, "Herr/Frau Stabsarzt"; with the rank Stabsapotheker, "Herr/Frau Stabsapotheker"; with the rank Stabsveterinär, "Herr/Frau Stabsveterinär". Although the grammatically female form of Arzt is Ärztin, the military does not have separate gendered ranks, so the correct form of address for a female doctor is "Frau Stabsarzt" and not "Frau Stabsärztin".

=== Rank insignias ===
On the shoulder straps (Heer, Luftwaffe) there are three silver stars and the career insignia (de: Laufbahnabzeichen) as symbol of the medical standing, or course of studies. The piping on shoulder straps shows the Waffenfarbe (en: corps- or troop-function colour), corresponding to the appropriate military service, branch, or special force. The corps colour of the "Bundeswehr Joint Medical Service" is dark blue.

In the Marines, the career insignia is in the middle of both sleeves, 3 cm above the cuff strips, and on the shoulder straps between strips and button.

Stabsarzt i.G. Stabsarzt (hum. medicine) Stabsarzt (dent. medicine) Stabsapotheker Stabsveterinär	Stabsarzt (hum.) hum. (on Flight suit) Stabsarzt (dent.)

Human medicine Stabsarzt (hum.) Mounting loop Sleeve	Dentistry Sleeve	Pharmacy Mounting loop Sleeve

junior Rank; Leutnant SanOA; Oberleutnant SanOA	German medical officer rank Stabsarzt	senior Rank; Oberstabsarzt

=== Wehrmacht ===
Rank insignia

Collar patches

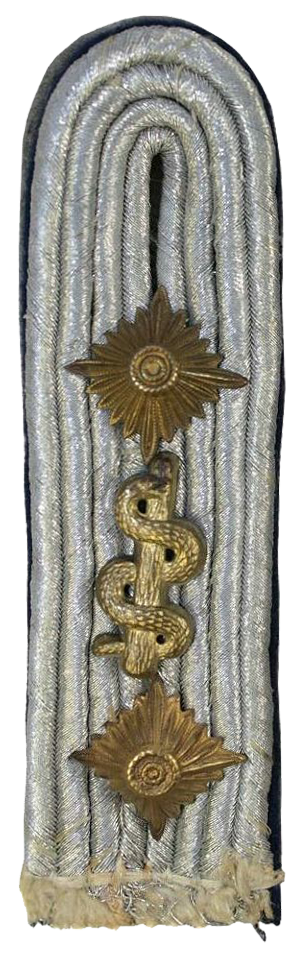
Shoulder strap with Rod of Asclepius

Stabsarzt of the German Wehrmacht was comparable to the Hauptmann / Kapitänleutnant (OF-2), as well as to the Hauptsturmführer and Hauptmann of the Waffen-SS.

During wartime, the regular assignment of a Stabsarzt was the management of a main dressing station (German: Hauptverbandsplatz), maintained by the 2nd platoon of the medical company, and supported by first lieutenants (Dr.), second lieutenants (Dr.), and help surgeons (German: Ober-, Assistenz-, and Hilfsärzte). A Stabsarzt also could serve in a variety of other roles.

In line to the so-called Reichsbesoldungsordnung (en: Reich's salary order), appendixes to the Salary law of the German Empire (de: Besoldungsgesetz des Deutschen Reiches) of 1927 (changes 1937 – 1940), the comparative ranks were as follows: C 7

- Hauptmann (Heer and Luftwaffe)
- Kapitänleutnant (Kriegsmarine)
- Stabsarzt (medical service of the Wehrmacht)
- Marinestabsarzt, introduced 26 June 1935 (medical service of the Kriegsmarine)
- Stabsveterinär (veterinarian service of the Wehrmacht)

The corps colour of the military Health Service Support (HSS) in German armed forces was traditional dark bluedark blue, and of the veterinarian service carmine red. This tradition was continued by the medical service corps in Heer and Luftwaffe of the Reichswehr and Wehrmacht. However, the corps colour of the Waffen-SS and Kriegsmarine HSS was cornflower blue.

Ranks Wehrmacht until 1945				Ranks
Medical service	en translation	Equivalent Heer	en equivalent	Ranks
Generaloberstabsarzt	Senior Staff-Surgeon General	General der Waffengattung	three star rank	OF-8
Generalstabsarzt	Staff-Surgeon General	Generalleutnant	two star rank	OF-7
Generalarzt	Surgeon General	Generalmajor	one star rank	OF-6
Oberstarzt	Colonel (Dr.)	Oberst	Colonel	OF-5
Oberfeldarzt	Lieutenant colonel (Dr.)	Oberstleutnant	Lieutenant colonel	OF-4
Oberstabsarzt	Major (Dr.)	Major		OF-3
Stabsarzt	Captain (Dr.)	Hauptmann	Captain (army)	OF-2
Oberarzt	First lieutenant (Dr.)	Oberleutnant	First lieutenant	OF-1a
Assistenzarzt	Second lieutenant (Dr.)	Leutnant	Second lieutenant	OF-1b
Unterarzt	Sergeant 1st Class (Dr.)	Fahnenjunker-Oberfeldwebel	Officer Aspirant	OR-7
Feldunterarzt (since 1940)	Sergeant 1st Class (Dr.)	Fahnenjunker-Oberfeldwebel	Officer Aspirant	OR-7

==== Kriegsmarine ====
Rank designations of the Kriegsmarine, as of 30 March 1934, are contained in the table below.

Ranks Kriegsmarine (medical service)				Ranks
Medical service	en translation	Equivalent Kriegsmarine	en equivalent	Ranks
Admiraloberstabsarzt	Surgeon general	Admiral (Germany)	three star rank	OF-8
Admiralstabsarzt	Rear admiral upper half (Dr.)	Vizeadmiral	two star rank	OF-7
Admiralarzt	Rear admiral lower half (Dr.)	Konteradmiral	one star rank	OF-6
Flottenarzt	Captain naval (Dr.)	Kapitän zur See	Captain (naval)	OF-5
Geschwaderarzt	Commander (Dr.)	Fregattenkapitän	Commander	OF-4
Marineoberstabsarzt	Lieutenant commander (Dr.)	Korvettenkapitän	Lieutenant commander	OF-3
Marinestabsarzt	Lieutenant naval (Dr.)	Kapitänleutnant	Lieutenant (naval)	OF-2
Marineoberarzt	Lieutenant junior grade (Dr.)	Oberleutnant zur See	Lieutenant (junior grade)	OF-1a
Marineassistenzarzt	Ensign (Dr.)	Leutnant zur See	Ensign	OF-1b

== Austria-Hungary ==
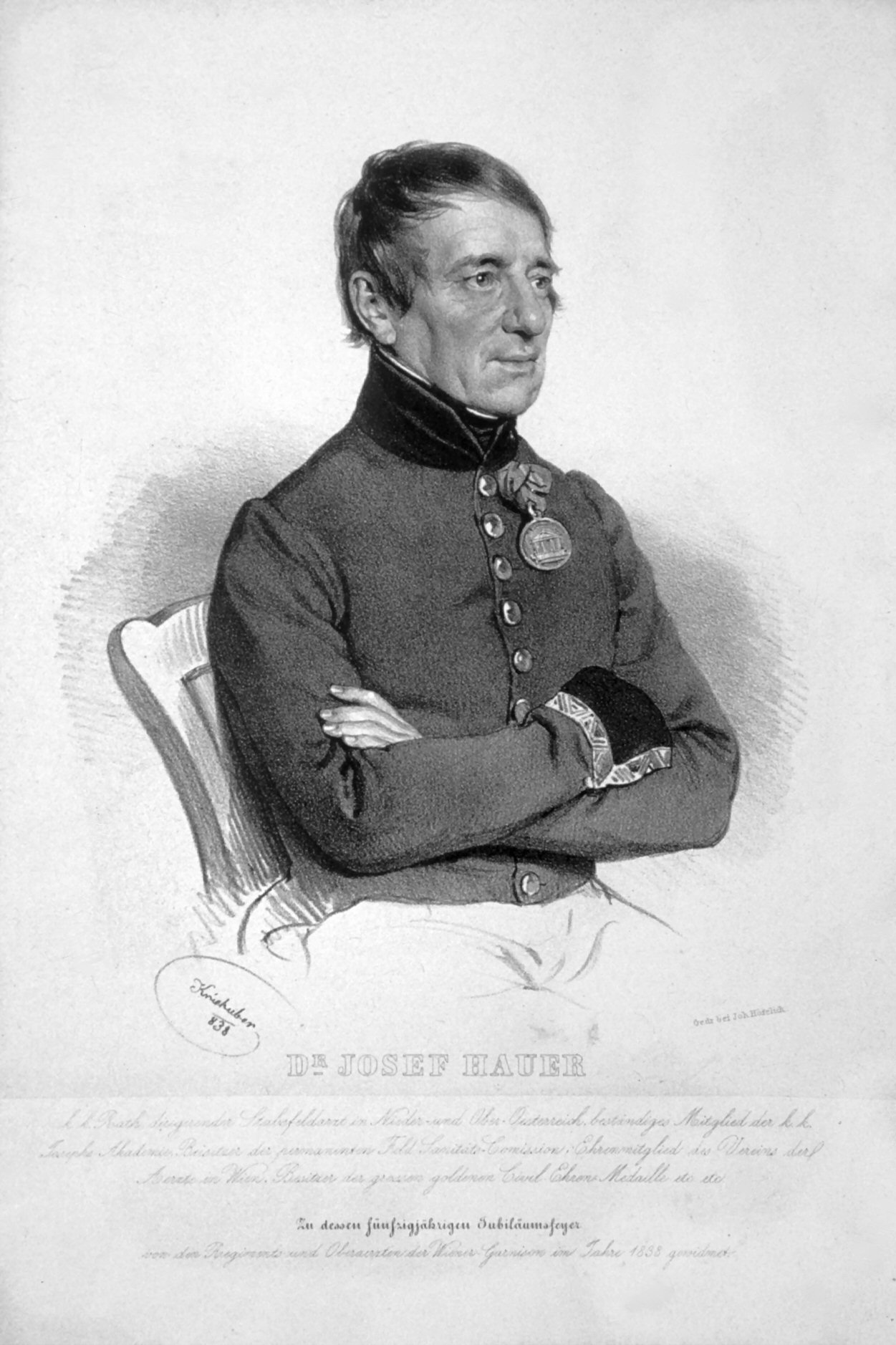
Josef Hauer (1769-1848), Stabsarzt.

In the Austro-Hungarian Common Army (de: Gemeinsame Armee or k.u.k. Armee) there were the OF2-ranks Regimentsarzt I. Klasse and Regimentsarzt II. Klasse (en: Regiment surgeon 1st class / – 2nd class) until 1918, equivalent to the OF2-rank Stabsarzt in Germany. That particular rank was comparable to the Hauptmann/Captain OF2-rank as well.

Ranks k.u.k. Army until 1918				Ranks
Medical service	en	Equivalent Heer	en	Ranks
Generalstabsarzt	Staff-Surgeon General	Generalmajor	Major general	OF-6
Oberstabsarzt I. Klasse	Colonel (Dr. 1st class)	Oberst	Colonel	OF-5
Oberstabsarzt II. Klasse	Lieutenant colonel (Dr. 2nd class)	Oberstleutnant	Lieutenant colonel	OF-4
Stabsarzt	Major (Dr.)	Major		OF-3
Regimentsarzt I. Klasse	Captain (Dr. 1st class)	Hauptmann	Captain	OF-2
Regimentsarzt II. Klasse	Captain (Dr. 2nd class)	Hauptmann	Captain	OF-2
Oberazt	First lieutenant (Dr.)	Oberleutnant	First lieutenant	OF-1
Assistenzarzt	Second lieutenant (Dr.)	Leutnant	Second lieutenant	OF-1
