= Generalstabsarzt =

German military rank

Generalstabsarzt and Admiralstabsarzt are "two-star" ranks and the second highest ranks in the medical service of the German Bundeswehr. Equivalent ranks in the Heer are Generalmajor and in the Marine Konteradmiral.

Generalstabsarzt

Rank insignia
German medical service ranks
Introduction

Rank group
Commissioned officers
Navy
AdmStArzt (ASA)
Army / Air Force
GenStArzt (GSA)
NATO
equivalent
OF-7
US Army/Air Force
Assistant Surgeon General
US Navy
Deputy Surgeon General

== Bundeswehr ==
Generalstabsarzt and Admiralstabsarzt are the second highest ranks of the Joint Medical Service of the Bundeswehr. Normally the deputy inspector of the medical service (Stellvertretender Inspekteur des Sanitätsdienstes) is assigned this rank, as is the commander of the Bundeswehr Medical Academy.

=== Address ===
Military surgeons with the rank Generalstabsarzt are addressed "Herr Generalarzt" if male, or "Frau Generalarzt" if female. Naval military surgeons with the rank Admiralstabsarzt are addressed "Herr Admiralarzt" or "Frau Admiralarzt", depending on the gender of the person addressed.

=== Rank insignias ===
Rank insignia are modified forms of the shoulder straps for major generals, two golden stars surrounded by golden oak leaves, with the addition of a rod of Asclepius. This career insignia (Laufbahnabzeichen), as symbol of medical status or course of studies, is placed above the stars. In the navy, the career insignia is placed three centimeters above the cuff stripes on both sleeves and on the shoulder straps between the stripes of the rank and the button.

Generalstabsarzt (human medicine) Generalstabsarzt (dental medicine)	General-stabsarzt	Admiralstabsarzt Admiralstabsarzt Mounting loop

Junior rank Generalarzt; Admiralarzt	German medical officer rank Generalstabsarzt; Admiralstabsarzt	Senior rank Generaloberstabsarzt; Admiraloberstabsarzt

=== History ===
Arabesque as used until 1944

==== Wehrmacht 1933 – 1945 ====
Generalstabsarzt of the Wehrmacht was comparable to the Generalleutnant, as well as to the Gruppenführer and Generalleutnant of the Waffen-SS.

In line with the Reich's salary order (Reichsbesoldungsordnung) and appendices to the salary law of the Reich (Besoldungsgesetz des Deutschen Reiches) of 1927 (with changes 1937–1940), the comparative ranks were as follows:

- Generalleutnant in the Heer and Luftwaffe
- Vizeadmiral in the Kriegsmarine
- Generalstabsarzt in the medical service of the Wehrmacht, from 1934 on
- Generalstabsveterinär in the veterinarian service of the Wehrmacht, from 1934 on

==== Comparative military ranks ====
Wehrmacht ranks				Ranks
Medical service	English translation	Equivalent Heer	English equivalent	Ranks
Generaloberstabsarzt	Senior Staff-Surgeon General	General der Waffengattung	three star rank	OF-8
Generalstabsarzt	Staff-Surgeon General	Generalleutnant	two star rank	OF-7
Generalarzt	Surgeon General	Generalmajor	one star rank	OF-6
Oberstarzt	Colonel (Dr.)	Oberst	Colonel	OF-5
Oberfeldarzt	Lieutenant colonel (Dr.)	Oberstleutnant	Lieutenant colonel	OF-4
Oberstabsarzt	Major (Dr.)	Major		OF-3
Stabsarzt	Captain (Dr.)	Hauptmann	Captain (army)	OF-2
Oberarzt	First lieutenant (Dr.)	Oberleutnant	First lieutenant	OF-1a
Assistenzarzt	Second lieutenant (Dr.)	Leutnant	Second lieutenant	OF-1b
Unterarzt	Sergeant 1st Class (Dr.)	Fahnenjunker-Oberfeldwebel	Officer Aspirant	OR-7
Feldunterarzt (since 1940)	Sergeant 1st Class (Dr.)	Fahnenjunker-Oberfeldwebel	Officer Aspirant	OR-7

===== Kriegsmarine =====
Rank designations of the Kriegsmarine as on 30 March 1934 are contained in the table below.

Kriegsmarine ranks				Ranks
Medical service	English translation	Equivalent Kriegsmarine	English equivalent	Ranks
Admiraloberstabsarzt	Surgeon general	Admiral (Germany)	three star rank	OF-8
Admiralstabsarzt	Rear admiral (upper half) (Dr.)	Vizeadmiral	two star rank	OF-7
Admiralarzt	Rear admiral (lower half) (Dr.)	Konteradmiral	one star rank	OF-6
Flottenarzt	Captain naval (Dr.)	Kapitän zur See	Captain (naval)	OF-5
Geschwaderarzt	Commander (Dr.)	Fregattenkapitän	Commander	OF-4
Marineoberstabsarzt	Lieutenant commander (Dr.)	Korvettenkapitän	Lieutenant commander	OF-3
Marinestabsarzt	Lieutenant naval (Dr.)	Kapitänleutnant	Lieutenant (naval)	OF-2
Marineoberarzt	Lieutenant junior grade (Dr.)	Oberleutnant zur See	Lieutenant (junior grade)	OF-1a
Marineassistenzarzt	Ensign (Dr.)	Leutnant zur See	Ensign	OF-1b

==== Germany before 1933 ====
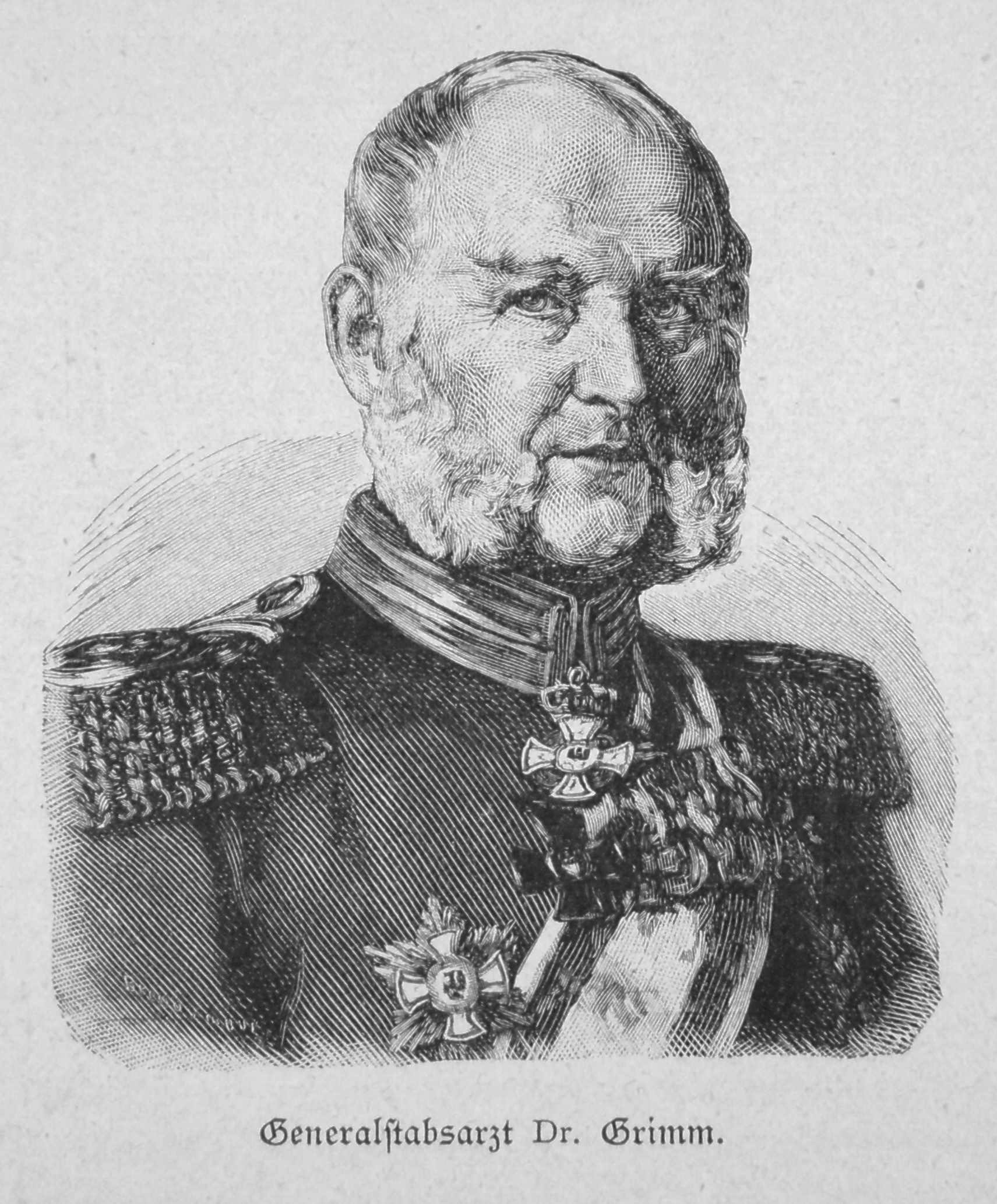
Generalstabsarzt D.M. Grimm, Major general of the Medical Corps, wood-engraving ca. 1885

In Prussia and Bavaria surgeon general of the army (Generalstabsarzt der Armee) was an appointment and the official title of the head of the entire military medical service. Officers assigned to this staff position could rise in rank up to Generalleutnant (OF-7).

Until 1856 the Generalstabsarzt of the Prussian Army could be promoted to colonel (Oberst). From then on he could rise to Generalmajor, and from 1873 to Generalleutnant. At the same time the Generalstabsarzt was chief of the medical department of the Prussian Ministry of War and chief of the medical corps. He was also superior to a Generalarzt.

Equivalent authority, mandate and competence was with the Generalstabsarzt of the Imperial German Navy. He was chief of the medical division in the German Imperial Naval Office and chief of the navy's medical corps as well.

== Austria-Hungary ==
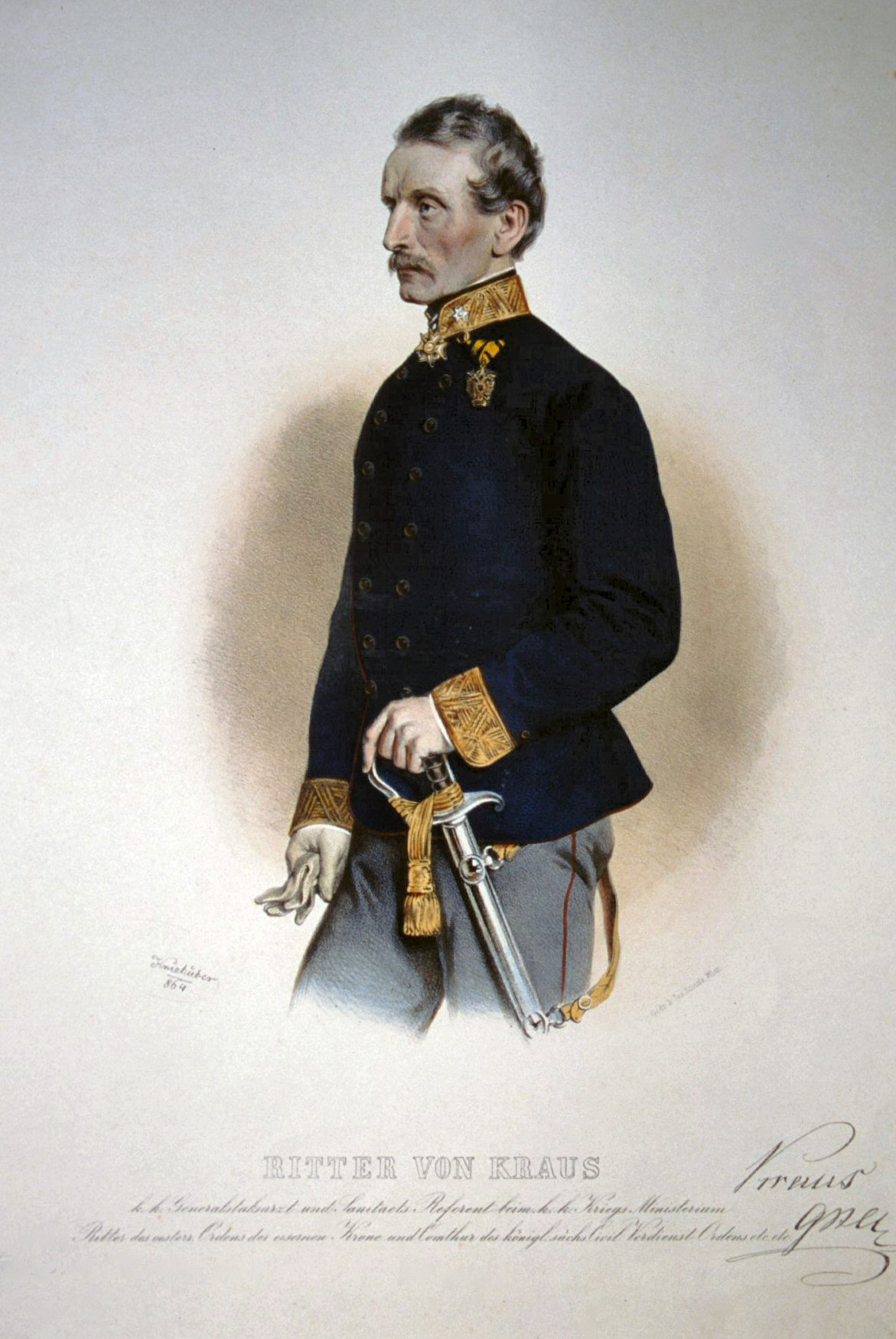
Generalstabsarzt Felix Ritter von Kraus, 1864

In the Common Army there were two regular Generalstabsarzt staff positions established. One was chief of the medical division of the Reichskriegsministerium and chief of the military surgeon officer corps. The second was Praeses of the military medical committee. This rank was comparable to the Generalmajor of the Common Army.

In some cases a surgeon general of a corps (Generalkommando) could be promoted to the rank of Generalstabsarzt.

=== Officers with that rank ===
- Johann Traugott Dreyer von der Iller (1804-1871), Generalstabsarzt
- Felix von Kraus (1805-1875), Generalstabsarzt und Sanitätsreferent

Ranks of the Common Army				Ranks
Medical service	English translation	Equivalent Heer	English translation	Ranks
Generalstabsarzt	Staff-Surgeon General	Generalmajor	Major general	OF-6
Oberstabsarzt I. Klasse	Colonel (Dr. 1st class)	Oberst	Colonel	OF-5
Oberstabsarzt II. Klasse	Lieutenant colonel (Dr. 2nd class)	Oberstleutnant	Lieutenant colonel	OF-4
Stabsarzt	Major (Dr.)	Major		OF-3
Regimentsarzt I. Klasse	Captain (Dr. 1st class)	Hauptmann	Captain	OF-2
Regimentsarzt II. Klasse	Captain (Dr. 2nd class)	Hauptmann	Captain	OF-2
Oberarzt	First lieutenant (Dr.)	Oberleutnant	First lieutenant	OF-1a
Assistenzarzt	Second lieutenant (Dr.)	Leutnant	Second lieutenant	OF-1b

== Relevant literature ==
- Neumann, Alexander: Arzttum ist immer Kämpfertum - Die Heeressanitätsinspektion und das Amt "Chef des Wehrmachtsanitätswesens" im Zweiten Weltkrieg (1939-1945), 2005. ISBN 3-7700-1618-1
- Süß, Winfried: Der "Völkskörper" im Krieg: Gesundheitspolitik, Gesundheitsverhältnisse und Krankenmord im nationalsozialistischen Deutschland 1939-1945, 2003. ISBN 3-486-56719-5
