= Oberstarzt =

Oberstarzt (OTA) is a military rank in German speaking armed forces. It denotes a medical staff officer surgeon or medical staff officer dentist and is comparable to Colonel (de: Oberst) or Captain (naval) (de: Kapitän zur See) NATO-Rangcode OF5 in anglophone armed forces.

Oberstarzt (Joint Medical Service)

Rank insignia
German medical service ranks
Introduction

Rank group
Commissioned officers
Army / Air Force
Oberstarzt (equivalent Oberst)
Navy
Flottenarzt (equivalent KzS)
NATO
equivalent
OF-5

== Germany ==
=== Bundeswehr ===
In the Joint Medical Service of the German Bundeswehr Oberstarzt, Oberstapotheker, and Oberstveterinär are comparable in NATO to the OF-5 rank Oberst; Flottenarzt, and Flottenapotheker are equivalent to Kapitän zur See, OF-5 as well.

==== Address ====
The manner of formal addressing of military surgeons/dentists with the rank Oberstarzt is "Herr/Frau Oberstarzt"; with the rank Oberstapotheker, "Herr/Frau Oberstapotheker". Military surgeons/dentists with the rank Flottenarzt are addressed "Herr/Frau Flottenarzt"; with the rank Flottenapotheker, "Herr/Frau Flottenapotheker".

The "Inspector of veterinary medicine of the Bundeswehr" (de: Inspizient Veterinärmedizin der Bundeswehr) holds the rank Oberstveterinär.

==== Rank insignias ====
On the shoulder straps (Heer, Luftwaffe) there are three silver stars in silver oak leaves and the career insignia (de: Laufbahnabzeichen) as symbol of the medical standing, or course of studies. The piping on shoulder straps shows the Waffenfarbe (en: corps- or troop-function colour), corresponding to the appropriate military service, branch, or special force. The corps colour of the Bundeswehr Joint Medical Service is dark blue.

In the Marines, the career insignia is in the middle of both sleeves, 3 cm above the cuff strips, and on the shoulder straps between strips and button.

Oberstarzt i.G. hum. (field uniform) Oberstarzt (dent. medicine) Oberstapotheker Oberstveterinär	OTA i.G. (hum.) hum. (dress uniform) hum. (field uniform) Oberstapotheker pharm. (field uniform)

Human medicine Flottenarzt Mounting loop Sleeve	Dentistry Flottenarzt Mounting loop Sleeve	Pharmacy Flottenapotheker... R Sleeve Mounting loop

junior Rank; Oberfeldarzt; Flottillenarzt	German medical officer rank Oberstarzt; Flottenarzt	senior Rank; Generalarzt; Admiralarzt

=== Wehrmacht ===
Oberstarzt of the German Wehrmacht was comparable to the Oberst (OF-5), as well as to the Standartenführer and Oberst of the Waffen-SS. In line to the so-called Reichsbesoldungsordnung (en: Reich's salary order), appendixes to the Salary law of the German Empire (de: Besoldungsgesetz des Deutschen Reiches) of 1927 (changes 1937 – 1940), the comparative ranks were as follows: C 4

- Oberst (Heer and Luftwaffe)
- Kapitän zur See (Kriegsmarine)
- Oberstarzt from 1934 (medical service of the Wehrmacht)
- Flottenarzt, introduced June 26, 1935 (medical service of the Kriegsmarine)
- Oberstveterinär from 1934 (veterinarian service of the Wehrmacht)

During wartime, regular assignments of Oberstarzt was Division surgeon – IVb (de: Divisionsarzt – IVb).

The corps colour of the military Health Service Support (HSS) in German armed forces was traditional dark bluedark blue, and of the veterinarian service carmine red. This tradition was continued by the medical service corps in Heer and Luftwaffe of the Reichswehr and Wehrmacht. However, the corps colour of the Waffen-SS and Kriegsmarine HSS was cornflower blue.

Rank insignias

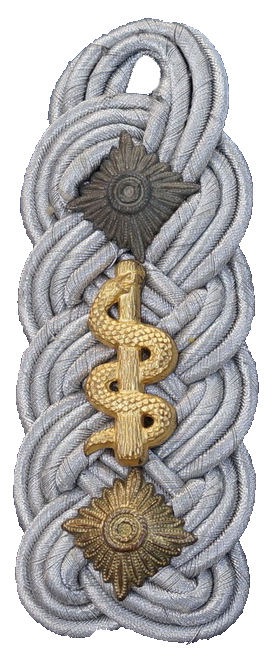
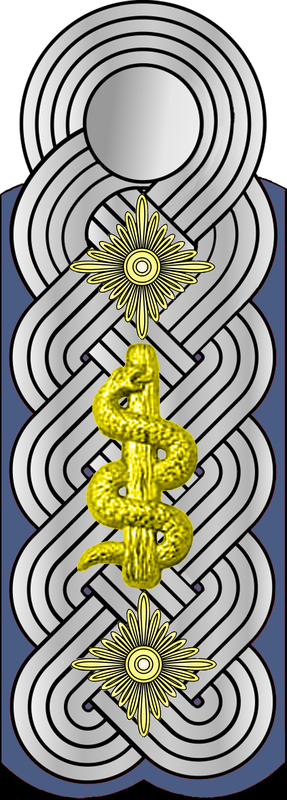
description	Heer Heer		Luftwaffe Luftwaffe		Kriegsmarine Kriegsmarine		Waffen-SS Waffen-SS
rank insignia				N/A	N/A
corps colour	dark blue		dark blue		cornflower blue		cornflower blue
	gorget patch	shoulder strap	gorget patch (im Generalstab)	shoulder strap	shoulder strap	sleeve insigia	gorget patches	shoulder strap
rank	Oberstarzt		Oberstarzt		Flottenarzt		Standartenführer (Oberstarzt Waffen-SS)

== Address ==
The manner of formal addressing of military surgeons/dentists with the rank Oberstarzt was, "Herr Oberstarzt"; with the rank Flottenarzt - "Herr Flottenarzt".

Ranks Wehrmacht until 1945				Ranks
Medical service	en translation	Equivalent Heer	en equivalent	Ranks
Generaloberstabsarzt	Senior Staff-Surgeon General	General der Waffengattung	three star rank	OF-8
Generalstabsarzt	Staff-Surgeon General	Generalleutnant	two star rank	OF-7
Generalarzt	Surgeon General	Generalmajor	one star rank	OF-6
Oberstarzt	Colonel (Dr.)	Oberst	Colonel	OF-5
Oberfeldarzt	Lieutenant colonel (Dr.)	Oberstleutnant	Lieutenant colonel	OF-4
Oberstabsarzt	Major (Dr.)	Major		OF-3
Stabsarzt	Captain (Dr.)	Hauptmann	Captain (army)	OF-2
Oberarzt	First lieutenant (Dr.)	Oberleutnant	First lieutenant	OF-1a
Assistenzarzt	Second lieutenant (Dr.)	Leutnant	Second lieutenant	OF-1b
Unterarzt	Sergeant 1st Class (Dr.)	Fahnenjunker-Oberfeldwebel	Officer Aspirant	OR-7
Feldunterarzt (since 1940)	Sergeant 1st Class (Dr.)	Fahnenjunker-Oberfeldwebel	Officer Aspirant	OR-7

Ranks Kriegsmarine (medical service)				Ranks
Medical service	en translation	Equivalent Kriegsmarine	en equivalent	Ranks
Admiraloberstabsarzt	Surgeon general	Admiral (Germany)	three star rank	OF-8
Admiralstabsarzt	Rear admiral upper half (Dr.)	Vizeadmiral	two star rank	OF-7
Admiralarzt	Rear admiral lower half (Dr.)	Konteradmiral	one star rank	OF-6
Flottenarzt	Captain naval (Dr.)	Kapitän zur See	Captain (naval)	OF-5
Geschwaderarzt	Commander (Dr.)	Fregattenkapitän	Commander	OF-4
Marineoberstabsarzt	Lieutenant commander (Dr.)	Korvettenkapitän	Lieutenant commander	OF-3
Marinestabsarzt	Lieutenant naval (Dr.)	Kapitänleutnant	Lieutenant (naval)	OF-2
Marineoberarzt	Lieutenant junior grade (Dr.)	Oberleutnant zur See	Lieutenant (junior grade)	OF-1a
Marineassistenzarzt	Ensign (Dr.)	Leutnant zur See	Ensign	OF-1b

== Austria-Hungary ==
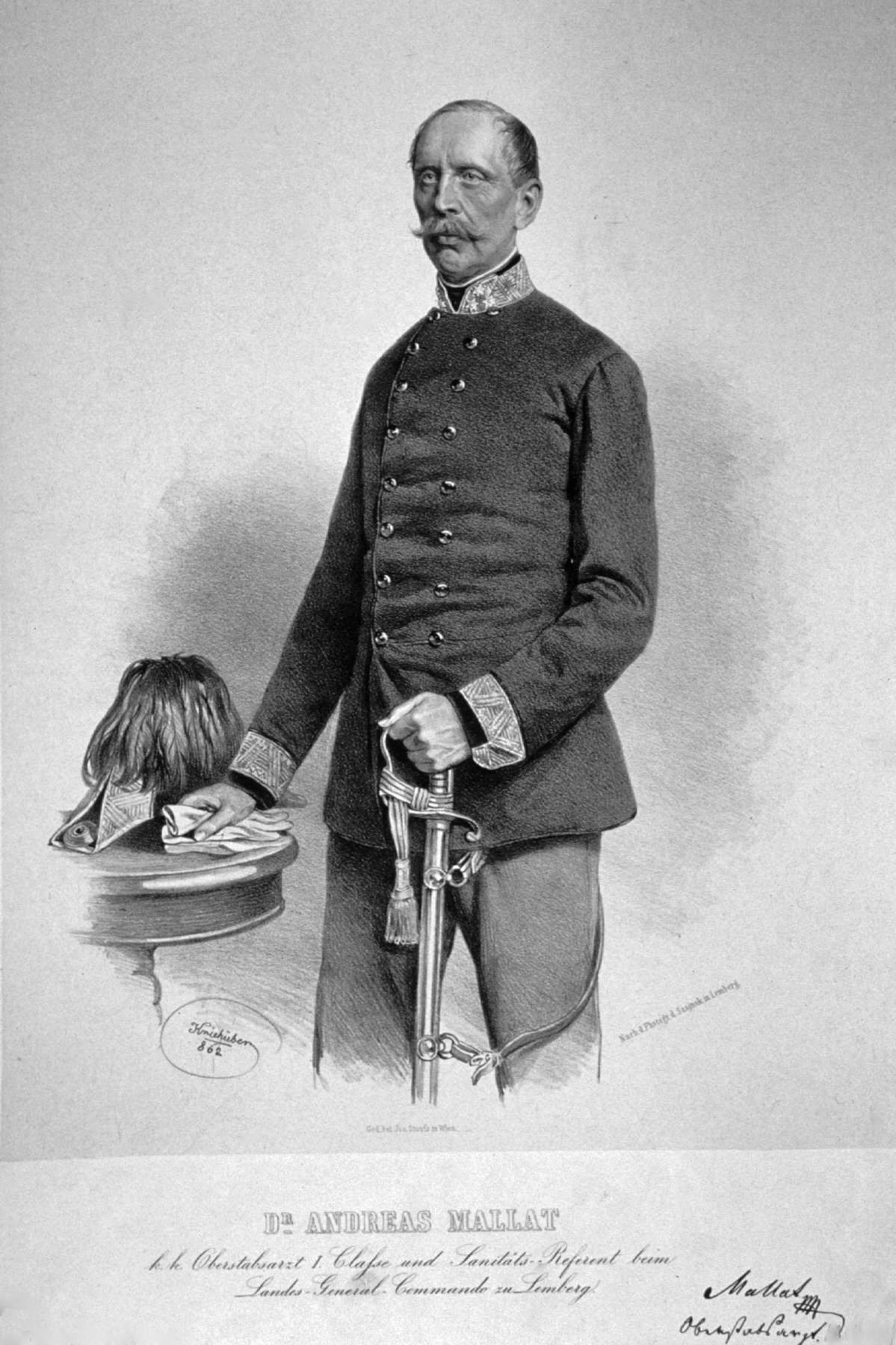
D.M. Andreas Mollat Roth, here as k. k. Oberstabsarzt, about 1863

In the Imperial & Royal Common Army of Austria-Hungary (de: Gemeinsame Armee or k.u.k. Armee) there was the rank Oberstabsarzt 1. Klasse (en: Senior staff surgeon 1st class) until 1918, equivalent to Oberstarzt in Germany. That particular rank was comparable to the Oberst OF5-rank (en: colonel) as well. There was also a rank Oberstabsarzt 2. Klasse (or másodosztályú fõtörzsorvos in Hungarian).

=== Officers with that rank ===
- Andreas Mollat (1802–1891) k. k. Oberststabsarzt

Ranks k.u.k. Army until 1918				Ranks
Medical service	en	Equivalent Heer	en	Ranks
Generalstabsarzt	Staff-Surgeon General	Generalmajor	Major general	OF-6
Oberstabsarzt I. Klasse	Colonel (Dr. 1st class)	Oberst	Colonel	OF-5
Oberstabsarzt II. Klasse	Lieutenant colonel (Dr. 2nd class)	Oberstleutnant	Lieutenant colonel	OF-4
Stabsarzt	Major (Dr.)	Major		OF-3
Regimentsarzt I. Klasse	Captain (Dr. 1st class)	Hauptmann	Captain	OF-2
Regimentsarzt II. Klasse	Captain (Dr. 2nd class)	Hauptmann	Captain	OF-2
Oberarzt	First lieutenant (Dr.)	Oberleutnant	First lieutenant	OF-1a
Assistenzarzt	Second lieutenant (Dr.)	Leutnant	Second lieutenant	OF-1b
