= Oberstabsarzt =

Oberstabsarzt (short: OStArzt or OSA) is a military rank in German speaking armed force. It describes a medical staff officer surgeon or medical staff officer dentist comparable to major (de: Major) or lieutenant commander (de: Korvettenkapitän) NATO-Rangcode OF3 in anglophone armed forces.

Oberstabsarzt

Rank insignia
German medical service ranks
Introduction

Rank group
Commissioned officers
Heer / Luftwaffe
*Oberstabsarzt
*Oberstabsapotheker
*Oberstabsveterinär

Marine
*Oberstabsarzt
*Oberstabsapotheker
*Oberstabsveterinär
short (in lists)
*OStArzt (OSA)
*OStApotheker (OSAP)
*OStVeterinär (OSV)
NATO
equivalent
OF-3

== Germany ==
=== Bundeswehr ===
In the Joint Medical Service of the German Bundeswehr Oberstabsarzt, Oberstabsapotheker, and Oberstabsveterinär comparable in NATO to the OF-3 ranks Major, and to Korvettenkapitän.

==== Address ====
The manner of formal addressing of military surgeons/dentists with the rank Oberstabsarzt is "Herr/Frau Oberstabsarzt", with the rank Oberstabsapotheker, "Herr/Frau Oberstabsapotheker", and veterinaries with the rank Oberstabsveterinär "Herr/Frau Oberstabsveterinär". Although the grammatically female form of Arzt is Ärztin, the military does not have separate gendered ranks, so the correct form of address for a female physician is "Frau Oberstabsarzt".

==== Rank insignias ====
On the shoulder straps (Heer, Luftwaffe) there is one silver star in silver oak leaves and the career insignia (de: Laufbahnabzeichen) as symbol of the medical standing, or course of studies. The piping on shoulder straps shows the Waffenfarbe (en: corps- or troop-function colour), corresponding to the appropriate military service, branch, or special force. The corps colour of the "Bundeswehr Joint Medical Service" is dark blue.

In the Marines, the career insignia is in the middle of both sleeves, 3 cm above the cuff strips, and on the shoulder straps between strips and button.

Oberstabsarzt i.G. Oberstabsarzt (hum. medicine) Oberstabsarzt (dent. medicine) Oberstabsapotheker Oberstabsveterinär	Oberstabsarzt (hum.)... Mounting loop Oberstabsarzt (dent.)... Mounting loop

Human medicine Oberstabsarzt (hum.) Mounting loop Sleeve	Dentistry Oberstabsarzt (dent.) Mounting loop Sleeve	Pharmacy Oberstabsapotheker Mounting loop Sleeve

junior Rank; Stabsarzt	German medical officer rank Oberstabsarzt	senior Rank; Oberfeldarzt; Flottillenarzt

=== Wehrmacht ===
Rank insignia

Collar patches

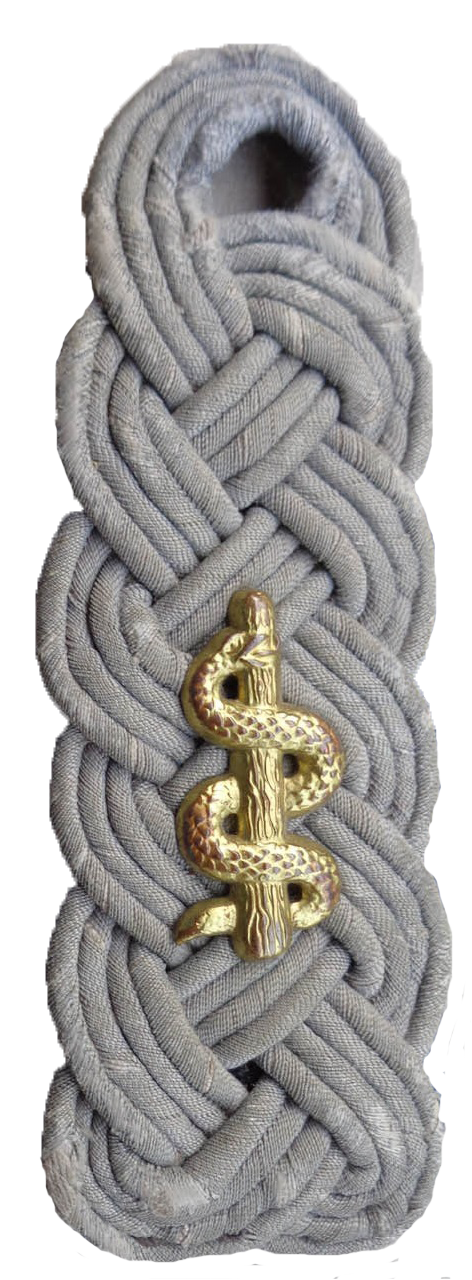
Shoulder strap with Rod of Asclepius

Oberstabsarzt of the German Wehrmacht was comparable to the Major / Korvettenkapitän (OF-3), as well as to the Sturmbannführer and Major of the Waffen-SS.

In line to the so-called Reichsbesoldungsordnung (en: Reich's salary order), appendixes to the Salary law of the German Empire (de: Besoldungsgesetz des Deutschen Reiches) of 1927 (changes 1937 – 1940), the comparative ranks were as follows: C 6

- Major (Heer and Luftwaffe)
- Korvettenkapitän (Kriegsmarine)
- Oberstabsarzt (medical service of the Wehrmacht)
- Marineoberstabsarzt, introduced June 26, 1935 (medical service of the Kriegsmarine)
- Oberstabsveterinär (veterinarian service of the Wehrmacht)

During wartime, regular assignments of Oberstabsarzt were commander of a medical company, or chief of a, field-, evacuation-, or war hospital (de. Feldlazarett / Kreislazarett). However, a field hospital could be managed by an Oberfeldarzt (OF4) as well. An Oberstabsarzt was assisted by first lieutenants (Dr.), second lieutenants (Dr.), and help surgeons (de: Ober-, Assistenz-, and Hilfsärzte).

The corps colour of the military Health Service Support (HSS) in German armed forces was traditional dark bluedark blue, and of the veterinarian service carmine red. This tradition was continued by the medical service corps in Heer and Luftwaffe of the Reichswehr and Wehrmacht. However, the corps colour of the Waffen-SS and Kriegsmarine HSS was cornflower blue.

Ranks Wehrmacht until 1945				Ranks
Medical service	en translation	Equivalent Heer	en equivalent	Ranks
Generaloberstabsarzt	Senior Staff-Surgeon General	General der Waffengattung	three star rank	OF-8
Generalstabsarzt	Staff-Surgeon General	Generalleutnant	two star rank	OF-7
Generalarzt	Surgeon General	Generalmajor	one star rank	OF-6
Oberstarzt	Colonel (Dr.)	Oberst	Colonel	OF-5
Oberfeldarzt	Lieutenant colonel (Dr.)	Oberstleutnant	Lieutenant colonel	OF-4
Oberstabsarzt	Major (Dr.)	Major		OF-3
Stabsarzt	Captain (Dr.)	Hauptmann	Captain (army)	OF-2
Oberarzt	First lieutenant (Dr.)	Oberleutnant	First lieutenant	OF-1a
Assistenzarzt	Second lieutenant (Dr.)	Leutnant	Second lieutenant	OF-1b
Unterarzt	Sergeant 1st Class (Dr.)	Fahnenjunker-Oberfeldwebel	Officer Aspirant	OR-7
Feldunterarzt (since 1940)	Sergeant 1st Class (Dr.)	Fahnenjunker-Oberfeldwebel	Officer Aspirant	OR-7

==== Kriegsmarine ====
Rank designations of the Kriegsmarine as to Match 30, 1934, are contained in the table below.

Ranks Kriegsmarine (medical service)				Ranks
Medical service	en translation	Equivalent Kriegsmarine	en equivalent	Ranks
Admiraloberstabsarzt	Surgeon general	Admiral (Germany)	three star rank	OF-8
Admiralstabsarzt	Rear admiral upper half (Dr.)	Vizeadmiral	two star rank	OF-7
Admiralarzt	Rear admiral lower half (Dr.)	Konteradmiral	one star rank	OF-6
Flottenarzt	Captain naval (Dr.)	Kapitän zur See	Captain (naval)	OF-5
Geschwaderarzt	Commander (Dr.)	Fregattenkapitän	Commander	OF-4
Marineoberstabsarzt	Lieutenant commander (Dr.)	Korvettenkapitän	Lieutenant commander	OF-3
Marinestabsarzt	Lieutenant naval (Dr.)	Kapitänleutnant	Lieutenant (naval)	OF-2
Marineoberarzt	Lieutenant junior grade (Dr.)	Oberleutnant zur See	Lieutenant (junior grade)	OF-1a
Marineassistenzarzt	Ensign (Dr.)	Leutnant zur See	Ensign	OF-1b

== Austria-Hungary ==
In the Austria-Hungarian Common Army (de: Gemeinsame Armee or k.u.k. Armee) there was the OF3-rank Stabsarzt (en: Staff surgeon) until 1918, equivalent to the OF3-rank Oberstabsarzt in Germany. That particular rank was comparable to the Major OF3-rank as well.

Ranks k.u.k. Army until 1918				Ranks
Medical service	en	Equivalent Heer	en	Ranks
Generalstabsarzt	Staff-Surgeon General	Generalmajor	Major general	OF-6
Oberstabsarzt I. Klasse	Colonel (Dr. 1st class)	Oberst	Colonel	OF-5
Oberstabsarzt II. Klasse	Lieutenant colonel (Dr. 2nd class)	Oberstleutnant	Lieutenant colonel	OF-4
Stabsarzt	Major (Dr.)	Major		OF-3
Regimentsarzt I. Klasse	Captain (Dr. 1st class)	Hauptmann	Captain	OF-2
Regimentsarzt II. Klasse	Captain (Dr. 2nd class)	Hauptmann	Captain	OF-2
Oberarzt	First lieutenant (Dr.)	Oberleutnant	First lieutenant	OF-1
Assistenzarzt	Second lieutenant (Dr.)	Leutnant	Second lieutenant	OF-1
