= Generalarzt =

Generalarzt (short: GenArzt or GA) is the designation of a military rank as well as the official title in German speaking armed forces. It is equivalent to the Admiralarzt / Generalapotheker and Brigadegeneral / Flottillenadmiral.

Generalarzt

Rank insignia
German medical service ranks
Introduction
1956
Rank group
Commissioned officers
Army / Air Force
*Generalarzt
*Generalapotheker
Navy
* Admiralarzt
* Admiralapotheker
Abbreviation
* GenArzt (GA)
* GenAp (GAP)
* AdmArzt (AA)
* AdmAp (AAP)
NATO
equivalent
OF-6

== Bundeswehr ==
Generalarzt, Admiralarzt and Generalapotheker are the lowest general ranks of the Joint Medical Service or the military medical area of the Bundeswehr.

Promoted to that senior rank might be assignments or appointments as follows:

- Chief surgeon of the Federal Armed Forces Hospital Berlin, – Hamburg, – Koblenz, and – Ulm
- Inspector dental medicine of the Bundeswehr (de: Inspizient Zahnmedizin der Bundeswehr)
- Inspector military pharmaceutics of the Bundeswehr – Generalapotheker (de: Inspizient Wehrpharmazie der Bundeswehr)
- Surgeon General of the Heer (de: Generalarzt des Heeres)
- Surgeon General of the Luftwaffe (de: Generalarzt der Luftwaffe)
- Surgeon Admiral of the Marine (de: Admiralarzt des Heeres)

Equivalent to this one-star rank (NATO-Rangcode OF-6) are Brigadegeneral (en: Brigadier general) of the Heer or Luftwaffe, and the Flottillenadmiral (en: Flotilla admiral) of the Marine.

=== Address ===
The manner of formal addressing of military surgeons with the rank Generalarzt (OF6, one-star), Generalstabsarzt (OF7, two stars) or Generaloberstabsarzt is, „Herr/Frau Generalarzt“. At the other hand, military surgeons with the rank Admiralarzt (OF6, one-star), Admiralstabsarzt (OF7, two stars) or Admiraloberstabsarzt is, „Herr/Frau Admiralarzt“. Military persons with the rank Generalapotheker (OF6, one-star), will be addressed „Herr/Frau Generalapotheker“.

=== Rank insignias ===
On the shoulder straps (Heer, Luftwaffe) there is one golden star in golden oak leaves and the career insignia (de: Laufbahnabzeichen) as symbol of the medical standing, or course of studies. Regarding the Marine, the career insignia is in the middle of both sleeves, tree cm above the cuff strips, and on the shoulder straps between strips and button.

Heer	Luftwaffe	Marine
Generalarzt (human medicine)... Field uniform Generalarzt (dental medicine)... field uniform... field uniform	Generalarzt (hum.) Generalarzt (dent.)	Admiralarzt (hum.) Admiralarzt (dent.) Admiralapotheker (pharm.)

Sequence of ranks ascenting

junior rank: Oberstarzt; Flottenarzt	German medical officer rank Generalarzt; Admiralarzt	senior rank: Generalstabsarzt; Admiralstabsarzt

== Wehrmacht 1933 – 1945 ==
Arabesque (until 1944)

Generalarzt of the Wehrmacht was comparable to the Generalmajor (OF-6, one star), as well as to the Brigadeführer and Generalmajor of the Waffen-SS.

In line to the so-called Reichsbesoldungsordnung (en: Reich's salary order), appendixes to the Salary law of the German Empire (de: Besoldungsgesetz des Deutschen Reiches) of 1927 (changes 1937 – 1940), the comparative ranks were as follows: C 3

- Generalmajor (Heer and Luftwaffe)
- Konteradmiral (Kriegsmarine)
- Generalarzt from 1934 (medical service of the Wehrmacht)
- Admiralarzt, introduced 26 June 1935 (medical service of the Kriegsmarine)
- Generalveterinär from 1934 (veterinarian service of the Wehrmacht)

=== Comparative military ranks ===
Ranks Wehrmacht until 1945				Ranks
Medical service	en translation	Equivalent Heer	en equivalent	Ranks
Generaloberstabsarzt	Senior Staff-Surgeon General	General der Waffengattung	three star rank	OF-8
Generalstabsarzt	Staff-Surgeon General	Generalleutnant	two star rank	OF-7
Generalarzt	Surgeon General	Generalmajor	one star rank	OF-6
Oberstarzt	Colonel (Dr.)	Oberst	Colonel	OF-5
Oberfeldarzt	Lieutenant colonel (Dr.)	Oberstleutnant	Lieutenant colonel	OF-4
Oberstabsarzt	Major (Dr.)	Major		OF-3
Stabsarzt	Captain (Dr.)	Hauptmann	Captain (army)	OF-2
Oberarzt	First lieutenant (Dr.)	Oberleutnant	First lieutenant	OF-1a
Assistenzarzt	Second lieutenant (Dr.)	Leutnant	Second lieutenant	OF-1b
Unterarzt	Sergeant 1st Class (Dr.)	Fahnenjunker-Oberfeldwebel	Officer Aspirant	OR-7
Feldunterarzt (since 1940)	Sergeant 1st Class (Dr.)	Fahnenjunker-Oberfeldwebel	Officer Aspirant	OR-7

==== Kriegsmarine ====
Rank designations of the Kriegsmarine as of 30 Match 1934 are contained in the table below.

Ranks Kriegsmarine (medical service)				Ranks
Medical service	en translation	Equivalent Kriegsmarine	en equivalent	Ranks
Admiraloberstabsarzt	Surgeon general	Admiral (Germany)	three star rank	OF-8
Admiralstabsarzt	Rear admiral upper half (Dr.)	Vizeadmiral	two star rank	OF-7
Admiralarzt	Rear admiral lower half (Dr.)	Konteradmiral	one star rank	OF-6
Flottenarzt	Captain naval (Dr.)	Kapitän zur See	Captain (naval)	OF-5
Geschwaderarzt	Commander (Dr.)	Fregattenkapitän	Commander	OF-4
Marineoberstabsarzt	Lieutenant commander (Dr.)	Korvettenkapitän	Lieutenant commander	OF-3
Marinestabsarzt	Lieutenant naval (Dr.)	Kapitänleutnant	Lieutenant (naval)	OF-2
Marineoberarzt	Lieutenant junior grade (Dr.)	Oberleutnant zur See	Lieutenant (junior grade)	OF-1a
Marineassistenzarzt	Ensign (Dr.)	Leutnant zur See	Ensign	OF-1b

== Germany before 1933 ==
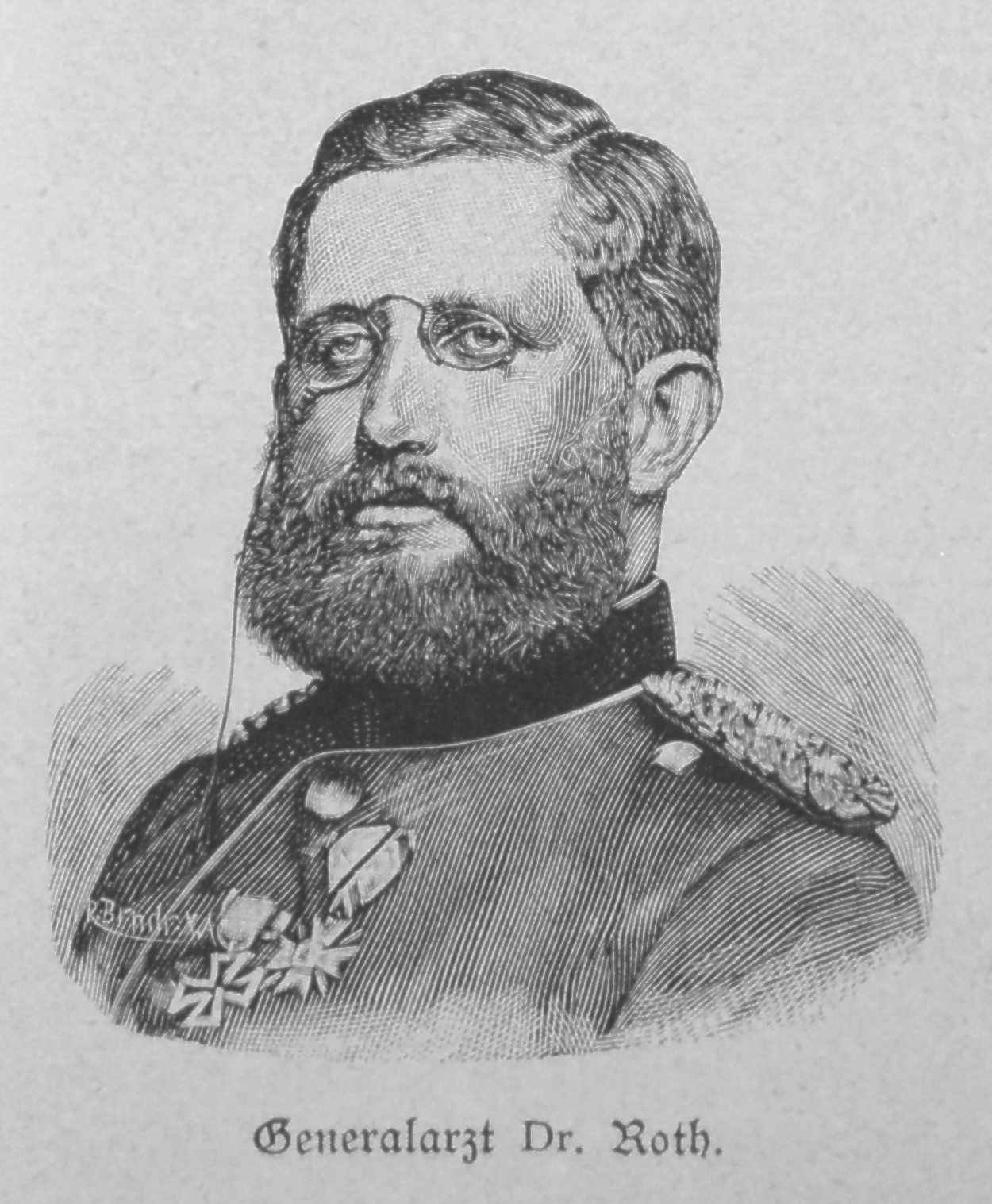
Generalarzt Dr. med. Wilhelm August Roth, here as Generalmajor of the Medical Corps, ca. 1885.

In Germany before 1933 Generalstabsarzt was normally the chief of the medical service of an Army corps (Corps surgeon, de: Korpsarzt), and in some cases of a Division (Division surgeon, de: Divisionsarzt).

In Prussian Army Generalarzt, in sense of general surgeon as a staff position, was a senior military official (de: oberer Militärbeamter) with a definite rank, in the first instance Major (OF3). Since 1856 he could rise to Oberstleutnant (OF4) or even to Oberst (OF5). Senior Generalstabsärzte were often promoted to Generalmajor.

Equivalent authority, mandate and competence were with the Admiralarzt of the Imperial German Navy. Regular assignments to that staff position were the Medical Offices on Baltic Sea and North Sea, e.g. Kiel and Wilhelmshaven. An Admiralarzt of the Navy's Medical corps could normally be promoted up to the OF5-rank Kapitän zur See.

== Officers with that rank ==
- Walther Asal (1891–1987)
- Erwin Angermeyer (1888–1963)
- Karl Arndt (1909–1943)
- Rudolf Attig (1893–1981), Generalarzt (1 July 1944)
- Hermann Bach (1870–1941)
- Ernst Baader (1894–1953)
- Paul Baethke (1895–1953)
- Hans-Joachim Barnewitz (1892–1965)
- Wilhelm Baumeister (1887–1963)
- Alfred Bayer (1888–1952)
- Paul Baethke (1895–1953)
- Hermann Bach (1870–1941)
- Ernst Becker (1884–1962)
- Rudolf von Burk (1841–1924)
- Walter Groth (1883–1947)
- Stanislaus von Mielecki (1851–1938)(O.Pusch), Königl. Preußischer Generalarzt, Balley Brandenburg Ehrenritter 1917 und Rechtritter 1926 des Johanniter Ordens
- Dirk Raphael (born 1953)
- Ferdinand Sauerbruch (1875–1951), Generalarzt des Heeres 1942
- Verena von Weymarn (born 1943), Generalarzt der Luftwaffe
- Eugen Wullen (1892–1967)
- Arno Roßlau (born 1948)
- Thomas Harbaum
