= Oberarzt =

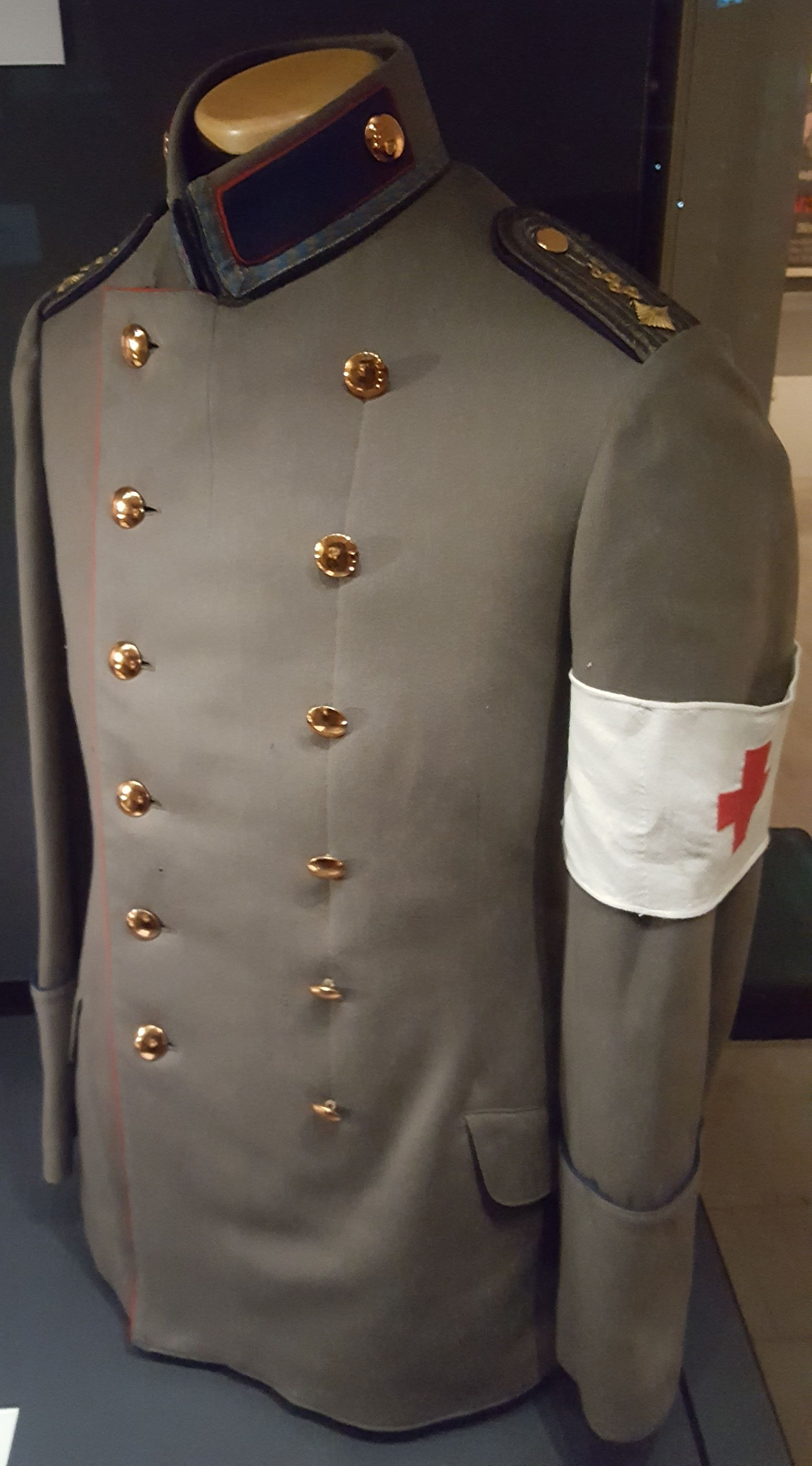
Uniform of an Oberarzt of the Bavarian Army, 1916 (Bayerisches Armeemuseum)

Oberarzt (short: OArzt or OA), literally meaning "senior physician," in English known as first lieutenant (Dr.), was a military commissioned officer rank in the Austro-Hungarian Common Army until 1918, and in the German Reichswehr and Wehrmacht until 1945.

It describes a qualified or licensed surgeon or dentist with a rank equal to 1st lieutenant (de: Oberleutnant) or sub-lieutenant lieutenant (de: Oberleutant zur See) NATO-Rangcode OF1a in anglophone armed forces.

While holders of this rank were commissioned officers, their authority was usually limited to medical matters and medical staff, and they were regarded as non-combatants and accorded the status of "protected persons" under international humanitarian law when participating in humanitarian work during armed conflicts. As such, they could not be attacked, harmed or taken as prisoners of war, and were entitled under the Geneva Conventions to carry out their work without being inhibited.

During the German airborne invasion of Crete, 20 May 1941, one military medical doctor (Oberarzt Doctor Neumann) took command of the first battalion of the Parachute Storm Regiment when all other officers were killed or wounded. He commanded the battalion during the first assault on Hill 107.

== Germany ==
Collar patches

=== Wehrmacht ===
In the German Wehrmacht from 1933 until 1945 there were the OF1a-ranks Oberarzt (physician), Oberapotheker (pharacologis), and Oberveterinär (veterinary), comparable to the Oberleutnant/First lieutenant OF2a-rank.

During wartime, the regular assignment of Oberarzt was the management of a battalion dressing station (de. Truppenverbandsplatz), supported by second lieutenants (Dr.), and help surgeons (de: Assistenz-, and Hilfsärzte). However, a battalion dressing station could be managed by an Assistenzarzt (OF1b) as well.

In line to the so-called Reichsbesoldungsordnung (en: Reich's salary order), appendixes to the Salary law of the German Empire (de: Besoldungsgesetz des Deutschen Reiches) of 1927 (changes 1937 – 1940), the comparative ranks were as follows: C 8/C 9

- Oberleutnant, Leutnant (Heer and Luftwaffe)
  - Leutnant
- Oberleutnant zur See (Kriegsmarine)
  - Leutnant zur See
- Oberarzt (medical service of the Wehrmacht)
  - Assistenzarzt
- Marineoberassistenzarzt, introduced on 26 June 1935 (medical service of the Kriegsmarine)
  - Marineassistenzarzt
- Oberveterinär (veterinarian service of the Wehrmacht)
  - Veterinär

The corps colour of the military Health Service Support (HSS) in German armed forces was traditional dark bluedark blue, and of the veterinarian service carmine red. This tradition was continued by the medical service corps in Heer and Luftwaffe of the Reichswehr and Wehrmacht. However, the corps colour of the Waffen-SS and Kriegsmarine HSS was cornflower blue.

junior Rank; Assistenzarzt	German medical officer rank Oberarzt	senior Rank; Stabsarzt

=== Address ===
The manner of formal addressing of military surgeons/dentists with the rank Oberarzt was, "Herr Oberarzt"; with the rank Marineoberarzt - "Herr Marineoberarzt".

Ranks Wehrmacht until 1945				Ranks
Medical service	en translation	Equivalent Heer	en equivalent	Ranks
Generaloberstabsarzt	Senior Staff-Surgeon General	General der Waffengattung	three star rank	OF-8
Generalstabsarzt	Staff-Surgeon General	Generalleutnant	two star rank	OF-7
Generalarzt	Surgeon General	Generalmajor	one star rank	OF-6
Oberstarzt	Colonel (Dr.)	Oberst	Colonel	OF-5
Oberfeldarzt	Lieutenant colonel (Dr.)	Oberstleutnant	Lieutenant colonel	OF-4
Oberstabsarzt	Major (Dr.)	Major		OF-3
Stabsarzt	Captain (Dr.)	Hauptmann	Captain (army)	OF-2
Oberarzt	First lieutenant (Dr.)	Oberleutnant	First lieutenant	OF-1a
Assistenzarzt	Second lieutenant (Dr.)	Leutnant	Second lieutenant	OF-1b
Unterarzt	Sergeant 1st Class (Dr.)	Fahnenjunker-Oberfeldwebel	Officer Aspirant	OR-7
Feldunterarzt (from 1940)	Sergeant 1st Class (Dr.)	Fahnenjunker-Oberfeldwebel	Officer Aspirant	OR-7

Ranks Kriegsmarine (medical service)				Ranks
Medical service	en translation	Equivalent Kriegsmarine	en equivalent	Ranks
Admiraloberstabsarzt	Surgeon general	Admiral (Germany)	three star rank	OF-8
Admiralstabsarzt	Rear admiral upper half (Dr.)	Vizeadmiral	two star rank	OF-7
Admiralarzt	Rear admiral lower half (Dr.)	Konteradmiral	one star rank	OF-6
Flottenarzt	Captain naval (Dr.)	Kapitän zur See	Captain (naval)	OF-5
Geschwaderarzt	Commander (Dr.)	Fregattenkapitän	Commander	OF-4
Marineoberstabsarzt	Lieutenant commander (Dr.)	Korvettenkapitän	Lieutenant commander	OF-3
Marinestabsarzt	Lieutenant naval (Dr.)	Kapitänleutnant	Lieutenant (naval)	OF-2
Marineoberarzt	Lieutenant junior grade (Dr.)	Oberleutnant zur See	Lieutenant (junior grade)	OF-1a
Marineassistenzarzt	Ensign (Dr.)	Leutnant zur See	Ensign	OF-1b

== Austria-Hungary ==
In the Austria-Hungarian Common Army (de: Gemeinsame Armee or k.u.k. Armee) there were the OF1a-ranks Oberarzt and Obertierarz until 1918. That particular ranks were comparable to the Oberleutnant/1st lieutenant OF1-rank as well.

Ranks k.u.k. Army until 1918				Ranks
Medical service	en	Equivalent Heer	en	Ranks
Generalstabsarzt	Staff-Surgeon General	Generalmajor	Major general	OF-6
Oberstabsarzt I. Klasse	Colonel (Dr. 1st class)	Oberst	Colonel	OF-5
Oberstabsarzt II. Klasse	Lieutenant colonel (Dr. 2nd class)	Oberstleutnant	Lieutenant colonel	OF-4
Stabsarzt	Major (Dr.)	Major		OF-3
Regimentsarzt I. Klasse	Captain (Dr. 1st class)	Hauptmann	Captain	OF-2
Regimentsarzt II. Klasse	Captain (Dr. 2nd class)	Hauptmann	Captain	OF-2
Oberarzt	First lieutenant (Dr.)	Oberleutnant	First lieutenant	OF-1
Assistenzarzt	Second lieutenant (Dr.)	Leutnant	Second lieutenant	OF-1
