= Unterarzt (military) =

Junior surgeon Unterarzt (UArzt/ UA)
- Collar patches and shoulder board
- Country: Nazi Germany
- Service branch: Heer (Wehrmacht)
- Rank: Officer Aspirant
- NATO rank code: OR-7
- Next higher rank: Assistenzarzt (OF-1)
- Next lower rank: no
- Equivalent ranks: See list

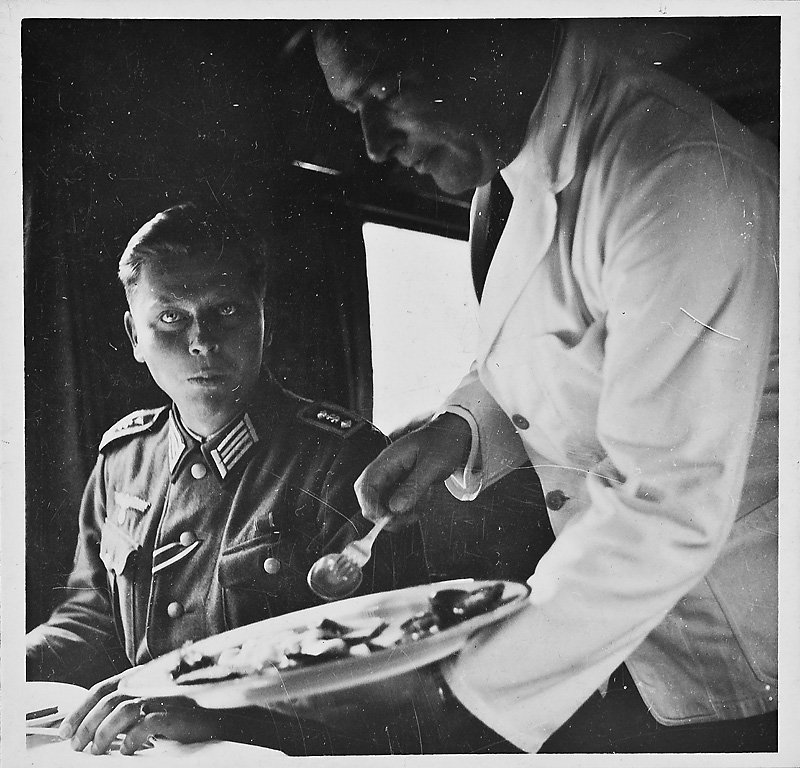
Unterazt in Norway

Unterarzt (short: UArzt or UA) was a military rank in the German Reichswehr and Wehrmacht until 1945.

It describes a qualified or licensed surgeon or dentist of the armed forces with the last or highest Officer Aspirant (O.A. or OA – de: Offizieranwärter) rank. According to the rank hierarchy it was comparable to Sergeant First Class (de: Oberfeldwebel) or Chief Petty Officer (de: Oberbootsmann) NATO-Rangcode OR7 in anglophone armed forces.

== Wehrmacht ==
=== Heer ===
In the German Wehrmacht from 1933 until 1945 there were the OR7-ranks Unterarzt (physician), Unterapotheker (pharmacologist), and Unterveterinär (veterinarian). It was also comparable to the Oberfähnrich/Oberfähnrich zur See OR7-rank.

In line to the so-called Reichsbesoldungsordnung (en: Reich's salary order), appendixes to the Salary law of the German Empire (de: Besoldungsgesetz des Deutschen Reiches) of 1927 (changes 1937 – 1940), the comparative ranks were as follows: C 15

- Oberfeldwebel (Heer and Luftwaffe)
- Unterarzt (medical service of the Wehrmacht, with voller ärztlicher Approbation, i.e. full medical license)
  - Feldunterarzt, from 1940 (ranking below Unterarzt, with Physikum, i.e. first medical examination)
- Unterveterinär (veterinarian service of the Wehrmacht)

The corps colour of the military Health Service Support (HSS) in German armed forces was traditional dark bluedark blue, and of the veterinarian service carmine red. This tradition was continued by the medical service corps in Heer and Luftwaffe of the Reichswehr and Wehrmacht. However, the corps colour of the Waffen-SS and Kriegsmarine HSS was cornflower blue.

junior Rank no	German medical officer rank Unterarzt (from 1940 also Feldunterarzt)	senior Rank; Assistenzarzt

== Address ==
The manner of formal addressing of military surgeons/dentists with the rank Unterarzt was, „Herr Unterarzt“.

Ranks Wehrmacht until 1945				Ranks
Medical service	en translation	Equivalent Heer	en equivalent	Ranks
Generaloberstabsarzt	Senior Staff-Surgeon General	General der Waffengattung	three star rank	OF-8
Generalstabsarzt	Staff-Surgeon General	Generalleutnant	two star rank	OF-7
Generalarzt	Surgeon General	Generalmajor	one star rank	OF-6
Oberstarzt	Colonel (Dr.)	Oberst	Colonel	OF-5
Oberfeldarzt	Lieutenant colonel (Dr.)	Oberstleutnant	Lieutenant colonel	OF-4
Oberstabsarzt	Major (Dr.)	Major		OF-3
Stabsarzt	Captain (Dr.)	Hauptmann	Captain (army)	OF-2
Oberarzt	First lieutenant (Dr.)	Oberleutnant	First lieutenant	OF-1a
Assistenzarzt	Second lieutenant (Dr.)	Leutnant	Second lieutenant	OF-1b
Unterarzt	Sergeant 1st Class (Dr.)	Fahnenjunker-Oberfeldwebel (Oberfähnrich)	Officer Aspirant	OR-7
Feldunterarzt (from 1940)	Sergeant 1st Class (Dr.)	Fahnenjunker-Oberfeldwebel (Oberfähnrich)	Officer Aspirant	OR-7
