= Corps colours of the German Army (1935–1945) =

Corps colours, or Troop-function colours (German: Waffenfarben) were worn in the German Army (Heer) from 1935 until 1945 in order to distinguish between several branches, special services, corps, rank groups, and appointments of the ministerial area, the general staff, and the Oberkommando der Wehrmacht (OKW). The corps colours were part of the pipings, gorget patches, shoulder straps, as well as part of the arabesque and lampasse of any general officer and flag officer. It was also part of heraldic flags, colours, standards, and guidons.

== Corps colours of the Heer ==
In the Heer there was a strictly defined systematic of corps colours on collar patchs, uniform piping, and coloured edging around the shoulder boards or shoulder straps. The corps colours of the Reichswehr (1921 until ca. 1935) were almost identical to these of the Wehrmacht.

=== Synoptic table and examples to military persons in uniform ===
The table below contains some corps colours and examples used by the German Army from 1935–45.

Troops, unit, appointment	Caps colour	Example		Remark
General officers (Festungsbaupioniere, Waffenoffiziere, and Feuerwerker); Artillery corps; Assault guns (Sturmgeschütze); Heavy flak	Deep red (Hochrot)			General der Waffengattung (arabesque and shoulder strap)
General officers (Festungsbaupioniere, Waffenoffiziere, and Feuerwerker); Artillery corps; Assault guns (Sturmgeschütze); Heavy flak	Deep red (Hochrot)			Standard of the artillery
Kriegsministerium (later Oberkommando der Wehrmacht); General staff corps officers; Veterinary service	Crimson (Karmesinrot)			Chief of the OKW until 1941; General staff corps officers (Oberkommando); General staff corps officers (others); Hufbeschlaglehrmeister (Farrier master instructor)
Field chaplains	Purple (#C154C1)	N/A		
Chemical troops; Nebelwerfer; Reichskriegsgericht	Bordeaux red (Bordo, bordeauxrot)			Unteroffizier (Fahnenjunker-Unterfeldwebel); Standard
Infantry; Motorised infantry; Local defence units (Landesschützen); Light Anti Aircraft (Flak)	White (White)			Oberstleutnant; Standard of the infantry
Panzertruppe; Motor maintenance troops (from 1942)	Rose-pink (Rosa)			Mannschaft; Troops standard
Signals	Lemon-yellow (#FFEE00)			Oberleutnant; Troops standard
Signals	Light-brown until 1937			Oberleutnant; Troops standard
Cavalry; Armored units with cavalry traditions	Golden-yellow (#F7B600)			Rittmeister; Troops standard
Feldgendarmerie; Recruiting and replacement (Wehrersatzwesen)	Orange-yellow (#ff8000)			Leutnant; Company pennant
Motorcycle infantry (Kradschützentruppe): Reconnaissance	Copper-brown (#DA8A67)			Oberleutnant
Panzergrenadier (Mechanized infantry)	Meadow-green (#60c000 from 1943)			Oberst
Jäger (light infantry troops [hunters]); Gebirgsjäger (mountain troops [mountain hunters]); Skijäger (ski troops [ski hunters])	Light green (Hellgrün)			Leutnant; Troops standard
Transportation troops (until 1942 (Fahrtruppen); Supply troops (from 1942) (Nachschubtruppen)	Blue (#00AEEF)			Major; Oberfeldwebel; Troops standard
Military medical service (Sanitätstruppe)	Medical-blue (dark-blue)		N/A	Feldunterarzt; Arabesque for administrative generals (OF6 to OF7)
War correspondents; Propaganda troops	Light-grey		N/A	Leutnant
Construction troops (Bautruppen)	Light-brown until 1943			Stabsfeldwebel; Troops standard
(Combat engineers) (Pioniere); Assault engineers; Armoured engineers; Fortress engineers; Technical troops (from 1941); Railway engineers; Railway operation troops (from 1943) (Eisenbahnbetriebstruppen); Construction engineers (from 1943) (Baupioniere)	Black			Stabsfeldwebel; Troops standard
Main colour of the uniform	Field-grey	Equal uniform colour for the Waffen-SS and military administration		

== Corps colours of the Heeresverwaltung ==
During World War II, officials of the “Army administration” (Heeresverwaltung, short HV), regardless of those serving in the Wehrmacht, war economy, or in military education facilities, etc., wore military rank insignias similar to those of the Wehrmacht.

=== Synoptic table and examples of Heer officials ===
Heer officials normally wore, in addition to their dark green main corps colour (Haupt-Waffenfarbe), a secondary colour (Nebenfarbe) denoting their branch. The Nebenfarbe was worn as piping surrounding the collar Litzen and underneath the shoulder boards on top of the dark green Waffenfarbe. In March 1940 distinct Nebenfarben were abolished and replaced with light grey.

The table below contains some corps colours and examples pertaining to military officials in uniform.

Troops, assignment/appointment	Corps colour	Remark
Militärverwaltung (universally)	Dark-green (#00703E)	Main colour of the uniform gorget and collar patch background
Officials with general officer rank; Officials of military districts (Wehrkreis)	Bright-red (Hochrot) (Red)	Army administration (OF8 to OF6)
Officials of the military judicial system	Corn flower blue (Kornblumenblau)	
Officials in headquarters or staff appointments/assignments; Officials on duty with the OKW or OKH	Crimson (Karmesinrot) (#960018)	
Officials of the remount service	Gold-yellow (Goldgelb) (#F7B600)	
Officials of standard branches, e.g. paymaster service (Zahlmeisterwesen)	White (Weiß) (white)	
Army officials of pharmaceutics	Light-green (Hellgrün)	
Officials of the technical services (fortress engineers, geological service, ballistics, etc.)	Black (Schwarz)	
Army officials of recruiting and replacement (Wehrersatzwesen)	Orange-red (Orange) (#ff8000)	
Teaching staff (non-technical) at Heer academies (Lehrpersonal an Heeresschulen)	Light-brown (Hellbraun)	
Officials of the "Reich´s court-martial" (Reichskriegsgericht)	Bordeaux red (#800032)	

== See also ==
- Waffenfarbe

== Sources ==
- Adolf Schlicht, John R. Angolia: Die deutsche Wehrmacht, Uniformierung und Ausrüstung 1933-1945
  Vol. 1: Das Heer (ISBN 3613013908), Motorbuch Verlag, Stuttgart 1992
  Vol. 3: Die Luftwaffe (ISBN 3-613-02001-7), Motorbuch Verlag, Stuttgart 1999
  (Very detailed information and discussion but no coloured images)
