= Joint Medical Service (Germany) =

Medical branch of the German Armed Forces

Joint Medical Service of the German Armed Forces (2000–2025) Health Services Command of the German Armed Forces (2025–)
- Zentraler Sanitätsdienst der Bundeswehr (2000–2025); Kommando Gesundheitsversorgung der Bundeswehr (2025–)
- Logo of the Joint Medical Service
- Active: 1 October 2000 – April 29, 2025 (as an independent command)
- Country: Germany
- Branch: Medical Corps
- Type: Higher Command Authority (KdoBeh, 2025–)
- Role: Military medicine
- Size: 20,000 personnel (2023)
- Part of: Bundeswehr Joint Support Command (2025 – present)
- Headquarters: Falckenstein Barracks, Koblenz
- Anniversaries: 1 October 2000
- Equipment: Hospitals and field hospitals; Rheinmetall MAN Military Vehicles YAK; Mercedes-Benz Unimog

Commanders
- Commander of the Health Services Command of the Bundeswehr: Generaloberstabsarzt Ralf Hoffmann (German Army)
- Stellvertretender Inspekteur des Zentralen Sanitätsdiensts der Bundeswehr: Generalstabsarzt Johannes Backus (German Army)
- Notable commanders: Ingo Patschke

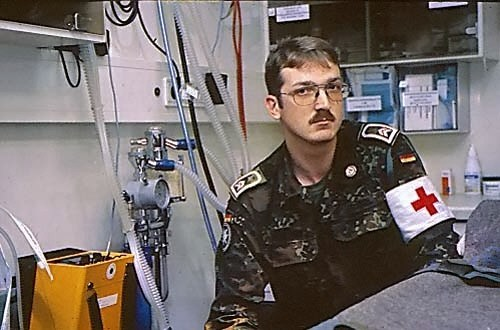
A medic during the NATO Implementation Force (IFOR) in Croatia, 1995

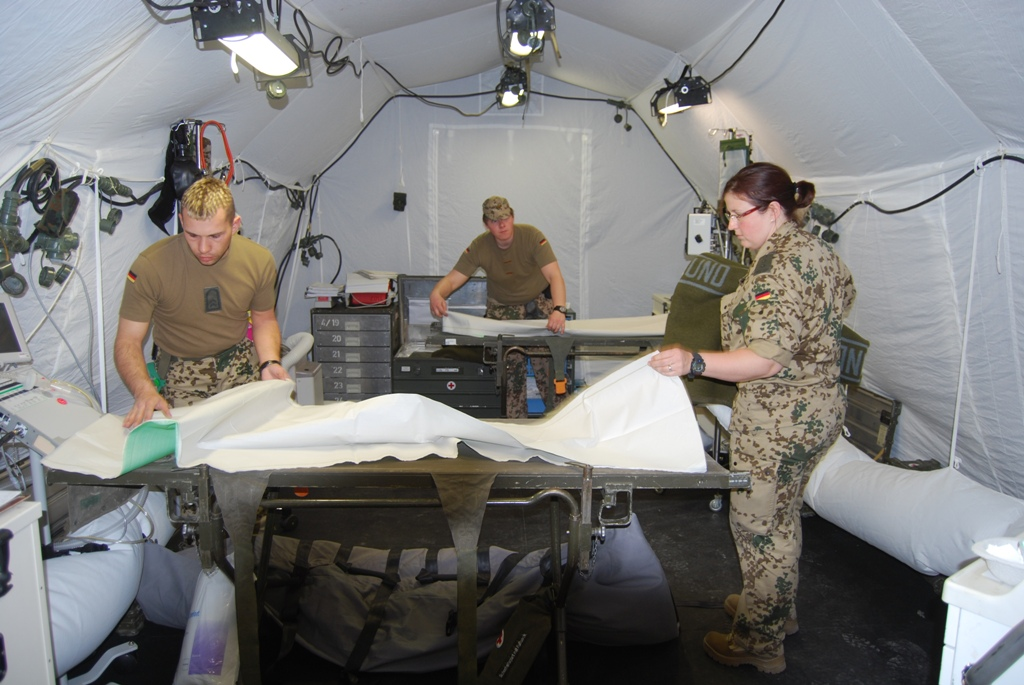
Field hospital exercise

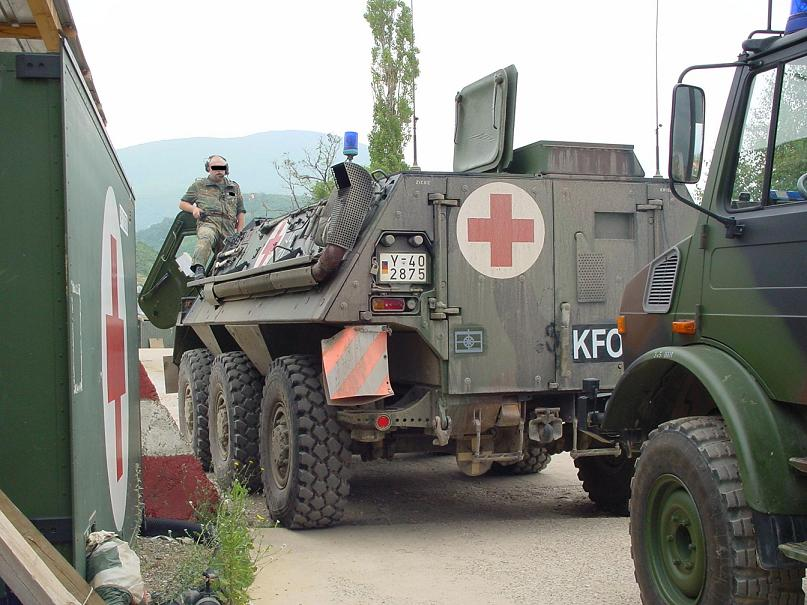
Vehicle of the Sanitätsdienst during KFOR

The Joint Medical Service (German: Zentraler Sanitätsdienst der Bundeswehr, short form: Zentraler Sanitätsdienst, pronounced [t͡sɛnˈtʁaːlɐ zaniˈtɛːt͡sˌdiːnst]) was a part of the Bundeswehr, the armed forces of Germany. It served all three armed services (Army, Navy and Air Force, as well as the Cyber and Information Domain Service). Members of the central medical corps remained members of their respective military branches. Only a few specialized medical units such as the medical care for divers and aircraft crews are not incorporated in the Joint Medical Service. Prior to 2002 each military branch had its own medical service. The services were then largely merged, forming the Joint Medical Service. In May 2021 the minister of defense Annegret Kramp-Karrenbauer together with Inspector General of the Bundeswehr Eberhard Zorn published a plan to dissolve the Joint Medical Service and to reintegrate its units into the army, navy, airforce and cyber command. It was dissolved in March 2025 and integrated as the Health Services Command of the German Armed Forces into the new Bundeswehr Joint Support Command.

== Structure ==
- Bundeswehr Joint Medical Service Headquarters in Koblenz
  - Bundeswehr Central Hospital in Koblenz
  - Bundeswehr Hospital in Hamburg
  - Bundeswehr Hospital in Berlin
  - Bundeswehr Hospital in Ulm
  - Bundeswehr Hospital in Westerstede
  - Bundeswehr Medical Academy at the Ernst-von-Bergmann-Kaserne in Munich
  - Medical Operational Support Command in Weißenfels
    - Rapid Deployable Medical Forces Command in Leer
    - 1st Medical Regiment in Weißenfels and Berlin
    - 2nd Medical Regiment in Rennerod and Koblenz
    - 3rd Medical Regiment in Dornstadt
    - Medical Demonstration Regiment in Feldkirchen
    - Medical Material Supply and Maintenance Center Blankenburg
    - Medical Material Supply and Maintenance Center Pfungstadt
    - Medical Material Supply and Maintenance Center Quakenbrück
  - Medical Regional Support Command in Diez
    - Medical Support Center Augustdorf
    - Medical Support Center Berlin
    - Medical Support Center Cochem
    - Medical Support Center Erfurt
    - Medical Support Center Hammelburg
    - Medical Support Center Kiel
    - Medical Support Center Cologne
    - Medical Support Center Kümmersbruck
    - Medical Support Center Munich
    - Medical Support Center Munster
    - Medical Support Center Neubrandenburg
    - Medical Support Center Stetten am kalten Markt
    - Medical Support Center Wilhelmshaven
    - Bundeswehr Sport Medicine Center in Warendorf

== Ranks of the Joint Medical Service ==
Army/Airforce: Generaloberstabsarzt (GenOStArzt)	Navy: Admiraloberstabsarzt (AdmOStArzt)

=== Army and Airforce ===
Human Medicine	Dentistry	Pharmacy	Veterinary	Army and Airforce	Foreign equivalents
Stabsarzt	Stabsarzt	Stabsapotheker	Stabsveterinär	Hauptmann	Captain
Oberstabsarzt	Oberstabsarzt	Oberstabsapotheker	Oberstabsveterinär	Major	Major
Oberfeldarzt	Oberfeldarzt	Oberfeldapotheker	Oberfeldveterinär	Oberstleutnant	Lieutenant Colonel
Oberstarzt	Oberstarzt	Oberstapotheker	Oberstveterinär	Oberst	Colonel
Generalarzt	Generalarzt	Generalapotheker	–	Brigadegeneral	Brigadier General
Generalstabsarzt	–	–	–	Generalmajor	Major General
Generaloberstabsarzt	–	–	–	Generalleutnant	Lieutenant General

=== Navy ===
Human Medicine	Dentistry	Pharmacy	Navy	Foreign equivalents
Stabsarzt	Stabsarzt	Stabsapotheker	Kapitänleutnant	Lieutenant
Oberstabsarzt	Oberstabsarzt	Oberstabsapotheker	Korvettenkapitän	Lieutenant Commander
Flottillenarzt	Flottillenarzt	Flottillenapotheker	Fregattenkapitän	Commander
Flottenarzt	Flottenarzt	Flottenapotheker	Kapitän zur See	Captain
Admiralarzt	Admiralarzt	Admiralapotheker	Flottillenadmiral	Commodore
Admiralstabsarzt	–	–	Konteradmiral	Rear admiral
Admiraloberstabsarzt	–	–	Vizeadmiral	Vice Admiral

== See also ==
- Military medicine
