= Brigadegeneral =

First rank of general officer of the German army

Brigadegeneral (Danish: Brigadegeneral; German: Brigadegeneral, pronounced [bʁiˈɡaːdəɡenəˌʁaːl]) is the Germanic variant of Brigadier general.

== Belgium ==
The rank of Brigadegeneral (Flemish: Brigadegeneraal; French: Général de Brigade) is used by the Belgian Land Component, Air Component and Medical Component.

Rank insignia

Land Component

Air Component

Medical Component

== Denmark ==
Brigade general Brigadegeneral
- Rank flag

- Army and Air force insignia

- Vehicle Star Plate
- Country: Denmark
- Service branch: Royal Danish Army; Royal Danish Air Force
- Rank group: General officer (Chefniveau)
- NATO rank code: OF-6
- Pay grade: M403
- Formation: 1983; 43 years ago
- Next higher rank: Generalmajor
- Next lower rank: Oberst
- Equivalent ranks: Flotilleadmiral

Related articles
- History: Brigader

Brigadegeneral is the lowest general officer rank in the Royal Danish Army and Royal Danish Air Force, placed above the rank oberst and below the rank of generalmajor.

The rank was introduced in 1983, following the adaptation of the STANAG 2116. It is ranked OF-6 within NATO and has a paygrade of M403, it is equivalent to flotilleadmiral.

The rank is either given to commanders of 1st and 2nd Brigade, or to oberst on extended international missions, as a temporary rank. The Surgeon General and the commander of the Health Services are also brigadegenerals.

The rank of brigader was used sporadically in the Danish army in the 18th century.

== Germany ==
Brigadier general Brigadegeneral
- Army and air force insignia
- Country: Germany
- Service branch: German Army; German Air Force
- Rank: One-star
- NATO rank code: OF-6
- Pay grade: B6
- Formation: 1956
- Next higher rank: Generalmajor
- Next lower rank: Oberst
- Equivalent ranks: Flottillenadmiral

Brigadegeneral, short BrigGen, is the lowest general officer rank in the German Army (Heer), German Air Force (Luftwaffe).

The rank is rated OF-6 in NATO, and is grade B6 in the pay rules of the Federal Ministry of Defence. It is equivalent to Flottillenadmiral in the German Navy (Marine) or to Generalarzt, Generalapotheker and Admiralarzt in the Zentraler Sanitätsdienst der Bundeswehr.

=== Rank insignia ===
On the shoulder straps (Heer, Luftwaffe) there is one golden pip (star) in golden oak leaves.

Heer	Luftwaffe	... to service uniform
Brigadegeneral (field suit) Brigadegeneral (retired)	Brigadegeneral (field suit) Generalarzt (human medicine) Generalarzt (dental medicine)	Arabesque (right) Arabesque (left)

== See also ==
- Comparative military ranks of World War I
- Comparative military ranks of World War II
