= Generaloberstabsarzt =

OF-8 ranks of German Joint Medical Service

Generaloberstabsarzt Admiraloberstabsarzt
- Navy and Army insignia
- Country: Germany
- Service branch: German Army; German Navy; German Air Force
- Abbreviation: GenOStArzt (Army & Air force); AdmOStArzt (Navy)
- Rank: German medical service rank
- NATO rank code: OF-8
- Next higher rank: None
- Next lower rank: Generalstabsarzt; Admiralstabsarzt

Generaloberstabsarzt (English: Senior Staff-Surgeon General) and its navy equivalant Admiraloberstabsarzt (English: Senior Staff-Surgeon Admiral) are the highest ranks of the Joint Medical Service of the German Bundeswehr. The equivalent OF-8 rank in the Heer and Luftwaffe is Generalleutnant and in the German Navy the Vizeadmiral.

== Bundeswehr ==
In accordance with traditions in German armed forces, both ranks might be used in Bundeswehr medical service. Normally the Bundeswehr Surgeon General of the medical service (de: Inspekteur des Sanitätsdienstes), or the Chief of Medical Operation´s Command (de: Kommandeur Sanitätsführungskommando) might be assigned. However, in future the Chief position might remain vacant, because the Deputy Surgeon General is mandated to command the Medical Operation´s Command.

Equivalent to that three-star ranks (NATO-Rangcode OF-8) are Generalleutnant ("Lieutenant general") of the Heer or Luftwaffe, and the Vizeadmiral (en: Vice admiral) of the Marine.

=== Address ===
The manner of formal addressing of military surgeons with the rank Generalarzt (OF-6, one-star rank), Generalstabsarzt (OF-7, two-star rank) or Generaloberstabsarzt is, "Herr/Frau Generalarzt". At the other hand, military surgeons with the rank Admiralarzt (OF-6, one-star rank), Admiralstabsarzt (OF-7, two-star rank) or Admiraloberstabsarzt is, "Herr/Frau Admiralarzt". Although the grammatically female form of Arzt is Ärztin, the military does not have separate gendered ranks, so the correct form of address for a female doctor is "Frau Stabsarzt".

=== Rank insignias ===
On the shoulder straps (Heer, Luftwaffe) there are three golden stars in golden oak leaves and the career insignia (de: Laufbahnabzeichen) as symbol of the medical standing, or course of studies. Regarding the Marine, the career insignia is in the middle of both sleeves, three centimeters above the cuff strips, and on the shoulder straps between strips and button.

junior Rank; Generalstabsarzt; Admiralstabsarzt	German medical officer rank Generaloberstabsarzt; Admiraloberstabsarzt	senior Rank no

Generaloberstabsarzt (Human medicine) Generaloberstabsarzt (Dental medicine)	Generaloberstabsarzt (Human medicine) Generaloberstabsarzt (field uniform)	Admiraloberstabsarzt (Human medicine) Mounting loop

== Wehrmacht ==
Senior Staff-Surgeon General Generaloberstabsarzt (GenOStArzt)
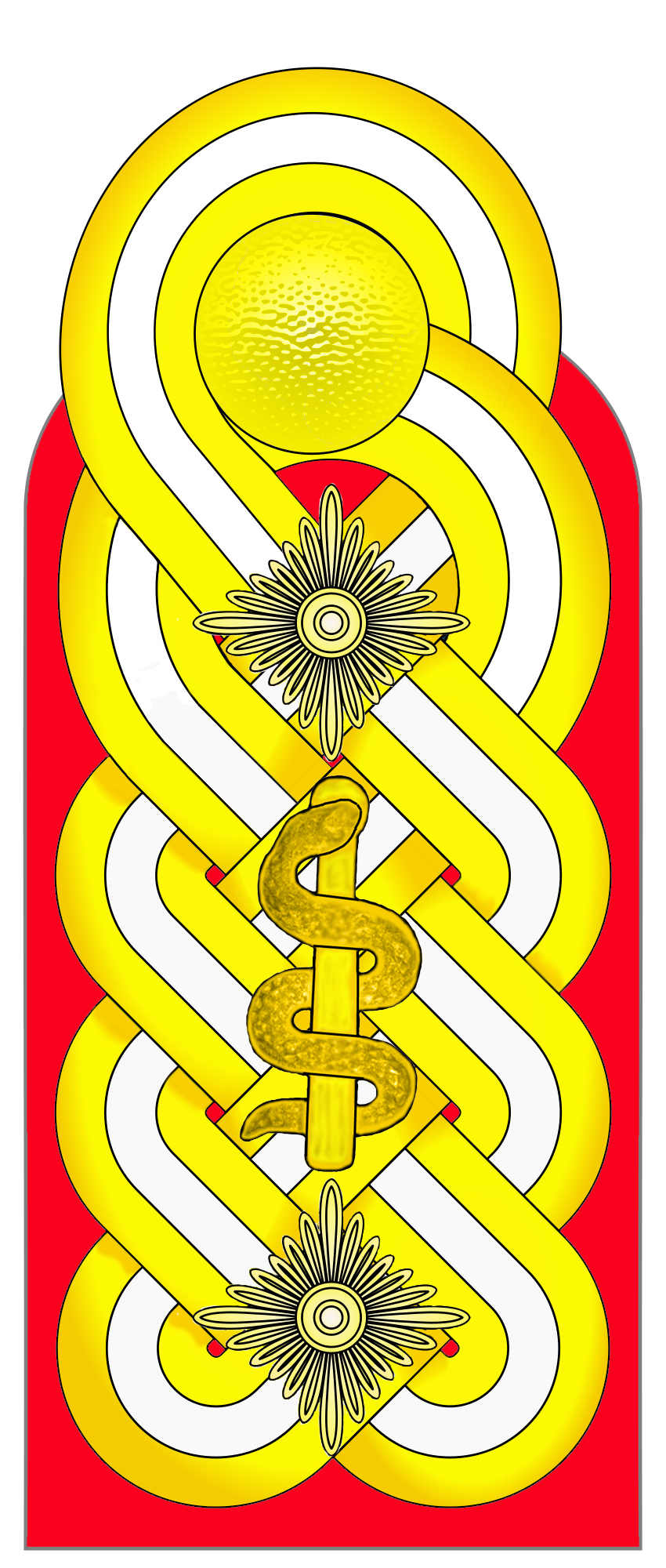
- Arabesque (until 1944) shoulder board
- Country: Nazi Germany
- Service branch: German Army
- Rank: Three-star
- NATO rank code: OF-8
- Next higher rank: None
- Next lower rank: Generalstabsarzt
- Equivalent ranks: See list

The General of the branch grade Generaloberstabsarzt was the most senior ranks of the medical service of the German Wehrmacht 1933 to 1945.

Siegfried Handloser was assigned to Generaloberstabsarzt of the Wehrmacht. He was simultaneous "Chief of the Wehrmacht's Medical Service in Supreme Command of the Wehrmacht" (Chef des Wehrmachtsanitätswesens im Oberkommando der Wehrmacht) as of July 28, 1942. Curt Schulze was Generaloberstabveterinär of the Wehrmacht.

=== Comparative ranks ===
Generaloberstabsarzt of the Wehrmacht was comparable to the General of the branch (OF8, three stars), as well as to the Obergruppenführer and General of the Waffen-SS.

In line to the so-called Reichsbesoldungsordnung (en: Reich's salary order), appendixes to the Salary law of the German Empire (de: Besoldungsgesetz des Deutschen Reiches) of 1927 (changes 1937 – 1940), the comparative ranks were as follows: C 1

- General of the branch (Heer and Luftwaffe)
- Admiral (Kriegsmarine)
- Generaloberstabsarzt, from 1934 (medical service of the Wehrmacht)
- Generaloberstabsveterinär, from 1934 (veterinarian service of the Wehrmacht)

Ranks Wehrmacht until 1945				Ranks
Medical service	en translation	Equivalent Heer	en equivalent	Ranks
Generaloberstabsarzt	Senior Staff-Surgeon General	General der Waffengattung	three star rank	OF-8
Generalstabsarzt	Staff-Surgeon General	Generalleutnant	two star rank	OF-7
Generalarzt	Surgeon General	Generalmajor	one star rank	OF-6
Oberstarzt	Colonel (Dr.)	Oberst	Colonel	OF-5
Oberfeldarzt	Lieutenant colonel (Dr.)	Oberstleutnant	Lieutenant colonel	OF-4
Oberstabsarzt	Major (Dr.)	Major		OF-3
Stabsarzt	Captain (Dr.)	Hauptmann	Captain (army)	OF-2
Oberarzt	First lieutenant (Dr.)	Oberleutnant	First lieutenant	OF-1a
Assistenzarzt	Second lieutenant (Dr.)	Leutnant	Second lieutenant	OF-1b
Unterarzt	Sergeant 1st Class (Dr.)	Fahnenjunker-Oberfeldwebel	Officer Aspirant	OR-7
Feldunterarzt (from 1940)	Sergeant 1st Class (Dr.)	Fahnenjunker-Oberfeldwebel	Officer Aspirant	OR-7

See also main article
Ranks and insignia of the German Army (1935–1945)

=== Kriegsmarine ===
Rank designations of the Kriegsmarine as to Match 30, 1934, are contained in the table below.

Ranks Kriegsmarine (medical service)				Ranks
Medical service	en translation	Equivalent Kriegsmarine	en equivalent	Ranks
Admiraloberstabsarzt	Surgeon general	Admiral (Germany)	three star rank	OF-8
Admiralstabsarzt	Rear admiral upper half (Dr.)	Vizeadmiral	two star rank	OF-7
Admiralarzt	Rear admiral lower half (Dr.)	Konteradmiral	one star rank	OF-6
Flottenarzt	Captain naval (Dr.)	Kapitän zur See	Captain (naval)	OF-5
Geschwaderarzt	Commander (Dr.)	Fregattenkapitän	Commander	OF-4
Marineoberstabsarzt	Lieutenant commander (Dr.)	Korvettenkapitän	Lieutenant commander	OF-3
Marinestabsarzt	Lieutenant naval (Dr.)	Kapitänleutnant	Lieutenant (naval)	OF-2
Marineoberarzt	Lieutenant junior grade (Dr.)	Oberleutnant zur See	Lieutenant (junior grade)	OF-1a
Marineassistenzarzt	Ensign (Dr.)	Leutnant zur See	Ensign	OF-1b

== Other armed forces ==
Stars, shoulder strap, and cuff stripes of a US Surgeon General

- Surgeon General of the United States
- Surgeon General (Canada)
- Surgeon-General (United Kingdom)
- Chief Medical Officer (Ireland)
- Chief Medical Officer (United Kingdom)

== Relevant literature ==
- Neumann, Alexander: Arzttum ist immer Kämpfertum - Die Heeressanitätsinspektion und das Amt "Chef des Wehrmachtsanitätswesens" im Zweiten Weltkrieg (1939-1945), 2005. ISBN 3-7700-1618-1
- Süß, Winfried: Der "Völkskörper" im Krieg: Gesundheitspolitik, Gesundheitsverhältnisse und Krankenmord im nationalsozialistischen Deutschland 1939–1945, 2003. ISBN 3-486-56719-5
