= Surgeon general =

Surgeon general (pl.: surgeons general) is a title used in several Commonwealth countries and most NATO nations to refer either to a senior military medical officer or to a senior uniformed physician commissioned by the government and entrusted with public health responsibilities. The title originated in the 17th century, as military units acquired their own physicians.

== United Kingdom ==
In the United Kingdom, the Surgeon General is the professional head of the military medical services and carries the rank of rear admiral, major general, or air vice marshal. Formerly, the post was held by the senior of the three individual service medical directors and carried the rank of vice admiral, lieutenant general, or air marshal. Until 1918, surgeon-general was also the most senior rank in the Royal Army Medical Corps.

== United States ==
In the United States, the chief public health officer is the Surgeon General of the United States, and a small number of states have state surgeons general. Moreover, three of the U.S. military services have their own surgeon general, namely the Surgeon General of the United States Army, Surgeon General of the United States Navy, and Surgeon General of the United States Air Force.

== See also ==
- Chief Medical Officer (Ireland)
- Chief Medical Officer (United Kingdom)
- Committee of Chiefs of Military Medical Services in NATO
- Generalarzt
- Generaloberstabsarzt
- Surgeon General (Canada)
- Surgeon General (Denmark)
- Surgeon General of the United States
- Surgeon General of the United States Air Force and United States Space Force
- Surgeon General of the United States Army
- Surgeon General of the United States Navy
- Surgeon-General of the Swedish Armed Forces
- Surgeon-General (United Kingdom)
