= Oiva =

Oiva is a Finnish masculine given name meaning "splendid."

It may refer to:

== Men ==
- Oiva Halmetoja (1920-2007), Finnish Olympic hammer thrower
- Oiva Jukkola (born 2002), Finnish professional footballer
- Oiva Laaksonen (born 2003), Finnish professional footballer
- Oiva Lommi (1922-2000), Finnish Olympic rower
- Oiva Olenius (1890-1968), Finnish military leader
- Oiva Paloheimo (1910–1973), Finnish author
- Oiva Sala (1900-1980), Finnish actor
- Oiva Timonen (1920–1998), Finnish Olympic wrestler
- Oiva Toikka (1931–2019), Finnish glass designer
- Oiva Tuominen (1908-1976), Finnish fighter ace
- Oiva Turunen (1910-1991), Finnish business executive and politician
- Oiva Tuulio (1878-1941), Finnish linguist
- Oiva Tylli (1914-1975), Finnish Olympic sports shooter
- Oiva Virtanen (1929-1992), Finnish Olympic basketball player

== See also ==
- Oiva (restaurant), a restaurant in Helsinki
