= Luftwaffe personnel structure =

Luftwaffe personnel structure consisted of two broad categories, Wehrmachtangehörige or members of the armed forces, and Wehrmachtgefolge or auxiliaries of the armed forces.

The Wehrmachtangehörige consisted of Soldaten or military personnel in a limited sense (officers and enlisted), and Beamten or military officials, either belonging to the general category of Wehrmachtbeamte, or one of four Sondergruppen (special groups of officials): Engineers, Navigators, Aircraft Pilots or Flying Safety. In 1944 supply officers and judge-advocates were transferred from the Officials category, to the Soldiers category as officers of the Truppensonderdienst. As a war-time measure, Sonderführers were introduced, filling positions normally held by trained officers or non-commissioned officers without having the required military training. Beamte auf Kriegsdauer (war-time officials) were filling positions normally held by trained officials, without having the required civil service training.

The Wehrmachtgefolge consisted in peace-time of civilian salaried employees and workers of the Luftwaffe. During the war several new classes of full or par time duty personnel were added to the Wehrmachtgefolge, such as: Luftschutzwarndienst, the male personnel of the air raid warning service; Sicherheits- und Hilfsdienst, the barracked security and assistance service of the civil defense; Luftwaffenhelferinnen, the female Luftwaffe auxiliaries; Luftwaffenhelfer, underage male youth serving anti-aircraft batteries between school or work; Flakwehrmänner, male workers in reserved occupations serving anti-aircraft batteries during air-raids. The Wehrmachtgefolge also contained units from paramilitary organizations, as far as they were subordinated to the Luftwaffe during the war, such as: Reichsarbeitsdienst, National Socialist Motor Corps, and Organisation Todt.

== Overview ==
Luftwaffe strength 1. Sept. 1943
Units	Ration strength
Luftwaffe in the area of the field army	990,000
Field units of the Luftwaffe in the home war zone, General Government, Ostland and Ukraine	393,000
Luftwaffe replacement units	363,000
Luftwaffe Field Divisions	150,000
Total	1,896,000

Personnel structure of the Luftwaffe
Status	Wehrmachtangehörige			Wehrmachtgefolge
	Military line	Military non-line	Officials	Luftwaffe auxiliaries
Regular and reserve	Unrestricted line officers: General staff officers; Troop officers; Restricted line officers: Ordnance officers; Engineering officers; Enlisted	Special career officers: Medical Officers; Directors of music; Special troop officers: Supply officers; Judge-advocates	Military officials: Air Engineer Corps; Air Navigator Corps; Aircraft Pilot Corps; Flying Safety Service; Wehrmachtbeamte	Civilian employees of the Luftwaffe
War time reinforcement	Sonderführer		Beamte auf Kriegsdauer	Air raid warning service; Security- and assistance service; Female auxiliaries; Luftwaffenhelfer; Flak-auxiliaries; Detachments from paramilitary formations in the service of the Luftwaffe: Reichsarbeitsdienst; National Socialist Motor Corps; Technische Nothilfe; Organisation Todt

== Military personnel ==
Soldaten, or military personnel in a limited sense, consisted of officers, noncommissioned officers and airmen, belonging to the flying troops, fallschirmjäger, air defense artillery, air signal troops, construction units, and medical units, as well the Luftwaffe ground combat units, such as the Division "Hermann Goering" and the Luftwaffe field divisions. They also included the special career officers such as medical officers and directors of music, and the special troop officers such as supply officers and judge advocates.

=== Officers ===
==== Corps ====
The commissioned officers of the Luftwaffe could either be non-restricted or restricted line officers, or non-line officers. Non-restricted officers were Truppenoffiziere, troop officers, and Generalstabsoffiziere, general staff officers. Resttricted line officers were ordnance officers and engineering officers. Non-line officers were of two kinds, special career officers, Offiziere der Sonderlaufbahnen, contained medical officers and directors of music, while Truppensonderdienst, the special troop officers, were created in 1944 by the transfer of supply officers and judge advocates from the military officials class.

Corps	Meaning
Generalstabsoffiziere	General Staff Officers
Truppenoffiziere	Troop Officers
Sanitätsoffiziere	Medical Officers
Ingenieuroffiziere des Flugwesens	Air Force Engineer Officers
Offiziere im waffentechnischem Dienst	Ordnance Officers
Musikinspizienten und Musikmeister	Inspectors and Directors of Music
Verwaltungsdienst (TSD)	Supply Officers
Wehrmachtrichter (TSD)	Judge Advocates

The Air force engineer officers were to replace the Air engineers of the military officials class, but only a very limited number of such officers were trained before the end of the war. The Air engineering officials were supposed to transfer to the engineering officer career, but that measure was postponed until the end of the war. No engineering officer reached higher rank than First Lieutenant at the end of the war. The highest rank of the Ordnance officer corps was Colonel. The corps was abolished in 1944, and its 193 members transferred to the troop officer corps.

Ranks of Luftwaffe officers
General Staff Officers	Troop Officers	Air Force Engineer Officers	Ordnance Officer	Medical Officers	Supply Officers 1944	Judge Advocates 1944	Music Directors Inspectors
-	Leutnant	Leutnant (Ing.)	Leutnant (W)	Assistenzarzt	Zahlmeister	-	Musikmeister
-	Oberleutnant	Oberleutnant (Ing.)	Oberleutnant (W)	Oberarzt	Oberzahlmeister	-	Obermusikmeister
Hauptmann i.G.	Hauptmann	-	Hauptmann (W)	Stabsarzt	Stabsintendant	Stabsrichter	Stabsmusikmeister
Major i.G.	Major	-	Major (W)	Oberstabsarzt	Oberstabsintendant	Oberstabsrichter	Musikinspizient
Oberstleutnant i.G.	Oberstleutnant	-	Oberstleutnant (W)	Oberfeldarzt	Oberfeldintendant	Oberfeldrichter	Obermusikinspizient
Oberst i.G.	Oberst	-	Oberst (W)	Oberstarzt	Oberstintendant	Oberstrichter	-
Generalmajor		-	-	Generalarzt	Generalintendant	Generalrichter	-
Generalleutnant		-	-	Generalstabsarzt	Generalstabsintendant	Generalstabrichter	-
General der Luftwaffe		-	-	-	-	-	-
Generaloberst		-	-	-	-	-	-
Generalfeldmarschall		-	-	-	-	-	-
Reichsmarschall		-	-	-	-	-	-

==== Commissions ====
The officers of the several corps were listed in different seniority lists depending on their service conditions:

Seniority list	Category	Service conditions
A	aktive Offiziere	Regular commission
B	Ergänzungsoffiziere	Supplementary commission
C	Offiziere des Beurlaubtenstandes	Reserve commission
D	Kriegsoffiziere	Temporary war commission
E	Offiziere zur Verfügung	Officers to disposal
E	Offiziere zur Dienstleistung	Officers to disposal in actual service
E	Offiziere ausser Dienst	Retired officers

Ergängzungsoffiziere were former officers born in 1882 or later, serving in staff and administrative positions. Offiziere der Beurlaubtenstandes were reserve officers; consisting of Reserveoffiziere (under 35 years of age), and Landwehroffiziere (35 years old and older) until 1940, when the two categories were merged. Kriegsoffiziere were officers promoted from the ranks and given temporary commissions for the duration of the war. Offiziere zur Verfügung were former officers subject to recall at mobilization. Such officers were called Offiziere zur Dienstleistung when recalled.

=== Enlisted ===
Each branch of the Luftwaffe had a number of Dienstlaufbahngruppen (career groups) for non-commissioned officers and airmen, further subdivided into Dienstlaufbahnen (service careers).

==== Flying Troops ====
The Flying Troops had three career croups, Air Crew, Aircraft Engineering, and General Service.

Air Crew

Airplane Pílot, Aircraft Observer, Auxiliary Observer, Bombardier, Air Signaller (Aerial Gunner), Flight Engineer (Aerial Gunner), Aerial Gunner, and Paratrooper.

Aircraft Engineering

Aircraft Engineering Technician, Airframe Mechanic, Airplane Engine Mechanic, Airplane Electrical Mechanic, Airplane Precision Mechanic, Airplane Bomb Armorer, Airplane Weapons Armorer, Aerial Photography Technician, Airplane Signals Mechanic, and Parachute Rigger and Survival Equipmentman.

General Service

Ground Communications, Motor Transportation, Supply Clerk, Ammunition Technician, Hauptfeldwebel (First Sergeant), HQ Sergeant, Supply Technician (Automotive), Supply Technician (Aircraft), Supply Technician (Weapons/Gas Protection), Supply Technician (General), Clothing Clerk, Accountant, Subsistence NCO, Administrative Clerk, Small Boat Crew, Air Traffic Control, Musician, Medical Technician, and Military Official Candidate.

==== Air Defense Artillery ====
The Air Defense Artillery had two careers groups, Artillery, and General Service.

Artillery

Anti-aircraft Artillery Personnel, Motor Transportation Personnel, Communications.

General Service

The same as the general service of the Flying Troops, with the addition of Supply Technician (Communications), and Supply Technician (Searchlight), and without Supply Technician (Aircraft).

==== Air Signal Troops ====
The Air Signal Troops had two career groups, Signals, and General Service.

Signals

General, Flight Radio Operator, Aircraft Radio, Radio Technical Sergeant, Telephone Technical Sergeant, Supply Technician (Communications), Armorer.

General Service

The same as the general service of the Flying Troops, without Supply Technician (Aircraft).

==== Other branches ====
In addition to the three major branches, flying troops, air defense artillery, and air signal troops, the Luftwaffe had several other branches. In existence at the beginning of the war was the medical troops (Sanitätstruppen), and the Reichsluftaufsicht or the National Flying Safety Service, which was staffed both by military personnel and a special group of Beamten (see below). During the war special Luftwaffe construction units (Luftwaffen-Bauverbände) were added. A special ground-combat unit General Göring existed since 1935, and airborne Fallschirmjäger units since 1938; during the war both expanded into army corps, with the same complement of ground-combat branches that existed in the army. In addition, the Luftwaffe in 1942 formed a number field divisions of excess personnel, that, however, after about a year was absorbed by the German Army. There were even veterinary units; the enlisted men belonging to the Luftwaffe, and the veterinary officers to the army.

Ranks of Luftwaffe non-commissioned officers and men
Flying Troops Fallschirmjäger Air Signal Troops Flying Safety Service Construction Units Other branches of the Göring units and the field divisions	Air Defense Artillery Artillery and Anti-aircraft artillery of the Göring units, the Fallschirmjäger, and the field divisions	Medical troops Veterinary units
Mannschaften
Flieger, Fallschirmjäger, Funker, Bausoldat, Jäger, Grenadier, Füsilier, Panzerschütze, Pionier, Kraftfahrer, Feldgendarm	Kanonier; Panzerjäger	Sanitätssoldat; Veterinärsoldat
Gefreiter		Sanitätsgefreiter; Veterinärgefreiter
Obergefreiter		Sanitätsobergefreiter; Veterinärobergefreiter
Hauptgefreiter; Promotion to this rank seized at the beginning of the war. The only holders were men promoted before the war. Those still holding this rank in 1944 were given the new rank of Stabsgefreiter.		Sanitätshauptgefreiter; Veterinärhauptgefreiter
Unteroffiziere
Unteroffizier; Oberjäger [Fallschirmjäger]	Unteroffizier	Sanitätsunteroffizier; Veterinärunteroffizier
Unterfeldwebel	Unterwachtmeister	Sanitätsunterfeldwebel; Veterinärunterwachtmeister
Feldwebel	Wachtmeister	Sanitätsfeldwebel; Veterinärwachtmeister
Oberfeldwebel	Oberwachtmeister	Sanitätsoberfeldwebel; Veterinäroberwachtmeister
Stabsfeldwebel	Stabswachtmeister	Sanitätsstabsfeldwebel; Veterinärstabswachtmeister

=== Sonderführer ===
In the Luftwaffe war time tables of organization, certain positions could be filled with personnel not possessing the required military training, if properly trained personnel were not available. Such Sonderführer (Specialist Leaders), should have a civilian education or training qualifying them for the technical side of the position to be filled, and preferably some sort of leadership experience or training. Specialist Leaders did not hold military rank as such, but had titles that denoted the equivalent rank level of the positions held. If they were not needed as Specialist Leaders any more, they would to revert to their basic military rank. Specialist Leaders with the equivalent rank level of non-commissioned officers were abolished in 1942; the incumbents transferred to the non-commissioned corps if qualified.

Rank equivalents and titles of Luftwaffe Sonderführers
Equivalent rank level	Level	General titles	Titles for interpreters	Titles for doctors
Unteroffizier	Specialist Leader in the position of a Sergeant	Sonderfüher (G)	-	-
Oberfeldwebel	Specialist Leader in the position of a Technical Sergeant	Sonderfüher (O)	-	-
Leutnant	Specialist Leader in the position of a First or Second Lieutenant	Sonderfüher (Z)	Dolmetscher (Z)	Hilfsartz
Hautpmann	Specialist Leader in the position of a Captain	Sonderfüher (K)	Dolmetscher (K)	Kriegsarzt
Major	Specialist Leader in the position of a Field Officer	Sonderfüher (B)	-	Oberkriegsarzt

== Military officials ==
Luftwaffe military officials 1944
Groups	Personnel strength
Wehrmachtbeamte (Note: Including Beamte auf Kriegsdauer.)	~1,000,000
Air Engineers	2,500
Air Navigators	200
Aircraft Pilots	..
Flying Safety	..

Military officials were civil servants that served in the Luftwaffe in technical, administrative, legal, and other positions. They were not civilian employees, as they were uniformed, often serving with advanced units on air bases in enemy territory. Yet the personnel structure of the military officials were not military - with officers, non-commissioned officers, and airmen - but the same as the ordinary civil service, with four different career levels. Although they wore insignia denoting their equivalent rank, they did not have military ranks, but civil service grades, and were not paid after the military pay scales, but according to their civil service grade. Most officials were Wehrmachtbeamte, but there were also four special groups of military officials: the air engineers, the air navigators, the aircraft pilots, and the flying safety officials.

Career levels
Career level	Educational requirements	Candidate period	Equivalent ranks as permanent officials in the Luftwaffe
einfacher Dienst (lower)	Volksschule and for technical occupations also having served in a lower technical capacity in the Luftwaffe or the Reichsarbeitsdienst, or being a trained journeyman or master craftsman	six months	Feldwebel - Oberfeldwebel
mittlerer Dienst (intermediate)	Volksschule and for technical occupations also having served in a middle technical capacity in the Luftwaffe or the Reichsarbeitsdienst, or being a trained master craftsman, or having a diploma from a technical school, or being promoted from the lower career	one year	Stabsfeldwebel - Oberleutnant
gehobener Dienst (elevated)	High school diploma or a diploma from a business school, and for direct entry without a candidate period, a diploma in engineering from a technical school	two years or more	Oberleutnant - Oberstleutnant
höherer Dienst (higher )	University degree	Until Staatsexamen	Hauptmann - Generalleutnant

Most of the military officials of the Luftwaffe were non-commissioned officers having completed their 12 year's service obligation. After being given a civilian education at an administrative or technical military school (Wehrmachtfachschule), they entered the ranks of the military officials as military candidates (Militäranwärter). Abschlussprüfung I (first level exam) gave access to the middle career, while a second level exam opened up the elevated career. The elevated career was also open to young men with Abitur having completed the two your compulsory military service. The higher service was recruited through direct-entry candidates with a university degree, most of which also were reserve officers.

=== Air Engineer Corps ===
Becoming a member of the Ingenieurkorps der Luftwaffe required completion of the two year compulsory military service, being commissioned as a reserve officer, and having a Diplomingenieur-degree in aircraft construction, as well having passed the state exam for Flugbaumeisters (aircraft designers). Diploma Engineers with three years employment as civilian engineers of the Luftwaffe were also accepted.

=== Air Navigator Corps ===
The Nautikerkorps der Luftwaffe was founded in 1938, for air surveying and non-combat navigation duties; all members were military officials of the elevated career recruited as Militäranwärter from former sergeant-navigators. New appointments in the corps ended in 1941. Suitable and willing navigators where then transferred to the officer corps of the flying troops. Of the 295 officials in the navigator corps, 81 had transferred to the officer corps at the beginning of 1942.

=== Aircraft Pilot Corps ===
The Flugzeugführerkorps was created in 1940, its members being former sergeant-pilots that began their new career as Militäranwärter of the elevated service. They served in positions as flight instructors, weather pilots, test pilots, and as pilots of other similar non-combat activities.

=== Flying Safety Officials ===
The Reichsluftaufsicht, the National Flying Safety Service, was staffed both with Soldaten and special group Beamten of the middle, elevated, and higher careers.

Pay grades, titles and equivalent ranks of Engineers, Navigators, Pilots, and Flying Safety Officials
Pay grade	Air Engineers	Air Navigators	Pay Grade	Aircraft Pilots	Flying Safety	Equivalent Rank
–	–	–	A8a	–	Untermeister	Stabsfeldwebel
–	–	–	A7b	–	Meister	Leutnant
–	–	–	A5b	–	Obermeister	Oberleutnant
–	–	–	A4c2	–	Inspektor	Oberleutnant
JL8	Flieger-Ingenieur	–	A4c2	Flugführer	–	Leutnant
JL7	Flieger-Oberingenieur	Flieger-Obernautiker	A4c2	Oberflugführer	–	Oberleutnant
JL6	Flieger-Hauptingenieur	Flieger-Hauptnautiker	A4b1	Oberflugführer I. klasse Hauptflugführer	Oberinspektor	Hauptmann
–	–	–	A2c2	–	Regierungsassessor; Regierungsrat	Hauptmann
–	–	–	A2c2	–	Regierungsrat	Hauptmann
–	–	–	A2c2	–	Regierungsrat	Major (Note: After three years in the grade.)
JL5	Flieger-Stabsingenieur	Flieger-Stabsnautiker	A3b	Stabsflugführer; Stabsflugführer I. klasse	Amtmann; Amtsrat	Major
JL4	Flieger-Oberstabsingenieur	–	A2b	–	Oberregierungsrat	Oberstleutnant
JL3	Flieger-Oberstingenieur	–	–	–	–	Oberst
JL2	Flieger-Generalingenieur	-	–	–	–	Generalmajor
JL1	Flieger-Generalstabsingenieur	–	–	–	–	Generalleutnant

=== Wehrmachtbeamte ===
The Wehrmachtsbeamte of the Luftwaffe were administrative, technical and legal specialists and craftsmen, belonging to a large number of Fachrichtungen (occupational groups), according to their profession, occupation or area of specialization.

Occupational Groups of the Wehrmachtbeamte:

- General Administration
- Construction Administration
- Agricultural Service
- Surveying Service
- Mechanical Service
- Electrical Service
- Craftsmen at the Clothing Depots
- Reichskriegsgericht
- Legal Service
- Geheime Feldpolizei
- Photo Service
- Motor Transport Service
- Weapons Technical Service
- Technical Aircraft Service
- Cartographic Service
- Printing Service
- Other Craftsmen
- Technical Schools
- Libraries
- Medical Service
- Veterinary Service
- Pharmacy Service
- Chemical Service
- Luftwaffe War Science Section
- Psychologists
- Signal Service
- National Weather Service
- Military Geology Service
- Air Traffic Control Service
- Fire Fighting Officials
- Forestry Officials
- Personnel Replacement System

Pay grades, civil service grades and equivalent ranks of Wehrmachtbeamte in General Administrative Service
Pay grade	Lower career	Intermediate career	Elevated career	Higher career	Rank equivalent
A10a	Amtsgehilfe	-	-	-	Feldwebel
A10a	Amtsgehilfe	-	-	-	Oberfeldwebel (Note: After ten years in the grade.)
A8a	-	Regierungsassistent	-	-	Stabsfeldwebel
A7b	-	Regierungssekretär	-	-	Leutnant
A5b	-	Regierungsobersekretär	-	-	Oberleutnant
A4c2	-	-	Regierungsinspektor	-	Oberleutnant
A4b1	-	-	Regierungsoberinspektor	-	Hauptmann
A3b	-	-	Verwaltungsamtmann	-	Hauptmann
A3b	-	-	Verwaltungsamtmann	-	Major (Note: After three years in the grade.)
A2c2	-	-	-	Regierungsassessor; Regierungsrat	Hauptmann
A2c2	-	-	-	Regierungsrat	Hauptmann
A2c2	-	-	-	Regierungsrat	Major
A2d	-	-	Verwaltungsoberamtmann; Regierungsamtsrat	-	Major
A2b	-	-	-	Regierungsoberrat	Oberstleutnant
A1b	-	-	-	Regierungsdirektor	Oberst
A1a	-	-	-	Ministerialrat	Oberst
B7a	-	-	-	Ministerialdirigent	Generalmajor
B6	-	-	-	Ministerialdirektor	Generalleutnant

=== War-time officials ===
The Beamte auf Kriegsdauer, were the military officialdom's equivalent of Sonderführer; a Luftwaffe member filling a Beamter-position in the tables of organization without having gone through the required training during the candidate period, but possessing adequate technical or professional competence to fill such a slot on an emergency basis. War-time officials were designated with the appendix a. Kr. (abbreviation for auf Kriegsdauer) after the grade title of the position they were filling. For example: Werkmeister a. Kr., or Regierungsinspektor a. Kr. The Air Engineer Corps, the Air Navigation Corps, and the Wehrmachtbeamte were all augmented with war-time officials. By 1944 the war-time Wehrmachtbeamte of the higher service were placed in pay grade A2c2; of the elevated service, in pay grade A4c2; of the middle career in pay grade A8a; and of the lower career in pay grade A10b. War-time engineers and navigators were placed in pay grades JL5 or JL8 depending on position filled.

== Luftwaffe auxiliaries ==
Before and during the war, the Wehrmachtgefolge, or the auxiliaries, of the Luftwaffe contained the following categories:

- Civilian workers and salaried employees of the Luftwaffe, such as air base fire fighters, Fliegerisch tätigen Angestellten der Luftwaffe (aviation employees of the Luftwaffe), the civilian maritime personnel of the Luftwaffe Seenotdienst or the civilian employees of the Generalluftzeugmeister.
- Civilian workers and salaried employees assigned tasks in the Luftwaffe by their employers, such as personnel of the Frontreparaturbetriebe (front repair stations).
- Civilian employees of contractors performing jobs for the Luftwaffe
- Male personnel of the Civil Defense Security and Assistance Service, the Sicherheits- und Hilfsdienst, until the 1942 transfer to the Ordnungspolizei as the Luftschutzpolizei.
- Male personnel of the air raid warning service, the Luftschutzwarndienst.
- Female auxiliaries of the Luftwaffe, the Luftwaffenhelferinnen.
- Flakwehrmänner, that is male workers and salaried employees, either overage or in reserved occupations, who in addition to their regular work manned local anti-aircraft batteries (Heimatflak).
- Luftwaffenhelfer, 15–17-year-old male high school students and apprentices, who in addition to school or work manned Heimatflak-batteries.
- Staff and members of detachments from paramilitary organizations attached to the Luftwaffe, such as NSKK-Transportregiment Luftwaffe of the National Socialist Motor Corps, OT-Einsatz Luftwaffe of the Organisation Todt, and TENO-Einsatzgruppe Luftwaffe of the Technische Nothilfe.
- RAD-Kriegshilfsdienst – female members of the Reichsarbeitsdienst in extended war service, as far as it was fulfilled in attachment to the Luftwaffe.

== See also ==
- Organization of the Luftwaffe (1933–45)
- Ranks and insignia of the Luftwaffe (1935–45)
