= Corps colours of the Luftwaffe (1935–1945) =

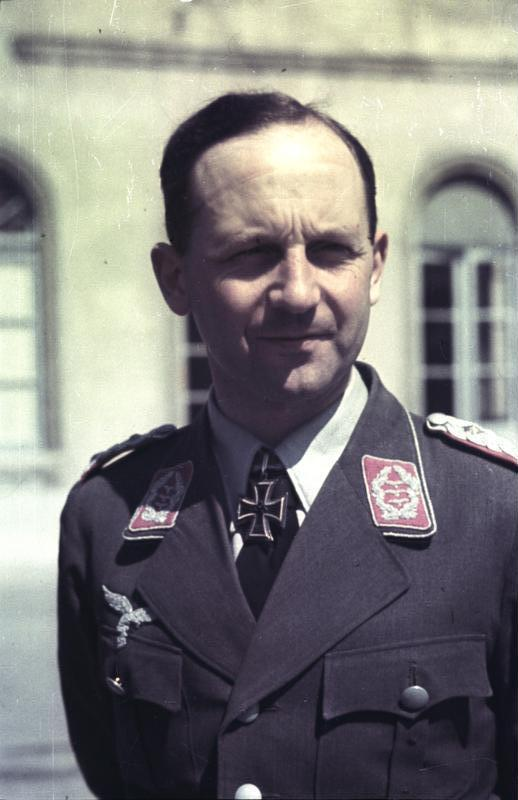
Luftwaffe colonel of the general staff, 1941/1942

Corps colours, or troop-function colours (ge: Waffenfarben) were worn in the German Luftwaffe from 1935 until 1945, in order to distinguish between several branches, special services, corps, rank groups, and appointments of the ministerial area, the general staff, and the Oberkommando der Wehrmacht (OKW). The corps colours were part of the uniform piping, gorget patches, shoulder straps, arabesque and lampasse ornaments of general and flag officers. They were also part of heraldic flags, colours, standards, and guidons.

In the Luftwaffe, there was a strictly defined system of corps colours for collar patches, piping, and coloured edging around the shoulder boards or straps. The chevrons on special clothes for Luftwaffe personnel, e.g. flight suits and jumpsuits, also showed corps colours.

== Colours and examples ==
The table below contains some corps colours and examples used by the Luftwaffe from 1935-45.

| Troops, unit, appointment | Corps colour | Example | Remark |
|---|---|---|---|
| Generalfeldmarschall; All general ranks from Generalmajor to Generaloberst | White (Weiß) | | Generaloberst |
| Generalfeldmarschall; All general ranks from Generalmajor to Generaloberst | White (Weiß) | | Lampasses (uniform trousers, breeches) |
| Division "Hermann Göring"; Artillery troops and air defence | White (close patch) | | Unterwachtmeister |
| Division "Hermann Göring"; Artillery troops and air defence | Deep-red (piping) | | Unterwachtmeister |
| Anti-aircraft troops; Air force artillery | Deep-red (Tiefrot) | | Feldwebel; Pennon Flak (anti-aircraft) battalion |
| Officers in general staff service (Generalstabsoffiziere) | Carmine (Karmesin) | | Oberst i.G. (colonel in general staff service) |
| Officers in general staff service (Generalstabsoffiziere) | Gold-yellow (Goldgelb) | Lampasses (uniform trousers, breeches) | |
| Military judicial service (Militärgerichtsbarkeit) | Purple (Purpur) | | Stabsrichter |
| Field chaplains | Purple (#C154C1) | | |
| Aviator engineer(ing) service (Fliegeringenieurdienst) | Pink (Rosa) | | From Generalleutnant (engineer) OF7 to Leutnant (engineer) OF1a |
| Aviator troops: pilots and ground personnel; Fallschirmjäger (parachute troops) | Gold-yellow (Goldgelb) | | Oberfeldwebel; Flying units, battalions |
| Radar units; Air traffic control | Bright-green (Hellgrün) | | Hauptgefreiter |
| Luftwaffe Field Divisions (prior to changing to white under Heer control in 1944) | Hunter-green (Jägergrün) | | Troops standard |
| Universally used by the Militärverwaltung of the Luftwaffe | Dark-green (#00703E) | | Main colour of the uniform gorget and collar patches' backgraund |
| Transport units (Transporteinheiten); Air force reserve (Luftwaffenreserve) | Light-blue (Hellblau) | | |
| Air force medical corps (Sanitätstruppe) | Blue (Blau) | | Stabsgefreiter |
| Air communications corps (Luftnachrichtentruppe) | Saddle brown (Braun) | | Major; Corps standard communications battalion |
| Construction engineer corps (Baupioniere); Air force engineer corps (Luftwaffen-Pioniere) | Black (Schwarz) | N/A | Stabsfeldwebel |

== Exceptions & special cases ==
Special regulations applied to corps colours of units, services, and special troops, attached permanently to the ground services of the Heer.

- Division "Hermann Göring": Kragenspiegel and shoulder strap piping (Schulterklappenvorstoß) "white", collar patches´ piping (Kragenspiegelvorstoß) in corps colours:
  - White (with black border line): infantry,
  - Scarlet: artillery and anti-aircraft defence (Flugabwehr)
  - Golden-brown: communications
  - Black: engineer
  - Rose-pink: armour, antitank (Panzerjäger) and armoured reconnaissance (Panzeraufklärer).
- Air Force divisions: Collar patch main colour: green piping to collar patches and shoulder straps in corps colours:
  - Yellow: cyclists (Radfahrer) and reconnaissance (Aufklärer),
  - Rose-pink: antitank troops (Panzerjäger)
  - Scarlet: artillery and anti aircraft defence (Flugabwehr)
  - Bright-blue: Supply (Nachschubtruppe) and Administration (Verwaltungstruppe)
  - Golden-brown: communications

== See also ==
- Corps colour
- Corps colours (Waffen-SS)
- Corps colours of the German Army (1935–1945)
- Ranks and insignia of the German Army (1935–1945)
- Ranks and insignia of the Luftwaffe (1935–1945)
