= Ranks and insignia of the Luftwaffe (1935–1945) =

The Luftwaffe, from its founding in 1933 to the end of World War II in 1945, used ranks similar to other air forces at the time; however, some Luftwaffe ranks had no equivalent in the Allied air forces. While many ranks might have equivalents in other air forces, in reality the Luftwaffe military had a far greater responsibility; while officers of the Royal Air Force, the British Air Force, were graded to a higher rank when performing higher rank functions, Luftwaffe officers maintained their rank while performing functions, regardless of size of the responsibility assigned to them.

== Luftwaffe ==
Insignia			Title	Approximate equivalents during World War II	
Collar	Shoulder	Sleeve (Flight suit)	Title	US	UK
Generalsränge
		—N/a	Reichsmarschall	—N/a	—N/a
			Generalfeldmarschall	General of the Army (Note: General of the Air Force introduced in 1949.)	Marshal of the Royal Air Force
			Generaloberst	General	Air chief marshal
			General der Waffengattung: General der Fallschirmtruppe; General der Flakartillerie; General der Flieger; General der Luftnachrichtentruppe; General der Luftwaffe	Lieutenant general	Air marshal
			Generalleutnant	Major general	Air vice-marshal
			Generalmajor	Brigadier general	Air commodore
Offiziersränge
			Oberst	Colonel	Group captain
			Oberstleutnant	Lieutenant colonel	Wing commander
			Major	Major	Squadron leader
			Hauptmann	Captain	Flight lieutenant
			Oberleutnant	First lieutenant	Flying officer
			Leutnant	Second lieutenant	Pilot officer
Unteroffiziere and Offizieranwärter (OA)
			Stabsfeldwebel-Fahnenjunker	N/A	
			Stabsfeldwebel	Master Sergeant	Warrant officer
			Fahnenjunker-Oberfeldwebel	Flight cadet	Acting pilot officer
			Oberfeldwebel	Master sergeant	—N/a
			Fahnenjunker-Feldwebel	N/A	
			Feldwebel	Technical sergeant	Flight sergeant
			Fahnenjunker-Unterfeldwebel	Flight cadet	Officer cadet
			Unterfeldwebel	Staff sergeant	Sergeant
			Fahnenjunker-Unteroffizier	Flight cadet	Officer cadet
			Unteroffizier	Sergeant	Corporal
Mannschaften
			Stabsgefreiter	Corporal	Leading aircraftman
			Hauptgefreiter (used until 1944)	Corporal	Leading aircraftman
			Obergefreiter	Private first class	Leading aircraftman
			Gefreiter	Private	Leading aircraftman
		—N/a	Flieger	Private	Aircraftman 2nd class

== Condor Legion ==
Insignia		German Rank	Spanish equivalent
Chest	Cuff	German Rank	Spanish equivalent
—N/a		Generalleutnant	General de división
—N/a		Generalmajor	General de brigada
—N/a		Oberst	Coronel
	—N/a	Oberstleutnant	Coronel
	—N/a	Major	Teniente coronel
	—N/a	Hauptmann	Comandante
	—N/a	Oberleutnant	Capitán
	—N/a	Leutnant	Teniente
	—N/a	Feldwebel, Oberfeldwebel, Stabsfeldwebel	Alférez
	—N/a	Unteroffizier, Unterfeldwebel	Sargento
	—N/a	Legionär	Cabo

== See also ==
- World War II German Army ranks and insignia
- Corps colours of the Luftwaffe (1935–45)
- Luftwaffe personnel structure
