= Olenius =

Olenius is a surname. Notable people with the surname include:

- Elsa Olenius (1896–1984), Swedish librarian and author
- Oiva Olenius (1890–1968), Finnish general
- Valto Olenius (1920–1983), Finnish pole vaulter
