= Sakari Simelius =

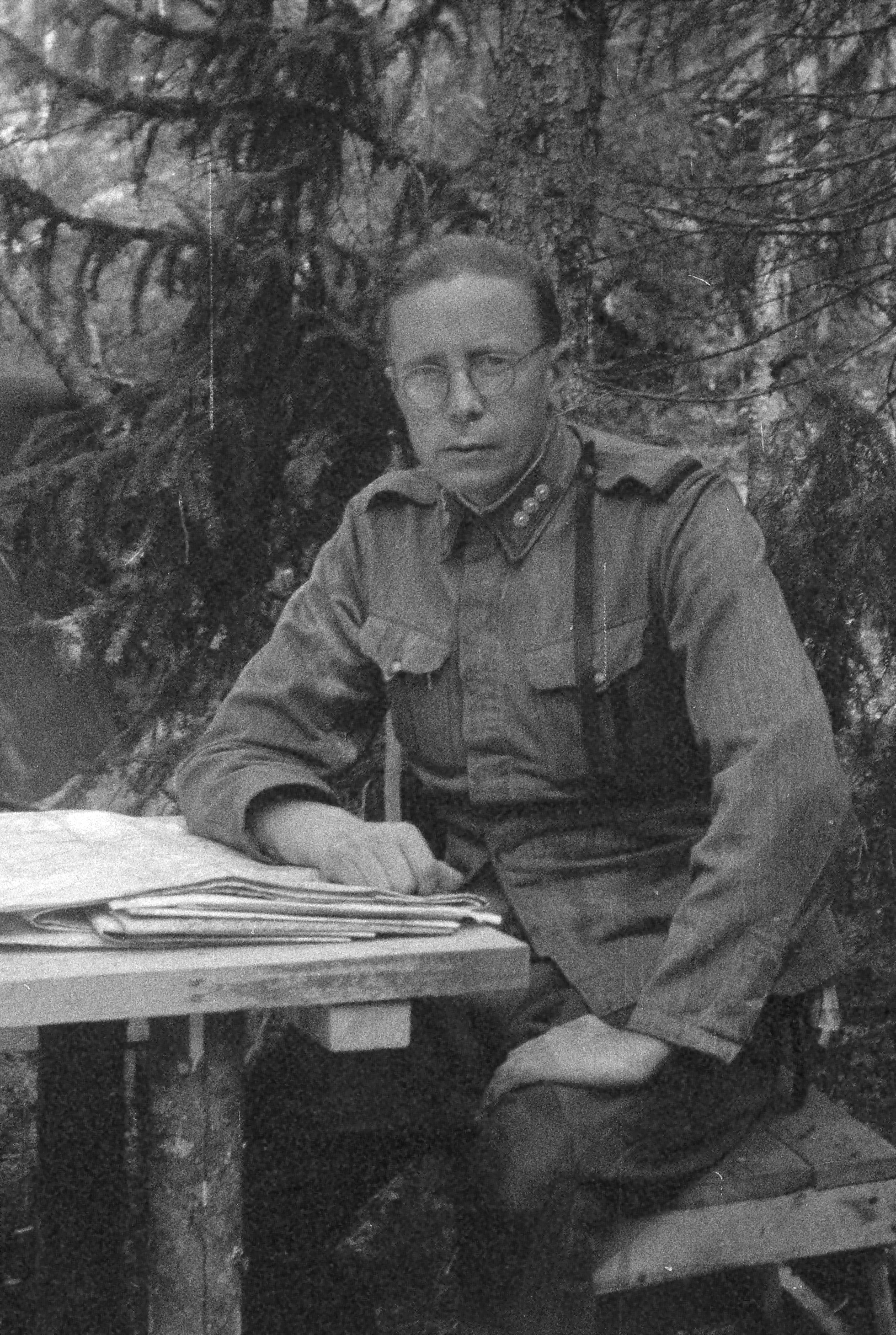
Sakari Simelius in 1944

Jaakko Sakari Simelius (13 November 1900, Kuopio – 18 May 1985, Helsinki) was a Finnish General of the Infantry. He was the Chief of Defence of the Finnish Defence Forces between 1959 and 1965.

Military offices
Preceded by General Kaarlo Heiskanen	Chief of Defence; 1959–1965	Succeeded by General Yrjö Keinonen
