= General der Pioniere =

WW2 German Army branch general rank

General of the Engineers General der Pioniere
- Arabesque and flecktarn suit insignia

- Army shoulder board
- Country: Nazi Germany
- Service branch: German Army
- Rank: Three-star
- NATO rank code: OF-8
- Non-NATO rank: O-9
- Next higher rank: Generaloberst
- Next lower rank: Generalleutnant
- Equivalent ranks: See list

General der Pioniere (en: General of the engineers) was a General of the branch rank of the German Army in Nazi Germany. Until the end of World War II in 1945, this particular general officer rank was on three-star level (OF-8), equivalent to a US Lieutenant general. The rank was introduced in 1938.

The General of the branch ranks of the Heer were in 1945:

- General of artillery
- General of mountain troops
- General of infantry
- General of cavalry
- General of the communications troops
- General of panzer troops (armoured troops)
- General der Pioniere / General of the engineers
- General of the medical corps
- General of the veterinary corps

| junior Rank; Generalleutnant | (German officer rank); General der Pioniere | senior Rank; Generaloberst |

The rank was equivalent to the General of the branch ranks of the Deutsche Luftwaffe (en: German Air Force):

Luftwaffe

- General of parachute troops
- General of the anti-aircraft artillery
- General of the aviators
- General of air force communications troops
- General of the air force

Other services

The rank was also equivalent to the German three-star ranks:

- Admiral of the Kriegsmarine, equivalent to (US Vice admiral) and
- SS-Obergruppenführer und General der Waffen-SS in the Waffen-SS.

== List of officers who were General der Pioniere ==
- Otto-Wilhelm Förster (1885–1966)
- Erwin Jaenecke (1890–1960)
- Alfred Jacob (1883–1963)
- Walter Kuntze (1883–1960)
- Karl Sachs (1886–1952/53) (died in Soviet gulag)
- Otto Tiemann (1890–1952)

== See also ==
- General (Germany)
- Comparative officer ranks of World War II
