= General of the branch =

Rank in some armies

A general of the branch, general of the branch of service or general of the ... (where instead of the ellipsis an appropriate name of the military branch is being put) is a three or four-star general officer rank in some armies. Several nations divide—or used to divide—their senior general officer ranks by the branch of troops they are qualified to command, or simply as an honorific title.

== Austria-Hungary ==
Collar insignia of an Austro-Hungarian "general of the branch"

In the Austro-Hungarian Army there were three general of the branch ranks:

- General der Infanterie (en: General of the Infantry)
- General der Kavallerie (en: General of the Cavalry)
- Feldzeugmeister (en: General of the Artillery)

The rank of General der Infanterie was introduced in 1908, prior to this both infantrymen and gunners were appointed as Feldzeugmeisters.

Historically, the rank of general of artillery (German: Feldzeugmeister; literally "battlefield ordnance master"; "gun master"; (Note: The term is German. Feld- means battlefield, as used in the German Feldmarschall ("field marshal"), and -zeug- refers to the guns used by the artillery) in Hungarian Táborszernagy) was equivalent to lieutenant general. In French, the equivalent expression was grand maitre d'artillerie, used since the time of Philip VI of France. The English position of Master-General of the Ordnance was similarly derived.

== Bulgaria ==
The Third Bulgarian State from its inception in 1878 had a highest military rank of "general" (Bulgarian: генерал), but in 1897 this rank was split into three grades: general of infantry (генерал от пехотата), of cavalry (генерал от кавалерията) and of artillery (генерал от артилерията). The rank was replaced after World War II, when Bulgaria fell into the Soviet sphere of influence, with the all-encompassing rank of general.

== Finland ==
Generic General's collar insignia without service branch colour

Full generals (4 star; NATO OF-9) in the Finnish military were classified as generals of the branch. These were the generals of the infantry (Jalkaväenkenraali), of the cavalry (Ratsuväenkenraali), of the jaegers (Jääkärikenraali) and of the artillery (Tykistönkenraali). The title is now merely honorific, and only one 4-star general is active at any one time in the modern Finnish military.

=== General of the Infantry ===
- Adolf Ehrnrooth
- Erik Heinrichs
- Kaarlo Heiskanen
- Yrjö Ilmari Keinonen
- Taavetti Laatikainen
- Armas-Eino Martola
- Oiva Olenius
- Aarne Sihvo
- Sakari Simelius
- Paavo Talvela
- Kustaa Tapola
- Rudolf Walden
- Martin Wetzer
- Karl Fredrik Wilkama

=== General of the Cavalry ===
- C.G.E. Mannerheim, later Marshal of Finland
- Ernst Linder

=== General of the Artillery ===
- Vilho Nenonen

== Germany ==
=== German armies and air forces until 1945 ===
Historical ranks (ascending):

- Generalmajor
- Generalleutnant
- General der Waffengattung
- Generaloberst
- Generalfeldmarschall

=== Wehrmacht ===
General of the branch (shoulder insignia and gorget patches)
General of the branch (shoulder insignia and gorget patches)	Heer	Luftwaffe	Waffen-SS

In the German Wehrmacht a General of a branch (German: General der Waffengattung) was linked to service arms of the Heer (army) and Luftwaffe (air force), depending on where the officer served and what troops he (nominally) commanded. It was equivalent to the three-star ranks of admiral in the Nazi Kriegsmarine, and SS-Obergruppenführer und General der Waffen-SS in the Waffen-SS. A commander-in-chief (Kommandierender General or Befehlshaber) of a German army corps was usually of this rank. In our time this rank might be comparable to NATO OF-8.

Heer

- General of the artillery (German: General der Artillerie)
- General of the mountain troops (General der Gebirgstruppe)
- General of the Infantry (General der Infanterie)
- General of the cavalry (General der Kavallerie)
- General of the communications troops (General der Nachrichtentruppe)
- General of the panzer troops (General der Panzertruppe)
- General of the engineers (General der Pioniere)
- General of the medical corps (Generaloberstabsarzt)
- General of the veterinary corps (Generaloberstabveterinär)

Sequence of ranks ascending

junior rank: Generalleutnant	(German officer rank); General of the Branch	senior rank: Generaloberst

Luftwaffe

- General of the parachute corps (General der Fallschirmtruppe)
- General of the anti-aircraft artillery (General der Flakartillerie)
- General of the aviators (General der Flieger)
- General of the air force communications corps (General der Luftnachrichtentruppe)
- General of the air force (General der Luftwaffe)

Waffen-SS

- SS-Obergruppenführer and general of the Waffen-SS (SS-Obergruppenführer und General der Waffen-SS)

=== Bundeswehr ===
When the contemporary German Army, the Bundeswehr, was founded (on November the 12th, 1955) some of the names for general ranks were replaced with the current ones.

The denomination General der Panzertruppen, General der Infanterie, General der Artillerie and General der Fernmeldetruppe are still around, but they are not longer ranks but positions. These positions seem to roughly correspond to the pre-Bundeswehr Inspekteur der .... For example Heinz Guderian had the position of Inspekteur der Panzertruppen for a while.

== Poland ==
Sleeve insignia of a Polish generał broni

In the Polish armed forces the rank equivalent to lieutenant general is generał broni ("general of a branch"). (Note: Polish broń means both "weapons, firearms" and "branch of troops"; in this context the meaning is clearly "general of a branch of troops", not "general of weapons")

== Russian Empire ==
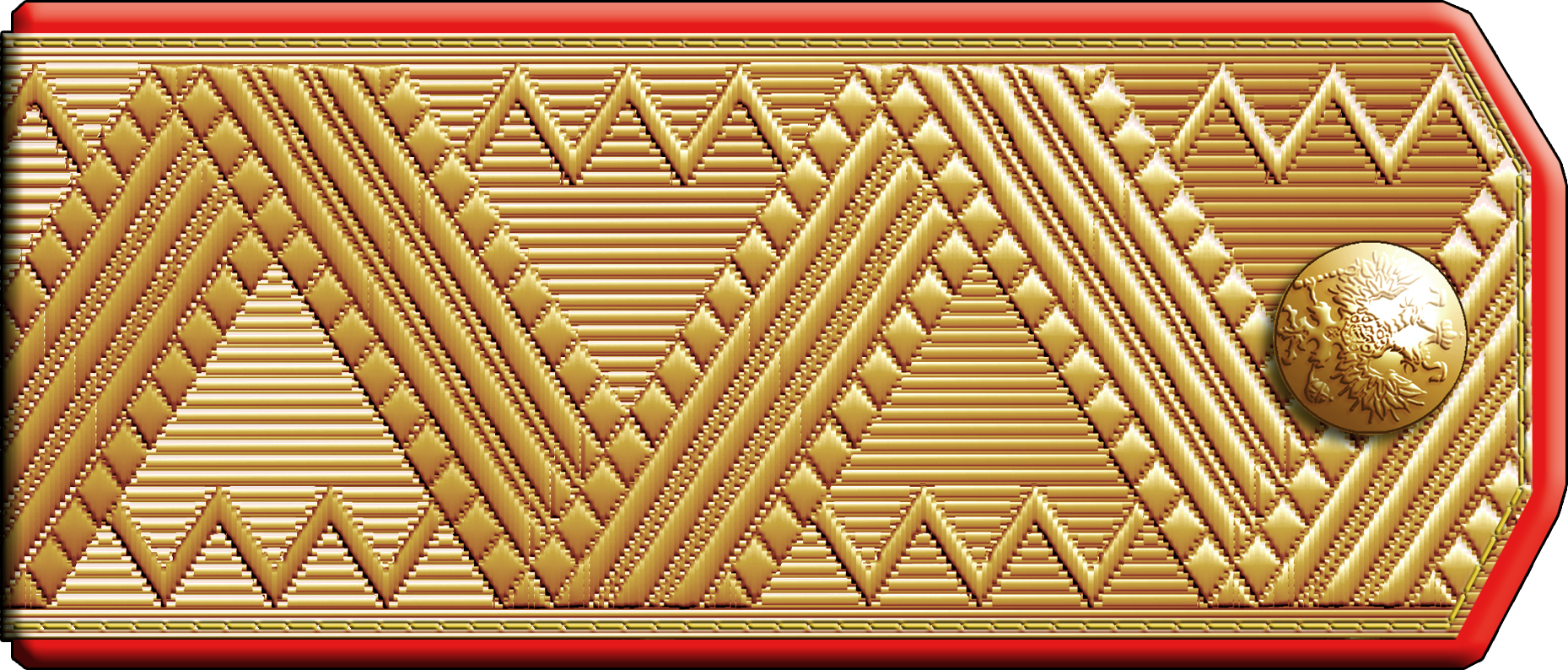
"General of the branch", Imperial Russian Army

General of the Branch is known in Russian as General roda Voysk. Peter the Great created the ranks of general of infantry and general of cavalry in the Imperial Russian Army in early 1700s, though for much of the 18th century a single rank of general-en-chef was used instead. It was Class 2 in the Table of Ranks.

== See also ==
- Comparative military ranks of World War I
- Comparative officer ranks of World War II
