= General der Fallschirmtruppe =

WW2-era branch general rank in the German Luftwaffe

General of the Parachute Corps General der Fallschirmtruppe
- Collar patch and flying suit insignia

- Luftwaffe shoulder board
- Country: Nazi Germany
- Service branch: Luftwaffe
- Rank: Three-star
- NATO rank code: OF-8
- Non-NATO rank: O-9
- Next higher rank: Generaloberst
- Next lower rank: Generalleutnant
- Equivalent ranks: See list

General der Fallschirmtruppe (en: general of the parachute corps) was a general of the branch rank of the Deutsche Luftwaffe (en: German Air Force) in Nazi Germany. Until the end of World War II in 1945, this particular general officer rank was on three-star level (OF-8), equivalent to a US lieutenant general.

The "general of the branch" ranks of the Luftwaffe were in 1945:

- General of parachute troops
- General of anti-aircraft artillery
- General of the aviators
- General of air force communications troops
- General of the air force

The rank was equivalent to the general of the branch ranks of the Heer (army) as follows:

Heer

- General of artillery
- General of mountain troops
- General of infantry
- General of cavalry
- General of the communications troops
- General of panzer troops (armoured troops)
- General of engineers
- General of the medical corps
- General of the veterinary corps

junior Rank; Generalleutnant	(German officer rank); General der Fallschirmtruppe	senior Rank; Generaloberst

Other services

The rank was also equivalent to the German three-star ranks:

- Admiral of the Kriegsmarine, equivalent to (US vice admiral) and
- SS-Obergruppenführer und General der Waffen-SS in the Waffen-SS.

== List of officers who were General der Fallschirmtruppe ==
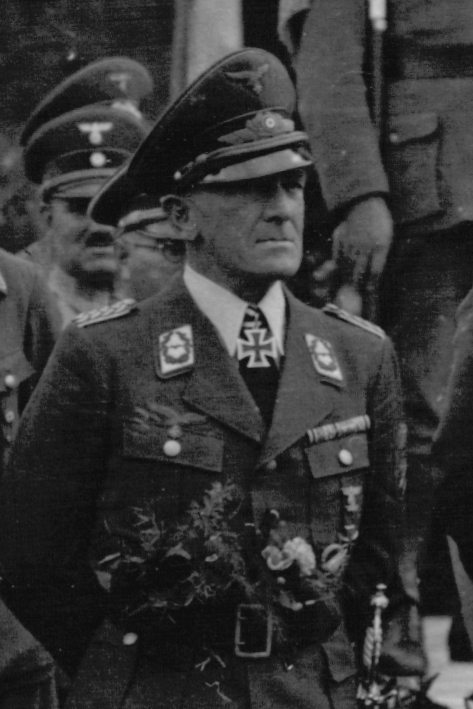
Eugen Meindl 1941

- Bruno Bräuer
- Paul Conrath
- Richard Heidrich
- Eugen Meindl
- Hermann-Bernhard Ramcke
- Alfred Schlemm
- Kurt Student

== See also ==
- General (Germany)
- Comparative officer ranks of World War II
