= General der Luftwaffe =

General officer rank in the Luftwaffe branch of the German Wehrmacht

General of the Air Force General der Luftwaffe
- Collar patch and flying suit insignia

- Luftwaffe shoulder board
- Country: Nazi Germany
- Service branch: Luftwaffe
- Rank: Three-star
- NATO rank code: OF-8
- Non-NATO rank: O-9
- Next higher rank: Generaloberst
- Next lower rank: Generalleutnant
- Equivalent ranks: See list

General der Luftwaffe (English: General of the air force) was a General of the branch rank of the Deutsche Luftwaffe (English: German Air Force) in Nazi Germany. Until the end of World War II in 1945, this particular general officer rank was on three-star level (OF-8), equivalent to a US Lieutenant general.

The "General of the branch" ranks of the Luftwaffe were in 1945:

- General of parachute troops
- General of anti-aircraft artillery
- General of the aviators
- General of air force communications troops
- General of the air force

The rank was equivalent to the General of the branch ranks of the Heer (army) as follows:

Heer

- General of artillery
- General of mountain troops
- General of infantry
- General of cavalry
- General of the communications troops
- General of panzer troops (armoured troops)
- General of engineers
- General of the medical corps
- General of the veterinary corps

| junior Rank; Generalleutnant | (German officer rank); General der Luftwaffe | senior Rank; Generaloberst |

Other services

The rank was also equivalent to the German three-star ranks:

- Admiral of the Kriegsmarine, equivalent to (US Vice admiral) and
- SS-Obergruppenführer und General der Waffen-SS in the Waffen-SS.

== Officers in this rank ==
| Name | Dates of life | Promotion | Remark |
|---|---|---|---|
| Wilhelm Schubert | 1879–1972 | July 1, 1942 | Expert of war economy and armament |
| Walther Wecke | 1885–1943 | December 1, 1942 | First commanding officer of the Hermann Görings police Stabswache |

== See also ==
- General of the branch
- Military ranks of the Luftwaffe (1935–45)

== Literature ==
- Reinhard Stumpf: Die Wehrmacht-Elite - Rang und Herkunftsstruktur der deutschen Generale und Admirale 1933–1945, Harald Boldt Verlag, Boppard/Rhein 1982. ISBN 3-7646-1815-9
- Karl Friedrich Hildebrandt: Die Generale der Luftwaffe 1935–1945 (3 Bde.), Biblio-Verlag, Osnabrück 1991. ISBN 376481701-1
