= Yrjö Keinonen =

Finnish general and Chief of Defence of Finland (1912–1977)

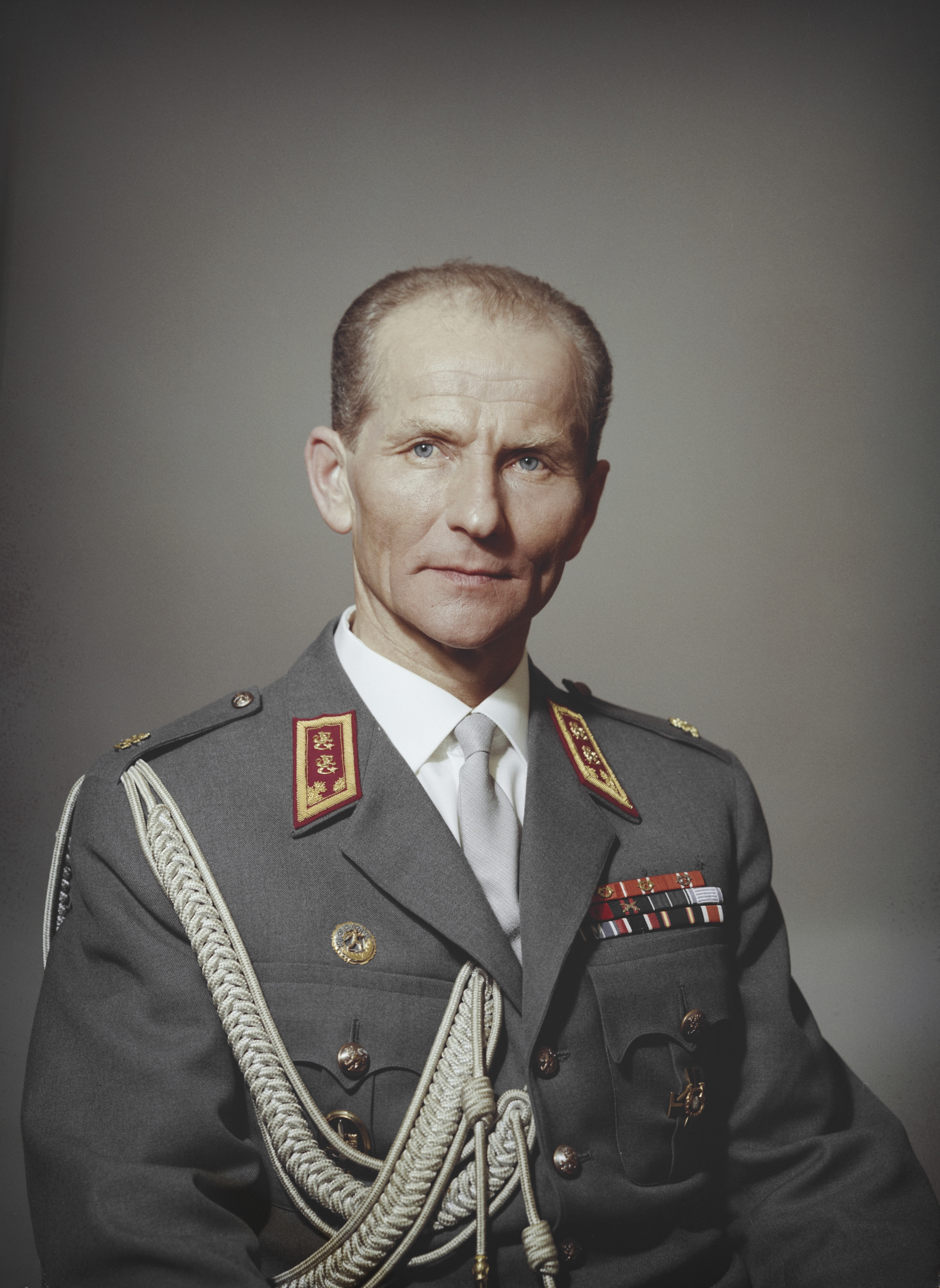
Yrjö Keinonen

Yrjö Ilmari Keinonen (31 August 1912 – 29 October 1977) was a Finnish General of the Infantry and Knight of the Mannerheim Cross. He was born in Ruskeala. Keinonen was the Chief of Defence of the Finnish Defence Forces between 1965 and 1969.

In 1945, Keinonen was arrested for his involvement in the Weapons Cache Case. He was later sentenced to 14 months in prison.

General Keinonen was the only Chief of Defence to be forced to resign in-term. When he was selected for the position, his formal qualifications were excellent, and he was unambiguously supported by President Kekkonen. A contemporary, Lieutenant Colonel Tiilikainen, devotes an entire chapter to the reasons why he resigned in his book about the Cold War in Finland. Officially, the explanation was neglect of duties, working only an estimated 90 days annually. However, there was widespread resentment against him, both in the forces and later revealed in other memoirs from other generals. This hints towards a more serious accusation, defeatism. Namely, Tiilikainen speculates that due to the Finno-Soviet Treaty of 1948, Keinonen believed that a Soviet occupation was eventually inevitable. Thus, the remaining task of the Chief of Defence was to be some sort of a Finnish General Philippe Pétain, doing only damage control, and thus active defence planning was unnecessary. He died in Nurmijärvi.

Military offices
Preceded by General Sakari Simelius	Chief of Defence; 1965–1969	Succeeded by General Kaarlo Leinonen
