= Oiva (restaurant) =

Restaurant in Helsinki, Finland

Coordinates: 60.181966°N 24.951452°E

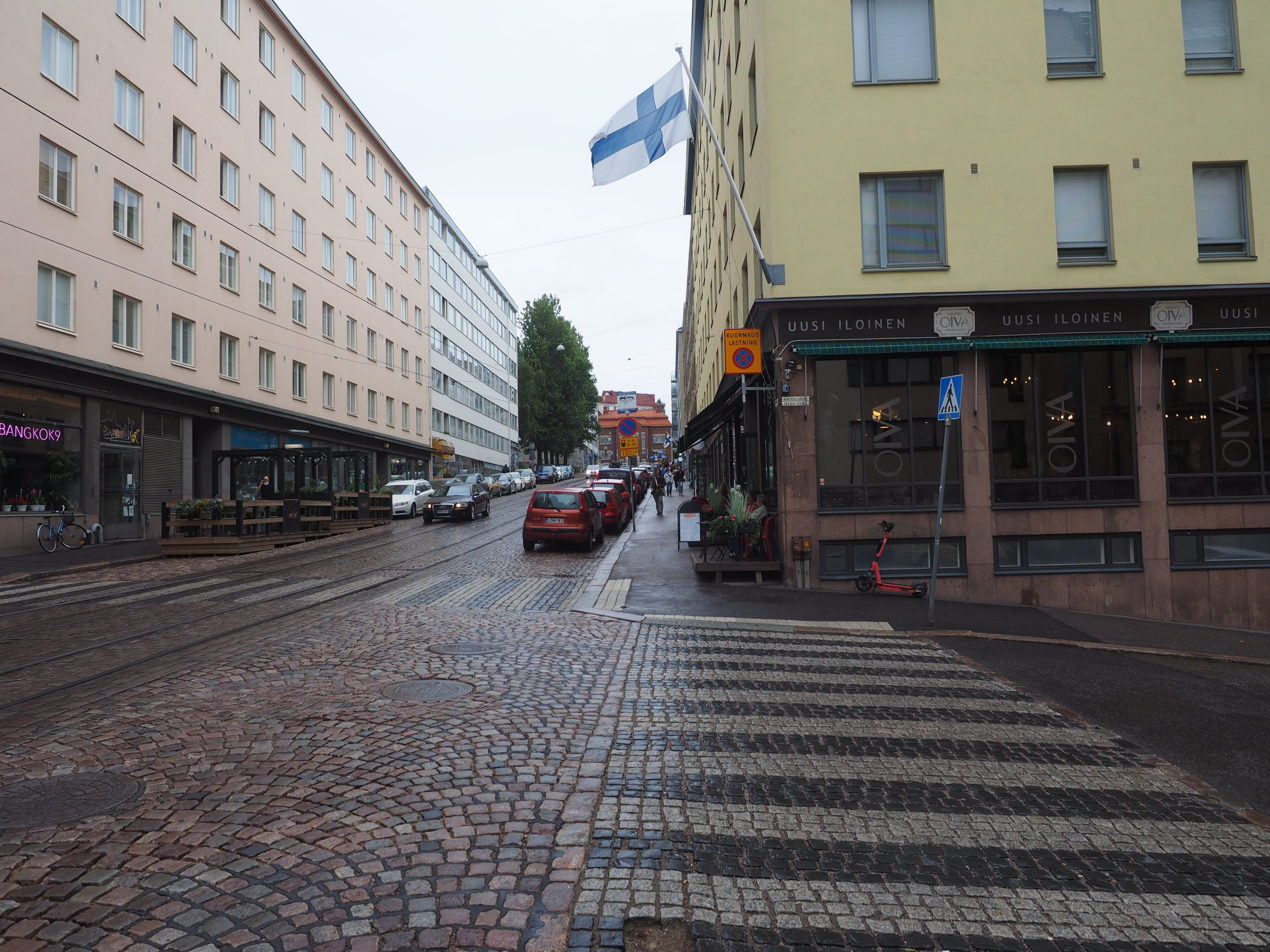
Restaurant Oiva (on the right) in the corner of the streets Porthaninkatu and Kolmas linja in summer 2023.

Oiva (known in the 1960s and 1970s as Bistro and in the 1980s as Kallion Oiva Bistro) is a restaurant in Kallio, Helsinki, Finland opened in the 1930s. It moved into its current premises at Porthaninkatu 5 in the corner of Kolmas linja in 1941 when the building was finished. The restaurant has become famous in Finland because of the song "Kolmatta linjaa takaisin" ("Back along Kolmas linja") written by Juha Vainio, containing the lyric "Saa Oivan portsari lantin, jonka velkaa jäin..." ("I'll give the doorman at Oiva the coin which I owed him...").

== History ==
The restaurant Oiva was originally founded by J.A. Koivulaakso northwards of its current location, in a wooden house between Kolmas linja and Neljäs linja. When the new building was completed in 1941, the restaurant moved into new premises on the ground floor of the building designed specifically as a restaurant.

J.A. Koivulaakso died in 1955, and his widow sold the restaurant to the Ruotsalainen couple who had worked there.

The third owners of Oiva were the Lempi and Heikki Hildén who had successfully run bakeries and bought the restaurant in the middle 1960s and renamed it as Bistro in a French style in 1967. The restaurant became famous for its meat dish buffet run by the restaurateur Hjördis Sundvall. On Wednesday and Saturday evenings Bistro served as a dance restaurant, mostly featuring the Asser Fagerström trio. In August 1971 the restaurant expanded into the premises of the adjacent butchers' shop which was converted into a bar. The Hildéns started expanding their restaurant chain so that in 1974 it also included Bankett Hildén and Pam-Pam in Kluuvi, Riemukaari (previously known as Falerno) in Punavuori and Piratti in Lauttasaari. After Heikki Hildén died, Lempi Hildén sold five of her restaurants to the Go-Inn company owned by Fazer and Nestlé. In 1977 Go-Inn renovated Oiva from a table service restaurant to a self-service restaurant focusing on an open kitchen, lunch and pizza. In 1982 the company Kantaravintolat bought the restaurants Bistro, Pam-Pam and Happy Days in the Esplanadi park from Go-Inn, and restaurant Bistro was renamed as Kallion Oiva Bistro.

The restaurant was successful throughout the 1980s until it was hit by the early 1990s depression in Finland. In 2006 the restaurant was renamed back to Oiva, and in 2011 it was bought by its restaurateur Johanna Rönkkö and her spouse.

== Oiva today ==
Today Oiva serves as a lunch restaurant on weekdays and as a pub-style restaurant on evenings. The restaurant serves food on evenings from Tuesday to Saturday. There is often entertainment on evenings, such as karaoke, open stage evenings and bingo.

Because of its lunch buffet, the restaurant was voted the best buffet restaurant in Helsinki in a survey by the newspaper Helsingin Uutiset in 2024. It received 309 votes from a total of 1618. It had previously been twice awarded as the best brunch restaurant in Helsinki.
