= Luftwaffe construction units =

- Luftwaffen-Bautruppen
- Active: 1939-1944
- Country: Nazi Germany
- Allegiance: Luftwaffe
- Type: Construction
- Role: Air base construction
- Size: 150,000 soldiers, Hiwis, POWs
- Garrison/HQ: Lw. Inspektion 17, OKL

Luftwaffe pioneers
- Luftwaffen-Pioniere
- Active: 1944-1945
- Country: Nazi Germany
- Allegiance: Luftwaffe
- Type: Military engineering
- Role: Air base construction and destruction
- Size: 10,000 soldiers
- Garrison/HQ: Lw. Inspektion 17, OKL

Luftwaffe construction units were established in 1939 from Reichsarbeitsdienst units transferred to the Luftwaffe, and reinforced with technically competent older conscripts, later also with prisoners of war and foreign volunteers (Hiwis). The main task was the construction and maintenance of military air bases. In 1944 the bulk of the construction units were transferred to the Organization Todt; those remaining under Luftwaffe control becoming Luftwaffe pioneers.

== History ==
During the buildup of the Luftwaffe, necessary construction work was conducted by private contractors with civilian staff. From 1938 units from the Reichsarbeitsdienst were increasingly used by the Luftwaffe for construction purposes. These RAD-units were from 1939 converted into Luftwaffe construction companies and battalions. From 1941 construction regiments, and sometimes construction brigades, were created. Construction units under RAD control still existed; in 1942, 56 companies served with the Luftwaffe in the West. In 1944 most of the construction units were transferred to the Organisation Todt; the construction troops remaining under Luftwaffe control were reorganized into 14 battalions as Lufwaffen-Pioniere.

== Mission ==
The role of the construction and pioneer units consisted of the implementation of all kind of construction projects, principally air base construction, and especially runway construction and repair. The pioneers were also tasked with the destruction of Luftwaffe installations, as the fronts contracted. Construction and pioneer units were also used to combat partisans, and as first-line troops in emergencies.

== Personnel ==
The personnel of the construction units came from the Reichsarbeitsdienst, and from older, technically trained, conscripts. The manual labor were increasingly performed by prisoners of war and by Hiwis.

== Organization ==
The Luftwaffe construction units were immediately subordinated to the air base regional commands, the Koflug, their use directed by its Field Works Office (Feldbauamt), and at the local air base by its Works Superintendent's Office (Bauleitung), composed of technical military officials. On the Luftgau level, a special staff officer (Stobau), later commander, of the construction units were in charge. In the Reichsluftfahrtministerium an inspector of construction units supervised the technical and military training, and the appropriate use, of the construction units and the pioneers.
