= Oiva Turunen =

Finnish businessman and politician (1910–1991)

Oiva Antero Turunen (19 November 1910 – 23 September 1991) was a Finnish business executive and politician, born in Ilomantsi. He was a member of the Parliament of Finland from 1948 to 1951 and from 1962 to 1966, representing the National Coalition Party. He was a presidential elector in the 1950 and 1956 presidential elections.
