= Oiva Olenius =

Finnish military leader (1890–1968)

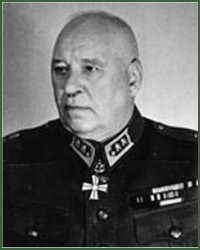
- Born: 16 September 1890; Helsinki, Grand Duchy of Finland, Russian Empire
- Died: 23 August 1968 (aged 77); Helsinki, Finland
- Military career
- Allegiance: German Empire (1915–1918); Finland (1918–1945)
- Branch: Imperial German Army; Finnish Jaeger troops; Finnish Army
- Service years: 1915–1945
- Rank: General of the Infantry (Finland)
- Conflicts: World War I; Eastern Front; Riga offensive (1917); Finnish Civil War; Battle of Viipuri; Winter War; Continuation War

Oiva Oskar Olenius (16 September 1890 – 23 August 1968) was a Finnish member of the Jäger movement and a general of the infantry.

== Biography ==
Olenius graduated from secondary school in 1909, and went on to study at the faculty of history and languages of the University of Helsinki. Later he worked as an accountant and office assistant from 1909 to 1912. In 1915, he volunteered to join the 27th Jaeger Battalion. He took part in battles on the German Eastern Front in World War I such as Riga offensive. On 31 July 1917, he was sent to Finland as the battalion's representative to contact domestic activist organizations and political leaders. On the same trip, he also arranged the transport of weapons from Umeå to Finland. He returned to the battalion on 18 November 1917.

He entered service in the Finnish Army on 11 February 1918 with the rank of lieutenant, and arrived in Vaasa on 25 February 1918 with the main body of Jaegers. He was assigned to the Finnish White Army, initially as a platoon leader and later as a company commander in the machine gun company of the 9th Jaeger Battalion of the 4th Jaeger Regiment, and took part in the battle of Viipuri.

Olenius served as the chief of staff of the Ministry of Defence from the Winter War until 1955, when he resigned from permanent service.

== Honours ==
- Republic of Finland:
  - Order of the Cross of Liberty, 1st Class with star
  - Commander 1st Class of the Order of the White Rose
- Kingdom of Sweden: Commander of the Order of the Sword
- Republic of Estonia: Order of the Cross of the Eagle, 2nd Class
