= Ranks and insignia of the German Army (1935–1945) =

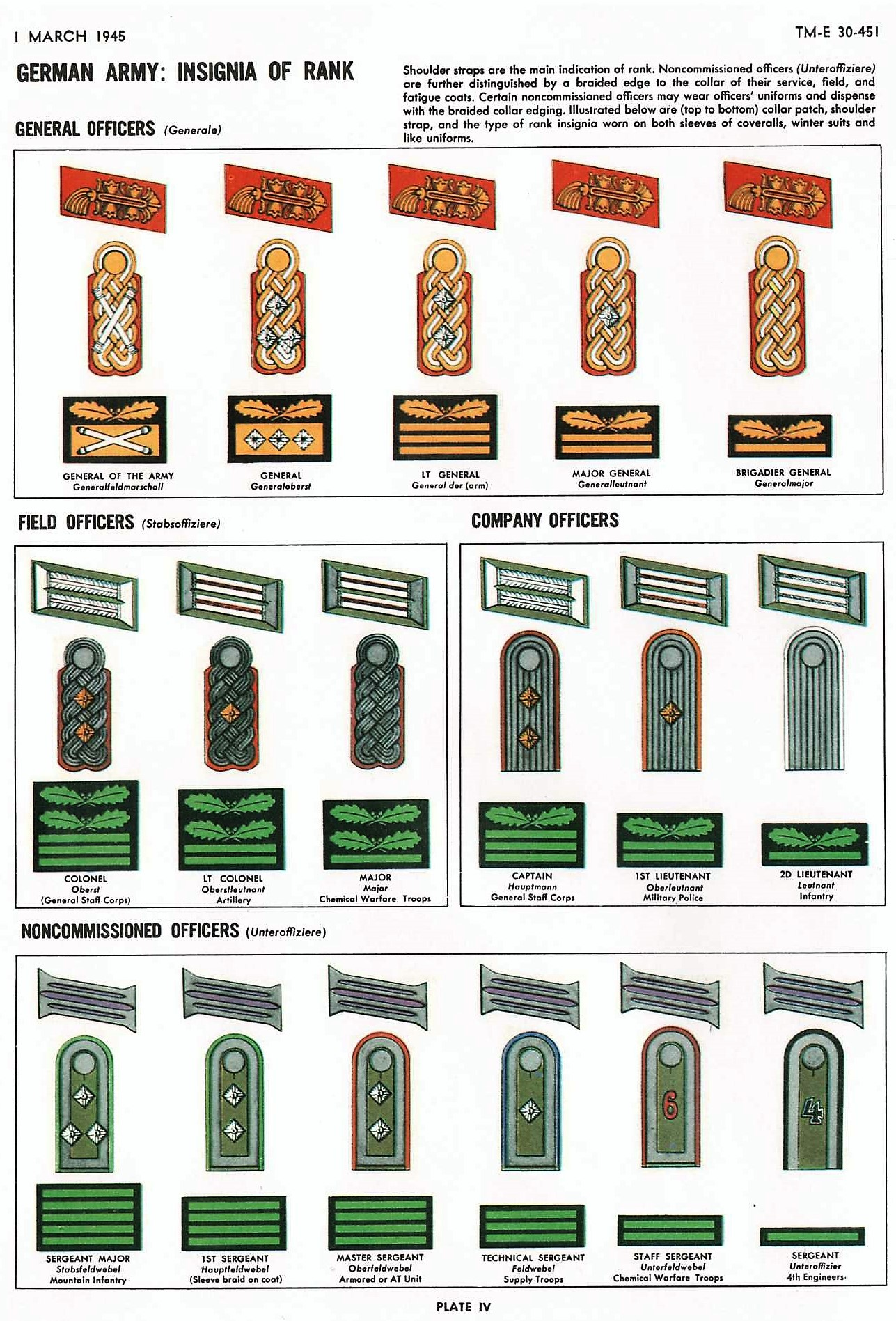
Army rank insignia

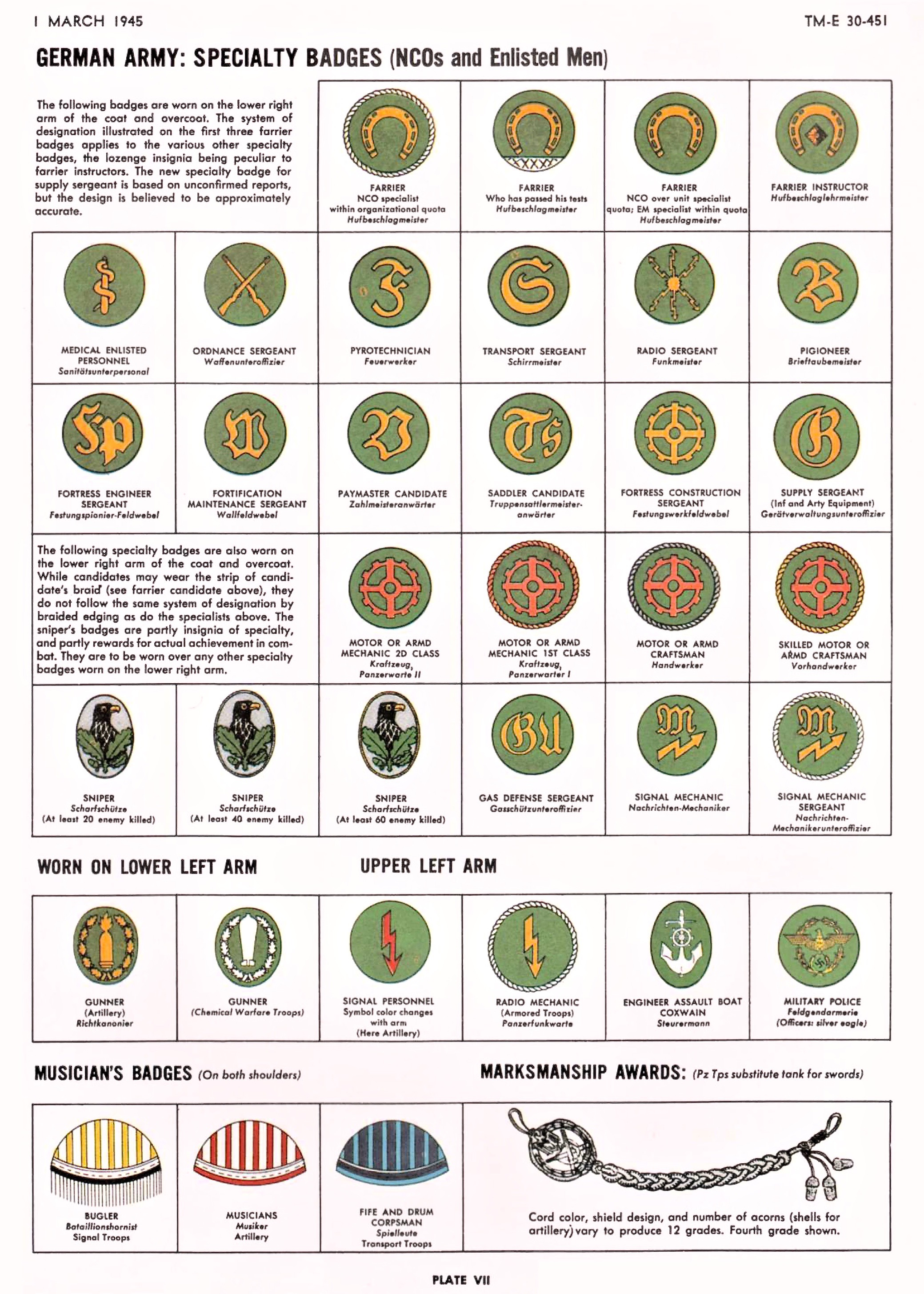
Specialty insignia (NCOs and enlisted)

The Heer as the German army and part of the Wehrmacht inherited its uniforms and rank structure from the Reichsheer of the Weimar Republic (1921–1935). There were few alterations and adjustments made as the army grew from a limited peacetime defense force of 100,000 men to a war-fighting force of several million men.

These ranks and insignia were specific to the Heer and in special cases to senior Wehrmacht officers in the independent services; the uniforms and rank systems of the other branches of the Wehrmacht, the Luftwaffe (Air Force) and Kriegsmarine (Navy), were different, as were those of the SS which was a Nazi Party organization outside the Wehrmacht. The Party also had its own series of paramilitary uniforms and insignia.

== Insignia ==
=== National Emblem: Hoheitszeichen or Wehrmachtsadler ===
The Reichswehr's visual acknowledgement of the new National Socialist reality came on 17 February 1934, when the Commander-in-Chief, Werner von Blomberg, ordered the Nazi Party eagle-and-swastika, then Germany's National Emblem, to be worn on uniform blouses and headgear effective 1 May. The design adopted, in silver for the Reichsheer (army) and in gold for the Reichsmarine (navy), was a stylized eagle with outstretched, beveled wings clutching a wreathed mobile swastika, later to be called the Wehrmachtsadler ("armed forces eagle"). (Note: The Luftwaffe, although a branch of the Wehrmacht, would use its own eagle design.)

==== Breast eagle ====
Wehrmachtsadler

1935

1939

1940

1944

Tropical

On tunics this took the form of a cloth patch about 9 cm (3.5 in) wide worn on the right breast, above the pocket. For enlisted uniforms it was jacquard-woven ("BeVo") or sometimes machine-embroidered in silver-grey rayon, for officers machine- or hand-embroidered in white silk or bright aluminum wire, and for generals hand-embroidered in gold bullion. (Note: "Gold bullion" in this context does not (usually) refer to actual gold, but to gold-colored wire, typically a bronze alloy) The backing was "badge-cloth" (Abzeichentuch), a close-woven velvetish fabric; this was originally Reichsheer grey, but in late 1935 the renamed Wehrmacht Heer changed its Abzeichentuch color to a dark blue-green called flaschengrün (bottle-green).

The war brought several variations to the breast eagle, although it should be kept in mind that none of them was replaced or de-authorized, and all were being worn side by side at war's end. When hostilities began in 1939, on the enlisted Feldbluse or field blouse the eagle was changed from silver-white to matte grey for reduced visibility; and in 1940 backings began to be produced in field-grey (feldgrau). Another version appeared with the advent of the Model 1944 Field Blouse, which used a triangular backing for speed and simplicity of manufacture. Very late in the war some Hoheitszeichen were simply printed on thin fabric.

There were also versions for other uniforms: both white and grey variants on black for the Panzer uniform, and in dull grey-blue on tan backing for the tropical (Afrikakorps) uniform. A stamped metal pin-on breast eagle was worn with the officers' white summer tunic.

==== Headgear ====
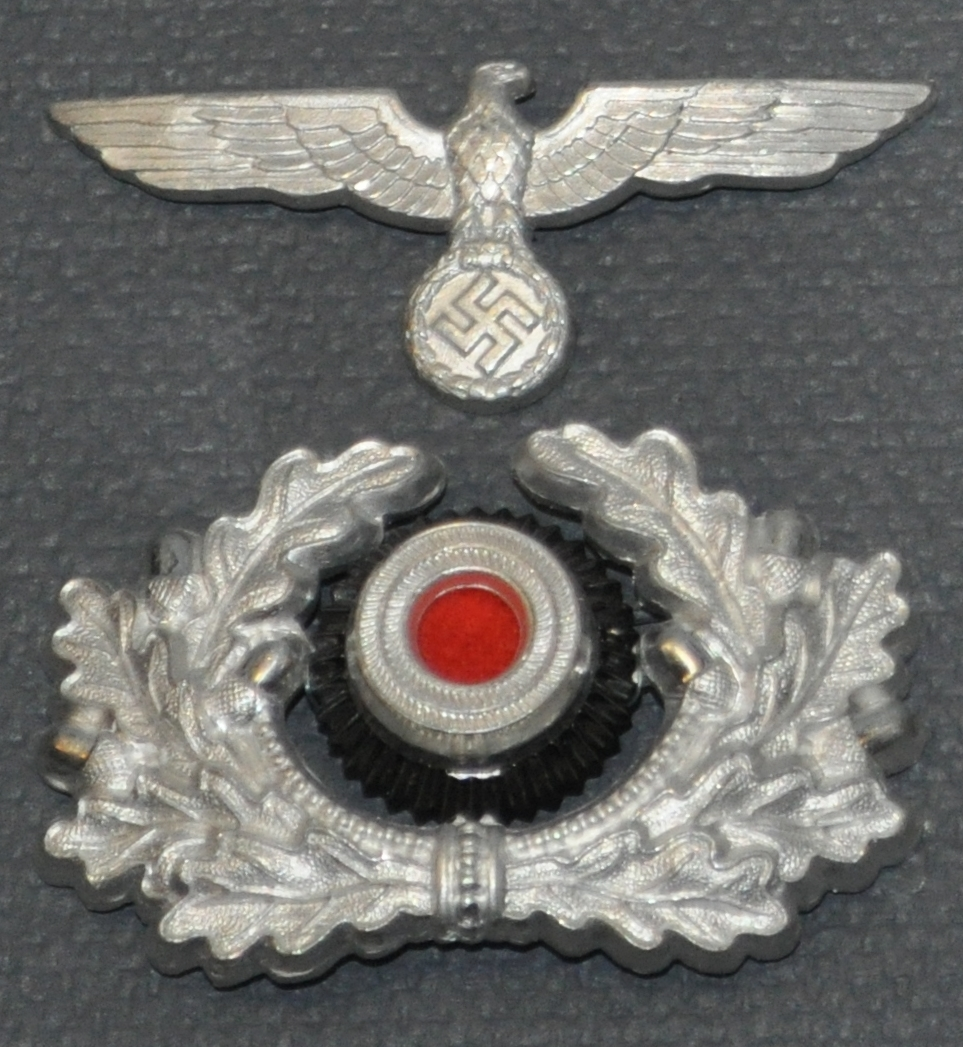
Eagle/swastika and wreathed cockade used on the peaked cap (Schirmmütze).

Decals of Heer used on various helmets.

Caps and helmets bore two common insignia elements, in various forms: the National Emblem and the national colors. World War I caps had carried dual cockades or roundels, one in Imperial black-white-red and one in the colors of the particular State within the Empire. The Reichswehr changed this to a single cockade in the Weimar Republic's black, red and gold; almost as soon as Hitler took power he restored the pre-1919 tricolor flag, and ordered the Army to return to black-white-red.

==== Belt buckles (Koppelschlösser) ====
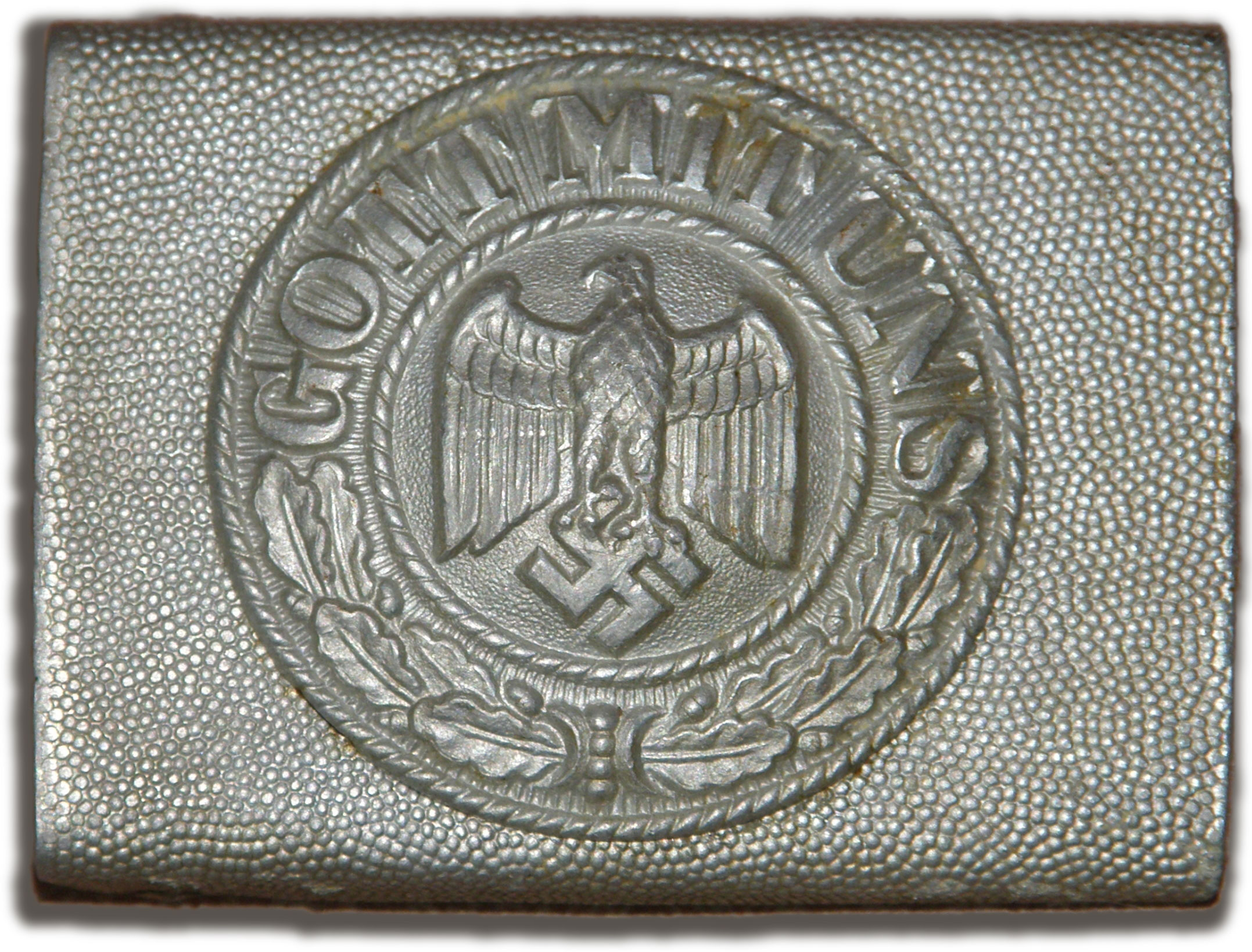
Enlisted man's Koppelschloß

Belt buckles for enlisted men were of box type, made of aluminum or stamped steel and bearing a circular device with a version of the Hoheitszeichen called the Army eagle or Heeresadler (an eagle with downswept wings clutching an unwreathed swastika) surmounted by the motto Gott mit uns ("God with us"). For field wear these were usually painted field-grey to reduce visibility and had a smooth finish; on the other hand, dress buckles were silver-washed with a pebbled surface surrounding the Hoheitszeichen.

Officers' field and service buckles were of a two-pronged frame type. With dress uniform officers wore a belt of silver braid with a circular silver-washed or -plated aluminum buckle, in the form of an oakleaf wreath surrounding a Heeresadler. Generals' were the same but gilt or gold-plated.

With the tropical uniform and its belt of cotton webbing, officers wore a buckle identical to the dress buckle but painted olive-drab.

=== Collar patch (Kragenpatte, Kragenspiegel) ===
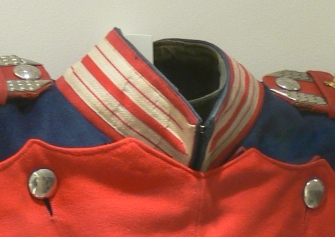
Doppellitze, c. 1900

Officers' version
(embroidered)

dress

field & service

Waffenfarbe (cavalry corps)
NCO version
(machine-woven with encircling braid)

dress

field

Waffenfarbe (armored corps)
Enlisted version

field 1934

Waffenfarbe (artillery)

In 19th century German armies, Guard and other elite regiments wore lengths of double braid (Doppellitze) encircling all or most of the collar as a mark of distinction. By the middle of World War I these ornate collars had been reduced to an embroidered representation of short lengths of braid joined at the ends, sewn to patches worn at the front of the collar. When the Reichsheer was established in 1921 as Germany's first national army (Note: The German Army of Imperial times comprised in wartime the armies of the Kingdoms of Prussia, Saxony, Bavaria and Württemberg under the Prussian General Staff (Generalstab).) Litzen were prescribed as the universal collar device for all personnel other than generals, and the Third Reich continued the practice.

For clarification, however, a distinction must be made between a "collar patch" (German: Kragenpatte or Kragenspiegel), and NCO braid (Unteroffizierslitze or Kragenlitze – the badge of rank of all German NCO ranks), encircling the collar of the uniform tunic. An NCO wore both collar patches and the braid encircling the collar. Commissioned officers wore collar patches only.

==== Design and versions ====
On both collar points of any uniform jacket there was a collar patch. Each patch consisted of the padding, and two parallel facings (German: Patten), the so-called Litzenspiegel, symbolising the double braid of the 19th century.

The padding of full-dress collar patches showed the wearer's Waffenfarbe (corps color). The dress tunic version was embroidered in fine aluminum thread on a patch of badge cloth (German: Abzeichentuch). The backing also showed through in the space between the two parallel facings of the collar patch, and formed so a colour center stripe.

On field – and service uniforms, beginning in late 1935, the collar patch was dark bottle-green to match the collar; the Waffenfarbe "showed through" (in fact colored cord was sewn into) the center strip of each braid, the Litzenspiegel.

For enlisted men, service collar patches were machine-woven in silver-grey rayon; COs' were embroidered more elaborately in white silk or aluminium thread, and were somewhat larger to match their higher collars.

NCOs (German: Unteroffiziere) wore standard enlisted collar patches but were distinguished by a strip of 9mm silver-grey diamond-woven rayon braid (Unteroffoziers-Tressen, NCO-Tressen), sewn around the collar, except on the dress, where the NCO-Tresse was bright aluminum. However, the aluminum-embroidered NCO-Tressen on dress uniforms (German: Ausgangsuniform, Paradeuniform) encircled the collar's upper edge, the simpler NCO-Tressen on service – or field uniform encircled the collar's lower edge.

==== Universal design from 1938 ====
Enlisted versions

Dress

Field, 1938

Field, 1940

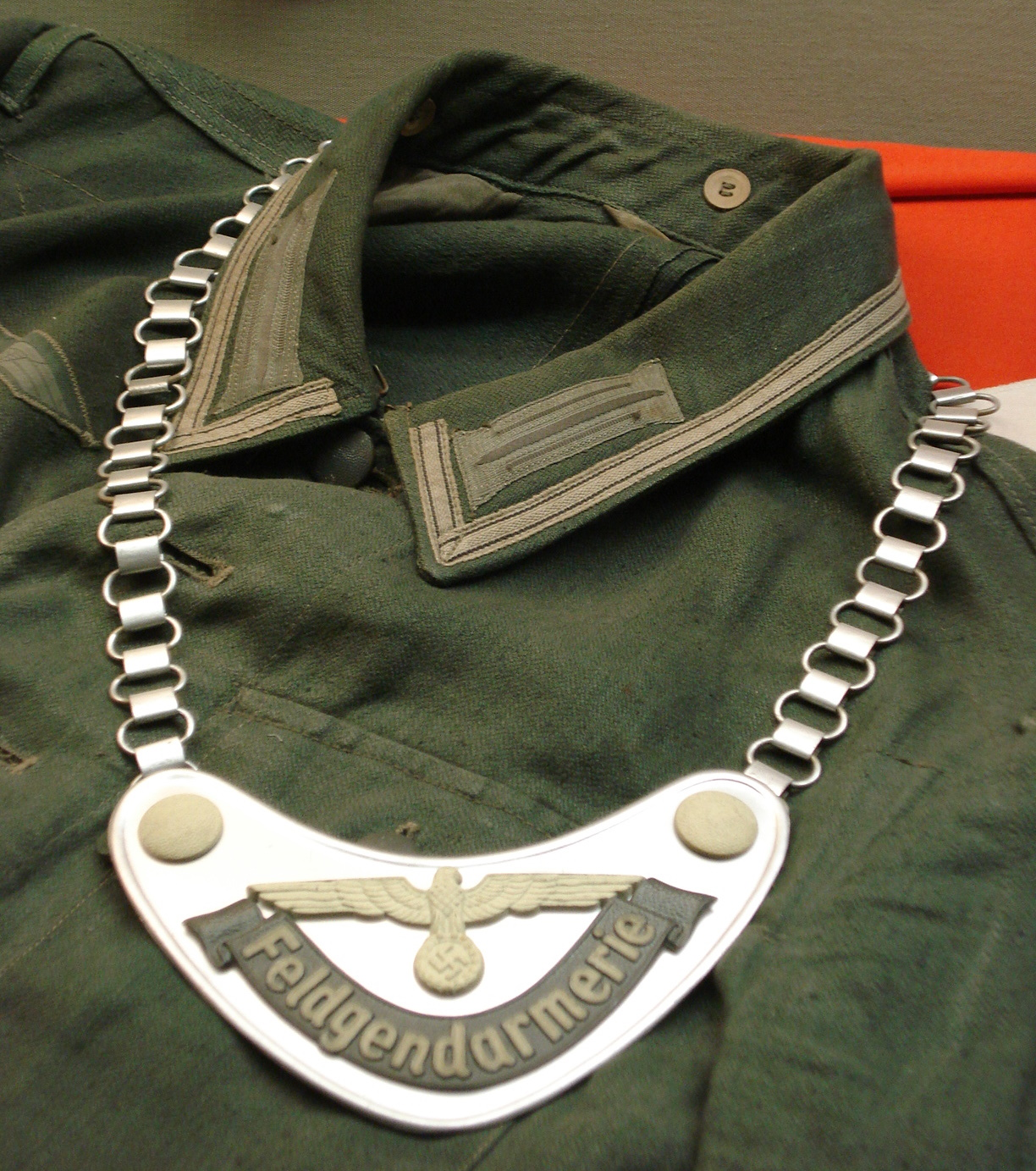
Field tunic with collar patches, NCO-Tressen and Gorget, post 1940.

By 1938 the fast-growing Heer had found that it was impractical, for the enlisted field uniform, to manufacture and stock a multitude of collar patches in assorted Waffenfarben which also had to be sewn on and frequently changed by unit tailors. Accordingly, new universal collar patches were introduced with the Litzenspiegel and Mittelstreifen woven in dark green to match the backing patch, and which could be applied at the factory; Waffenfarbe was now displayed on the shoulder-straps, which simply buttoned on and were easily switched.

With the wartime change to lower-visibility insignia enlisted collar patches were woven in matte "mouse-grey" stripes, which were at first sewn to green collar patches as before but increasingly directly to the collar, which beginning in 1940 was made in feldgrau like the uniform; grey collar patches were never produced. The troops however preferred the green patches (and collars) if they had or could get them, especially on "clean" uniforms for walking-out; and long-service veterans took particular pride in pre-38 versions.

In contrast, officers' service uniform collar patches never changed. While most officers in the front lines wore the enlisted field uniform as per wartime regulations, many opted to have their green-and-silver collar patches added instead of (or on top of) the factory versions.

On olive tropical uniforms the collar patches were tan with dull grey-blue Litzenspiegel for all personnel; officers again sometimes added their green collar patches. Tropical NCO collar Tressen were copper-brown, or sometimes olive drab.

==== Armored vehicle uniforms ====
AFV crew collar insignia
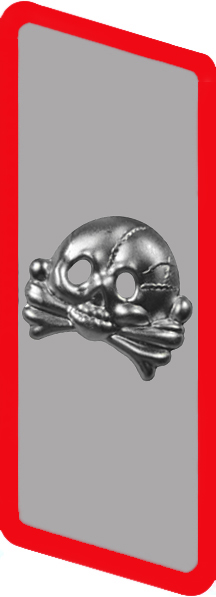
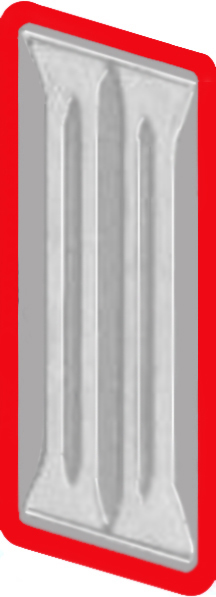
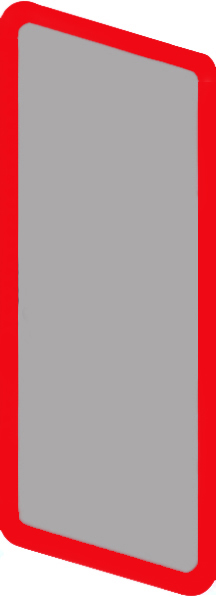
Waffenfarbe (assault artillery)
rank insignias armored troops

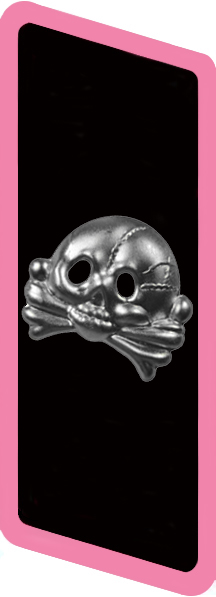
collar patch

shoulder strap

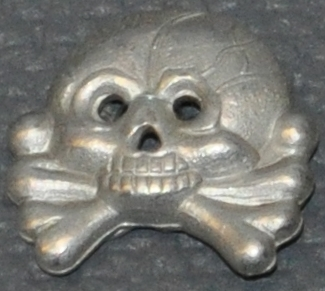
Death's-head

Waffenfarbe (armored corps)

A major exception to the wearing of Litzen was the "panzer wrap" (German: Panzerjacke), the double-breasted jacket worn by crews of tanks and other armored vehicles. When the Panzertruppe were established in 1935 they were issued a distinctive black uniform and as a badge the Totenkopf or Death's-head, versions of which had formerly been worn by the Imperial tank corps and various cavalry units. These skulls took the form of white-metal pins attached to black Kragenpatten which were edged in Waffenfarbe piping.

In mid-1940 crews of assault guns (Sturmgeschütze) received a uniform of their own, identical in cut to the Panzerjacke but in standard field-grey, which they wore with red artillery piping. Over the course of the war a bewildering and changing series of regulations governed the uniforms and insignia for assault guns, tank destroyers, armored cars and self-propelled guns (SPG). Depending on the unit and the date either the black or grey wrap or the standard Feldbluse might be authorized, and on the grey "assault gun" jacket the regulation collar patches could be black with skulls, or grey with skulls, Litzen, or no device at all. The result in practice was chaos; wartime photos show a mix of uniforms and insignia worn not only in the same battalion, but even in the same vehicle.

Officially both colours of panzer wrap were working and field uniforms to be worn only in or around the vehicle; this regulation was universally ignored. Panzertruppen were issued standard uniforms for service-dress and walking out but rarely wore them, much preferring their unique jackets.

In North Africa, AFV crews wore the same tropical uniform as the other branches, including collar patches; many tankers however pinned their Totenkopf badges to their lapels.

==== Infanterie Regiment "Großdeutschland" ====
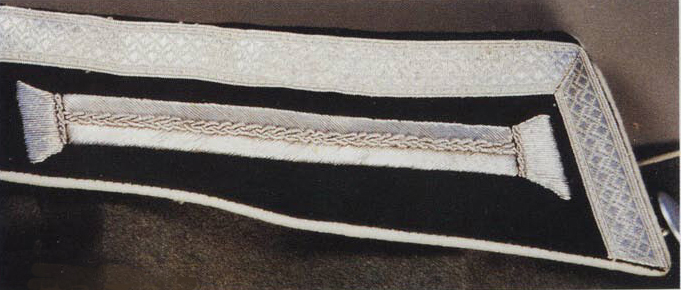
NCOs' collar patch and Tressen of I.R. "Großdeutschland"

In June 1939, the Wehrmacht Heer wanted to renew its ties with the Old Army tradition by introducing a new uniform for its most prestigious unit: Wachregiment "Berlin" which was renamed Infantry Regiment "Großdeutschland". The new dress uniform for I.R. "Großdeutschland" had an elongated collar patch with single Litzenspiegel for NCOs and two for enlisted. Although shown to the press, this new uniform was not provided to the unit due to the outbreak of World War II and was placed in depot storage.

==== General Staff Corps Officers ====
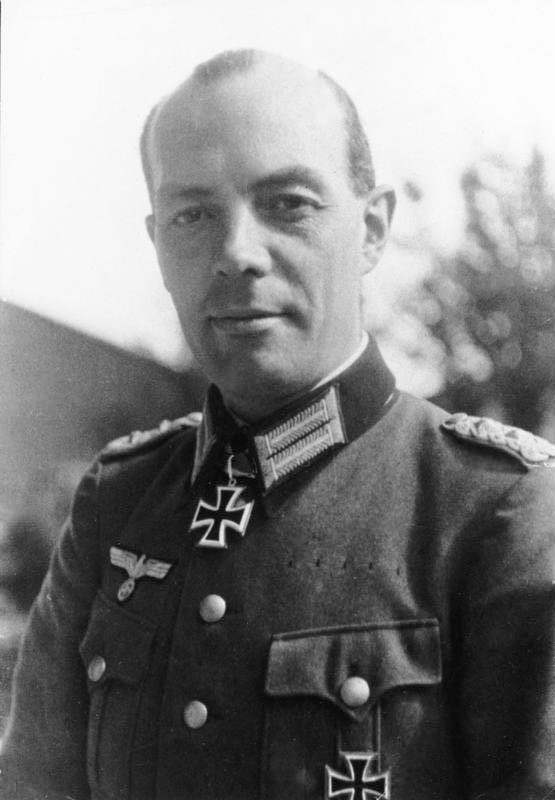
Rudolf Christoph Freiherr von Gersdorff as Oberst im Generalstab.

Collar patches of General Staff officers

field & service

dress uniform

OKW/OKH dress uniform

Waffenfarbe (generalstaff)

Generalstaboffiziere were officers carefully selected and trained to represent the German General Staff Corps in both command and staff functions. They ranked from Hauptmann im Generalstab (captain) through Oberst i.G. (colonel). All were, before 1939, graduates of the Military Academy, the Kriegsakademie. On division staffs they held the position of Ia (operational chief of staff) or Ib (chief of the rear echelon). In the higher echelons, the intelligence and training staff sections were most of the time in the personal charge of General Staff Corps officers. The General Staff Officers had their own distinctive Litzen called alt-Preußische (old Prussian), or Kolbenstickerei ("lobe-embroidery"). These were the same whether on carmine dress Kragenpatten or green service patches; colored Litzenspiegel were unnecessary. General Staff officers assigned to the supreme headquarters (the Reichskriegsministerium, later the OKH and the OKW), the Kriegsakademie, and military attaches were further distinguished by having their Litzen in gold rather than silver. These Generalstaboffiziere were called "des Generalstabs", Oberst d.G., etc. The special golden Litzen were abolished in November 1942. Only Military attaches kept their Litzen as long as they were in their present position. The Führer wanted a closer union between the front and the OKW and OKH.

In addition to their collar patches, General Staff Officers wore trouser-stripes, of the same design as generals' but in carmine rather than scarlet.

==== Generals ====
Arabesques

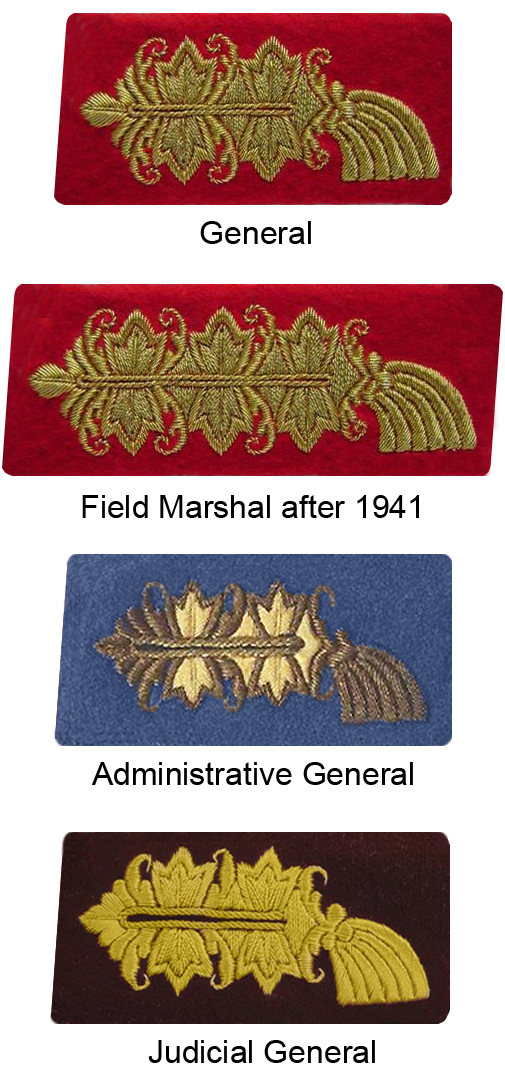
WWII variants

Modern day Bundeswehr

Walter von Reichenau

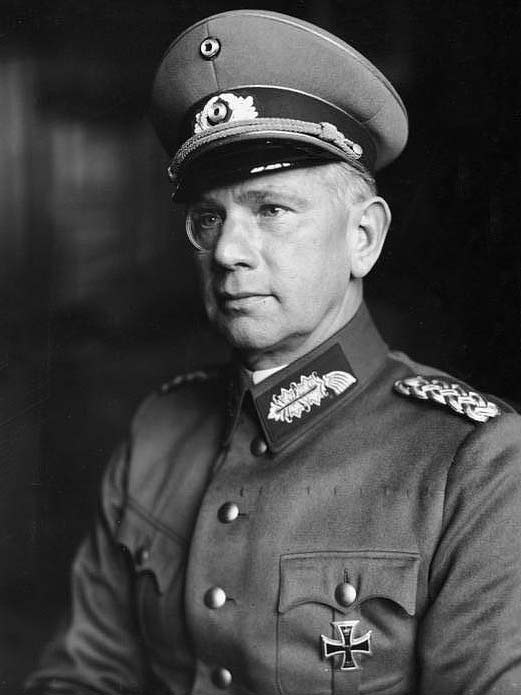
As Generalmajor

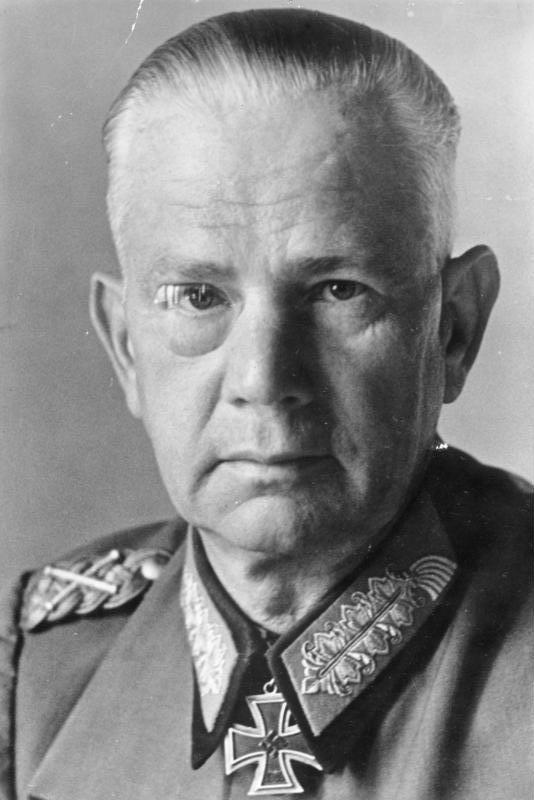
As Field Marshal

From 1900 and on Prussian generals had worn ornate collar patches embroidered in a style called alt-Larisch, which had first been worn in the 18th century by the 26th (älterer von Larisch) Infantry Regiment; the Reichsheer and the Wehrmacht continued the tradition. These devices, sometimes called Arabesken (arabesques), were embroidered in gold bullion or golden synthetic Celleon on Hochrot (scarlet) backing.

Field Marshals wore the same Arabesken as generals until April 1941, when they were authorized a longer variant with three rather than two iterations of the repeating pattern, for a total of six "prongs". In some cases GFM did not bother to replace their generals' tabs, or did so only on their dress uniforms.

General officers of the Special Troop Service (Truppensonderdienst – TDS) and of the specialist careers (medical, veterinary, ordnance, and motor park) wore the same insignia until April 1944, when they were ordered to exchange their scarlet Kragenpatten for alt-Larisch tabs backed in their respective Waffenfarbe:

- bright blue – TDS administrative;
- cornflower blue – medical;
- orange – ordnance; (Note: Before June 1944 their Waffenfarbe was bright red.)
- pink – motor park;
- carmine – veterinary;
- wine red – TDS judiciary.

In October 1944, the wear-out period of the scarlet backing color for Generals of the specialist careers was extended for an undetermined period.

These arabesque collar patches are still worn today by general officers of the present-day Bundeswehr.

===== Chief =====
Kragenpatte & Epaulette of von Rundstedt

In the Wehrmacht Heer, upon retirement, certain senior German generals were awarded the honorary post of Chef (Chief) of a regiment, much like the Honorary Colonel in the British Army. It was a German custom dating from the late 18th century. These generals were authorized to wear the tunic and insignia of an officer of the regiment, including ordinary officers' Litzen. Field Marshal Gerd von Rundstedt, Chef of the 18th Infantry Regiment, wore a big 18 on his shoulder boards, and for everyday wear favored the ornamented tunic of an infantry officer with white piping rather than a general's uniform.

Hitler appointed first Generaloberst Hans von Seeckt, the old Chef der Heeresleitung, to be Chef of the 67th Infantry Regiment on his 70th birthday in April 1936, a few months before he died. Only seven German generals were appointed Chefs: in addition to Seeckt and Rundstedt they were General der Infanterie Ritter von Epp (Chef of the 61st Infantry Regiment in Munich); Generalfeldmarschall von Mackensen (Chef of the 5th Cavalry Regiment in Stolp); Generaloberst von Fritsch (Chef of the 12th Artillery Regiment in Schwerin); and Generalfeldmarschall von Böhm-Ermolli (Chef of the 28th Infantry Regiment in Troppau). Generalfeldmarschall von Blomberg was appointed Chef of the 73rd Infantry Regiment and wore a big 73 superimposed over the crossed batons of his shoulder board, but on 4 February 1938 he was dismissed and his name was deleted from the seniority list.

=== Shoulder-straps (Schulterklappen) and shoulder boards (Schulterstücke) ===
==== Enlisted men ====
until 1933

Panzer

1945

The Reichsheer's shoulder-straps to enlisted men (German: Mannschaften) were very similar to those of World War I, made of feldgrau uniform cloth with pointed or "gable" button ends. In December 1934 the material was changed to grey badge-cloth (Abzeichentuch) and in September 1935 changed again to dark bottle-green (flaschengrün). These "first pattern" shoulder-straps were not edged in Waffenfarbe piping.

In 1938, simultaneous with the removal of Waffenfarbe from field-uniform collar patches, new shoulder-straps were issued. These "second pattern" straps had round rather than pointed ends, and were edged on three sides with wool (later rayon) piping in Waffenfarbe. This pattern would be used through the end of the war, although in 1940 manufacture reverted to field-grey uniform cloth, and as usual alternate versions were made to go with the Panzer uniform (black), tropical uniform (olive cotton) and HBT summer uniform (reed-green twill). Schulterklappen were not worn with the fatigue uniform, nor with camouflage smocks and parkas which used an alternate system of rank insignia.

For junior enlisted men (Mannschaften), rank insignia if any was worn on the left sleeve. However the epaulettes did indicate the wearer's unit (usually regiment or independent battalion) together with his sub-branch if any, machine-embroidered in branch-color. For example, a Schulterklappe with rose-pink piping and number "4" would indicate the 4th Panzer Regiment; but if it carried a pink number "4" and letter "A" it would indicate the 4th Armored Reconnaissance (Aufklärungs) Battalion. The German Army used a very large assortment of Latin initials, Gothic initials, script ciphers, Arabic numerals, Roman numerals and symbols to designate all its various service branches and installations. Before the war, shoulder-buttons were embossed with the number of the wearer's company as well, this practice was discontinued "for the duration."

Beginning in January 1940, shoulder-straps with unit insignia were (supposed to be) phased out as a security measure, and removable fabric loops with devices were issued instead. In May 1944 the embroidery was changed from waffenfarbe to light gray.

==== NCOs ====
Stabsfeldwebel, engineering

Non-commissioned officers (German: Unteroffiziere) wore their rank insignia on their shoulder-straps, consisting of braid and white-metal rank stars. An Unteroffizier's epaulette was edged with Tresse on three sides and an Unterfeldwebel's on all four. Senior NCO's (Unteroffiziere mit Portepee) added one to three stars; in addition, their unit identifiers took the form of white-metal insignia rather than embroidery.

Shoulder-straps were made in both a standard width (4.5 cm, 1.8 in) and a wider one for three-digit unit numbers (5.3 cm, 2.1 in), and in three lengths depending on the size of the man. There was in addition an extra-large size for the overcoat (Mantel).

==== Officers ====
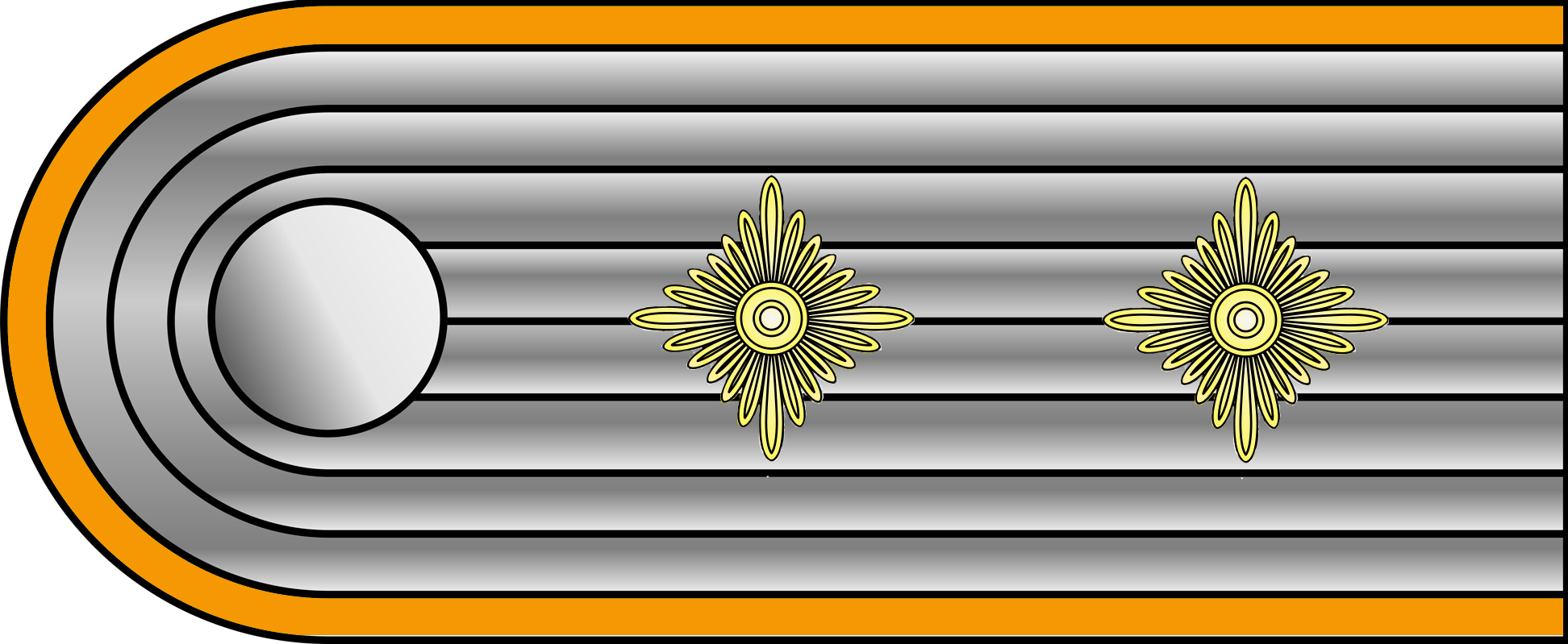
company-grade officers

field-grade officer

Officers' shoulder boards were constructed from "Russia" braid, an aluminum-thread double piping. Company-grade officers (Leutnant through Hauptmann/Rittmeister) wore epaulettes constructed by wrapping two side-by-side lengths of braid around the buttonhole and back, giving the appearance of eight parallel cords; the whole was sewn to an underlay (Unterlagen) of Waffenfarbe badge-cloth. Until 1938 the underlay was of the same outer dimensions as the braid, and only visible edge-on; in that year the underlay was made wider, so as to create the impression of edge piping like the enlisted shoulder-strap. Rank was indicated by zero to two gilt-metal rank stars; unit designators were also of gilt metal.

Field-grade officer (Stabsoffizier) shoulder boards were made by plaiting together double widths of Russia braid and looping them to form a buttonhole, sewn to a Waffenfarbe underlay; rank again was displayed by zero to two gilt stars.

Once the war began, dull grey aluminum braid appeared, but bright aluminum continued in use.

==== Generals ====
Generals' shoulder boards, Wehrmacht (Heer)

- 1 Generalfeldmarschall (Shoulder strap from April 1941)
- 2 Generalfeldmarschall (Shoulder strap prior to April 1941)
- 3 Generaloberst
- 4 General of the branch
- 5 Generalleutnant
- 6 Generalmajor

Generals' shoulder boards were constructed similarly to those of field-grade officers, but comprised a length of silver Russia braid between two braided cords of gold bullion or Celleon. Since the resulting combination was wider, generals' boards were plaited in four 'loops' rather than five. Their buttons were gilt, and rank was indicated by zero to three silver rank stars, or crossed batons in the case of field marshals. The underlay was scarlet, except (from 1944) for generals of staff corps, who were instructed to wear Waffenfarbe instead.

In April 1941, Generalfeldmarschall epaulettes were changed to incorporate a central gold cord instead of silver.

Colonels-in-chief wearing that uniform wore gold generals' shoulder boards underlaid with the Waffenfarbe of the regiment rather than scarlet; GFM von Rundstedt sometimes simply pinned his crossed batons to an infantry colonel's epaulettes.

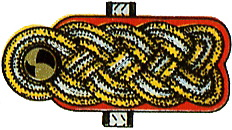
Shoulderboard Generalmajor ret. with the bridle in the middle

==== Retired personnel ====
By order of Reichspresident Hindenburg in March 1932, soldiers who retired after 15 years of service received the right to wear the uniform of the unit they left. The shoulder boards and shoulder straps of retired soldiers had a bridle 1.5 cm wide attached under the middle.

=== Other insignia ===
==== Denim insignia ====
During the winter of 1938, certain rank were issued insignia to the wear with the denim uniform (German: Drillichrock).

Drillichrock
Oberschütze (on the sleeve)	Gefreiter (on the sleeve)	Unteroffizier (on the collar)	Feldwebel (on the lower sleeve)	Oberfeldwebel (on the lower sleeve)	Stabsfeldwebel (on the lower sleeve)	Hauptfeldwebel (on the lower sleeve)

==== Smock/parka rank insignia ====
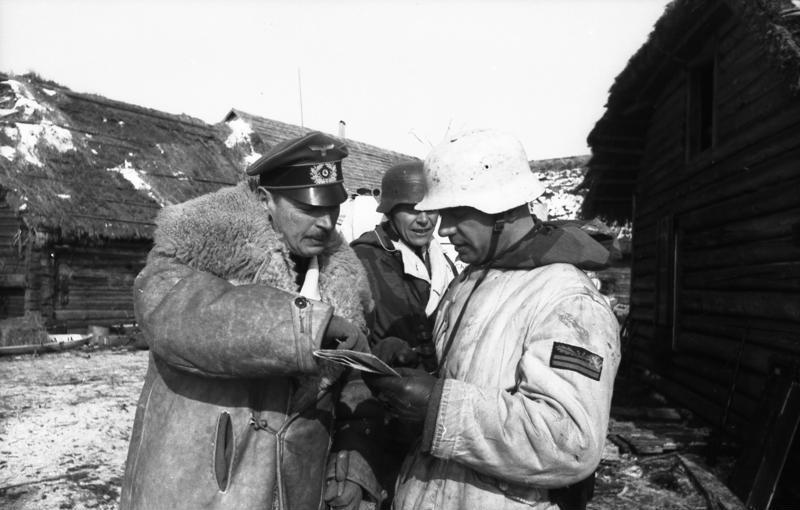
Oberleutnant rank insignia

When wearing uniforms without epaulettes, such as smocks, parkas and mountain windbreakers; generals, officers and NCOs instead wore sleeve rank insignia. These were made up of bars & oak leaves and were introduced by the late summer of 1942. The ranks were used by the army and the Waffen-SS. By 1943, the ranks were also introduced to the Wehrmachtbeamte and the Sonderführer.

=== Tassels ===
First introduced in the Prussian army in 1808, the coloured sidearm tassels were used as a decorative piece of equipment and to differentiate between companies within a regiment. Ranks below Fänrich were issued either the Troddel or Faustriemen depending on their unit. The Troddel was used by infantry, artillery, pioneer, signal, anti-tank and supply troops. While the Faustriemen was worn by cavalry and rifle troops. Additionally, some units would wear honorary tassels of Russian red leather, to indicate their relation to the 1st Regiment of (Prussian) Grenadier Guards. Unteroffiziere mit Portepee would wear tassels independently of their company relations.

The tassels are shown below, where Arabic numerals refer to the company/battery/squadron:

	Troddel																
Infantry	Staff	I	1	2	3	4		II	5	6	7	8		III	9	10	11
Artillery			1	2	3				4	5	6				7	8	9
Horse artillery & Artillery instruction			1	2	3				4	5	6						
Rifle			1	2	3	4	5		6	7	8	9	10				
	Troddel																
Infantry	12	IV	13	14	15	16	17	V	18	19	20	E	9t	10t	11t	12t	NCO
	Faustriemen																
Cavalry & Rifle	Staff	I	1	2	3	4	5	II	6	7	8	9	10	III	11		
Horse artillery, Motorised & Armoured			1	2	3				4	5	6				7	8	9
Roman numerals: Battalion staff t: Honorary knots (Erinnerungstroddeln); E: Supplementary company

== Ranks and rank insignia ==
=== Rank tables ===
==== Enlisted personnel (Mannschaften) ====
Enlisted collar Litzen

1935

1938

1940

Dress

Tropical

Red Waffenfarbe: artillery
Enlisted Schulterklappen

until 1933

1938

1940

Panzer uniform

Tropical

White Waffenfarbe: infantry, rose pink: armor

Insignia		Rank	Translation	Approximate equivalents during World War II		Notes
Shoulder	Sleeve	Rank	Translation	UK	US	Notes
	—N/a	Soldat	Soldier	Private	Private	Soldat was the generic term; for actual ranks see below. It could be advanced directly to Gefreiter.
	—N/a	Soldat (Unteroffizieranwärter UA)	Soldier (NCO aspirant)	NCO candidate		Soldier selected for or attending Unteroffizierschule (NCO school); could be of any rank from Soldat through Stabsgefreiter.
	—N/a	Soldat (Offizieranwärter OA)	Soldier (Officer aspirant)	Officer candidate 2nd class		See below
		Obersoldat (Note: These ranks were, in effect, dead end paygrades for passed-over soldiers) (from 1936)	Senior private	Senior private	Private 1st class	Obersoldat was the generic term; for actual ranks see below. Automatic after 12 (later 6) months if not yet advanced to Gefreiter.
		Gefreiter	"Exempted"	Lance corporal	Acting corporal	Historically in German armies, a Gefreiter was an experienced soldier who by virtue of seniority was exempted from more menial duties.
		Gefreiter (Offizieranwärter OA)	"Exempted" (Officer aspirant)	Officer candidate 1st class		See below
		Obergefreiter	Senior "Exempted"	Lance corporal	Corporal	Second sleeve insignia indicates 6 years of service. (Note: There is confusion in the published sources; see discussion)
		Stabsgefreiter (from 1942)	Staff "Exempted"	Lance corporal	Administrative corporal	The rank was commonly trusted with positions in food provision supply and quartermaster duties. In the last years of World War II Stabsgefreiters were often used as group leaders Gruppenführer due to a lack of Unteroffiziere (NCOs). Promotions to this rank were suspended in 1934, although existing Stabsgefreiters retained it; promotions resumed in 1942.

==== Non-commissioned officers (Unteroffiziere) ====
NCO Litzen and Tresse

1935

1938

1940

Dress

Tropical

Rose-pink Waffenfarbe: armored troops
NCO Schulterklappen

until 1933

1938

1940

Panzer uniform

Tropical

Insignia		Rank	Translation	Approximate equivalents during World War II		Notes
Shoulder	Sleeve	Rank	Translation	UK	US	Notes
Unteroffiziere ohne Portepee (Note: Portepee "sword-knot": senior NCOs wore swords with dress uniform) (Junior NCOs)
		Unteroffizier; Oberjäger (Light and mountain infantry)	Under-officer; Senior ranger	Corporal	Sergeant	Originally only upon completion of NCO school; later also an automatic promotion for acting squad leaders with 4 months of combat experience. Could be advanced directly to Feldwebel / Wachtmeister.
		Fahnenjunker-Unteroffizier (Offiziersanwärter OA)	Ensign (with grade of Sgt)	Officer candidate Corporal		Unteroffizier shoulder board, additional with two silver strips
		Unterfeldwebel; Unterwachtmeister (Note: Title used by the cavalry, artillery and transport troops)	Junior field usher Junior watch master	Sergeant	Staff sergeant	Called Sergeant until 1921. Automatically after 6 years of service and 3 years as an Unteroffizier if not yet advanced to Feldwebel / Wachtmeister.
		Fahnenjunker-Unterfeldwebel (Offiziersanwärter OA)	Ensign (with grade of SSgt)	Officer candidate Sergeant	Probationary officer	Unterfeldwebel shoulder board, additional with two silver strips
Unteroffiziere mit Portepee (Senior NCOs)
		Feldwebel; Wachtmeister	Field usher Watch master	Staff sergeant	Technical sergeant	From mid-war an automatic promotion for acting platoon leaders with 4 months of combat experience.
		Fahnenjunker-Feldwebel (Offiziersanwärter OA)	Ensign (with grade of TSgt)	Officer candidate		Feldwebel shoulder board, additional with two silver strips
		Oberfeldwebel; Oberwachtmeister	Senior field usher Senior watch master	Sergeant major	Master sergeant	Hauptfeldwebel (First Sergeant/CSM) was normally of this rank.
		Fahnenjunker-Oberfeldwebel (Offiziersanwärter OA)	Ensign (with grade of MSgt)	Officer candidate		Oberfeldwebel shoulder board (additional with two silver strips), worn with officer's uniform
		Stabsfeldwebel; Stabswachtmeister	Staff field usher Staff watch master	Regimental sergeant major	Sergeant major (Note: While the contemporary Department of War states that sergeant major was equivalent to Stabsfeldwebel, SM did not exist as title of rank or grade at that time.)	Restricted to career volunteers; automatically after 12 years of service. Rank created in 1938.
		Fahnenjunker-Stabsfeldwebel (Offiziersanwärter OA)	Ensign (with grade of Regimental Sergeant Major)	Officer candidate		Stabsfeldwebel shoulder board (additional with two silver strips), worn with officer's uniform

The Hauptfeldwebel's "piston rings"

Hauptfeldwebel/Hauptwachtmeister: Hauptfeldwebel was not a rank but an appointment: the administrative and mustering NCO of a company and the commander's logistical assistant. He was therefore roughly analogous to a Company Sergeant-Major or First Sergeant, although his duties did not usually involve combat leadership. Der Spieß (Note: "The spear." This may refer to the sergeant of a flintlock-era company having carried a polearm rather than a musket, or it may relate to Latin pilus prior "leading spear," the senior centurion in a cohort.) or die Mutter der Kompanie, as he was called, was not necessarily the ranking Unteroffizier in the company, especially since typically two of the platoons were commanded by senior NCOs rather than officers. A Hauptfeldwebel however had to be of Portepee grade; a junior NCO filling the role was a Hauptfeldwebeldiensttuer, "one doing Hauptfeldwebel duties."

The insignia for a Hauptfeldwebel was a pair of NCO Tressen encircling each lower sleeve, nicknamed "piston rings;" he also carried a leather Meldetasche or report-case tucked into his tunic front.

==== Senior non-commissioned specialist officers ====
In two specialist career paths it was possible to attain rank above Stabsfeldwebel: fortifications engineers (Festungspioniere) and farriers (Hufbeschlagschmieder). (Note: Farriers, blacksmiths specializing in the shoeing and care of horses, were a very important component of the WWII German army, 70–80% of which depended on horse-drawn transport. A standard infantry division had nearly 5,000 horses, one for every three soldiers.) They were actual NCOs with command authority, not Heeresbeamten (uniformed Army civil servants). There was no direct equivalent in the English-speaking world; perhaps the closest examples of the time would be the British Royal Navy's and United States Navy's ranks of Warrant Officer.

Insignia	Rank	Translation
	Festungswerkmeister; Hufbeschlaglehrmeister	Fortress works master Farrier instruction master
	Festungsoberwerkmeister; Oberhufbeschlaglehrmeister	Fortress senior works master Senior farrier instruction master

These men wore shoulder boards braided in a unique pattern, orange-red and silver on black underlay with Gothic "Fp" for fortress engineers, (Note: Combining the Waffenfarben of the ordnance and engineer branches) and gold-yellow and silver on carmine with a horseshoe device for farriers. (Note: Combining the Waffenfarben of the cavalry and veterinary branches; farriers were responsible for basic equine healthcare and assisting veterinary officers)

==== Officer candidates (Fähnriche) ====
Officer candidate collar insignia

Offizier-Bewerber

Offizier-Anwärter

Oberfähnrich

To 1940	1940–1941	1942–1945	Translation	Notes
Fahnenjunker	Schütze (Offizier-Bewerber)	Schütze (Offizier-Bewerber)	Flag-Squire; Rifleman (Officer Applicant)	Officer candidate in basic training
Fahnenjunker-Gefreiter	Gefreiter (Offizier-Bewerber)	Gefreiter (Offizier-Bewerber)	Flag-Squire Lance Corporal; Lance Corporal (Officer Applicant)	Officer candidate in advanced training with the Field Army
Fahnenjunker-Unteroffizier; Fahnenjunker-Oberjäger	Unteroffizier (Offizier-Anwärter); Oberjäger (Offizier-Anwärter)	Fahnenjunker-Unteroffizier; Fahnenjunker-Oberjäger	Flag-Squire Under-officer/Flag-Squire Senior Ranger; Under-officer (Officer Candidate)/Senior Ranger (Officer Candidate)	Cadet beginning Officer Candidate School or specialist academy
Fähnrich	Feldwebel (Offizier-Anwärter); Wachtmeister (Offizier-Anwärter)	Fahnenjunker-Feldwebel; Fahnenjunker-Wachtmeister	Ensign; Field Guide (Officer Candidate)/Watch Master (Officer Candidate); Flag-Squire Field Guide/Flag-Squire Watch Master	Cadet completing Officer Candidate School or specialist academy
Oberfähnrich; Unterarzt (physician); Unterapotheker (pharmacist); Unterveterinär (veterinary); Oberfähnrich im Ing. Korps (Engineering); Feuerwerker m. b. Offiziersprüfung (Ordnance)	Oberfähnrich; Unterarzt; Unterveterinär; Unterapotheker; Feldingenieur; Oberfähnrich (Waffen)	Oberfähnrich; Unterarzt; Unterapotheker; Unterveterinär; Feldingenieur; Oberfähnrich (Waffen)	Senior Ensign; Undersurgeon; Underpharmacist; Underveterinarian; Sr. Ensign in the Engineer Corps/Field Engineer; Fireworker with passed officer examination/Sr. Ensign (Ordnance)	Graduate serving as acting lieutenant, ensign or 3rd Lieutenant prior to commissioning as an officer.

==== Officers (Offiziere) ====
Officers' collar insignia

Field and service

Dress

Gold-yellow Waffenfarbe: cavalry

Insignia		Rank	Translation	Approximate equivalents during World War II	
Shoulder	Sleeve	Rank	Translation	UK	US
Leutnante
		Leutnant; Assistenzarzt (Medical); Veterinär (Veterinary)	Lieutenant; Assistant Surgeon; Veterinarian	Second lieutenant	Second lieutenant
		Oberleutnant; Oberarzt (Medical); Oberveterinär (Veterinary)	Senior Lieutenant; Senior Surgeon; Senior Veterinarian	Lieutenant	First lieutenant
Hauptleute
		Hauptmann; Rittmeister (Mounted branches); Stabsarzt (Medical); Stabsveterinär (Veterinary) Kriegsrichter (Judicial before 1944) Kriegsgerichtsrat im Hauptmannsrang (Judicial before 1944); Stabsrichter (Judicial after 1944); Heereshilfspfarrer (Chaplain) (Note: Chaplains wore no epaulettes, a cross on the front of the cap, and a cross (Protestant) or crucifix (Catholic) around the neck. In the field chaplains wore a Red Cross armband with purple borders.)	lit. 'Head man' Riding Master; Staff Surgeon; Staff Veterinarian War Judge War Court Council in Captain's Rank; Staff Judge (Note: No official translation in the military dictionary.); Army Assistant Chaplain	Captain	Captain
Stabsoffiziere
		Major; Oberstabsarzt (Medical); Oberstabsveterinär (Veterinary) Kriegsgerichtsrat im Majorsrang (Judicial before 1944); Oberstabsrichter (Judicial after 1944); Heerespfarrer (Chaplain)	Major; Senior Staff Surgeon; Senior Staff Veterinarian War Court Council in Major's Rank; Senior Staff Judge; Army Chaplain	Major	Major
		Oberstleutnant; Oberfeldarzt (Medical); Oberfeldveterinär (Veterinary) Oberkriegsgerichtsrat (Judicial before 1944); Oberrichter (Judicial after 1944); Heeresoberpfarrer (Chaplain)	lit. 'Lieutenant Colonel'; Senior Field Surgeon; Senior Field Veterinarian Senior War Court Council; Senior Judge; Army Senior Chaplain	Lieutenant colonel	Lieutenant colonel
		Oberst; Oberstarzt (Medical); Oberstveterinär (Veterinary) Oberstkriegsgerichtsrat (Judicial before 1944); Oberstrichter (Judicial after 1944); Wehrmachtsdekan (Chaplain)	lit. 'Seniormost'; Seniormost Surgeon; Seniormost Veterinarian Seniormost War Court Council; Seniormost Judge; Defence Force Dean	Colonel	Colonel

==== General officers and marshals (Generäle) ====
In addition to their alt-Larisch collar tabs and braided gold epaulettes, general officers' uniforms were distinguished by gold rather than silver cap badges, cap cords, breast eagles, belt buckles and buttons, a pair of 40mm Hochrot (scarlet) stripes down the outside of each trouser-leg, overcoat lapels faced in scarlet, and dress uniforms piped in Hochrot rather than Waffenfarbe.

From May 1944 generals in the various staff corps (medical, legal, TSD etc.) were supposed to replace Hochrot with the appropriate Waffenfarben of their branches of service; in practice this directive was imperfectly heeded and a subsequent order extended the wear-out date for scarlet insignia indefinitely.

Insignia		Rank	Translation	Approximate equivalents during World War II	
Shoulder	Sleeve	Rank	Translation	UK	US
Veterinary:		Generalmajor; Generalarzt (Medical); Generalveterinär (Veterinary) Oberstkriegsgerichtsrat des Dienstaufsichtsbezirks (Judicial before 1944) Reichskriegsgerichtsrat (Judicial before 1944) Reichskriegsanwalt (Judicial before 1944); Chefrichter (Judicial after 1944. Prev. Generalrichter); Feldbischof (Chaplain) (Note: A Feldbischof did not wear generals' collar Arabeske, but rather litzen in gold on a violet backing; his overcoat lapel facings were also violet rather than red.); Generalquartiermeister (Quartermaster)	Major general Major general (Med.); Major general (Vet.) Highest War Court Council in Service District Realm War Court Council Realm War Court Prosecutor; Chief Judge (Prev. General Judge); Chief of chaplains Quartermaster General	Brigadier	Brigadier general
		Generalleutnant; Generalstabsarzt (Medical); Generalstabsveterinär (Veterinary) Senatspräsident am Reichskriegsgericht (Judicial before 1944) Oberreichskriegsanwalt (Judicial before 1944); Generalstabsrichter (Judicial after 1944)	Lieutenant general Lieutenant general (Med.); Lieutenant general (Vet.) Senate President in the Realm War Courts Chief Realm War Prosecutor; General Staff Judge	Major general	Major general
Medical:		General der... — Infanterie — Artillerie — Kavallerie — Panzertruppe (from 1935) — Pioniere (from 1938) — Gebirgstruppe (from 1940) — Nachrichtentruppe (from 1940); Generaloberstabsarzt (Medical); Generaloberstabsveterinär (Veterinary) Ministerialdirektor im OKW (Judicial before 1944); Generaloberstabsrichter (Judicial after 1944)	General of — the infantry — the artillery — the cavalry — the armoured troops — the engineers — the mountain troops — the signals troops Surgeon general Lieutenant general (Vet.) Ministerial Director in the OKW; General Senior Staff Judge	Lieutenant general	Lieutenant general
Colonel general: Colonel general GFM:		Generaloberst — im Range eines Generalfeldmarschalls (GFM)	Colonel General — in the capacity of Field Marshal (Note: A prewar rank discontinued before the outbreak of hostilities. Leftover from the Imperial times, was never awarded.)	General	General
before April 1941: from April 1941:		Generalfeldmarschall	General field marshal	Field marshal	General of the Army

=== Ranks at the Private/Senior Private levels ===
Branch	Soldat	Obersoldat
Infantry; Motorized Infantry (to 7/43)	Schütze (Rifleman) (to 10/42) (Note: In October 1942 all infantry Schützen were redesignated Grenadiere. In July 1943 all Panzerschützen and motorized Grenadiere were redesignated Panzergrenadiere.); Grenadier (from 10/42); Füsilier (Fusilier) (Note: Traditional ranks in certain regiments); Musketier (Musketeer)	Oberschütze; Obergrenadier; Oberfüsilier; Obermusketier
Mechanized Infantry (to 7/43)	Panzerschütze (Armored Rifleman)	Oberpanzerschütze
Motorized Infantry; Mechanized Infantry (from 7/43)	Panzergrenadier (Armored Grenadier)	Panzerobergrenadier
Light and Mountain; Infantry	Jäger (Ranger, Hunter)	Oberschütze (Note: Confusingly, Oberjäger was the light-infantry equivalent of Unteroffizier)
Cavalry; Reconnaissance	Reiter (Rider)	Oberreiter (Senior Rider)
Artillery	Kanonier (Gunner); Panzerkanonier (Armored Gunner) (Note: In artillery regiments of Panzer divisions from 12/41)	Oberkanonier; Panzeroberkanonier
Engineers	Pionier (Sapper); Baupionier (Construction Sapper) (from 1943)	Oberpionier; Bauoberpionier
Construction troops	Bausoldat (to 1943)	Oberbausoldat
Signals	Funker (Radioman); Fernsprecher (Telephonist)	Oberfunker; Oberfernsprecher
Armor	Panzerschütze (Armor Rifleman)	Oberpanzerschütze
Armored Engineers	Panzerpionier	Oberpanzerpionier
Armored Signals	Panzerfunker	Oberpanzerfunker
Anti-tank	Panzerjäger (Tank hunter)	Oberpanzerjäger
Motorcycle troops	Kradschütze (Motorcycle Rifleman)	Kradoberschütze
Military Police	Feldgendarm (Field Gendarme)	Feldobergendarm
Transport and Logistics	Fahrer (Driver, horse); Kraftfahrer (Driver, motor vehicles)	Oberfahrer; Oberkraftfahrer
Medical	Sanitätssoldat	Sanitätsobersoldat
Veterinary	Veteriärsoldat	Veteriärobersoldat
Bandsmen	Musiker (to 1936); Musikschütze (Rifleman Musician) (from 1936); Trompeterreiter (Trumpeter) (Cavalry)	Musikoberschütze; Trompeteroberreiter

== Armed Forces officials and Sonderführer ==
=== Armed Forces officials (Wehrmachtbeamte) ===
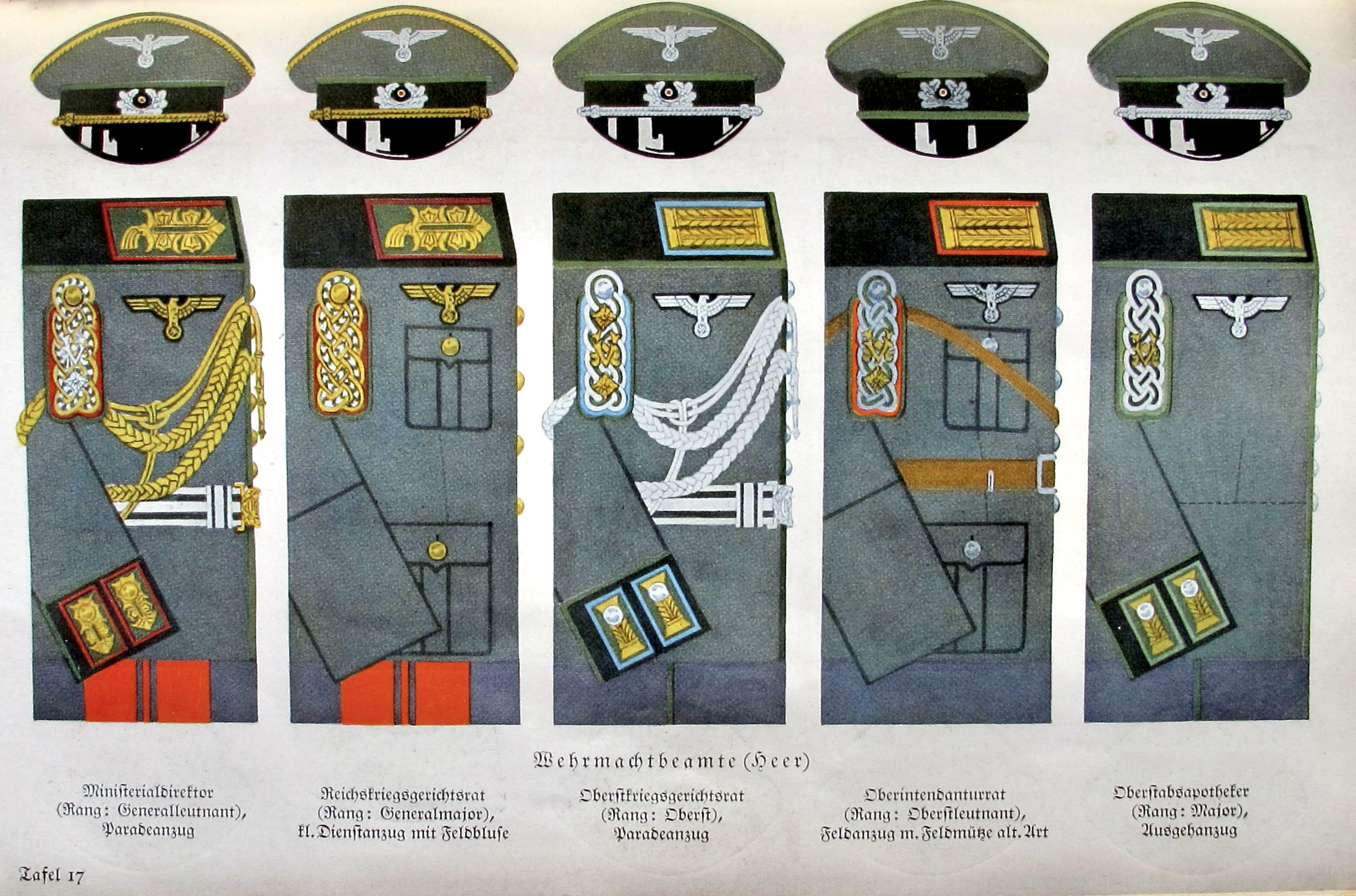
Uniforms of senior military officials in the army.

Officials in administrative, legal, and technical service positions were usually placed in a category unique to the Wehrmacht. They consist of civil service personnel performing functions within the Armed Forces and are recruited, in part, from former professional non-commissioned officers who became military candidates for civil service (German: Militäranwärter) at the end of their 12-year contractual period of active military service.

Up to 1944, none of these officials were classified as soldiers; in that year certain groups were converted into officers in the Special Troop Service (Truppensonderdienst or TSD). These were the higher administrative officers (Intendanten) in ranks from captain to lieutenant general; the lower administrative officers (Zahlmeister) in the ranks of first and second lieutenant, and the judge advocates (Richter) in ranks from captain to lieutenant general. At this time all personnel of the Field Post Office were made soldiers as well, but formed a corps of their own rather than belonging to the TSD. It was also made possible for qualified reserve technical service officials to become reserve officers of the motor maintenance troops.

The officials had civil service grades, not ranks: Intendant, Direktor, Rat, Vorsteher, Inspektor, Meister, Assistent. This is a complex subject as each branch had its own grades.

=== Military officials ===
==== Shoulder boards ====
With certain exceptions, military officials (German: Militär-Beamte) wore shoulder boards similar to those of soldiers of equivalent rank, but distinguished by the addition of dark green elements: those equivalent to generals had a central cord in their braided shoulder boards which incorporated green chevrons, and those equivalent to officers wore a narrow green stripe between the rows of braid. WO-equivalent officials wore a complex braided shoulderboard made of green, black and silver cords. In nearly all cases the shoulderboard underlay was a double layer of dark green under Nebenfarbe, and metal pins with the HV (German abbreviation of Heeresverwaltung, "Army Administration") cipher were worn.

Certain services had insignia of their own: for example the Feldpost ("Field Post Office") wore shoulder boards with gold rather than green elements and the initials FP; and musical officials wore silver-and-red shoulder boards with a lyre insignia. Beamten in the employ of a military administration authority in the occupied territories wore MV (German abbreviation of Militärverwaltung, "Military Administration") pins rather than HV ciphers.

Most officials wore in addition to their dark green Waffenfarbe a secondary colour (Nebenfarbe) denoting their branch:

In March 1940 distinct Nebenfarben were abolished and replaced with light grey.

==== Collar patches ====
Heeresbeamten wore distinctive collar patches; these tabs indicated not the official's rank or grade, but rather the "career" of the service in which the official was employed. These were classified by the minimum educational requirement, and ranged from Einfacher Dienst (Basic Services), for which a grade-school education was sufficient, through Mittlerer (Middle) and Gehobener (Elevated) Dienst, to Höherer Dienst (Higher Services) which required a university degree.

Officials in the Basic Services wore collar patches similar to (but larger than) enlisted soldiers', grey Litzen on dark green Patten, but the patch was piped on three sides in Nebenfarbe; similarly officials in the Middle and Elevated services wore officer-pattern Litzen, again with Nebenfarbe-piped patches. Officials of the Higher Services wore unique Kragenpatten with alt-Preussische Litzen in gold like Offiziere des Generalstabs, but on dark green with, again, Nebenfarbe piping. General officer-equivalents wore green patches with generals' arabesques, similarly bordered.

=== Beamter auf Kriegsdauer ===
In addition to the career Beamten, wartime needs led to the creation of "Officials for the duration of the war," or Beamter auf Kriegsdauer. These men had needed skills but either did not possess all the qualifications to become full-fledged Beamten, or were effectively drafted from civilian jobs. The matter was further confused by the fact that Beamter a. K. did the same jobs and held the same titles as career officials.

Nonetheless, Beamter a. K. wore entirely distinct collar patches. The backing patch was large and piped on three sides like that worn by career Beamten, but was light grey edged in green. The device was a rectangle pointed at the upper end with braid down the center, much like a British general's gorget patch, the colors indicating the degree of the Beamter's service: grey with green braid for basic services, silver with green braid for middle and elevated services, and gold on gold for higher services.

=== Military Supreme Court officials (Wehrmachtbeamte beim Reichskriegsgericht) ===
Officials of the Wehrmacht who worked in Military Supreme Courts wore shoulder straps without the "HV" and had the secondary colour of Bordeaux red (Bordorot').

=== Sonderführer ===
Sonderführer (short: Sdf; or Sf) – in the meaning of specialist leader (literal: special leader) – introduced to the Wehrmacht in the year 1937, wore the standard military uniform but their collars and cap bands were blue-grey rather than Army green, with unique shoulder and collar insignia.

== See also ==
- World War II German uniforms
- Waffenfarbe
- Glossary of German World War II military terms
- Comparative ranks of Nazi Germany
- Comparative officer ranks of World War II
