= Radar, Anti-Aircraft =

Radar, Anti-Aircraft, or simply AA radar for short, was a classification system for British Army radars introduced in 1943 and used into the 1960s when these systems were replaced by missiles with their own integral radar systems. The classification included subcategories, Number 1 through 8, as well as the many individual systems which were assigned Marks.

Some of the Army radars pre-date the introduction of this classification system and had their own nomenclature that tended to remain in use even after they officially received new names. Notable among these are the Gun Laying and Searchlight Control categories. Additionally, equipment introduced after the classification system often have rainbow codes that they are well known by. Some were also used by the Royal Air Force and thus also had an AMES number.

== Number 1 ==
Originally known as GL Mk. I radar, AA No.1 were short range gun laying radars operating in the 1.5 m VHF band used to provide information for an anti-aircraft gun battery. The Mk. 1 version provided only range information, but these were modified to provide elevation and bearing in the Mk. I*, and then redesigned completely for the more accurate Mk. II version. The name AA No. 1 was assigned after the systems were already being replaced, and they were never widely referred to by the new name, remaining better known as GL Mk. I both during and after the war. The microwave-frequency systems that replaced them were assigned Number 3. There were three entries in the Number 1 classification:

- AA No. 1 Mark 1 - GL Mk. I
- AA No. 1 Mark 1* - GL Mk. I*, a slightly upgraded version of the original
- AA No. 1 Mark 2 - GL Mk. II

== Number 2 ==
AA No.2 grouped together a number of otherwise unrelated radar systems formerly known as Searchlight Control, or SLC for short. These radars were associated with individual searchlights, providing their operators with enough directional information that the target aircraft could be picked up in the beam of the light. Once lit up, gunners could use their optical sighting equipment for the final aiming.

The first system, in versions Mk. 1 through 7, operated on the widely used 1.5 m band. This frequency was originally developed for airborne radar systems, using shorter wavelengths than Chain Home in order to reduce the required antenna size. For the SLC role the system was greatly simplified and built inexpensively. Over 10,000 of these early SLC radars were built in a production run spanning from June 1940 to December 1943. These Marks were all identical electronically, differing only on what they searchlight they were mounted on.

AA No. 2 also included the entirely new Mk. 8 and 9, which used a cavity magnetron to work in the 10 cm microwave band, allowing the antennas to be greatly reduced in size. These were given very low priority due to the arrival of larger microwave radars that could directly guide guns without searchlight assistance, and ongoing improvements to ground controlled interception and aircraft interception (AI) radars that meant that searchlights were no longer needed to assist night fighters. The first examples of the Mk. 9 arrived in September 1944, with 350 delivered in total by the end of the run in the immediate post-war era.

== Number 3 ==
AA Number 3 collected a wide variety of microwave-frequency gun laying radars, mostly following the Marks of the earlier Gun Laying category. This was one of the few categories that was used extensively in the post-war era, and thus one of the few that contains entries without a former GL name.

The first entries into this group were originally known as GL Mk. III radar. There were two primary versions of this system, the Mk. III(C) from Canada, and the Mk. III(B) from Britain. These became the No.3 Mk. 1 and Mk. 2, respectively. These units had long development periods and only began widespread deployment in 1943, when they were quickly overtaken by the US SCR-584, and production was curtailed. About 1,500 of the two systems were delivered in total, with deliveries continuing to the end of the war. An advanced auto-tracking system that could be used with the Mk. 3 was developed in 1944 under the code name "Glaxo". Radars equipped with Glaxo were assigned the name AA No. 3 Mk. 4, but it was not taken into service due to the arrival of the SCR-584 which had similar features.

As the delays with both the Canadian and UK versions of the Mk. III were growing, the Army began a rush effort to introduce a greatly improved AA radar operating on well-understood electronics adapted from the 1.5 m aircraft interception radar sets. Known as "Baby Maggie", 176 AA No.3 Mk. 3's were produced, and 50 of these were supplied to the USSR.

The SCR-584 arrived in early 1944 and entered service as the AA No.3 Mk. 5. It saw widespread service during the late stages of the war, and was especially valuable during the V-1 flying bomb campaign of 1944. Mk. 5's, along with their M10 predictors and the VT proximity fuse, were able to easily hit the V-1 and shot them down in large numbers. The name AA No.3 Mk. 8 was apparently assigned to the larger SCR-545, but it does not appear this was ever used in practice.

Further development of the Glaxo concept along with improved electronics led to the "Blue Cedar" experiments, which entered service after the war as AA No. 3 Mk. 7. This was even smaller and lighter than the SCR-584, while offering better range and accuracy. The Mk. 7 was the standard AA radar from just after WWII into the late 1950s when the UK stood down its last long-range AA guns in favour of surface-to-air missiles (SAM). Blue Cedar also served as the guidance radar for the UK's first surface-to-air missile, the Brakemine.

- AA No. 3 Mark 1 - GL Mk. III(C), the Canadian-designed version of Mk. III.
- AA No. 3 Mark 2 - GL Mk. III(B), the UK-designed version of Mk. III. Sub-versions /1 through /5.
- AA No. 3 Mark 3 - Expedient portable AA radar based on the SLC electronics. Also known as "Baby Maggie".
- AA No. 3 Mark 4 - Early versions of what would become AA No. 3 Mk. 7. Also known as "GLAXO".
- AA No. 3 Mark 5 - UK name for US-built SCR-584 used from 1944 onwards.
- AA No. 3 Mark 6 - Post-war Canadian lock-follow design, not taken into service.
- AA No. 3 Mark 7 - Post-war version of AA No. 3 Mk. 4, standard AA radar into the 1960s. Also known as "Blue Cedar".
- AA No. 3 Mark 8 - UK name for US-built SCR-545, not taken into service.

== Number 4 ==
AA Number 4 was a wide collection of short and medium-range systems known as tactical control radars, whose main purpose was to provide cueing support to the AA Number 3 radars, or "putting on".

The GL Mk. III(C) was hampered by the fact that the Canadian Army did not have any early warning radar systems of their own, whereas their British counterparts had a variety of systems that could be used in this role. To address this problem, the Canadian National Research Council (NRC) took some of the ASV Mk. II radar units they had been sent and used these as the basis for a simple medium-range radar, the Zone Position Indicator, or ZPI. Although the British Army already had similar units, these tended to be larger and less mobile, so the ZPI was adopted into British service as the AA No. 4 Mk. 1. The ZPI also interfered with signals from other 1.5 m units, which were used in a wide variety of roles, so the ZPIs were used primarily on the continent. Several UK-built versions followed, the Mk. 2 and Mk. 3.

Developments in the UK led to similar medium-range systems using the magnetron in place of the 1.5 m equipment. These entered service UK as the AA No. 4 Mk. 4. Modifications of this unit to provide a plan-position indicator display allowed it to be used for medium-range tactical control, producing the Mk. 5, also known as the "Gorgonzola" due to its antenna shape. The Gorgonzola was developed for the 21st Army Group and was used in Normandy.

Similar adaptations made by the NRC in Canada led to the Microwave Zone Position Indicator, or MZPI, which also found use in the UK as the No. 4 Mk. 6. The Mk. 6 proved to be the best of all of these designs, and became the standard UK medium-range radar from the end of 1945 on. A UK-built copy was known as the Mk. 7.

- AA No. 4 Mark 1 - Canadian design rapidly developed from Air-Sea Vessel radar electronics. Widely used with GL Mk. III systems and later. Known in Canada as the Zone Position Indicator, or ZPI.
- AA No. 4 Mark 2 - UK-built versions of the Mark 1.
- AA No. 4 Mark 3 - Similar to Mark 1 and 2, but operating on aircraft interception radar frequencies. Two sub-versions, (V) which was Vehicle mounted (on a truck) and (P) which was Portable.
- AA No. 4 Mark 4 - UHF set working at 600 MHz, not taken into service.
- AA No. 4 Mark 5 - Expedient development working in the S band, only small numbers used. Also known as "Gorgonzola" due to the shape of its antenna.
- AA No. 4 Mark 6 - Canadian S band development, highly portable. Known in Canada as the Microwave Zone Position Indicator, or MZPI.
- AA No. 4 Mark 7 - UK system similar to the Mark 6 but using a cheese antenna.

Some sources state an early name for the Orange Yeoman was Mark 7, but it is more likely that would have been Mk. 8 or part of Number 5 series.

== Number 5 ==
To improve the operation of the AA system as a whole, the AA No. 5 PPI radars were used at the Anti-Aircraft Operations Rooms (AAOR) to allow them to see aircraft movements over a large area and assign gun units to particular targets. This avoided the same target being attacked by two or more gun sites. The initial Mk. 1 set was a 1.5 m band unit operating on 209 MHz, while the Mk. 2 was a microwave unit on the 10 cm band.

- AA No. 5 Mark 1 - 209 MHz (VHF)
- AA No. 5 Mark 2 - 600 MHz (UHF)

== Number 6 ==
AA Number 6 was a special-purpose system dedicated to rangefinding for light anti-aircraft guns, namely the Bofors gun. Short-range AA is a very difficult task to automate because the aircraft appear only for moments, have high crossing speeds, and are often close to the ground so clutter is a significant issue. Number 6 was designed to make a rapid line-of-sight range measurement while pointing the gun was handled manually as before. There were three entries, Mark 1 through 3, differing primarily in detail.

== Number 7 ==
AA Number 7 was part of a combined Fire Control System (FCS) for the Bofors guns. It included a rapidly scanning tactical control radar and a separate gun laying radar in a second cabin. The operator of the scanner would select targets, causing the gun laying cabin to slew onto the right bearing. The operator would then find the target, and begin a lock-follow. From then the data from the radar was sent into a predictor in the same cabin as the gun laying radar, which in turn controlled motorized systems on the guns. There were three entries, differing in detail.
