= Island Farm =

Prisoner of war camp

Coordinates: 51.4945°N 3.5855°W

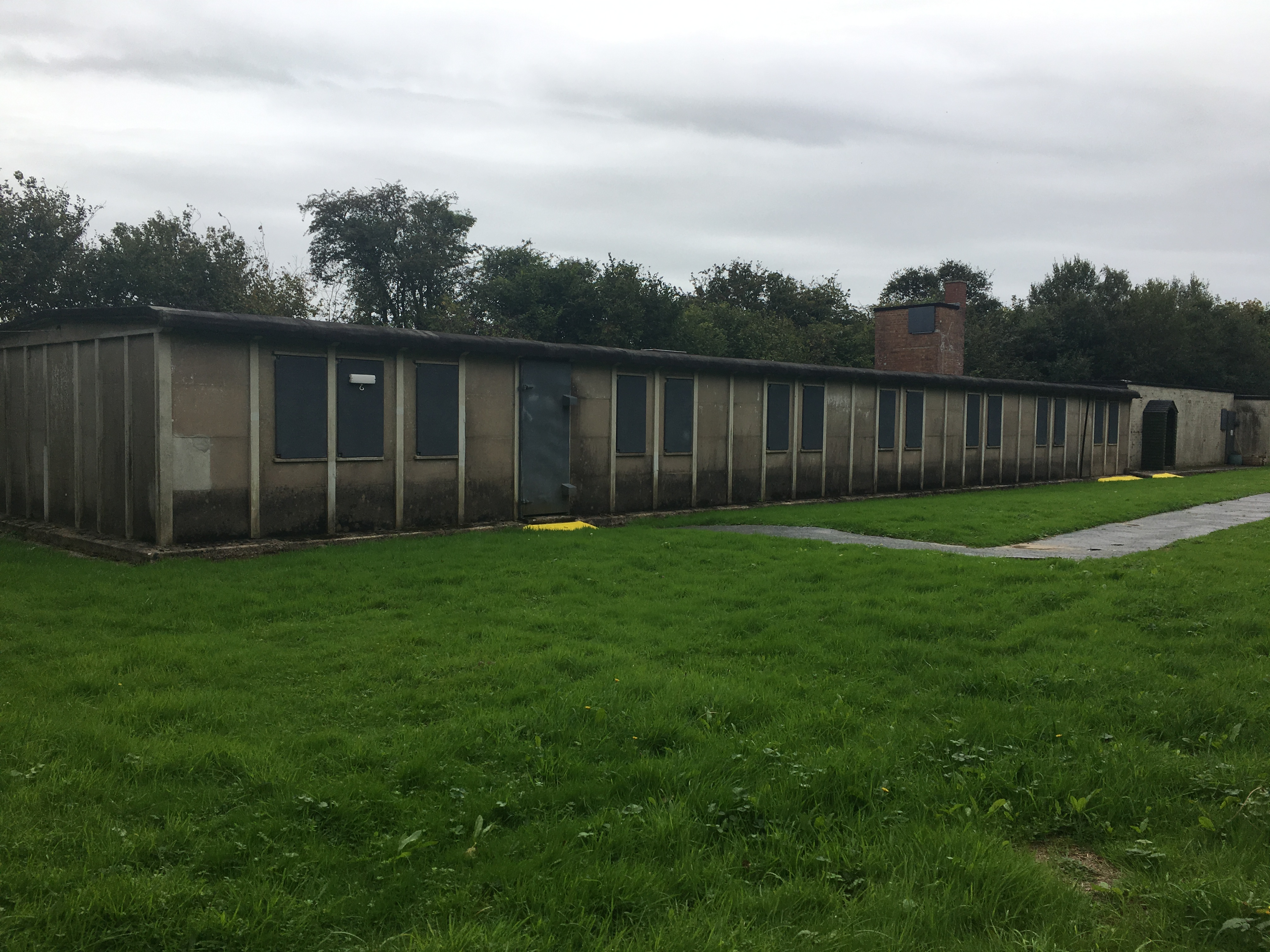
Hut 9 in 2019

Island Farm, also called Camp 198, was a prisoner of war camp on the outskirts of the town of Bridgend, South Wales. It hosted a number of Axis prisoners, mainly German, and was the scene of the largest escape attempt by German POWs in Britain during World War II. Near the end of the war it was renamed Special Camp XI and used to detain many senior SS military leaders who were awaiting extradition to the Nuremberg trials.

== Early history of the camp ==
Island Farm Camp was originally built as a hostel for female workers employed at a munitions factory in Bridgend, but conditions at the hostel were so dreary that the women preferred to travel, as much as 30 miles (48 km), from their homes each day. The camp remained empty until 1943, when it was used to accommodate American troops who would subsequently be involved in the Allied invasion of France.

After the invasion the authorities had to find suitable accommodation for large numbers of POWs captured in Europe. The prefabricated concrete huts surrounded by open fields at Island Farm were considered ideal, although the barracks had to be converted and barbed wire fences erected. This work had not been completed by the time the first batch of prisoners arrived, so the prisoners were put to work completing the conversion.

Island Farm was designated as Camp 198 and was to hold almost 2,000 prisoners. The first POWs were a mixture of Italian and German troops, but the War Office soon decided that the camp was too comfortable for enlisted men and that German officers should be held there. The first officer prisoners arrived in November 1944.

== 'The German Great Escape' ==
Soon after their arrival at Island Farm the POWs began escape efforts, with two tunnels being dug in the camp. The first was discovered in January 1945, but the second escaped detection and on 10 March 1945, 70 prisoners escaped through a tunnel dug from Hut Nine (the only hut now left standing). The tunnel was about 30 feet (9.1 m) long and breached the perimeter fence.

Some of the techniques used by the inmates were ingenious and resembled those shown in the (postwar) war film The Great Escape about Allied POWs. Excavating the tunnels was not easy because of the heavy clay soil upon which the camp was built. Cans, meat tins, and even knives from the canteen were used as digging implements. The soil was hauled out of the tunnel on a makeshift skip and put into kit bags. At first, prisoners carried the soil in their pockets to the long-jump pit or garden plots. Others kneaded clay into balls and dropped them through a hole in a false wall they had constructed in an unused room in one of the huts. To support the tunnel roof, oak benches were stolen from the canteen and bed legs were cut down when supplies of wood were depleted. A ventilation pipeline was made from condensed milk tins; air was forced through by a hand-operated fan. The tunnel even had its own electric lights, tapped off the mains supply. Noise was concealed by chorus singing.

The escapees were divided into groups, each of which was equipped with a map, homemade compass, and food. Each person in the group also had identity papers, produced in the camp. All these preparations required tremendous organization, yet it is not known who actually organized the escape. For security purposes, each escaper’s identity was known only to the others in his small group. This anonymity protected them against betrayal and prevented discovery of the full extent of the escape.

At around 10pm on March 10, the prisoners made their move; a few stole the local doctor's car and got as far as Birmingham, at least 120 miles (190 km) away, and another group got to the port of Southampton. The prisoners knew their way around through crude but accurate drawings of Wales and the surrounding area, mainly of railway lines and principal roads.

In his book, The German Great Escape, Peter Phillips claims that 84 prisoners actually got out, eclipsing the 76 Allied POWs who broke out of Stalag Luft III; the inspiration for the film The Great Escape. Fourteen were captured very soon afterwards, allowing officials to announce, for propaganda reasons, that only 70 had escaped. All the escapees were eventually recaptured, although this is also disputed by Phillips, who claims that three escapees spotted in Kent were never caught.

== After the escape ==
Only three weeks after the escape, on 31 March 1945, the authorities suddenly transferred all 1,600 officers out of Island Farm Camp. It was then designated Special Camp Eleven and was prepared to receive senior German officers, many of whom had been captured in France and were awaiting trial at Nuremberg. In all there were 160 officers holding the rank of general, admiral, or field marshal, including a number of Hitler's closest advisers:

- Field Marshal Gerd von Rundstedt, commander in chief of the German armies in the campaign against France in 1940 (because of his status, von Rundstedt received certain privileges at the camp, including his own private suite, consisting of a sitting room and bedroom).
- Field Marshal Erich von Manstein, who established the operation plans for Hitler's successful campaign in the west and commanded the Eleventh Army, which conquered the Crimea and Sevastopol on the eastern front.
- Field Marshal Walther von Brauchitsch, who was named commander in chief of the German army by Hitler in 1938 and who was instrumental in the planning and execution of attacks on Poland, the Netherlands, Belgium, France, Yugoslavia, Greece, and the Soviet Union.
- Field Marshal Paul Ludwig Ewald von Kleist, who was involved in the Battle of Paris and was in charge of Army Group A from 1942 until 1944.
- Generaloberst Heinrich von Vietinghoff, Supreme Commander of the 10th German Army in Italy, 1943 to 1945, which the Germans referred to as the Southwestern Front.
- Generaloberst Gotthard Heinrici, commander of Army Group Vistula, who defended Berlin against three Red armies in the last battle of the European theater.
- Vice-Admiral Friedrich Frisius whose garrison held out in Fortress Dunkirk until the very end of the war.

Island Farm Camp finally closed in 1948, when the last prisoners were returned to Germany.

In 2016, an archaeology investigation was undertaken of the site to look for the escape tunnel, including surface surveying using lidar and geophysics. An intrusive investigation found the tunnel to be in relatively good condition, still containing the wooden support shoring.

== Inmates of note ==
The following list is in alphabetical order:

- Hermann Behrends, SS-Gruppenführer und Generalleutnant der Polizei
- Hans-Georg Benthack, Generalmajor
- Günther Blumentritt, General der Infanterie
- Franz Böhme, General der Gebirgstruppe
- Walter Braemer, General der Kavallerie and SS-Gruppenführer
- Walther von Brauchitsch, Generalfeldmarschall
- Helmuth Brinkmann, Kriegsmarine Vizeadmiral
- Friedrich Freiherr von Broich, Generalleutnant
- Karl Brunner, SS-Brigadeführer und Generalmajor der Polizei
- Eduard Crasemann, General der Artillerie
- Walter Dornberger, Generalmajor
- Friedrich Fahnert, General der Luftnachrichtentruppe
- Alexander von Falkenhausen, General der Infanterie
- Heinz Fiebig, Generalmajor
- Hermann Franz, SS-Brigadeführer und Generalmajor der Polizei
- Friedrich Frisius, Kriegsmarine Vizeadmiral
- Walter Grabmann, Generalmajor
- Franz Halder, Generaloberst
- Wilhelm Harster, SS-Gruppenführer und Generalleutnant der Polizei
- Ludwig Heilmann, Luftwaffe Generalmajor
- Ferdinand Heim, Generalleutnant
- Gotthard Heinrici, Generaloberst
- Traugott Herr, General der Panzertruppe
- Hermann Hölter, Generalleutnant
- Friedrich Hüffmeier, Kriegsmarine Vizeadmiral
- Kurt Jahn, General der Artillerie
- Leo von Jena, SS-Gruppenführer und Generalleutnant der Waffen-SS
- Jürgen von Kamptz, SS-Obergruppenführer und General der Polizei
- Alfred Keller, Luftwaffe Generaloberst
- Heinrich Kirchheim, Generalleutnant
- Paul Ludwig Ewald von Kleist, Generalfeldmarschall
- Theodor Krancke, Kriegsmarine Admiral
- Heinrich Kreipe, Generalmajor
- Werner Lorenz, SS-Obergruppenführer und General der Waffen-SS
- Kurt Lottner, Generalmajor
- Siegfried Macholz, Generalleutnant
- Erich von Manstein, Generalfeldmarschall
- Eugen Meindl, Luftwaffe General der Fallschirmtruppe
- Herbert Olbrich, Luftwaffe Generalleutnant
- Hermann-Bernhard Ramcke, Luftwaffe General der Fallschirmtruppe
- Wilhelm Raapke, Generalleutnant
- Johann von Ravenstein, Generalleutnant
- Ernst-August Roth, Luftwaffe Generalleutnant
- Gerd von Rundstedt, Generalfeldmarschall
- Alfred Schlemm, Luftwaffe General der Fallschirmtruppe
- Artur Schmitt, Generalleutnant
- Hans-Georg von Seidel, Luftwaffe General der Flieger
- Fridolin von Senger und Etterlin, General der Panzertruppe
- Ferdinand Maria von Senger und Etterlin, Oberleutnant
- Curt Siewert, Generalleutnant
- Max Simon, SS-Gruppenführer und Generalleutnant der Waffen-SS
- Jakob Sporrenberg, SS-Gruppenführer und Generalleutnant der Polizei
- Adolf Strauss, Generaloberst
- Kurt Student, Luftwaffe Generaloberst
- Willy Tensfeld, SS-Brigadeführer und Generalmajor der Polizei
- Wilhelm Ritter von Thoma, General der Panzertruppe
- Helmut Thumm, General der Infanterie
- Kurt von Tippelskirch, General der Infanterie
- Heinrich von Vietinghoff, Generaloberst
- Hans Voss, Kriegsmarine Konteradmiral
- Otto Wagener, Generalmajor and former SA-Stabschef
- Karl Wolff, SS-Obergruppenführer und General der Waffen-SS
- Rudolf Wulf, Generalmajor

== See also ==
- List of prisoner-of-war escapes
