= Lottner =

Lottner is a German surname. It may refer to:

- Antonia Lottner (b. 1996), a German tennis player.
- Dirk Lottner (b. 1972), a German footballer and coach
- Kurt Lottner (1899–1957), a Generalmajor in the Wehrmacht during World War II.
