= Friedrich Fahnert =

German air force general

- Born: 18 January 1879; Limbach-Oberfrohna, German Empire
- Died: 10 June 1964 (aged 85); Baden-Baden, West Germany
- Military career
- Allegiance: German Empire (to 1918); Weimar Republic (to 1933); Nazi Germany
- Branch: German Imperial Army; Schutztruppe; Reichswehr; Luftwaffe
- Service years: 1910–1945
- Rank: General der Luftnachrichtentruppe
- Conflicts: Herero Rebellion; World War I World War II: Siege of Leningrad

Friedrich Hermann Fahnert (18 January 1879, in Limbach – 10 June 1964) was a German military officer who served in World War I and as a Luftwaffe general in World War II. He was the last of three officers to be appointed to the rank of General of air force communications troops.

== Military career ==
Fahnert entered the Imperial Army as an officer cadet in the 2nd railway regiment, Berlin in 1900. He took part in the campaign against the Hereros and the Nama. He served throughout World War I and became a battalion commander. After the war, he was retained in the Reichswehr and transferred to the Luftwaffe in 1936. At the outbreak of World War II, he was the commander of the Air Signals Training School in Berlin. He took part in the Siege of Leningrad. He then commanded the Air Signals Training Division in France and was promoted to General der Luftnachrichtentruppe on 1 April 1945.

== After World War II ==
On 2 May 1945, Fahnert was taken into British captivity in Lübeck and then held with other senior officers at Special Camp XI near Bridgend, South Wales until 5 December 1947. He then returned to Germany and lived in Baden-Baden until his death in 1964. A Bundeswehr barracks (Kaserne) in Karlsruhe was named after him in October 1964. In October 2016, it was renamed into "Kirchfeldkaserne".

== Awards and distinctions ==
- German Cross in Silver 7 December 1942 General Leutnant, Higher Signals Leader, Luftflotte 1
- Prussian Crown Order 4th Class with Swords
- Prussian Iron Cross 1st Class (1914) with 1939 Bar
- Prussian Iron Cross 2nd Class (1914) with 1939 Bar
- War Merit Cross 1st Class with Swords
- War Merit Cross 2nd Class with Swords
- Saxon Albert Order Knight 1st Class with Crown and Swords
- Saxon Long Service Cross
- Cross of Honour for Combatants 1914–1918
- Southwest African Expedition Medal for Combatants 1904–1906
- Armed Forces Long Service Award 1st Class (25-year Service)
- Armed Forces Long Service Award 3rd Class (12-year Service)
- Austrian Military Merit Cross 3rd Class with War Decoration
- Germany Army Pilot's Badge World War I award
- Flyer's Commemorative Badge
