= Radar, Gun Laying, Mk. I and Mk. II =

Pre-World War II British Army anti-aircraft radar

GL Mk. I
- Country of origin: UK
- Introduced: Mk. I late 1939; Mk. I* early 1941
- No. built: 410
- Type: AA direction
- Frequency: 54.5 to 85.7 MHz
- PRF: 1.5 kHz
- Pulsewidth: 3 μs
- Azimuth: ±20° from current bearing
- Precision: 50 m in range
- Power: 50 kW peak
- Other names: Radar, Anti-Aircraft No. 1, Mk. 1

GL Mk. II
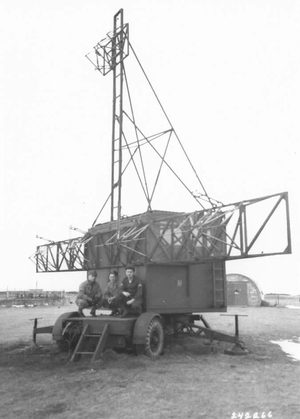
- GL Mk. II transmitter van
- Country of origin: UK
- Introduced: late 1941
- No. built: 1,679
- Type: AA direction
- Frequency: 54.5 to 85.7 MHz
- PRF: 1 to 2.5 kHz
- Pulsewidth: 1 to 1.2 μs
- Range: 50,000 yd (46 km) detection 30,000 yd (27 km) tracking 14,000 yd (13,000 m) gun direction
- Azimuth: ±20° from current bearing
- Elevation: 15–45°
- Precision: 50 m (55 yd) in range, under 0.5° directionally
- Power: 150 kW peak
- Other names: Radar, Anti-Aircraft No. 1, Mk. 2, SON-2

Radar, Gun Laying, Mark I, or GL Mk. I for short, was a pre-World War II radar system developed by the British Army to provide range information to associated anti-aircraft artillery. There were two upgrades to the same basic system, GL/EF (Elevation Finder) and GL Mk. II, both of which added the ability to accurately determine bearing and elevation of its targets. The name refers to the radar's ability to direct the guns onto a target, known as gun laying.

The first GL set was an elementary design developed from 1936 onward. Based on the early Chain Home radar's electronics, GL used separate transmitters and receivers located in wooden cabins mounted on gun carriages, each with its own antennas that had to be rotated to point at the target. The transmitted signal was quite wide, in a fan shape about 120 degrees across. This made it useful only for measuring slant range information; target bearing accuracy was approximately 20 degrees, and it could not provide any elevation information. Several were deployed with the British Expeditionary Force and at least one was captured by German forces during the Dunkirk evacuation. The subsequent German evaluation led them to believe that British radar was much less advanced than German radar.

Plans to address these shortcomings were under way even as the first Mk. I units were reaching service in 1939, but these Mk. II units would not be available until 1940 at the earliest. An expedient solution was the GL/EF attachment, which provided bearing and elevation measurements accurate to about a degree. With these improvements, the number of rounds needed to destroy an aircraft fell to 4,100, a tenfold improvement over early-war results. About 410 of the Mk. I and slightly modified Mk. I* units had been produced when production moved to the Mk. II, which had enough accuracy to directly guide the guns. Higher accuracy and simpler operation lowered the rounds-per-kill to 2,750 with Mk. II. After the German invasion of the Soviet Union in 1941, about 200 Mk. II units were supplied to the Soviets who used them under the name SON-2. By the end of the production run, 1,679 Mk. IIs had been produced.

The introduction of the cavity magnetron in 1940 led to a new design effort using highly directional parabolic antennas to allow accurate ranging and bearing measurements from much smaller antennas. These GL Mk. III radar units were produced in the UK as the Mk. IIIB and a locally designed model from Canada as the Mk. IIIC. Mk. II remained in service in secondary roles as Mk. III's replaced them at the front. Both of these were replaced by the superior SCR-584 starting in 1944.

== Development ==
=== Army Cell ===
The first mention of radar in the UK was a 1930 suggestion made by W. A. S. Butement and P. E. Pollard of the Army War Office's Signals Experimental Establishment (SEE). They proposed building a radar system for detecting ships to be used with shore batteries, and went so far as to build a low-power breadboard prototype using pulses at 50 cm wavelength (600 MHz). The War Office was uninterested and did not provide funding for further development. The matter was mentioned in the January 1931 issue of the Inventions Book of the Royal Engineers.

With the Air Ministry's successful demonstration of radar and rapid progress on the system that would become Chain Home (CH) in 1936, the Army suddenly became interested in the topic and visited the CH radar team at their new headquarters at Bawdsey Manor. Here they were introduced to smaller versions of the CH system intended for semi-mobile deployments. This appeared to have possible uses in Army roles, leading to the 16 October 1936 formation of the Military Applications Section, referred to universally as the Army Cell. This group was given room at Bawdsey, and included Butement and Pollard from the SEE.

The Cell was initially given the task of improving anti-aircraft fire, and was told that the main problem to address was the accurate measurement of range. Optical instruments were used to detect aircraft and accurately determine their bearing and elevation, but rangefinding through optical means remained difficult, slow and open to simple errors in procedure. A radar system that could provide accurate and rapid rangefinding would greatly improve the chances of successfully engaging an aircraft. They were given the goal of producing a range measure accurate to within 50 yards (46 m) at a range of 14,000 yards (13 km). In keeping with Army nomenclature, the concept was given the name "gun laying radar" due to its role in aiding gun laying (GL) of the anti-aircraft artillery.

That same year, an Airborne Group had been spun off from the main CH development team to develop a much smaller radar system suitable for mounting in large aircraft. This would become the aircraft interception radar role (AI), the intention being to detect bombers at night and allow the heavy fighters to find and attack them with their own radar. When these sets demonstrated the ability to easily pick up ships in the English Channel, the Army Cell started a second group to adopt these systems to the Coast Defence role (CD), providing both range and angle measurements with enough accuracy to blind-fire their shore batteries. This team was led by Butement, leaving Pollard as the primary developer of the gun laying systems.

=== Mk. I development ===
The GL effort was started very early during Chain Home development, and was deliberately based on as much of its technology as possible. Unlike Butement's earlier experimental systems, CH was based on existing electronics from commercial shortwave radio systems, as these were among the highest power radio systems. The downside of this approach was that radio antennas generally have to be a significant fraction of the radio signal's wavelength to work with reasonable gain, the half-wave dipole being a common type. For the 50 metre wavelengths initially used by CH, antennas on the order of 25 m (82 ft) would be needed. (Note: Antennas are generally designed to be resonant at the target frequency, which requires it to be some multiple of 1/2 of the wavelength. A full treatment is found in the ARRL Antenna Book.)

This was not practical for any sort of mobile system, but as newer electronics arrived through the late 1930s, the wavelengths being used by the radar systems continued to drop. By the time GL was ready to begin testing, the system was able to operate at wavelengths between 3.4 and 5.5 m (11 and 18 ft) reducing the antenna size to a more manageable several-metre length. Similar changes in electronics also produced smaller versions of CH, the Mobile Radio Units or MRU's, which were used both as a mobile early-warning system and a backup service in case a main CH station was knocked out.

CH-type radar displays use a time base generator to produce a sawtooth wave voltage that is fed to one of the inputs of a cathode ray tube (CRT). The time base is calibrated to move the CRT dot across the screen in the same time that echoes would be returned from objects at the radar's maximum range. The dot moves so rapidly that it looks like a solid line. The return signal is amplified and then sent into the CRT's other channel, typically the Y-axis, causing the spot to deflect away from the straight line being created by the time base. For small objects, like aircraft, the deflection causes a small blip to appear on the display. The range to the target can be measured by comparing the location of the blip to a calibrated scale on the display.

The accuracy of such a display is relative to the size of the tube and the range of the radar. If one might be expected to measure the blip to an accuracy of 1 mm on the scale along a typical 3-inch (76 mm) CRT, and that radar has a maximum range of 14,000 yards, then that 1 mm represents 14000 / (75 / 1), just over 186 yards (170 m). This was far less accuracy than desired, which was about 50 yards (46 m).

To provide a system able to make such an accurate measurement, and do so continually, Pollard developed a system that used the entire CRT display to provide a measurement showing only ranges a short distance on either side of a pre-selected range setting. The system worked by charging a capacitor at a known rate until it reached a threshold that triggered the time base. The time base was set to move across the screen in a time that represented less than a kilometre. A large potentiometer was used to control the charging rate, which provided a range offset. The range to the target was measured by using the potentiometer to move the blip until it was in the middle of the display, and then reading the range from a scale on the potentiometer. The basic system developed rapidly, and a test system was providing 100 yards (91 m) accuracy for aircraft between 3,000 yards (2,700 m) and 14,000 yards (13 km) by the summer of 1937. By the end of the year, this had improved to as accurate as 25 yards (23 m).

As the original requirement for the system was to provide additional information to optical instruments, accurate bearing measurements were not required. The system did need some way to ensure that the target being ranged was the one being tracked optically, and not another nearby target. For this role, the system used two receiver antennas mounted about one wavelength apart vertically, so that when they were pointed directly at the target the received signals would cancel out and produce a null on the display, where the signal disappeared. This was sent to a second display, whose operator attempted to keep the antennas pointed at the target.

The transmitter, which produced short pulses of about 20 kW, was mounted in a large rectangular wooden cabin on a wheeled trailer. The single half-wave dipole antenna was mounted on a short vertical extension at one end of the cabin, with the "line-of-shoot" along the long axis. The antenna was only marginally directional, sending the signal out in a fan shape about 60 degrees on either side.

The receiver was considerably more complex. The operator's cabin was somewhat smaller than the transmitter, and mounted on the AA gun carriage bearing system which allowed the entire cabin to be rotated around the vertical axis. A short distance above the roof was a rectangular metal framework roughly matching the outline of the cabin. Three antennas were mounted in a line down one of the long sides of the framework; range measurements were taken off the antenna in the middle, and directionally by comparing the signal on the two antennas at the ends. Behind the two bearing antennas were reflectors mounted about a wavelength away, which had the effect of narrowing their reception angle.

In the field, the transmitter would be aimed in the expected direction of attacks, and the receiver placed some distance away to help protect it from the signal being reflected off local sources.

=== Initial deployment ===
By 1939 the team was happy enough with the state of the equipment that production contracts were sent out. Metropolitan-Vickers won the contract for the transmitter, and A. C. Cossor the receiver. Mass-producing the GL set did not prove particularly difficult, and by the end of 1939, 59 complete systems had been delivered. Another 344 would be completed during 1940.

The system did exactly what had been asked of it; it provided range measurements with accuracy on the order of 50 yards. In the field it became clear that this was not enough. By late 1939 the spectre of night bombing was a major concern, and as the GL system could not provide accurate bearing information, and no elevation, it was unable to direct the guns at night. Instead the World War I style of operation was used, with searchlights hunting for targets largely at random, and conventional optical instruments being used to determine bearing and elevation once a target was lit up. In practice this proved just as ineffective as it had during World War I. (Note: As bystanders noted, the "searchlight beams swung wildly about the sky but rarely found and held a target.")

Despite spending considerable time, effort and money on the GL system, when The Blitz opened the entire Army air defence system proved to be ineffective. General Frederick Pile, commander of the Army's Anti-Aircraft Command, put it this way:

The teething troubles with the radar were enormous. By the beginning of October 1940 we had not succeeded in firing a single round at night. It was bitterly disappointing – we got the sets rigged up in wonderful time, but then we had the greatest difficulty in calibrating them. Every plan we made broke down and always from causes beyond our power to deal with.

For detecting the targets, GL was largely ineffective. From a mechanical standpoint, the need to swing the entire system around for tracking presented a major problem. A more serious limitation was the displays, which showed only a small portion of the sky in the range display, and a single on-target/off-target indication in bearing. Although it might be possible to swing the antenna in bearing to find a target, the direction was accurate to only 20 degrees, enough to keep the antennas aligned with the target, but of little use directing optical instruments onto a target, especially at night. Additionally, the bearing display only showed whether the antennas were aligned or not, but not to which side the target lay if they were mis-aligned, so more work was required to determine which direction to turn the antenna for tracking.

In addition to these problems, the wide fan-shaped signal presented serious problems when more than one aircraft entered the beam. In this case, multiple blips would appear on both the range and bearing displays and it was impossible to tell which was from which target. Even the most experienced crews were unable to satisfactorily track a target in these conditions.

=== Radar at Dunkirk ===
GL Mk. I sets were deployed with the British Expeditionary Force, along with the MRU systems which provided early warning. Following the collapse of the defences and the eventual Dunkirk evacuation, these sets had to be abandoned in France.

There were enough parts left behind for Wolfgang Martini's radar team to piece together the design and determine the basic operational capabilities of the systems. What they found did not impress them. Luftwaffe radars for both early warning (Freya) and gun-laying (Würzburg) were significantly more advanced than their British counterparts at that time, operating on much shorter wavelengths around 50 cm.

This evaluation, combined with the failure of a mission of the German airship LZ 130 Graf Zeppelin to detect British radars in August 1939, appears to have led to a general underestimation of the usefulness of the British radar systems. Despite being aware of Chain Home, German reports on the state of the Royal Air Force written just before the Battle of Britain did not even mention radar at all. Other reports mention it, but do not consider it to be very important. Other sections of the Luftwaffe appear to have been dismissive of the system as a whole.

=== Mk. II development ===
The GL team had already started plans for a greatly improved version of the system that could also provide accurate bearing and elevation information. They had always wanted the GL system to be able to direct the guns in all measurements, but the pressing need to get the system into the field as soon as possible precluded this.

To add this capability, they adapted a concept from the Coast Defence radars being developed by Butement. The idea was to use two antennas aimed in slightly different directions, with their sensitive areas, or lobes, slightly overlapping down the centreline of the two. The result is a reception pattern where each of the antennas produces a maximum signal when the target is slightly to one side of the centreline, while a target located exactly in the middle produces a slightly smaller but equal signal on both antennas. A switch is used to alternate the signals between the two antennas, sending them to the same receiver, amplifier and CRT. One of the signals is also sent through a delay, so its blip is drawn slightly offset.

The result is a display similar to CH, showing the range to targets within view, but with each of the targets producing two closely spaced blips. By comparing the length of the blips, the operator can tell which antenna is more directly pointed at the target. By rotating the antennas towards the stronger signal, the longer blip, the target will be centred and the two blips will become equal length. Even with the relatively long wavelengths used, accuracies on the order of ½ a degree could be attained with these lobe switching systems.

=== Mk. I* ===
As Mk. I arrived in the field, several improvements in the basic electronics were introduced. These were collected together to form the Mk. I* version. The differences between the Mk. I and Mk. I* were primarily in details. In Mk. I, the displays in the receiver van were triggered by the reception of the transmitted signal on a small antenna. It was found that in certain orientations of the transmitter and receiver, the antenna would receive too little signal to work. This was replaced by a cable between the two cabins, which was known as cable locking. Certain details of the RF stages on the receiver improved signal-to-noise ratio, a voltage regulator was added to correct for differences in generators, and a new system was introduced that replaced the complex grounding system for the potentiometer with an electronic version. A more major change was the introduction of anti-jamming features. (Note: Unfortunately, none of the available sources detail precisely what these anti-jamming features were.)

=== Bedford Attachment ===
By late 1939, it became clear that the Mk. I in its current form would not be entirely useful in the field, especially at night, and that it would be until at least early 1941 before the Mk. II was available. Leslie Bedford had formed a radar development department at Cossor to produce CH receivers and was well acquainted with both the desires of the AA gunners as well as the possibilities inherent to the radar systems. He suggested that it would be relatively easy to adapt the antenna and display systems from the Mk. II to the Mk. I system, providing many of the same advantages.

The result was the GL/EF, for Gun Laying/Elevation Finder, although it was referred to almost universally as the "Bedford Attachment". (Note: One wartime user of the system refers to it as the Bedford Bastard.) This modification added a set of vertical antennas and a new elevation-measuring CRT to read them, along with a radiogoniometer that allowed the vertical angle to be accurately measured. Mk. I*'s with GL/EF began to deploy in early 1941, just as The Blitz was reaching a crescendo.

With the Bedford Attachment, the system provided all of the information needed to aim the guns based on the radar alone. As all three axes could be read continually, the predictors could be fed information directly from the radar with no optical inputs needed. Likewise, the guns themselves were either automatically driven from the predictor, or 'laid', or alternately required the layers to follow mechanical pointers to match the predictor output, a concept known as 'laying needle on needle'. Even the fuse settings were automatically set from the range values coming from the radar. The entire gunnery problem was now highly automated.

=== Calibration problems ===
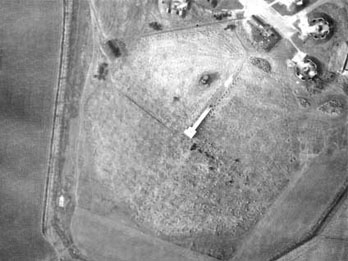
Aerial photo of a gun laying mat installed on the east coast, north of Sunderland. The ramp and platform at the centre are prominent.

It was at this point that serious problems with calibration appeared. After considerable study, using reflectors hung from balloons and testing against the occasional aircraft, it became clear that the main problem was the levelling of the ground around the station. The long wavelengths used in these early radars strongly reflected off the ground and back into the sky. These reflected signals sometimes reached the targets and were returned to the receiver, along with the signal directly from the transmitter. Interference between the two caused nulls to appear in the reception pattern, which today is known as multipath propagation. This made it difficult to find the target as the antennas rotated to follow a target, which caused it to appear and disappear on the displays.

At first, it was believed that this would not be a serious problem and that it could be addressed by developing a calibration table for each site. For instance, along one direction the ground might be slightly lower and create a particular pattern of nulls in the air when pointed in that direction, while in another direction the ground might be higher and make a different pattern. In theory, one could measure this pattern and produce a table for any azimuth angle. Unfortunately, even the very first tests demonstrated that the calibration changed with wavelength, which happened when one radar underwent maintenance or was replaced by a backup. This meant that they would either have to make multiple calibration tables, one for each radar, or that if a single table of corrections for different bearings was desired, the antennas would have to be moved vertically as the wavelength was changed to adjust for this. Neither was practical.

Once again, it was Bedford who suggested a solution; instead of calibrating the radar, he suggested calibrating the ground itself, flattening the area around the station through the use of a metal wire mat. This way, the pattern would remain the same as the radar rotated or changed frequencies. Designing such a system fell to Nevill Mott, a physicist who had recently joined the Army Cell. The proper dimensions were ultimately found to be a 130-yard (120 m) diameter octagon of 2-inch (5.1 cm) square wire mesh. This was supported in the air by hundreds of tensioned wires running over wooden stakes about 5 feet (1.5 m) in the air. To get the proper clearance between the antenna and the wire ground mat, the radar system had to be raised into the air on blocks, and was accessed via a wooden catwalk above the mat.

The effort to equip UK-based GL sets with these ground mats was enormous. Each mat consumed 230 rolls of wire mesh, each one 4 feet (1.2 m) wide by 50 yards (46 m) long. In total they covered an area of about 15,000 square yards (13,000 m^{2}) and used up 650 miles (1,050 km) of wire – along with another 10 miles (16 km) of heavier wire used in the support structure below the mesh. They initially planned to install the mats at 101 sites immediately, but by December 1940 they had consumed over 1,000 miles (1,600 km) of galvanized wire, using up the entire nation's supply of the material and causing a countrywide shortage of chicken wire.

Construction of the mat took about 50 men four weeks to complete. By the end of January 1941 only 10 sites had been upgraded, and all the while new AA emplacements were being set up so that the number of prospective sites was increasing more rapidly than they could be completed. By April, Pile had concluded that 95% of the AA sites would need the mats, and they expected 600 sites to be operational by March 1942. The program ultimately ran on for years, petering out as new systems were introduced that did not require the mats. The mat program formally ended in March 1943.

Another problem, never wholly solved, was that any balloon barrage in the area would form a powerful reflector rendering anything behind it invisible. This was particularly annoying as the balloons were often placed near the AA guns as the two systems were used together to protect high-value targets. A solution was considered in the form of a system that would allow low-lying reflections to be eliminated, but this was not fully developed.

=== Dramatic results ===
In addition to the continued technological advancement of the GL systems, Pile greatly improved the overall state of AA starting in September 1940 by appointing a scientific advisor to the highest echelon of the AA command. For this role he chose Patrick Blackett, who had World War I experience in the Royal Navy and had since demonstrated considerable mathematical ability. Blackett planned to study the AA problem from a purely mathematical standpoint, a concept that proved extremely valuable in other areas of air defence, and would ultimately develop into the general field of operational research.

Blackett formed a study group known as the Anti-Aircraft Command Research Group, but universally referred to as "Blackett's Circus". Blackett deliberately chose members from different backgrounds, including physiologists David Keynes Hill, Andrew Huxley and Leonard Ernest Bayliss, mathematical physicists Arthur Porter and Frank Nabarro, astrophysicist Hugh Ernest Butler, surveyor G. Raybould, physicist I. Evans and mathematicians A. J. Skinner and M. Keast, the only woman on the team. Their goals were neatly summed up by Blackett:

...the first task was to work out the best method of plotting the [radar] data and predicting the future enemy position for the use of the guns on the basis only of pencil and paper, range and fuse tables. The second task was to assist in the design of simple forms of plotting machines which would be manufactured in a few weeks. The third stage was to find means of bringing the existing predictors into use in connection with radar sets.

Meanwhile, in November 1940, John Ashworth Ratcliffe was moved from the Air Ministry side of Bawdsey to start an AA gunnery school at Petersham on the west side of London. One problem that became immediately evident was that the inputs to the predictors, the analog computers that handled ballistics calculations, were very easy to get wrong. This information was fed back through the Army hierarchy, and again it was Leslie Bedford who produced the solution. This resulted in the building of several Trainers that were used at the AA school, allowing operators to hone their skills.

The Circus soon added a fourth trailer to some AA sites in the London area, dedicated solely to recording the inputs to the predictors, the numbers of rounds fired, and the results. These numbers were fed back through the AA command structure to look for any chance of improvement. The official history, published just after the war, noted that between September and October 1940, 260,000 AA rounds had been fired with the result of 14 aircraft destroyed, a rate of 18,500 rounds-per-kill. This was already a great improvement over pre-radar statistics which were 41,000 rounds per kill. But with the addition of GL/EF, GL mats and better doctrine, this fell to 4,100 rounds per kill by 1941.

Pile commented on the improvements by noting:

The initial difficulties had largely been smoothed away, and on May 11–12 [1941], when the raids were so widespread that we were given greater scope, we obtained 9 victims, with one probable and no fewer than 17 others damaged. [...] the Blitz virtually ended that night. By the end of the Blitz, we had destroyed 170 night raiders, probably destroyed another 58, and damaged, in varying degree, 118 more.

=== Mk. II arrives ===
Production of the Mk. II was by the Gramophone Company and Cossor. Prototype Mk. II sets began to appear as early as June 1940, but considerable changes were worked into the design as more information from the Mk. I sets flowed in. The final design began to arrive in production quantities in early 1941.

Displays were located in a wooden cabin below the receiver array, including separate CRTs for range, bearing and elevation, allowing continual tracking throughout the engagement. The transmitter antenna now came in two versions, one with a wide angle beam for initially picking up the target or searching for it, and another with a much narrower beam that was used while tracking a single target. Although this introduced complexity, it also greatly reduced the problem of more than one target appearing on the displays.

The Mk. II also included a new transmitter, which had increased in power by a factor of three, from 50 to 150 kW. This extra power offered somewhat better range, but more importantly it allowed the pulse width to be significantly reduced while offering the same range. The sharpness of the echo is a function of the pulse width, so by reducing it the system became more accurate. The Mk. II could offer bearing measurements as accurate as ½ degree, about twice as accurate as the Mk. I*, and just within the range needed to directly aim the guns. The Mk. II had largely replaced the Mk. I* by mid-1942 and remained in service until 1943. An analysis demonstrated that the Mk. II improved the rounds-per-kill to 2,750, another significant advance. 1,679 GL Mark II sets were produced between June 1940 and August 1943.

=== Mk. III development ===
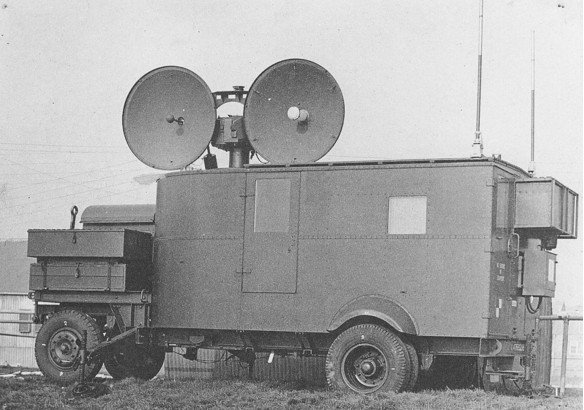
The GL Mk. III B was much smaller and far more mobile than the Mk. II it replaced.

The introduction of the cavity magnetron in 1940 allowed radars to operate effectively at much shorter microwave wavelengths than was possible with earlier vacuum tube designs. The early magnetrons operated at a wavelength of around 9 centimetres (3.5 in), which reduced the dipole antennas to only a few centimetres long. The antennas were so short that they could be placed in front of parabolic reflectors, which focused the signal into a very tight beam. Instead of the broadcast pattern being as much as 150 degrees wide, typical microwave designs might have a beam width of perhaps 5 degrees. Using a technique known as conical scanning, a rotating version of lobe switching, this could be further reduced to well under ½ a degree, more than enough to directly lay the guns.

In late 1940 the Army was well into an effort to build a microwave-frequency GL radar system, and by 1942 had already sent the plans to companies in the UK for production. Work also began in Canada in 1940 on an entirely Canadian-designed and built version with production starting in September 1942, and deliveries arriving in the UK starting in November 1942, as the GL Mk. IIIC, with British units arriving the next month as the Mk. IIIB. These were dramatically more mobile than the earlier Mk. I and Mk. II designs, consisting of two-wheeled trailers and a generator set.

Because the antennas were so much more directional than the wide, fan-shaped beams of the earlier systems, the entire problem with ground reflections could be avoided by ensuring the antennas were always pointed a few degrees above the horizon. This meant none of the signal bounced off the ground on transmission, and that any nearby reflections of the returned signal would also not be seen. The need for the wire ground mat of the earlier models was eliminated, and sites could be unlimbered and fully operational in hours.

The new microwave sets began replacing the Mk. II during 1943, but deliveries were not particularly fast and these sets were often sent to new units as opposed to replacing Mk. II's in the field. The 1944 arrival of the US SCR-584 radar was the catalyst for the rapid replacement of all of these sets, as it combined scanning and tracking into a single unit with an internal generator set. In the immediate post-war era, these were in turn replaced by the smaller and lighter AA No. 3 Mk. 7 radar, which remained in use until AA guns were removed from service in the late 1950s.

== Description ==
=== Basic design ===
The Mk. I used two antennas, one for transmission and one for reception. Both were built on top of wooden cabins, similar in construction to a travel trailer, that contained the respective electronics. These were built by railway carriage makers like Metro-Cammell, where wood was still a common building material. The cabins were mounted on large bearing plates that allowed the entire assembly to rotate to track targets. These were, in turn, mounted on anti-aircraft artillery carriages for mobility. A generator set was placed between the two and provided power to both.

The transmitter system on the Mk. I produced 3 microsecond long pulses of up to 50 kW peak power 1,500 times a second. These were broadcast semi-directionally, floodlighting the entire area in front of the transmitter antenna's "line of shoot" in front of the cabin. The antenna was arranged so that the signal was spread out vertically more than horizontally, so a significant amount of the signal hit the ground. Due to the long wavelengths used, this signal was strongly reflected forward, and due to geometrical considerations, any signal hitting the ground near the station would reflect with enough of a vertical angle to mix with the main signal in the area of interest (about 30 kilometres (19 mi) around the station). This was the purpose of the GL mat, which did not eliminate the reflections, but made them much more predictable.

The separate range and bearing receiver units could operate on several frequency bands. A common oscillator was used by both receivers, which was sent into the four-tube radio frequency (RF) section. The frequency of the oscillator could be switched between two broad bands, LF band from 54.5 to 66.7 MHz, and the HF band from 66.7 to 84.0 MHz. (Note: Although referred to as HF and LF in the documentation, these terms are being used as relative measures to each other, not the common radio band names. All of the frequencies are well within the VHF band. The more common definition of LF is in the kHz range.) The receivers were then fine-tuned using conventional rotating iron cores, which were mechanically connected to tune both receivers from a single dial. To correct for slight differences in the two receivers, the output of one of the cores could be adjusted by sliding a copper ring along a post. To ensure that the signal would not reflect off of one of the RF stages, the range receiver added a buffer circuit at the end of RF stage.

=== Displays and interpretation ===
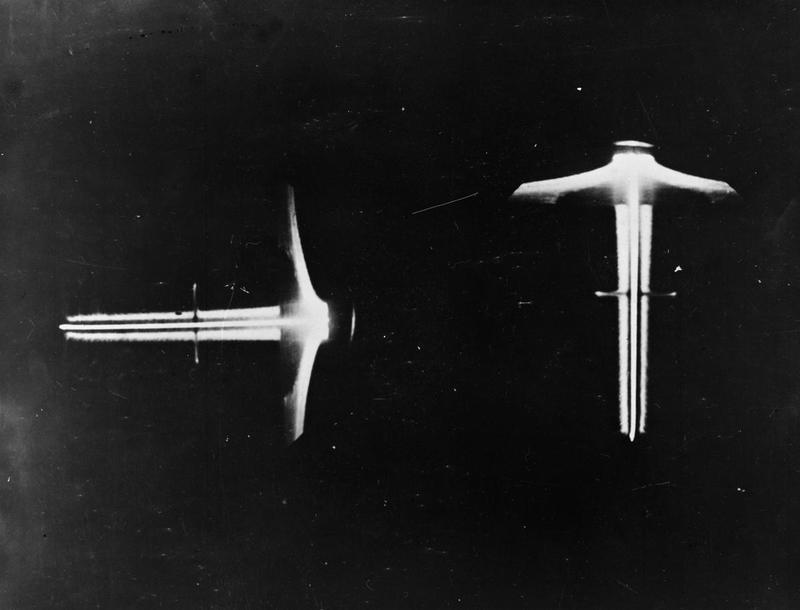
This image from an AI Mk. IV radar is similar in concept to the GL Mk. II, although it displays blips on either side of a centreline rather than as two peaks on one side. The blips are just visible about half-way along the baseline. The large triangles at the top and right are caused by ground reflections, and are not present in GL systems.

The range signal was received on a single half-wave dipole mounted at the middle of the horizontal antenna array, fed into a four-tube RF receiver, and then into a four-tube intermediate frequency (IF) system. The output was fed directly into the lower Y-axis plate of one of the two CRTs. The upper plate on the Y-axis was fed the output of a calibrator, allowing it to be adjusted so the beam was centred vertically. Signals being received from the antenna would thus cause the beam to deflect downward to produce a blip, as in Chain Home.

The X-axis of the system was fed by a time base generator that pulled the beam from left to right across the screen. Normally a time base is triggered to start its sweep as soon as the signal from the transmitter is seen, but as noted above, this would not provide the accuracy required for this role. Instead, the time base was set to span the screen at a much faster rate, representing only a portion of the signal's overall flight time. Triggering the time base was accomplished using a very accurate oil-filled potentiometer which exponentially increased the charge in a capacitor bank until it reached a trigger value. A very complex grounding system was needed to ensure the accuracy of the voltages leaving the potentiometer system, as any stray voltages could overwhelm the signal.

There were two operators of the measurement displays. To make a range measurement, the range operator would turn the potentiometer dial in an effort to get the leading edge of the target blip to line up with a vertical line on the CRT. The range was not read off the CRT, but the dial. The dial also turned a magslip, or selsyn as it is more commonly known today. The output of the magslip was used to directly turn the controls on the predictor, allowing the radar to continually update the range measurement.

The bearing measurement was received on a separate receiver and antenna system. In this case, two half-wave dipoles were used, located about one wavelength apart horizontally on the antenna framework. Both antennas were connected together electrically before entering the receivers, with the outputs of one of them inverted. This meant that the output signal would drop to zero when the antennas were precisely aligned with the target. Any mis-alignment changed the relative phase of the signals slightly, producing a net signal that entered the receiver and produced a display. However, it was not possible to know which of the two antennas was the one producing the net output; the system provided an indication of when the antenna was on-target, but not which side to turn to when it was off-target.

The bearing receiver was otherwise identical to the range version, and fed into the CRT in the same fashion. A slower time base generator was used, triggered by the same signal as the first, but set to scan much more slowly. In this case the time base was not used to measure range, and the horizontal location of the blip was not important. Instead, the time base was used to help ensure the bearing operator was looking at the same target as the range operator – the signal of interest would be somewhere close to centred. The bearing operator would then turn the entire receiver cabin using a gear set connected to bicycle pedals, looking for the point when the signal disappeared, indicating that the target was now perfectly aligned between the two antennas. This null-seeking system was often used as it more sharply indicates locations; maximum signals tend to be spread out. If the target was not aligned, the presence of the signal could not indicate which direction to turn. To address this, an electrical switching system on the antenna feeds allowed them to be connected together in different phases, and by studying the way the blip changed as the switch was turned, the operator could determine which antenna was closer to the target, a process known as bracketing. The phasing system had been introduced by E.C. Slow, and became known as the Slowcock.

=== GL/EF ===
Overall the GL/EF equipped systems were similar to the Mk. I, but added another set of antennas positioned vertically along a ladder projecting from the top of the receiver cabin. The original range antenna was mounted at the bottom of the ladder, with two new antennas equally spaced out along it. The antennas were spaced by about half a wavelength, so the signals would interfere constructively on one pair and destructively on the other. A radiogoniometer was used to change the relative sensitivity of the upper pair of antennas, and the outputs of the radiogoniometer and range antenna were sent to separate pre-amplifiers.

To complete the system, an electronic switch was added that was timed to the 50 Hz signal of the National Grid. The signal was used to switch the input to the receivers from the range antenna, to output of the other two antennas mixed through the radiogoniometer. The same signal also adjusted the Y-axis bias of the CRT slightly, so that alternate traces appeared above or below the centre of a new CRT dedicated for elevation measurements. The result was that the upper trace contained the original range signal as before, while the lower trace contained the radiogoniometer output; by looking along the lower trace under the range blip, the operator could turn the radiogoniometer until the signal reached a null, revealing the angle. The operator would periodically adjust the setting as the lower blip re-appeared while the target moved.

As the system was being developed, a further improvement was introduced that allowed for continuous following as opposed to periodic re-setting. The switching system was modified such that the range was sent to the upper line for 2.5 milliseconds (ms), and the range and radiogoniometer signals for 7.5 ms. If the signal was properly nulled, the two upper signals would mix and produce a single bright blip on the upper trace, while the lower trace would be nulled, as before. If the signal was not nulled, a faint second blip would appear to smear out the upper trace, noticeable even before the blip on the lower trace became visible.

In testing, it was found that the faint range-only signal became hard to see when the signal was noisy and jumping about. A final change added a slight fixed delay to the range-only signal, causing its trace to shift to the right. Now three distinct blips appeared on the elevation display, the range blip on the right, and the two elevation signals aligned vertically just to the left.

A common problem with antenna systems of this sort is that it is not possible to know if the signal is being received by the front or back of the antenna, which are equally sensitive. To address this, once a null was seen, the bearing operator turned on a sensing switch which connected a second antenna located slightly behind the main one. The mixed output of the two clearly indicated which side the target lay on, front or rear. However, this led to problems in the phasing systems that were never wholly cured. (Note: According to the note on the BBC site, the switch was a bar of metal that shorted out the two halves of the dipole.)

=== Mk. II ===
The Mk. II transmitter system consisted of four horizontal dipoles along the truss work and a fifth mounted on the ladder-like support on top. The antenna elements are L-shaped, a modification that is not explained in existing sources.

The receiver used several dipole receivers and compared the signal between them to determine location. Later models would generally include IFF Mark III receivers on top of the cabin, consisting of two Yagi antennas.

The Mk. II system was very similar to the Mk. I* with GL/EF, although some detail cleanups improved range and accuracy. These included a more powerful transmitter, updated receiver electronics, and the reduction in pulse width to allow more accurate measurements. A more major difference was the method used to produce the split-traces on the displays. Unlike the electronic system used on GL/EF, Mk. II used a mechanical and motorized system that Bedford considered less advanced. The basic idea was to use two antennas that are aimed in slightly different directions, and whose reception patterns overlap in the middle. By comparing the signal strength between the two, the operator could determine if the target was more centred on one of the antennas, and rotate them until both signals were of equal strength. This system had been widely used in RAF AI and ASV radars even while Mk. I was being developed, but in order to get Mk. I into service the system was not included in its design. Mk. II was, effectively, an effort to adapt these displays to the GL set.

Unlike the GL/EF display, the Mk. II used a single receiver for each pair of antennas. The switch rapidly alternated one or the other signal into the receiver. It also sent one of the signals through a short delay line. It did not, however, move the Y-axis baseline. The result was a single trace along the centre of the display, with two slightly separated blips, one from each antenna. By comparing the relative lengths of the two blips, the operator could determine which antenna was more closely aligned with the target, and continue to rotate it until the blips were equal length.

The RAF's airborne systems moved the antennas by moving the entire aircraft. In the case of GL, the bearing angle was already movable through the use of the rotating cabin. The upper antenna of the vertical pair was able to be moved up and down the ladder-like extension, causing the lobe pattern to shift and thus allow the altitude angle to be measured.

Another problem addressed in the Mk. II was one of the signals being so wide that multiple aircraft would appear on the display. This was solved by adding a second transmission antenna system. One had a fairly narrow horizontal antenna spread, which caused the transmission to be similar to the Mk. I's 20 degrees. The other had a much wider antenna array, narrowing the pattern and making it much easier to pick out individual targets. The wide-pattern antenna would be used during the initial search, and once a target was selected a switch was thrown to move the transmission to the narrow beam. Images exist that show both antennas combined on a single cabin.

Mk. II also added a simple but effective calibration device, a shaft connected to the elevation control that extended outside the cabin. For calibration, the elevation handle would be turned to zero and a telescope connected to the shaft so it pointed at the horizon. Then a balloon would be lofted and tracked by the radar, with corrections being read off through the telescope.
