= Friedrich Frisius =

WWII German admiral (1895-1970)

- Born: 17 January 1895; Bad Salzuflen
- Died: 30 August 1970 (aged 75); Lingen
- Military career
- Allegiance: Nazi Germany
- Branch: Kriegsmarine
- Service years: 1913–45
- Rank: Vizeadmiral
- Commands: Fortress commander Dunkirk
- Awards: German Cross in Gold

Friedrich Frisius (17 January 1895 – 30 August 1970) was a German naval commander of World War II.

== Life ==
=== Pre WWII ===
Born in 1895 in Bad Salzuflen, son of the Lutheran pastor Karl Friedrich Wilhelm Frisius and his wife Karoline Luise Antoinette, Frisius entered the German Navy as a cadet in 1913 and was trained on the protected cruiser Victoria Louise just before the outbreak of the First World War. During the war he put in service on torpedo boats and cruisers and was promoted to Lieutenant, and in the inter-war period he commanded a torpedo boat as well as an assignment from 1919 to 1923 on the Baltic coastal defences, maintaining law and order in Germany itself and putting down Communist uprisings. He also joined the Abwehr's Foreign Department at the Reich Defence Ministry from 1929 to 1931 and from 1935 onwards (with a break to command two ships and for a role at the Naval Academy Mürwik).

=== WWII ===
Handbill thrown from Allied aircraft over the German positions in Dunkirk, April or early May 1945: WARNUNG ! An die deutschen Truppen in DÜNKIRCHEN ! Eure letzte Gelegenheit, Euch der Heeresgruppe Montgomery anzuschliessen, ist bald vorüber. Zeigt weisse Fahnen über Euren Stellungen ! Zur Besprechung der Übergabe wird Admiral Frisius oder ein beglaubigter Vertreter durch die alliierten Linien gelassen. ZG 130 (To the German troops in Dunkirk! Your last opportunity to join Army Group Montgomery will soon be over. Show white flags over your positions! Admiral Frisius will be used to discuss the handover.)

By 1939 he was a staff-officer of the Hamburg Kriegsmarine Service Centre (one of the other Kriegsmarinedienststellen, which were responsible for troop movements and the use of merchant shipping for the war office), and later moved to the Boulogne Service Centre. He remained in the area as commander of the Boulogne's coastal defences, from 26 January 1941 onwards. From 16 December 1941 to 28 October 1944, he took over command of the defences of the whole Pas de Calais, though these were non-existent by 15 September 1944, when he was moved to command the Fortress of Dunkirk (Festung Duenkirchen). He was in command of German forces there throughout its long siege in 1944-45 (being promoted to Vizeadmiral [vice admiral] on 30 September 1944) and signed its unconditional surrender at the end of the war. He was held as a POW at Island Farm, the Special Camp 11 at Bridgend, from then until his release on 6 October 1947.

=== Post-war and legacy ===
Frisius died in Lingen in 1970.

Frisius is best remembered for his tenacious and effective defense of Dunkirk. Against a background of accelerating strategic collapse by the Germans, he maintained a level of morale and effectiveness in his troops resembling that of the much more capable pre-1943 Wehrmacht. The last German offensive operation in France was Frisius's counterattack against the encircling Allied troops on the dawn of the 5 April 1945; while ultimately unsuccessful, it was strong enough to cause the Allies significant difficulties at the time. Dunkirk held out until 4 May 1945, just days before the general German surrender, and did not formally capitulate until the 9th.

== Awards and decorations ==
- Iron Cross (1914) 2nd and 1st Class
- Clasp to the Iron Cross (1939) 2nd and 1st Class
- German Cross in Gold (16 September 1944)
- Marineartillerie-Kriegsabz (30 September 1944) Festung Duenkirchen
