= GL Mk. III radar =

Family of British radar systems for artillery

GL Mk. III
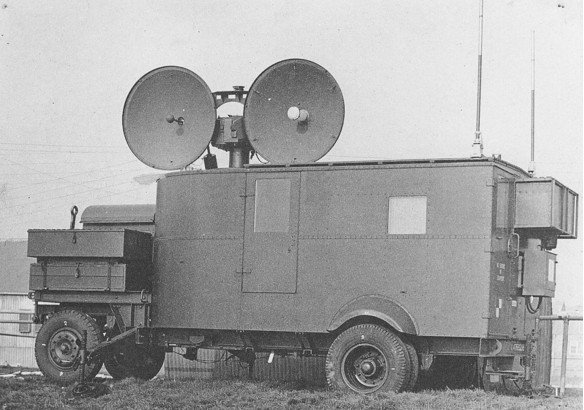
- GL Mk. III(B), with IFF
- Country of origin: UK
- Introduced: late 1942
- No. built: 876 B's, 667 C's
- Type: AA direction
- Frequency: 2.750–2.855 GHz
- PRF: 420
- Beamwidth: ~8 degrees
- Range: 32,000 yards maximum, 27,000 yards against a light bomber
- Precision: ±25 yards, ±1/6th degree at 32,000 yards
- Other names: Radar, Anti-Aircraft, No. 3

Radar, Gun Laying, Mark III, or GL Mk. III for short, was a radar system used by the British Army to directly guide, or lay, anti-aircraft artillery (AA). The GL Mk. III was not a single radar, but a family of related designs that saw constant improvement during and after World War II. These were renamed shortly after their introduction in late 1942, becoming the Radar, AA, No. 3, and often paired with an early warning radar, the AA No. 4, which was also produced in several models.

The Mk. III began development shortly after introducing the cavity magnetron in early 1940. The magnetron allowed radar systems to operate at microwave frequencies, greatly reducing the size of their antennas and making them much more mobile and accurate. Having originally started work on the magnetron as part of the AI Mk. VIII air-to-air radar, the team was told to drop everything and develop a radar for AA use as quickly as possible. This turned into a fiasco; by the end of the year, very little progress had been made, and the team returned to working on airborne radars.

The magnetron has also been demonstrated to the Canadians and the US as part of the Tizard Mission in the fall of 1940. Immediately following the visit, the National Research Council of Canada began development of a GL radar based on the UK design. The first examples of these GL Mk. III(C) (for Canadian) arrived in the UK in November 1942. British units of slightly more advanced design, GL Mk. III(B) (for British) arrived in December. 667 of the Canadian models were produced, with about 250 of these seeing service in the UK while most of the others were sent to the continent or remained in Canada, while a small number were used by the Australian Army. 876 of the British models were produced and saw more widespread service. Fifty Mk. IIIs were supplied to the Soviet Union.

Several improved versions of the Mk. III(B) were experimented with, but none were widely produced due to the 1944 introduction of the SCR-584 from the US, which provided both scanning and tracking in a single semi-trailer unit. Mk. III units found themselves relegated to secondary roles, as diverse as artillery spotting, coastal surveillance and weather balloon observation. Several upgrades were carried out for these roles, and modified weather units remained in use until about 1957/58. More radical development of the design also led to the greatly improved post-war AA No.3 Mk.7 radar, which served as the Army's primary AA radar until the removal of AA guns from service in the late 1950s.

== Development ==
=== Earlier systems ===
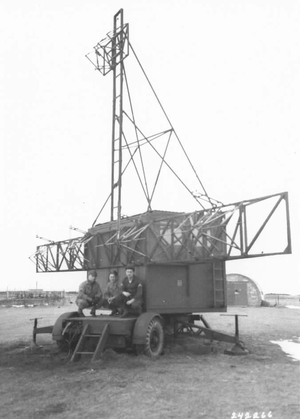
Transmitter cabin of the Mk. II radar, which indicates the size of the antennas needed at VHF frequencies.

The British Army began serious research in radar systems in 1936, after being introduced to the developments made by the Air Ministry at their experimental station at Bawdsey Manor. Among several possible uses for radar, the Army saw it as a way to address the pressing need to accurately measure the range to aerial targets. This was being handled by optical means that were difficult, time-consuming and error-prone, and a radar system could dramatically improve this task. The development team, nicknamed the "Army Cell", was set the task of building a system that would provide slant range measurements with an accuracy of 50 yards (46 m) or better.

The result was an unwieldy system known as the GL Mk. I radar. The Mk. I, like the Chain Home technology it was based on, used separate transmitter and receiver antennas that had to be moved in unison to track targets. The system did not provide an accurate bearing measurement and had no provision for measuring elevation. It did, however, meet the requirement for 50 yard accuracy in range, a measure that was automatically fed into the analog computers that handled the ballistics calculations. Performance of the guns improved immediately; before the arrival of the Mk. It was estimated that 41,000 shells had to be fired to achieve one destroyed aircraft; the introduction of the Mk. I, along with improved training, reduced this to 18,500 by late 1940.

Plans to add bearing and elevation measurements had been planned for a Mk. II version, which would be ready sometime in 1941. As it became clear that the need was more pressing, Leslie Bedford of A.C. Cossor suggested adding an elevation system to the Mk. I to get it into the field as soon as possible. This became the GL/EF system, which reached service in early 1941 and resulted in a huge decrease in rounds-per-kill to 4,100, making AA effective for the first time. Mk. II, which offered slightly higher accuracy, reduced this further to only 2,750 rounds-per-kill when it began to arrive in 1942.

=== Microwaves ===
The main reason for the unwieldiness of the early GL systems was a side-effect of the radio frequencies they used. GL had been designed in an era when the only electronics available were being adapted from commercial shortwave radio systems, and operated at wavelengths on the order of 5 to 50 m. It is a basic outcome of radio physics that antennas have to be at least half the length of the wavelength being used, which in this case required antennas several metres long.

The Admiralty had been placed in charge of vacuum tube (valve) development for the war effort. They were particularly interested in moving to much shorter wavelengths as a way to detect smaller objects, especially the conning towers and periscopes of U-boats. The Air Ministry's Airborne Group, led by Edward George Bowen, had the problem of desiring antennas small enough to mount in the nose of a twin-engine aircraft. They had managed to adapt an experimental television receiver to 1.5 m, but this still required large antennas that had to be mounted on the wings. At a meeting between Bowen and the Admiralty Experimental Department's Charles Wright, they found many reasons to agree on the need for a 10 cm wavelength system.

Given the support for microwave development from both services, Henry Tizard visited the General Electric Company's (GEC) Hirst Research Centre in Wembley in November 1939 to discuss the issue. Watt followed up with a personal visit some time later, leading to a 29 December 1939 contract for a microwave AI radar set using conventional tube electronics. Meanwhile, the Admiralty's Communication Valve Development Committee (CVD) approached Birmingham University to develop entirely new tube designs that might lead to better results.

=== Magnetrons ===
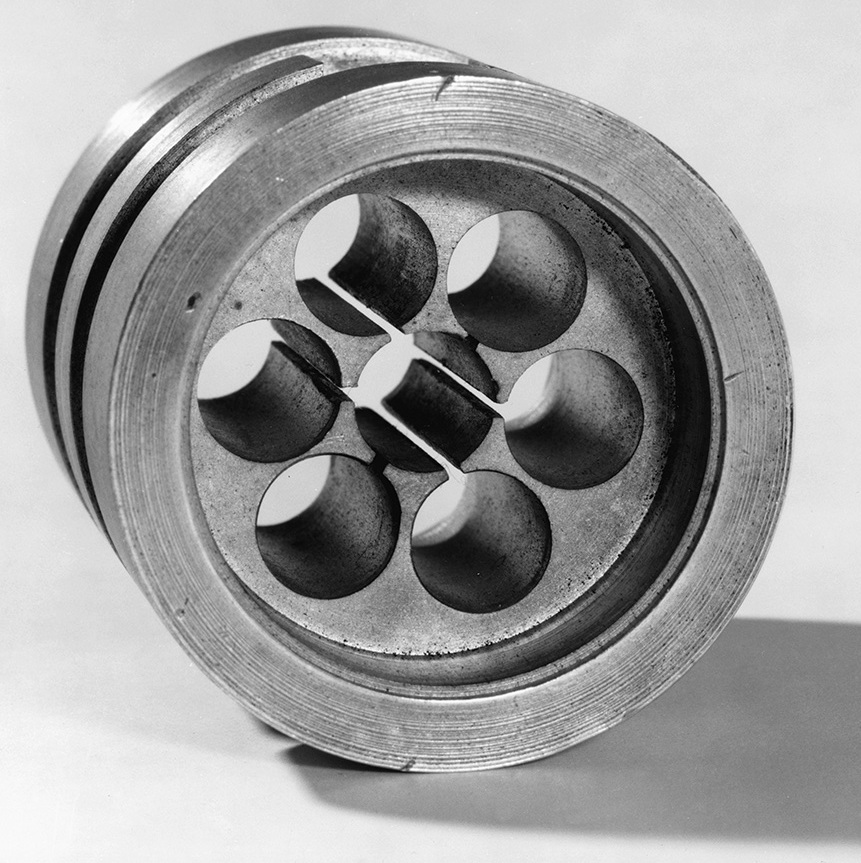
The magnetron, about 10 cm across, revolutionized radar development.

Birmingham's Mark Oliphant initially attacked the problem by attempting to further develop the klystron, a pre-war invention that was one of the first successful microwave-frequency tubes. A klystron produces microwaves by sending electrons past resonant cavities, causing microwave radio energy to be deposited within. This process is not efficient, and multiple resonators are normally used to produce useful output, although this produces very long tubes. Despite many attempts, by the end of 1939 their best klystrons were generating only 400 watts, far below what would be needed for radar use.

Two minor members of the team, John Randall and Harry Boot, had been asked to look at another concept, but this approach also failed to mature. Left with little to do, they begin considering alternative solutions. They struck upon the idea of using multiple resonant cavities arranged in a circle outside a common central core, as opposed to the klystron's linear arrangement. The electrons were bent into a circular path using a powerful magnet. In this arrangement, the electrons pass the resonators many times, producing, in essence, a klystron with hundreds of resonators. Their very first cavity magnetron produced 400 W, and was pushed to over 1 kW within a week. Within months, GEC had models producing pulses at 10 kW. These were soon being used in the design of a new airborne radar system initially known as AIS, for Airborne Interception, Sentimetric [sic].

The Army, meanwhile, had visited GEC on several occasions during 1940 and seen their progress using conventional tube electronics. In a series of steps, GEC had managed to reduce the operating wavelengths from the original 1.5 m to 50 cm, and later to 25 cm. These could be used in a directional system with an antenna a metre or less in size. In contrast to the Airborne Group, which needed even shorter wavelengths to make very small antennas that could fit in the nose of an aircraft, or the Navy, which needed a system with enough resolution to pick up periscopes, the Army was looking only for a practical improvement in accuracy and smaller antennas. This could be met with GEC's solution. The power output of these tubes was too low to initially see the targets as a reasonable range, so the idea emerged to use the new system just for tracking, while another would be used for early warning.

In August 1940, the Army issued a specification for a new GL radar that combined a VHF set like the Mk. II with a microwave-frequency tracking system with high accuracy. It required:

- initial pick-up for early warning at 30,000 yards
- pick-up for guidance at 22,000 yards
- accurate range to any target between 2,000 and 17,000 yards, although a shorter maximum of 14,000 yards was acceptable
- a beamwidth of 10 degrees ideally, but 14 degrees maximum
- elevations from 10 to 90 degrees above the horizon, with tracking possible up to 70 degrees

P. E. Pollard of the Air Defence Research and Development Establishment in Christchurch, Dorset had been one of the first people to consider radar as early as 1930, and had been working with the "Army Cell" at the Air Ministry Experimental Station for some time before joining other Army researchers at Christchurch, Dorset. They selected British Thomson-Houston (BTH), who built the earlier 5 m GL sets, to build a prototype. Pollard moved to BTH's plants in Rugby, Warwickshire to work on the new system.

=== Klystron failure ===
When Albert Percival Rowe, director of the Air Ministry's radar teams, heard of the Army's efforts in September 1940, he set about creating his own GL development effort using the magnetron. After a 22 September meeting with Philip Joubert de la Ferté, a senior commander in the RAF, Rowe built a GL team under the direction of D. M. Robinson using several members of the AIS team, telling them that they would have to focus on the GL problem for the next month or two.

This led to increasing friction between Philip Dee, who ran the AI team's magnetron efforts, and Rowe, in overall command of the Air Ministry researchers. Dee claimed that Rowe was "seizing this opportunity to try and filch the GL problem from the ADEE" (the Army Cell) and that "only Hodgkin is carrying on undisturbed with AIS, and Lovell and Ward are fortunately engaged upon basic work with aerials and receivers and are therefore relatively undisturbed by this new flap." According to Lovell this did not represent as much of a disruption as Dee believed. Moreover, to some extent, the klystron work at Birmingham had continued because of the Army's GL efforts.

The main issue for adapting the AI radar concepts to the GL problem was that of angular precision. In the case of AI, the radar operator was able to track the target with an accuracy of about 3 degrees, improving to as much as 1 degree at close range. This was more than enough for the pilot to see the target close to dead-ahead once they approached to within about 1,000 feet (300 m). For gun laying at long range the operators might never see the targets, so precision has to be at least 1/2 degree, and 1/10 would allow the guns to be directed solely by the radar.

The solution to providing much higher angular accuracy was already known, a technique known as conical scanning. Shortly after Lovell began working on such a system, Edgar Ludlow-Hewitt, Inspector General for the RAF, visited the Rowe. After the visit, Rowe told the team that a complete GL set had to be ready for fitting to a gun in two weeks. By 6 November Robinson had assembled a prototype system, but by 25 November he sent a memo to Rowe and Lewis (Rowe's assistant) stating that in the last 19 days, the system had only worked for 2 days due to a wide variety of problems. In December he was told to take the work completed so far to BTH for development into a deployable system. On 30 December 1940, Dee commented in his diary that:

The GL fiasco has ended up with the whole thing being moved en bloc to BTH, including two AMRE staff. Nothing ever worked properly at Leeson and Robinson is feeling that it has been very salutary for Lewis to learn how haywire all the basic technique really is.

=== Magnetron GL ===
As part of the Tizard Mission in August 1940, an early magnetron had been demonstrated to representatives of both the US's National Defense Research Committee (NDRC) as well as the Canadian National Research Council (NRC). The US and Canadian teams soon set up permanent contacts and split up their efforts to avoid duplication of work. A staff of six Canadians on loan from the NRC remained at the Radiation Lab through the war.

On 23 October 1940, the NRC team received a telegram from England asking them to begin work on a GL system using a magnetron. The requirements asked for a tracking range of up to 14,000 yards (13,000 m) with a range accuracy of 50 yards (46 m), although they desired it to be 25. They also wanted a search mode of unspecified range, with a range accuracy of 250 yards (230 m). Angular accuracy had to be at least 1/4 degrees in both axes, but 1/6 was desired. All of the outputs had to directly drive magslips.

Despite the rudimentary state of radar development at the NRC at that time, the UK was largely absent from further development. Although information about the GL system's development continued to flow to Canada, little economic or scientific support was given until 1943, when the NRC greatly expanded its liaison office in London. This lack of coordination would severely delay Canadian production of many radar systems. In contrast, the Canadian-US liaison team had already agreed that the US should concentrate on a more sophisticated system while the Canadians worked on their basic design.

Adding to the confusion, by January 1941, the Ministry of Supply gave up on the ongoing Army efforts in the UK and released a new specification for GL based on a magnetron. This meant that the earlier effort to develop a conventional transmitter had been wasted. On the upside, by this time, magnetron supplies were improving, and using one would produce a radar working at even shorter wavelengths and much higher power, improving both range and accuracy. BTH eventually delivered an experimental low-power "A model" on 31 May 1941, (Note: Other sources, including Wilcox, put the date in April.) although this was far from a field-ready system.

=== GL Mk. III(C) design ===
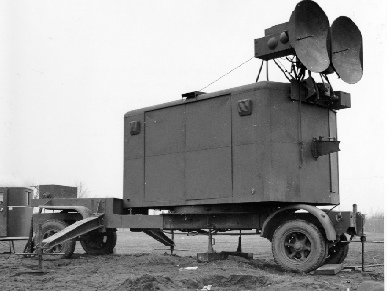
A Mk. III Accurate Position Finder (APF) ready for action, with its antennas raised and the carriage levelled. The cable behind the antennas runs to a winch on the front of the cabin that raises them into operating position.

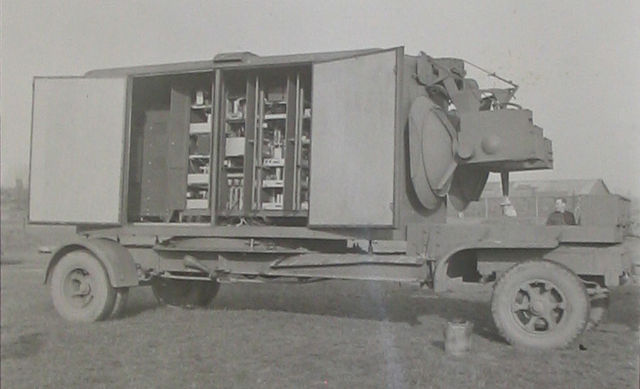
This GL Mk. IIIc APF is limbered for transit, with the antennas locked down. The cabin has been opened to display the electronics in the back of the consoles.

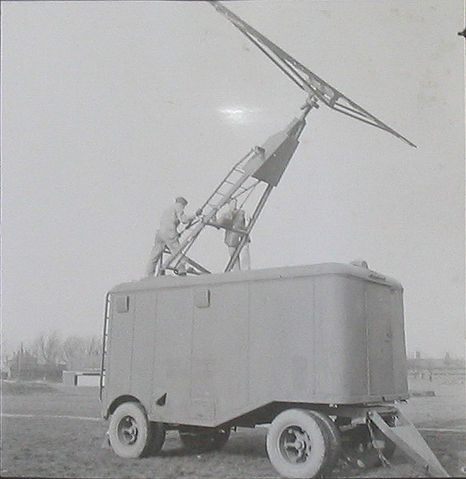
Crewmen raise the antenna boom of the Zone Position Indicator (ZPI).

The Canadian design became known as the Accurate Position Finder, or APF for short. At the time, the solution to rapidly switching a microwave signal between two antenna feeds had not been found. As the system had separate electronic systems for broadcast and reception, separate antennas for each would be needed. The team initially considered systems with one transmitter and one receiver, or a single transmitter and four receivers. This profusion of antennas was not a major problem in the GL role; the reflectors were about a metre across, which was not too large for a ground-based system, especially considering the multi-metre wide antennas of the GL Mk. II it would replace.

At the time, no one knew "how to design a waveguide with a low-loss rotating joint", so the problem of feeding the microwave energy from the magnetron to rotating antennas had no obvious solution. Instead, they decided to adopt the solution used for the earlier GL sets, and mount their entire electronics van on a bearing plate and point it in the required direction. This greatly complicated the trailer, and the fragility of the under-designed trailers was a major problem for Australian users.

A key difference between the Mk. IIIc and the earlier Mk. II came about due to a lack of CRTs for displays. The Mk. II had three CRTs, one each for range, azimuth and altitude. The altitude and azimuth displays showed only a single selected target picked out by the range operator, and then showed the signals from the up and down antennas on one display and left and right on another. The operators compared the length of the blips in order to determine which was longer and turn the cabin in that direction. In the IIIc, the altitude and azimuth displays were replaced by mechanical pointers driven by the electrical difference in the two signals.

Lacking a suitable early warning radar similar to the British Army's MRUs, the NRC also developed a second radar system known as the Zone Position Indicator (ZPI). This was rapidly developed using the basic design copied from the ASV Mk. II radar that had been supplied as part of an effort to begin production of ASV radars for the US Navy and Coast Guard. The ASV sets were based on conventional tube electronics and operated in the 1.5 metre band that was common to the early-war UK radars. As the APF operated at 10 cm, the two sets did not interfere with each other, and could be operated only meters apart. In operation, the ZPI would feed information to the APF, which would use this information to seek out the targets.

Despite the lack of close coordination with their British counterparts, the NRC had completed development of its version of the GL system in June 1941. The first full demonstration of the complete system was made to Canadian officials on 27 June, and again to visiting US officials on 23 July. At that time, the chief engineer of Westinghouse proved extremely impressed, and noted to a member of the NRC "that his company would not have believed that what we had done in nine months could have been done in two years."

=== GL Mk. III(C) production ===
While off to a great start in design terms, production of the units soon ran afoul of a peculiar Canadian wartime problem. Just after the opening of hostilities, General Andrew McNaughton, commander of the Canadian forces in Europe, urged that the government set up a company to supply the Canadian forces with various optical equipment like binoculars. These had been in short supply during World War I, and McNaughton was trying to ensure the same problem did not occur again. C.D. Howe, the Minister of Everything, set up a new Crown Corporation, Research Enterprises Limited (REL), to fill this requirement. When the need for electronics resulted in the need for a similar company, Howe chose to expand REL instead of creating a new company. REL had proven up to the task in the optics field, but when they expanded into electronics, trouble began.

The first order for 40 GL sets had been placed in January 1941, before the NRC had completed development. This order was followed by several additional orders from Canada, the UK, Australia, South Africa and others. Delivery dates were repeatedly pushed back as REL had problems delivering on several pre-existing contracts for other radar systems. The first production example didn't roll off the line at REL until July 1942, by which time it was clear there was an issue and pressure was put on the electronics division to speed up deliveries.

By this point, a single prototype had reached the UK in January 1942. This was sent to the Canadian Army and it was not seen by the British radar experts until some time later. When it did, the display system using the mechanical pointers proved to be an issue. In theory, this was simpler and less expensive, but it was also replacing a system that was already well known by Mk. II operators, and required them to be retrained. Another issue was that the Canadian designers had added a "velocity laying" system that smoothed out inputs to the control wheels that allowed for finer tracking, but was yet another change to get used to. In spite of these problems, there was still no delivery date on the UK versions, and likely due to pressure from Lindemann, an order was placed for an additional 560 examples, bringing the UK total to 600.

The first shipment of GL sets reached the UK in November 1942. When they arrived, the units were found to be completely unreliable. This led to a round of finger-pointing between the NRC team and REL. REL complained that the NRC had worked over 300 change orders into the design while production was being set up, filling a binder. The NRC, on the other hand, became convinced that the problem was due entirely to R.A. Hackbusch, director of the electronics section of REL. McNaughton became personally involved and had to call in Lt.Col. W. E. Phillips, director of REL, for a personal interview about the issues. He noted in his diary that Philips stated:

...and said there was a general deterioration of the nerves these days, people were tired and there was a lot of loss of control... It was a very interesting interview.

In an attempt to get to the bottom of the situation, Mackenzie of the NRC arranged for Col. Wallace to visit the REL on 11 November 1942. Wallace began to talk to people on the shop floor and was eventually told by one superintendent that Hackebusch personally ordered him to concentrate on quantity rather than quality, so that the systems were not being tested before delivery. It also became clear that Hackebusch had hidden this from Phillips in previous communications.

In spite of this, and the continued failures in the field, no action was immediately taken to fix the problem. During a visit to Ottawa in March 1943, Phillips met with Mackenzie and Wallace and agreed the problem was real, admitting "all the weaknesses of Hackbusch and [said] they are going to make a fundamental change which we all know is overdue by at least two years." Yet still nothing was done. It was not until 2 September that Philips was "forced to accept his [Hackbusch's] resignation". A week later, Wallace was given the job, although he remained Director of the Radio Branch at NRC as well. When Mackenzie visited REL on 30 March 1944, he reported that the company was completely reorganized.

Adding to their problems, REL was constantly short of magnetrons, which were built by General Electric in the US, CRTs for the displays, or the multitude of other conventional vacuum tubes the system used. Then, in the middle of development, the UK demanded that the system be upgraded to support IFF use. Lacking an IFF unit of their own, British sets were used, which proved to interfere with the ZPIs, which operated in similar frequencies.

In spite of all these problems, REL delivered 314 sets by the end of 1942, and these quickly replaced the older Mk. II sets at AA emplacements around the UK. The UK-based APFs formed the backbone of the London-area AA direction during Operation Steinbock in early 1944, the last concerted German bombing effort using manned aircraft. One of the earliest uses for the III(C) in Canada was as a surface-search system to detect U-boats in the Saint Lawrence River.

By 1943, the need for the Mk. III units had dried up with the imminent arrival of the SCR-584 units from the United States. The UK cancelled its order in January 1944, which was a major blow to REL. Of the 667 Mk. III(C)swere eventually completed, 600 were sent to the UK, with about half of these used in the field in Europe as mobile units, and the other half used at static emplacements in the UK. The small number of Mk. III(C)s sent to Australia proved almost unusable as delivered, and had to be extensively rebuilt in order to make them operational.

=== GL Mk. III(B) production ===
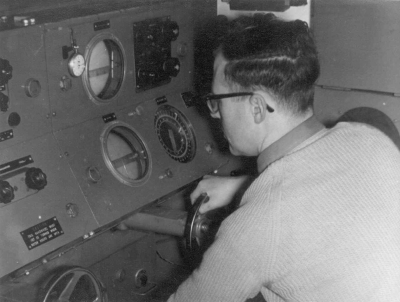
Bill Wallace operates the range and bearing controls of a GL Mk. III radar while tracking a weather balloon for the Met Office during the 1950s.

After the first experimental magnetron set had been delivered in April 1941, BTH continued development of their Mk. III design, introducing a Model B in July 1941. This led to an order for 28 hand-built prototypes, five of which were delivered between December 1941 and April 1942, reaching only eight by the end of 1942. Along with the prototype order, an order for a further 900 production models had also been placed in July 1941. This last order was later increased to 1,500, 500 each from BTH, Standard Telephones and Cables and Ferranti. The first of these models arrived in December 1942.

Since BTH's Mk. III(B) had its design frozen sometime later than the Canadian model, which featured a number of improvements that produced a much more practical design. Foremost among these differences was the mounting of the antennas on a large metal pole, the rotor, that projected down through the roof to the floor of the trailer where it sat in a bearing. Instead of trying to rotate the microwave feeds, the III(B) mounted the radio frequency components on the mast, and then fed power to them via conventional brushings. This allowed the antennas, on top of the mast, to rotate easily under the control of the operator, turning a large handwheel. This eliminated the need to rotate the entire cabin and greatly simplified the carriage.

Several other details changed as well, notably the elimination of the electronics needed to compare the left/right and up/down signals, and the lack of the "velocity laying" system. This reduced the valve count from 120 to 60, a significant issue in that era, which made the resulting design smaller, more mobile and about half the cost. A minor change was the use of fabric covers stretched over the antenna and fastened to the outside edge of the parabolic reflectors. With the covers in place, the assemblies look like two flat disks, an easy way to tell them apart from the Canadian version.

It was at this point that Fredrick Lindmann stepped in. He was not impressed by anti-aircraft fire and stated that more German bombers would be destroyed by bombing the homes of the people who manufactured them than any amount that radar-guided guns could hope for. He suggested cancelling the production order to allow the British firms to concentrate on the H2S radar that would allow British bombers free range over Germany, and relegating the AA radars to the Canadian model that seemed to be available more quickly anyway.

At this point, a shortage of electronic valves ("tubes") broke out as all of the services in the UK demanded new radar systems. Frederick Alfred Pile, the General in charge of AA, had no illusions as to where the Army fitted into the schedule of priorities. Delays dragged on, and it was not until late in 1943 that there were enough supplies to enter full-scale production.

At this point, a second order for 2,000 units was placed. However, total production during 1944 was only 548 sets. By this time, the US SCR-584 was beginning to arrive and was considerably better than the Mk. III(B), so production was deliberately slowed. When production ended in April 1945, a total of 876 had been delivered. Some of these also included interrogators for IFF Mark III, which can be distinguished by the two large whip antennas extending from the rear cabin roof.

In the field, it was noticed that the III(B) could pick up mortar rounds at a range of about 5,000 yards (4,600 m). By taking the position of the round at several points during the flight, it was possible to calculate where it was launched from.

=== GL Mk. III(B) versions ===
Mk. III(B) was upgraded several times during the production run, although these later versions are universally known by the later AA No. 3 Mk. 2 name, the Mk. 1 being the III(C). (Note: The nomenclature appears to have been changed in the autumn of 1943 or 1944. The only reference to the renaming is a passing one in the histories of the No. 1 Canadian Radio Location Unit, which describes the unit being active for some time before being told their Mk. IIIC's "would be replaced during December". As the Mk. III(C) was introduced operationally in 1943 and replaced by the SCR-584 in early 1945, this suggests the renaming took place in late 1944.)

The Mk. 2/1 version added automatic tracking that allowed the operator to lock onto a target and then have the electronics automatically follow it with no further manual intervention. The /2 was a dual-mode system whose displays could be used for anti-aircraft or in the Coast Defense role. The /3 also had lock-follow, but used a model developed by AA Command rather than the Army's Radar Research and Development Establishment (RRDE). The /5 was a /2 with the same lock-follow as the /3. The AA No. 3 Mk. 2(F) was an unmodified No. 3 used by the Field Army as a mortar locating radar.

It was the AA No. 3 Mk. 2/4 that achieved the only lasting use of the original Mk. III design. This was an AA No. 3 Mk. 2 with additional circuitry that allowed the timebase to be offset by the equivalent of 30,000 yards (27,000 m) or 60,000 yards (55,000 m). This provided three sets of ranges, 0 to 32,000, 30,000 to 62,000, and 60,000 to 92,000 yards. This version was used as a meteorological system for measuring the winds aloft by launching weather balloons with radar reflectors that allowed them to be tracked for extended periods. The Mk.2/4 was widely used into the late 1950s in this role.

=== Other GL radars ===
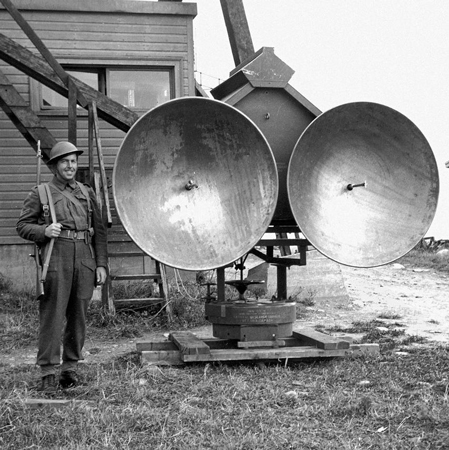
A Canadian Army soldier with a standalone experimental GL Mk. III variant. Note that some sources erroneously describe this as the Night Watchman radar.

While development of the Mk. III dragged on, the Army began a crash program to develop an intermediate system using the same 1.5 m band electronics being widely used in other radars. Known as "Baby Maggie", it is unclear whether it was assigned a number in the original GL series, although it was named using the new nomenclature as the AA No. 3 Mk. 3.

The Royal Artillery's historian records that 'Baby Maggie' originated in the Mediterranean theatre with 62nd Anti-Aircraft Brigade, which commanded the AA units in the Allied invasion of Sicily (Operation Husky). It was intended as a light-weight alternative to the bulky two-cabin GL sets, capable of being landed over open beaches. Improvised from existing Searchlight Control Radar (SLC) components and reduced to bare essentials, its transmitter, receiver, aerial array and operating display were all housed in a single two-wheeled trailer towed by a 3-ton lorry. It had a maximum detection range of 20,000 yards (18,000 m) depending on siting, and for gunnery purposes could track from 14,000 yards (13,000 m) inwards. Twelve sets were issued to heavy AA Troops deployed in the first phase of the Husky landings, and it was employed again for the landings at Salerno (Operation Avalanche). Baby Maggie's performance in action was disappointing, not because of any radar defects but because of mechanical failure caused by rough going. The trailer chassis was overloaded, and on steep gradients the top of the cabin fouled the towing vehicle, with consequent damage. It was abandoned after Salerno.

A number of sources claim that 50 Baby Maggies were sent to the USSR. Whether these are the same as the reports of the 50 GL Mk. III's being sent, or if 50 of the Baby Maggie and another 50 Mk. III(B) were sent, remains unclear. Some units saw post-war use in India for weather balloon tracking.

Development of the Mk. III continued through the period while the SCR-584 was being deployed. This led to a new model in 1944, the AA No.3 Mk. 4, code-named "Glaxo". Only a few Glaxos were produced during the last stages of the war.

Further development of the same design under the rainbow codename "Blue Cedar" produced an extremely successful design that entered service as the AA No. 3 Mk. 7. Mk. 7 remained in use as the UK's primary gun laying radar until the large AA guns were removed from service in the late 1950s. The Mk. 7 was also used as the illuminator for an early beam riding surface-to-air missile, Brakemine.

== Description ==
This description is based on the British Mk. III(B) model. In general terms, the Mk. III(C) would be similar, with the exception of details of the mechanical arrangement of the trailer and cabin.

=== Equipment layout ===
The Mk. III was built on a five-ton, four-wheel trailer made by Taskers of Andover. The cabin was built by Metro-Cammell, a builder of railway carriages. The deck of the front 1/4 of the trailer was waist height, providing room for the front axle to steer during towing. Immediately behind the wheels, the chassis stepped down, with the rear portion being closer to the ground. The main cabin was situated on top of this lower section, with fenders providing clearance around the rear wheels.

The radar antennas were mounted on a large metal pole extending from the top of the cabin. A complex framework just above the roof allowed the antennas to be rotated vertically, controlled by an arm mounted behind the right parabolic reflector (dish). The two dishes were mounted on either side of the pole, with a gap between them. IFF antennas, if mounted, extended from the two upper rear corners of the cabin. The higher front area of the trailer mounted a generator as well as wooden boxes for storage of spares and tools.

To set up for operation, the trailer was parked on suitably flat land and the brakes were locked. Three levelling jacks were then swung out from the trailer, one on either side at the front where the step in the chassis met the cabin, and another from the rear of the cabin. The jacks were then used to level the cabin using spirit levels. The radar dishes were then raised, the generator started, and operations could begin. The entire setup took about 20 minutes, with 3 minutes required to warm up the electronics.

The entire system, including trailer, weighed over 9 long tons (9,100 kg), was 14 feet (4.3 m) high with the antennas raised or 12.5 feet (3.8 m) with them lowered for transport, was just over 22 feet (6.7 m) long and 9.5 feet (2.9 m) wide, extending to 15.5 feet (4.7 m) wide with the levelling jacks deployed.

=== Signal details ===
The system was driven by a 440 Hz motor driven alternator mounted on the front of the cabin. This powered the electronics, as well as a motor in the receiver dish that spun the antenna at 440 rpm. The same motor also drove a small two-phase alternator whose relative phases rotated in synchronicity with the receiver antenna.

The transmitter consisted of a single magnetron, initially 100 kW but up to 350 kW in later versions. It produced a 1 microsecond pulse at the same 440 Hz rate as the main alternator. This produced a pulse repetition frequency (PRF) of 440 Hz, very low for a radar of this type. For comparison, the German Würzburg radar, the Mk. III's counterpart, had a PRF of 3,750, which provides a much better signal on reception.

The receiver consisted of two superheterodyne units. The first used a tunable klystron and crystal detector to produce an intermediate frequency (IF) of 65 MHz, which then went through a two-stage amplifier. The result was then mixed down to a new IF of 10 MHz and into a three-stage amplifier. A final rectifier produced a signal that was fed directly into the Y-axis deflection plates of the CRTs.

Which CRT to feed the signal two was controlled by the phase of the smaller alternator. The output was sent into a switchbox that compared the relative phase of the two signals, sending it out one of four outputs, rotating from up to right, bottom and left. The right and up channels were passed through delays.

=== Displays and interpretation ===
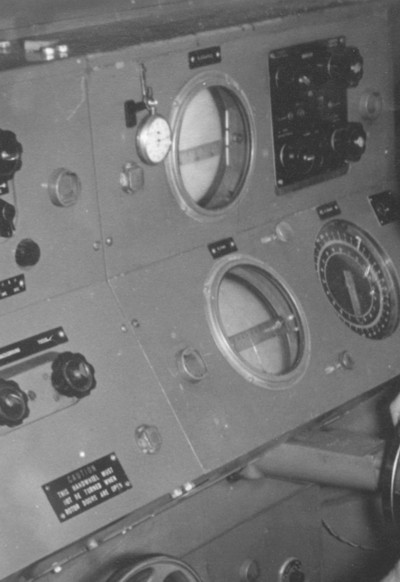
Close-up of the console seen above. The upper CRT, eye level, is the coarse range display. The metal wire used for positioning the blip is just visible on the fine range display below it. The range is read off the clock-like gauge to the right of the lower CRT. Bearing and elevation displays are to the left, out of frame. The stopwatch at the top was added so the Met Office operators could time their measurements accurately.

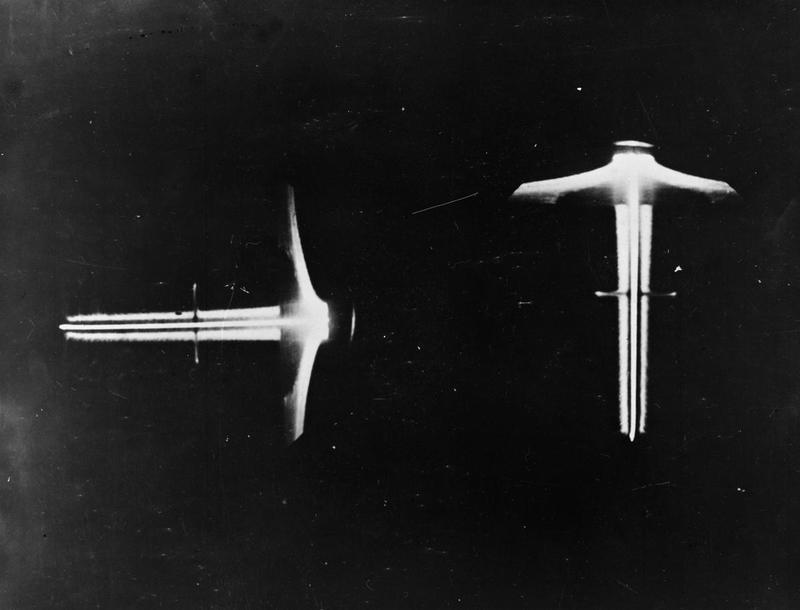
The Mk. III elevation and bearing displays would look similar to these images of the AI Mk. IV radar. A single target blip can just be seen about half-way along the time base. The blips are equal length on the left display, but slightly longer on the right side of the right display. This means the target is centred vertically, but slightly to the right. The large triangular shapes on the left and top are caused by ground reflections, and would not normally be seen when the antennas were pointed upward.

The Mk. III used a somewhat complex multi-cathode ray tube (CRT) display system known as the Presentation Unit, built by The Gramophone Company (EMI).

Typical radar displays of the era measured range by comparing the blip of the return against its position on the CRT face. Measuring against a scale might offer range accuracy on the order of 200 to 400 yards (180–370 m) on the Mk. III's 6 inches (15 cm) CRTs, far less accuracy than needed for the gun laying role. To solve this problem, the Mk. III used two range displays, coarse and fine. The coarse display, placed about eye level in the console, was a classic A-scope display, showing all the blips within the range of the radar, normally 32,000 yards (29,000 m).

A large handwheel projecting from the console about knee level rotated a large potentiometer whose output was sent into a large capacitor. When the capacitor reached a pre-selected voltage, it triggered a second timebase generator set to 6 microseconds, or in the case of the radar's there-and-back round trip, 1,000 yards (910 m). The output of this time base was inverted and mixed into the signal on the coarse display, causing a bright extended line to appear along the bottom of the baseline, known as the strobe. As the operator turned the handwheel, the strobe moved back and forth along the display, allowing the selection a particular target by centring it within the strobe.

Moving the strobe allowed the range operator to select targets within the 1,000 yard "window". This window filled the fine range display; this was also a 6 inch display so on this display every inch represented about 50 metres (160 ft), offering much greater accuracy. In operation, the operator would continually turn the handwheel in an effort to keep the blip exactly centred in the display, as measured against a fine metal wire stretched over the face of the tube. This allowed continual range output with an accuracy on the order of 25 yards (23 m), more than accurate enough for the gun laying role. To the right of the fine display was a mechanical dial with a large pointer that displayed the current range as selected by the handwheel.

An even faster timebase, 4 microseconds long, was triggered at the centre of the strobe. Only those signals in this 650 yards (590 m) window were sent to the elevation and bearing displays, so their displays showed only the single blip selected in the strobe. This eliminated the need for them to have a course display. Instead, their stations had only the equivalent of the fine display, repositioned at eye level to make reading easier. The vacant display location in the lower panel where the fine display would normally be was instead used to hold the mechanical dials that displayed the current bearing or altitude. The bearing operator sat to the left of the range operator, and the altitude operator to his left. This allowed a single operator at the range display to reach the bearing handwheel with ease, although the altitude wheel was somewhat of a reach.

Although this method of scanning allowed accurate measurement of the angle of the target, it did not directly indicate which direction to turn the antenna to centre it – this could be seen in the rising and falling blip strength, but in practice, this was far too fast to follow visually. This is where the electrical delays on the switchbox came into play. By delaying the right signal compared to the left, the resulting display shows two peaks separated horizontally. These would be roughly centred depending on the accuracy of the range operator. The higher blip was in the direction to turn; if the left blip was larger, the operator needed to turn the antenna to the left. the up/down display worked the same, although the operator had to "rotate" the image in their head.

=== Operational technique ===
Given the limited angle that the Mk. III scanned, 10 degrees at most, the system was normally paired with a second radar with a much wider scanning pattern. In the case of the AA No. 4, this provided a complete 360 degree scan that was displayed on a plan-position indicator. The operators of this second radar would call out contacts to the Mk. III operators, who would spin their antenna to the indicated bearing and then move the antenna vertically to find the target. When a blip was seen on the coarse range display, the range operator would move the strobe into position, and from then on all of the operators would move their controls continuously to create smooth tracking.

The range control was connected to a potentiometer and measured range electronically. The elevation and azimuth was measured via the physical position of the antenna. Turning the handwheels at these positions drove the rotor assembly through selsyn motors, and the current position was fed back to the operator display using magslips, better known today as synchros. The output of the magslips was also amplified and sent to external connectors, where they could be used to create additional displays at remote locations. These were normally sent into the inputs of the gunnery analog computers, known as predictors.

=== IFF use ===
As early as 1940 some British aircraft were equipped with the IFF Mk. II system, and by the time the Mk. III radars were being introduced in 1943, many aircraft were equipped with IFF Mk. III. These consisted of a transponder installed on the aircraft that was tuned to a pre-selected frequency, and when it heard a signal on this frequency, sent out a short signal of its own on a different pre-selected frequency.

GL Mk. III was optionally equipped with the corresponding interrogator. When the radar operator pressed a button, the interrogator would send out periodic signals on the selected frequency via a large whip antenna mounted at the rear corner of the cabin. The responding signal from the transponder was received on a second antenna on the opposite rear corner of the cabin, amplified, and sent into the displays. This signal mixed with the radar's own receiver, causing the new signal to be displayed directly behind the blip. Instead of a sharp bell curve like shape, a signal responding to the IFF challenge would have a rectangular extension behind it, allowing the operator to easily see which aircraft were friendly. In practice, IFF selection was often handled by the search radar before they handed off to the GL, and the IFF fittings on GL were not universal.

=== Scientific use ===
After the Second World War a surplus dish antenna from a Type IIIC Gun Laying Radar was used as a solar radio telescope by the National Research Council in Ottawa. During the Solar eclipse of November 23, 1946 it was determined that the solar radio emission originated in the vicinity of sunspots when a strong drop in signal strength occurred as the Moon blocked a large sunspot group. It was the first radio telescope in Canada.

The Mk. III's longest lasting use was for meteorological measurements of winds aloft by tracking radar reflectors hung from weather balloons. To measure speed, a stopwatch was mounted near the range display and readings were made every minute.

As the balloons often blew out of the radar's nominal 32,000 yard range, these versions were equipped with a Range Extender device. This was a monostable multivibrator, known as a One-Shot or Kipp Relay, that triggered the coarse time base, offsetting its starting point so it did not trigger immediately after the transmission, but a selected time after that. The Extender had settings for 30,000 or 60,000 yards, so the system could track the balloons in three general windows, 0 to 32,000 yards, 30,000 to 62,000, and 60,000 to 92,000.

These units were produced after the naming had been changed, and were universally known as AA No. 3 Mk. 2/4.
