= Walter Surén =

German WW2 Lieutenant general

Walter Surén (15 August 1880, in Thorn – 8 March 1976, in Rottach-Egern) was a general officer with the final rank – General der Luftnachrichtentruppe (en: General of air force communications troops) of the Deutsche Luftwaffe (en: German Air Force) in Nazi Germany. Until the end of WW2 in 1945, this particular general officer rank was on three-star level (OF-8), equivalent to a US Lieutenant general.

== Career ==
Promotions

- Fahnenjunker – 09 February 1900
- Leutnant – 18 January 1901
- Oberleutnant – 01 October 1907
- Hauptmann – 10 September 1913
- Character as Major – 9 February 1920; full Major – 1 October 1934
- Oberstleutnant – 1 January 1935
- Oberst – 1 April 1937
- Generalmajor (one-star rank) – 1 April 1939
- Generalleutnant (two-star rank) – 1 April 1941
- General der Luftnachrichtentruppe – 30 January 1945

Walter Surén joined the 1st Railway-Regiment (German Imperial Army, Heer) 09 February 1900, became Fahnenjunker/Fähnrich, was promoted to 2nd lieutenant and served over there until 18 October 1905. From 19 Oct 1905 to 30 Sep 1907, he served as company officer in the Enterprise-Company of the Railway-Brigade. Due to outstanding performance he was detached to the Military Technical Academy (1907-1911), and became after graduation Adjutant of the Director of Military Railways (1911-1912). The next assignment of Surén was company Officer of the 5th Telegraph-Battalion (1912-1913), and company-chief in the 1st Telegraph-Battalion (1913-1914). After that, he was assigned commander of the Motor-Vehicle-Battalion in the Grand Headquarters (1914-1915). From 1915 to 1916 he commanded the 7th Telephone-Battalion, and became October 13, 1916 “Oberoffizier Nachrichten” (en: staff-officer of the signals troops) in the “Oberkommando des Heeres” (en: Army High Command). The next mission of Surén was commanded the 11th Telephone-Battalion (1 January – 14 March 1917), followed by Group-Telephone-Commander 11./XI. Army-Corps (15 March – 12 August 1917), and Signal-Adviser of the General-Staff of the Army-Group “Deutscher Kronprinz” until the End of WW I.

From 1 February – 29 April 1919 he served as Group-Signal-Commander with the Special-Purpose-General-Command 52, Border-Protection East, followed by the assignment to leader of the 104th Brigade-Signal-Battalion. With the character as Major Walter Surén was retired 9 February 1920.

In the capacity as communications engineer, he worked as representative of the “Deutsche Reichsbahn” (en: German Railway-Company) in Yugoslavia (1920 – 1933). 1933 he went back to Germany, employed by the Army, with the Commander Berlin until 28 February 1934. Then he entered the German Luftwaffe, first as supplemental-officer (1 April 1938). His primary mission was handling of the Wire-Signal-Affairs of the newly established “Luftnachrichtentruppe” (en: Air-Signal-Troop), supported to the “Reichsluftfahrtministerium” (RLM) (1934 – 1938). This was followed by the duty as Signals-Leader with Air-Fleet-Command 3 / Commander of the 3rd Air-Signal-Regiment (1 February 1939 – 31 August 1939), next High-Signals-Leader Air-Fleet-Command 3 (1 September 1939 – 18 September 1940), and High-Signals-Leader Air-Fleet-Command 4 (19 September 1940 – 17 November 1942). From November 18, 1942 – 30 September 1943 he was dedicated to Higher-Wehrmacht-Signals-Leader with Commander-in-Chief South. From 1 October 1943 to 31 December 1944, he was acting as Signals-Leader of the Luftwaffe in the RLM. Then he was assigned to the so-called “Führerreserve” (1 January – 28 February 1945). The final mission of Walter Surén was Signal-Leader with Generalfeldmarschall Erhard Milch, General-Plenipotentiary of the Deutsche Reichsbahn (15 March 1945 – … May 1945).

== Decorations and awards ==
- Deutsche Kreuz – in Silber = 21 September 1942, as Generalleutnant and Höherer Fernmeldeführer to the Luftflottenkommando 4
- Ritterkreuz des Königlich Preußischen Hausordens von Hohenzollern mit Schwertern
- 1914 Eisernes Kreuz I. Klasse
- 1914 Eisernes Kreuz II. Klasse
- Ehrenkreuz für Frontkämpfer
- Wehrmacht-Dienstauszeichnung IV. bis II. Klasse
- Medaille zur Erinnerung an den 01.10.1938 mit Spange „Prager Burg“
- Kriegsverdienstkreuz II. Klasse mit Schwertern
- Kriegsverdienstkreuz I. Klasse mit Schwertern
