= Radar, Anti-Aircraft No. 3 Mk. 7 =

Mobile anti-aircraft gun

AA No. 3 Mk. 7
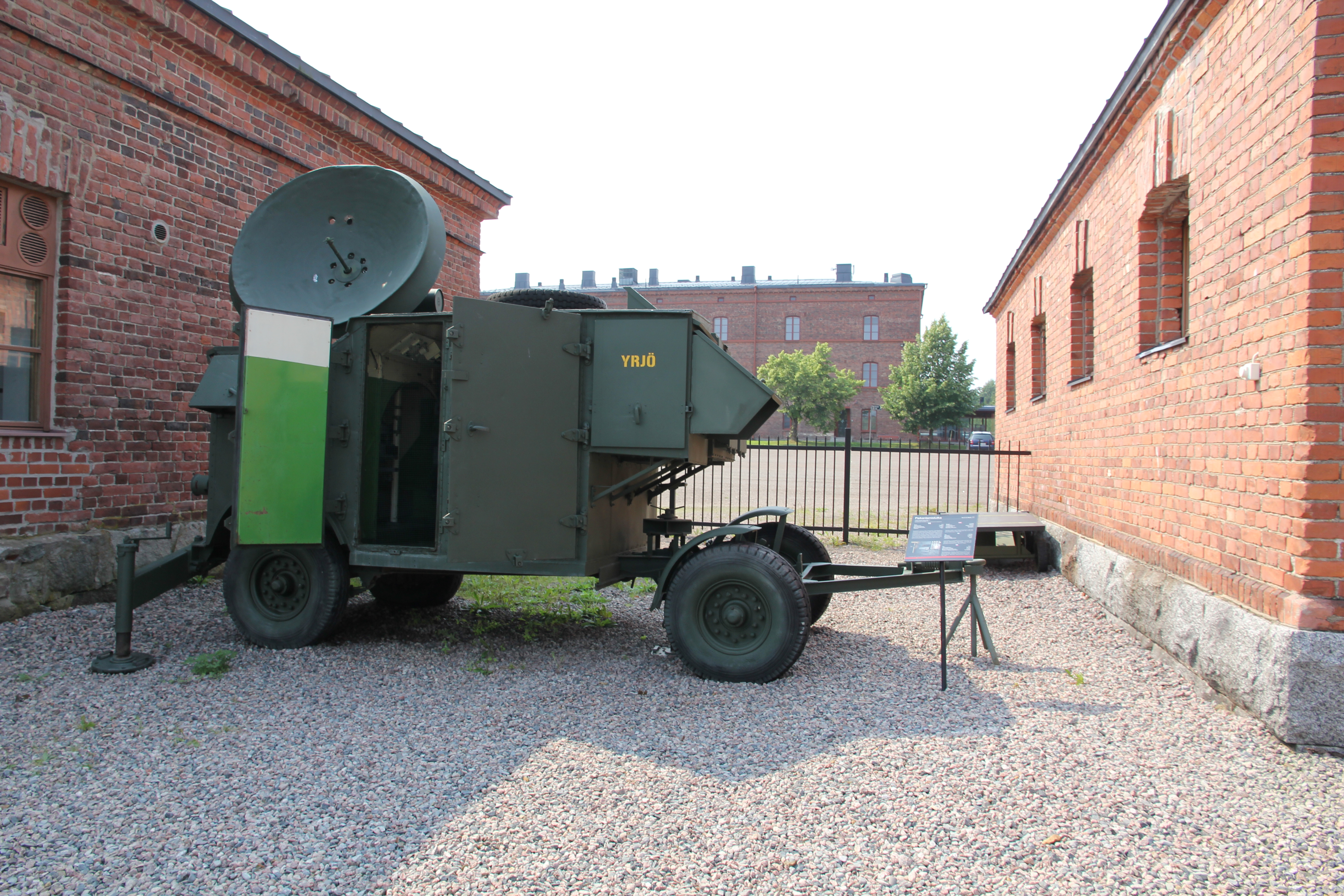
- Finnish AA No. 3 Mk. 7 radar used as a counter-battery radar under the name "Yrjö".
- Country of origin: UK
- Introduced: 1952
- No. built: ~365
- Type: Gun Laying
- Frequency: 3 to 3.12 GHz (S band)
- PRF: 1500 pps
- Pulsewidth: 0.5 μs
- RPM: 20 rpm while scanning
- Range: 950 to 36,000 yd (870–32,920 m)
- Diameter: 5 ft (1.5 m)
- Power: 200 kW
- Other names: Blue Cedar

Radar, Anti-Aircraft Number 3 Mark 7, also widely referred to by its development rainbow code Blue Cedar, was a mobile anti-aircraft gun laying radar designed by British Thomson-Houston (BTH) in the mid-1940s. It was used extensively by the British Army and was exported to countries such as Holland, Switzerland, Sweden, Finland, and South Africa. In British service, it was used with the 5.25 inch and QF 3.7 inch AA guns, as well as the Brakemine missile.

Mk. 7 developed from experiments in the mid-WWII era on auto-follow radar systems on the GL Mk. III radar and Searchlight Control radar systems. Production was not taken up at that time due to the imminent arrival of the SCR-584, which had the same feature. The concept was studied again in the immediate post-war era, further improvements made, and put into production starting in 1952. About 365 were made in three major production runs, the last ordered in 1954.

The unit was housed in an air-conditioned trailer that was significantly smaller and more portable than the World War II-era SCR-584 and GL Mk. III radars it replaced; the Blue Cedar weighed about 5 short tons, compared to about double that for the SCR-584. It was normally towed by an AEC Matador artillery tractor unit, as opposed to requiring a semi-trailer. It could be emplaced and operational in under an hour, automatically feeding data though synchros to the gunnery computer and then directly to the guns.

Blue Cedar was the primary gun-laying system for the Army through the 1950s. Beginning in 1953, the air defence mission began to move from the Army to the Royal Air Force, and from anti-aircraft artillery to surface-to-air missiles, which had their own radars. It remained in service with field units, notably the British Army of the Rhine, until 1957 when large AA guns began to be replaced by the Thunderbird missile. Some were converted into counter-battery radars known as the Mk. 7(F). These, and other modifications for roles like weather balloon tracking, kept numbers of Blue Cedar in service well into the 1970s.

== History ==
=== GL Mk. I & II ===
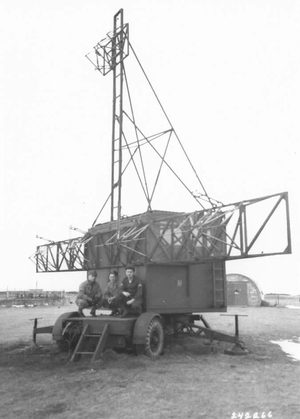
The early GL radars were very large, this is just the transmitter for the GL Mk. II.

The British Army's first radars were intended to measure the distance to aircraft as an aiming aid for anti-aircraft artillery. In the 1930s, measuring the angle to the target was easily accomplished with optical instruments, but rangefinding remained a time-consuming and inaccurate process. This led to the creation of the GL Mk. I radar which was introduced in 1939.

It quickly became clear that a range-only system was wasting considerable utility inherent to the design. Since the radar's signal spread over about 20 degrees, it observed a wide area of the sky and was able to detect targets before the crews on the optical instruments could. Additionally, it worked at night or in bad weather. This led to the GL Mk. II design which also measured angles with enough accuracy to directly lay the guns, removing the need for the optical instruments entirely. However, as this was not immediately available, a modification of the existing Mk. I's, the Mk. I/EF, was used until the Mk. IIs became more widely available in 1941.

While these systems worked, they were unwieldy. The size of an antenna needed to efficiently broadcast and receive a signal is a function of the wavelength, so with the GL's ~4 m wavelength, antenna elements several meters across were needed. Focussing such a signal requires several such antennas, or one antenna and a suitable reflector, making the complete antenna system much larger. In the case of the GL radars, the antennas were supported on large steel frameworks about 10 m across, rather less portable than desired.

=== GL Mk. III ===
The introduction of the cavity magnetron in 1940 led to a revolution in radar design. A simple device the size of a fist generated tens of kilowatts of radio energy, rivalling some of the most powerful room-filling broadcasters. More importantly, it operated at wavelengths that were much shorter than any existing system; at ~10 cm, the antennas were only a few centimetres long, making them very easy to fit on aircraft and small vehicles. They were so small that it became practical to use a parabolic reflector to focus them, producing beams only a few degrees wide from an assembly perhaps a meter across, or smaller.

Initially, most work with the magnetron was focused on airborne roles, where its small size was an enormous advantage. However, as the winds of war changed, there was increasing demand for a new anti-aircraft radar that could replace the existing GL's with something that was far more practical, and in particular, much more mobile. In November 1940 the magnetron had been demonstrated to Canadian and US researchers, both of whom had begun developing their own versions of GL based on it. After some initial work, the three countries agreed that Canada and the UK would work on a simple system that could be deployed as quickly as possible, while the US would work on a much more advanced system.

The result of all this work was the GL Mk. III radar, versions of which were built by both the Canadians and UK firms. The Canadian version reached service first, with early production examples being shipped to the UK in November 1942. These proved highly unreliable in the field, and they used a mechanical indicator system instead of cathode ray tube (CRT) systems which required the crews to undergo retraining. Production quantities of the UK version, which used CRTs, did not begin to arrive until the middle of 1943.

=== Technical developments ===
As the Mk. III's were being designed, two new concepts were being developed that greatly improved radar designs.

The first advance came as part of the development of airborne microwave radars. The Mk. 3 used separate transmit and receive antennas because they lacked a suitable way to rapidly switch the antenna feed from the transmitter to receiver. Using two reflectors was not going to work on aircraft, and the Air Ministry teams, now known as the Telecommunications Research Establishment (TRE), continued looking for solutions. In March 1941 this arrived in the form of the soft Sutton tube, a simple vacuum tube device that switched from input to the output so rapidly as to be effectively instant.

The second was part of the development of lock-follow systems. At the end of 1940, the Army began introducing its latest radar, the Searchlight Control radar (SLC). This was a simple system that was attached directly to a searchlight to allow it to easily find targets at night. The system used a unique arrangement of four antennas connected together in pairs, up/down and left/right. Three operators were required, each with their own CRT display. One display received the signal from all four antennas, showing every target in the area, and its operator selected one for tracking. The other two CRTs received the signals from the up/down, left/right pairs. By comparing the height of the blips, their operators could see which antenna was closer to the target, and turn the light in that direction to track it.

In 1941, an engineer at BTH, L.C. Ludbrook, began development of a lock-follow system for the SLC. This used simple electronics that were fed the paired signals and output a current whose magnitude depended on the amount of difference between the two. This signal was then sent into amplidynes that amplified the signal and drove motors that turned the light. Only a single operator was needed; they selected a target on their CRT, and then the rest of the operation was completely automated. This was not only more accurate, but it also eliminated two crewmen and their CRTs, both of which were in short supply.

Ludbrook's system was not put into production for the SLC systems, but the idea quickly caught the interest of the entire radar establishment. A number of different designs using different underlying electronics or drivers were introduced around the same time. There was a brief attempt to adapt the Canadian Mk. IIIs to use auto-follow, but as this system swung the entire cabin around to track, the power required to drive the pointing motors was huge. Lock-follow was experimented with on the British Mk. IIIs, which turned only the antennas, producing the 3/1 and 3/3 models. Both efforts were eventually abandoned.

Instead, it was decided to combine lock-follow and the Sutton switch into a new set, which began development in 1942. As part of a general reorganization of their radar efforts, the Army renamed the existing Mk. III sets as the AA No. 3 Mk. 1 for the Canadian sets and Mk. 2 for the UK versions. The new design was given the name AA No. 3 Mk. 4. (Note: AA No. 3 Mk. 3 was an SLC radar adapted as an expedient gun-laying system before the SCR-584's arrived. The saw service only for a short time.)

=== SCR-584 ===
By 1943, the US project had produced the SCR-584. Like the Mk. 4, it incorporated both the Sutton tube and a lock-follow system. However, it also included a search feature that spun the antenna and produced a plan-position indicator display, allowing a second operator to look for new targets anywhere within about 30 miles (48 km) before handing off a selected target to the tracking operator.

The SCR-584 was originally expected in late 1943, before the Mk. 4, which was then put on low-priority development. However, the sets did not begin to arrive in significant numbers until the middle of 1944. As the delays grew, the Mk. 4 was put back into full development, and the first prototypes began to arrive in 1944, just as the supply of the SCR-584 improved. Development was once again curtailed.

This all proved to be lucky timing, as the arrival of production SCR-584s was coincident with the start of the V-1 flying bomb campaign that summer. The combination of the SCR-584, the proximity fuse and new electro-mechanical predictors like the M-9 dramatically increased the effectiveness of anti-aircraft artillery, and they proved to be a very effective weapon against the high-speed V-1's.

=== Mk. 7 ===
While the SCR-584 was an enormous advance on previous systems, it was also large and somewhat cumbersome. In the immediate post-war era, the magnetron saw rapid development and improvement, and new vacuum tubes were becoming widely available that combined multiple tubes into one. It was decided to re-engineer the Mk. 4 concepts with these new technologies, resulting in the Mk. 7 effort, which started in

The Mk. 7 was very similar to the SCR-584 conceptually but had a number of practical improvements. One was to use a parabolic reflector made of fibreglass instead of metal, featuring a ridge around the outside edge to provide stiffness. This resulted in a lighter antenna overall, thereby reducing the weight of the supporting elements as well. As a result of these changes, the Mk. 7 was able to be packed into a small trailer roughly half the size and weight of the SCR-584.

Like most post-war Army projects, development of the Mk. 7 took place at a snail's pace. Estimates that another war would be at least ten years off suggested no major production should take place, as developments in the interim would render any radars built in that period obsolete. However, various events in 1949, notably the first Soviet atomic test, led to sweeping upgrades, including the first contract for production Mk. 7's. These began to arrive in 1952.

== Other users ==
=== Switzerland ===
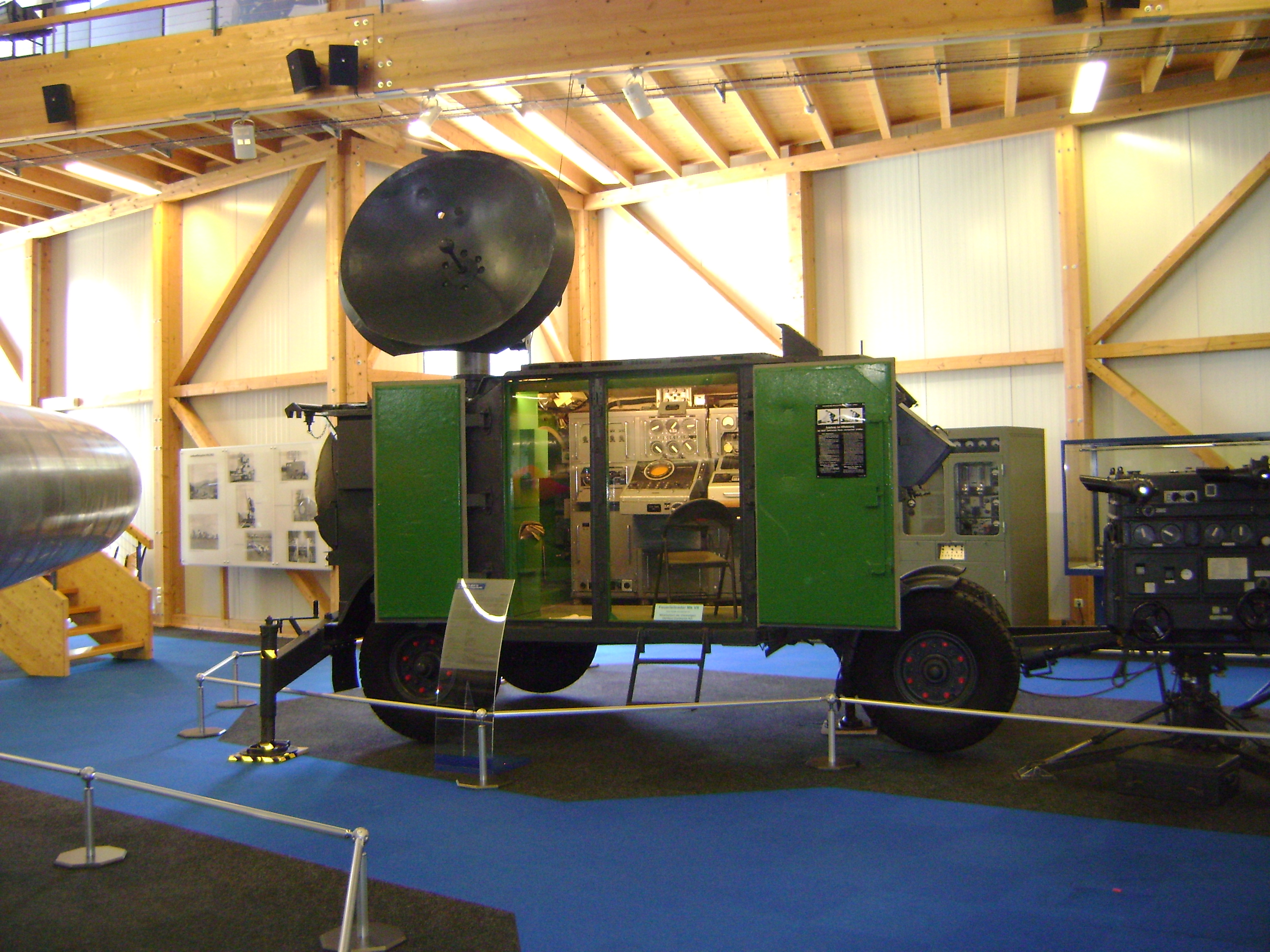
Feuerleitradar Mark VII at the Flieger-Flab-Museum at the Dübendorf Air Base. The 43/50R predictor is on the right.

The Swiss Air Force received twelve Mk. 7's in 1958, which they referred to as Feuerleitradar ("fire control radar") Mark VII. They combined them with their own predictor, the Hasler-built Kommandogerät ("command device") 43/50R. (Note: From outward appearance, the 43/50R appears to be a Kerrison Predictor.) Like its British counterpart, the 43/50R could be fed information directly from the Mk. 7 and in turn feed the guns. They also sometimes paired the Mk. 7 with the US-built AN/TPS-1 tactical control radar for initial cueing. The Mk. 7 began to be replaced in 1965 by the Oerlikon Contraves Super Fledermaus.

Australian Army Operated a number of these in the various locations around Australia 3 were modified by RAEME to be used as Mortar Locating Radars in the late 50's Early 60's a number were also modified to double the range and used during the trials at Woomera Rocket Range in South Australia on project they were used for was for the British Blue Streak Missile trials conducted there. The last use of them was pre Vietnam War by 131 Div Locating Battery at North Head ans were replaces by the US Army's ANKPQ-1.

== Specification ==
- 5 ft (1.5 m) diameter parabolic dish antenna rotating at 20 revolutions per minute.
- Elevation scan completed every 4 seconds
- Detection range 950–36,000 yd (0.9–32.9 km)
- Operating in S band 3.0 to 3.1 GHz
- 200 kW peak power.
- Powered by a Lister/Tilling-Stevens 17kVA diesel generator set housed in a separate trailer.
- Weight was about 5.125 short tons (4.576 long tons; 4.649 t).
- Height: 3.43 m
- Length: 5.75 m
- Width: 2.3 m
