= General der Luftnachrichtentruppe =

WW2-era German branch general rank

General of the Air Communications Troop General der Luftnachrichtentruppe
- Collar patch and flying suit insignia

- Luftwaffe shoulder board
- Country: Nazi Germany
- Service branch: Luftwaffe
- Rank: Three-star
- NATO rank code: OF-8
- Non-NATO rank: O-9
- Next higher rank: Generaloberst
- Next lower rank: Generalleutnant
- Equivalent ranks: See list

General der Luftnachrichtentruppe (en: General of air force communications troops) was a General of the branch rank of the Deutsche Luftwaffe (en: German Air Force) in Nazi Germany. Until the end of World War II in 1945, this particular general officer rank was on three-star level (OF-8), equivalent to a US Lieutenant general.

The "General of the branch" ranks of the Luftwaffe were in 1945:

- General of parachute troops
- General of anti-aircraft artillery
- General of the aviators
- General of air force communications troops
- General of the air force

The rank was equivalent to the General of the branch ranks of the Heer (army) as follows:

Heer

- General of artillery
- General of mountain troops
- General of infantry
- General of cavalry
- General of the communications troops
- General of panzer troops (armoured troops)
- General of engineers
- General of the medical corps
- General of the veterinary corps

| junior Rank; Generalleutnant | (German officer rank); General der Luftnachrichtentruppe | senior Rank; Generaloberst |

Other services

The rank was also equivalent to the German three-star ranks:

- Admiral of the Kriegsmarine, equivalent to (US Vice admiral) and
- SS-Obergruppenführer und General der Waffen-SS in the Waffen-SS.

== Officers in this rank ==
| Name | Dates of life | Promotion | Remark |
|---|---|---|---|
| Friedrich Fahnert | 1879–1964 | April 1, 1945 | higher commander of the Luftnachrichtenstab in Halle (Saale) |
| Wolfgang Martini | 1891–1963 | 1941 | expert to German radar technology |
| Walter Surén | 1880–1976 | January 30, 1945 | Signals-Leader of the Luftwaffe in the RLM |

== See also ==
- Comparative officer ranks of World War II
