= Wolfgang Martini =

German general (1891–1963)

- Identity picture of Wolfgang Martini
- Born: 20 September 1891; Lissa, Posen, German Empire
- Died: 6 January 1963 (aged 71); Düsseldorf, West Germany
- Military career
- Allegiance: German Empire (to 1918); Weimar Republic (to 1933); Nazi Germany
- Branch: Luftwaffe
- Service years: 1910–1945
- Rank: General der Luftnachrichtentruppe
- Conflicts: World War I World War II

Wolfgang Martini (20 September 1891 – 6 January 1963) was a German Air Force general who played a key role in promoting the early development and use of radar in Germany.

== Early career ==
While attending the gymnasium in his hometown of Lissa in the Province of Posen, Martini became a radio enthusiast. When he graduated in 1910, he joined the Imperial German Army as a cadet, and his proficiency in radio communication led him to be promoted to a lieutenant and then company commander in a telegraph battalion. During World War I, he had a number of leadership positions in radio operations, being promoted to first lieutenant and then captain. At the end of the war, he was responsible for radio affairs in the Grand Headquarters and commander of the Army Signals School at Namur in occupied Belgium.

After the Treaty of Versailles was signed in 1919, Martini was one of the few officers allowed to remain in the Army. For the next five years, he served as a signals instructor at several Army schools, and then from 1924 to 1928, he was the Signals Staff Officer with a District Command. In 1928–1929, he participated in the secret Soviet–German Lipetsk fighter-pilot school in Soviet Russia. Between 1928 and 1933, he was promoted to major and served as a radio specialist with the Reich Defence Ministry.

== Lieutenant colonel to general ==
Upon the formation of the Luftwaffe in 1933, Martini transferred to the new arm and soon became the Chief of the Board of Radio Affairs. He conceived and set up the Luftwaffe Luftnachrichten Abteilung 350, the Air Signals Corps in 1936. In 1938, he was promoted to major general and named Chief of Signal Affairs of the Luftwaffe. Martini was elevated to General der Luftnachrichtentruppe (en: General of air force communications troops) in 1941, and remained in this position until the end of the war in May 1945.

== Involvement with GEMA and wartime activities ==
In the mid-1930s, the company Gesellschaft für Electroakustische und Mechanische Apparate (GEMA) started the development of a Funkmessgerät (radio indicator), as the British and the Americans did at the same time. The pulse-modulated system was based on earlier work of Rudolf Kühnhold, a scientist with the Kriegsmarine (German navy), and was done in the extremely classified, not even informing the other armed forces of its existence.

GEMA's product, an early-warning system code-named Seetakt, was eventually demonstrated to the Luftwaffe General Staff in November 1938. Martini attended the presentation and immediately realised the military importance of the new technology. He ordered the development of a similar system (ultimately called Freya) for the Luftwaffe, and from this time on was the primary promoter of radar technology in the German High Command. In May and August 1939, he initiated two signals intelligence flights of the LZ 130 Graf Zeppelin along the British East coast to verify suspicions of a British radar equivalent to the German one. However, the British operated their Chain Home early warning radar with lower frequencies, which the Germans thought to be outdated and thus the first British operational radar was not detected by the German signals intelligence.

Beginning in 1941, in addition to other duties, he was named the High Command's responsible for German radar technology. Although not academically trained, his grasp of this technology was intuitive, and his involvement was perhaps the greatest impetus to the development of wartime radar in Germany.

In most of his activities, Martini reported directly to Hermann Göring, commander of the Luftwaffe, but Göring never fully trusted him and the two often clashed over technical decisions. For example, as British radar became known to the Germans through Martini's signals intelligence, they violently disagreed as to its importance. Concerning this, Göring had told other commanders that Martini was a fool, “It was the same with all specialists; they exaggerate the importance of whatever they are working on.”

== Post-war activities ==
Following the war, Wolfgang Martini, like other officers at his level, was held in custody by the United States and then the United Kingdom until 1947; however, no charges were ever placed against him. For some time, he was engaged as a consultant to the radio equipment firm of C. Lorenz AG in Stuttgart. Beginning with the formation of the West German armed forces Martini served as a civilian advisor with the new Air Force in 1956, and later with NATO.

In late 1944, fearful that records of wartime radar development would be destroyed or lost after the eventual surrender of Germany, General Martini and Leo Brandt of GEMA had key documents buried in a waterproof metal casket. In the early 1950s, Martini recovered the casket from what was then the Soviet occupied German Democratic Republic. Then, for several years, the recovered documents were published in papers and conferences. In 1951, Martini was one of the founders of the Committee for Radiolocation Association in Düsseldorf (later becoming the German Society for Positioning and Navigation); much of the information from the buried documents was first released publicly at meetings of this committee. This helped to overcome the lag in West German research on radar and radio navigation after the war.

In these years, Martini established relationships with radar pioneers in several other countries. One of these, Sir Robert Watson-Watt, considered “the father of British radar,” included the following in his 1959 autobiography:

I have a very dear postwar friend in General Wolfgang Martini, a shy, modest, charming, and very perfect gentleman ... His many claims on my affectionate respect include his failure to endear himself to Göring, from whom the qualities I have just tried to summarize may have concealed General Martini’s very high technical competence, wisdom, and resource.

Martini died of a heart attack on January 6, 1963, in Düsseldorf.

== Awards ==
- Knights Cross of the War Merit Cross with Swords (February 1945)
- Grand Cross of the Order of Merit of the Federal Republic of Germany (Große Bundesverdienstkreuz)
- 1959, Honorary Doctorate in Engineering from Hanover (1962)
- 1941, the Lifesaving Medal (Prussia) on the Band (February 1944)
- Honorary member of the British Institute of Navigation at the Royal Geographical Society (1961)
- General Martini barracks in Osnabrück named after him

== Sources ==
- Brown, Louis; A Radar History of World War II, Inst. of Physics Publishing, 1999
- Guerlac, Henry E; Radar in World War II, vol. 8 in the series The History of Modern Physics 1800-1950, American Inst. of Physics, 1987
- Hoffmann, Karl Otto (1990). "Martini, Wolfgang". Neue Deutsche Biographie (in German). Vol. 16. Berlin: Duncker & Humblot. pp. 301–302. (full text online).
- Kummritz, H. “German radar development up to 1945,” in Radar Development to 1945, edited by Russell Burns, Peter Peregrinus Ltd, 1988
- Trenkle, Fritz; Die deutschen Funkmessverfahren bis 1945 (The German radar procedures until 1945), in German, Motorbuch Verlag, 1978
- Watson, Raymond C. Jr.; Radar Origins Worldwide, Trafford Publishing, 2009 (online at Google Books)
