= Kurt Lottner =

- Born: 30 October 1899; Hamm
- Died: 15 March 1957 (aged 57); Bad Schwartau
- Military career
- Allegiance: Nazi Germany
- Branch: Army (Wehrmacht)
- Rank: Generalmajor
- Commands: Commandant of Lübeck
- Conflicts: World War II
- Awards: Knight's Cross of the Iron Cross

Kurt Lottner (30 October 1899 – 15 March 1957) was a German general during World War II. He was a recipient of the Knight's Cross of the Iron Cross of Nazi Germany.

Lottner was Kampfkommandant of Lübeck in April/May 1945. On 2 May, British troops prepared to conquer Lübeck. Lottner, NSDAP-Kreisleiter Bernhard Clausen, mayor Otto-Heinrich Drechsler, Police chief Walther Schröder and officers in place agreed that a fight against the advancing 11th Armoured Division was senseless. They gave orders to remove the explosive charges already put in place at bridges and harbour facilities.

== Awards and decorations ==
- Knight's Cross of the Iron Cross on 14 October 1943 as Oberst and commander of Infanterie-Regiment 111
