= Military medicine =

Medicine concerning military personnel and operations

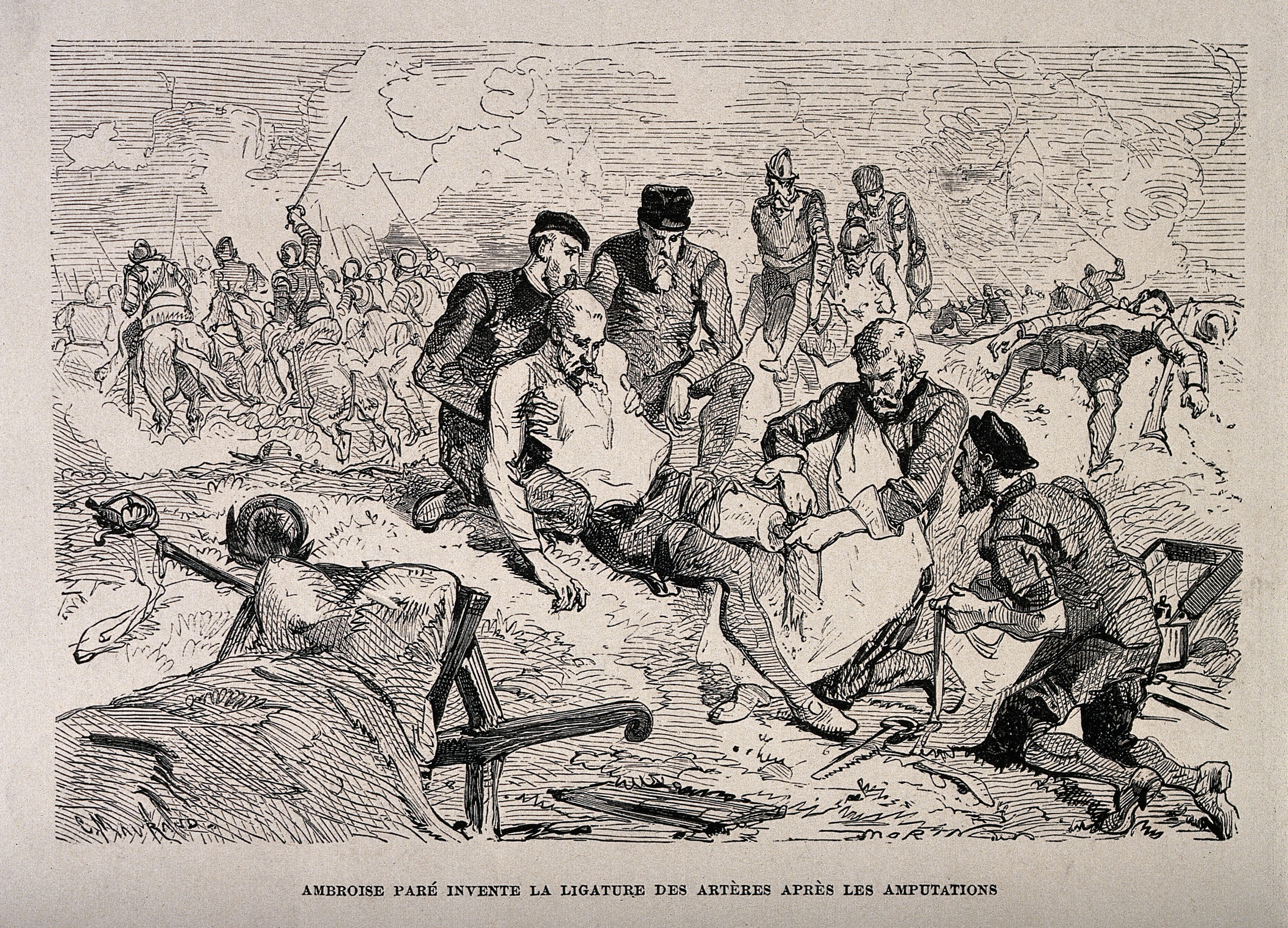
French surgeon Ambroise Paré (c. 1510–1590) – known as the "Father of Military Medicine" – attending to a soldier's amputated leg.

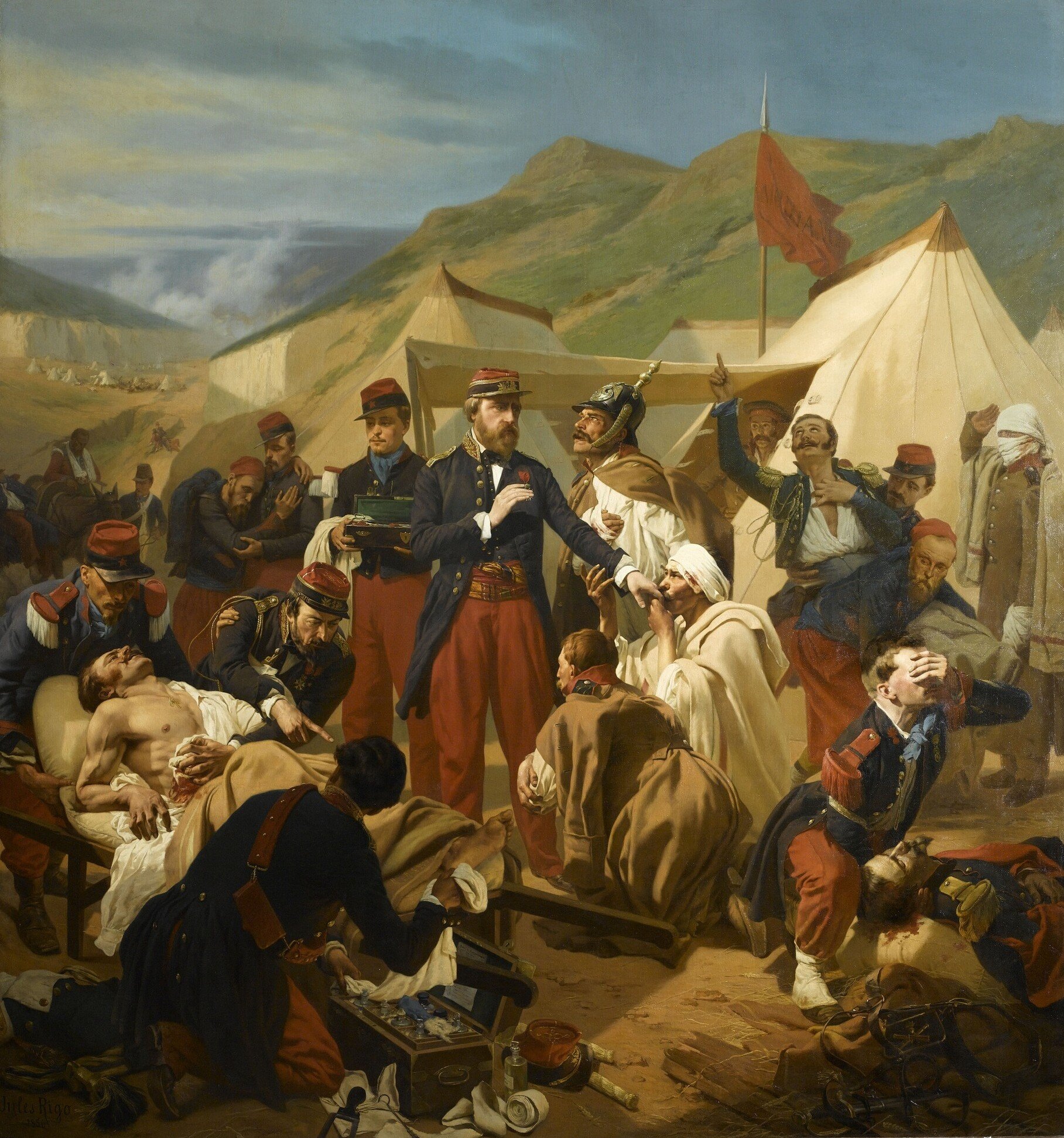
Two French military surgeons treating wounded enemies after the battle of Inkermann, November 5, 1854.

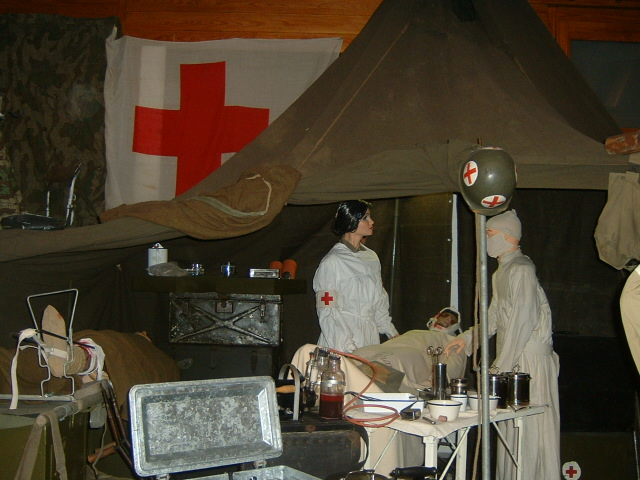
WWII era field hospital re-created operating tent using puppets, Diekirch Military Museum, Luxembourg

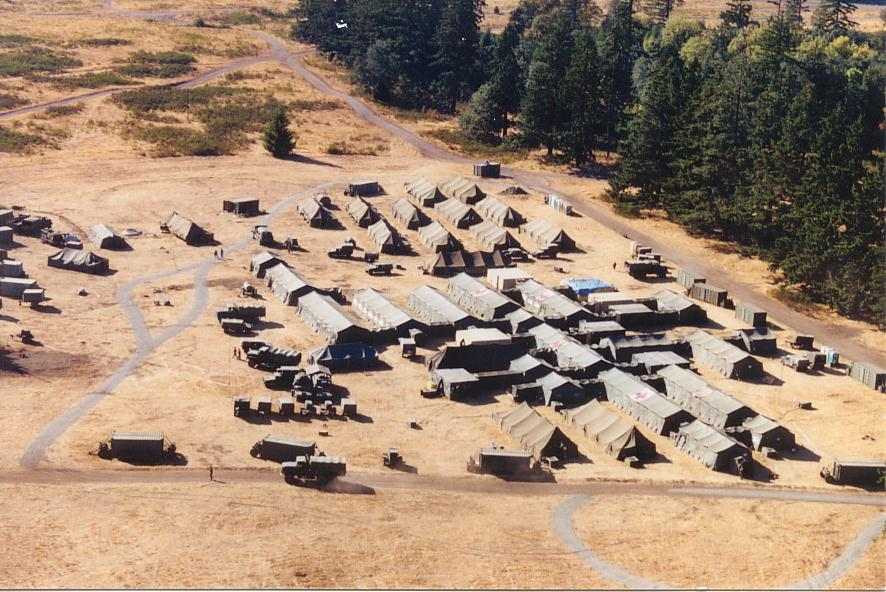
A U.S. Combat Support Hospital (CSH), a type of mobile field hospital, used in war or disasters; successor to the Mobile Army Surgical Hospital (MASH)

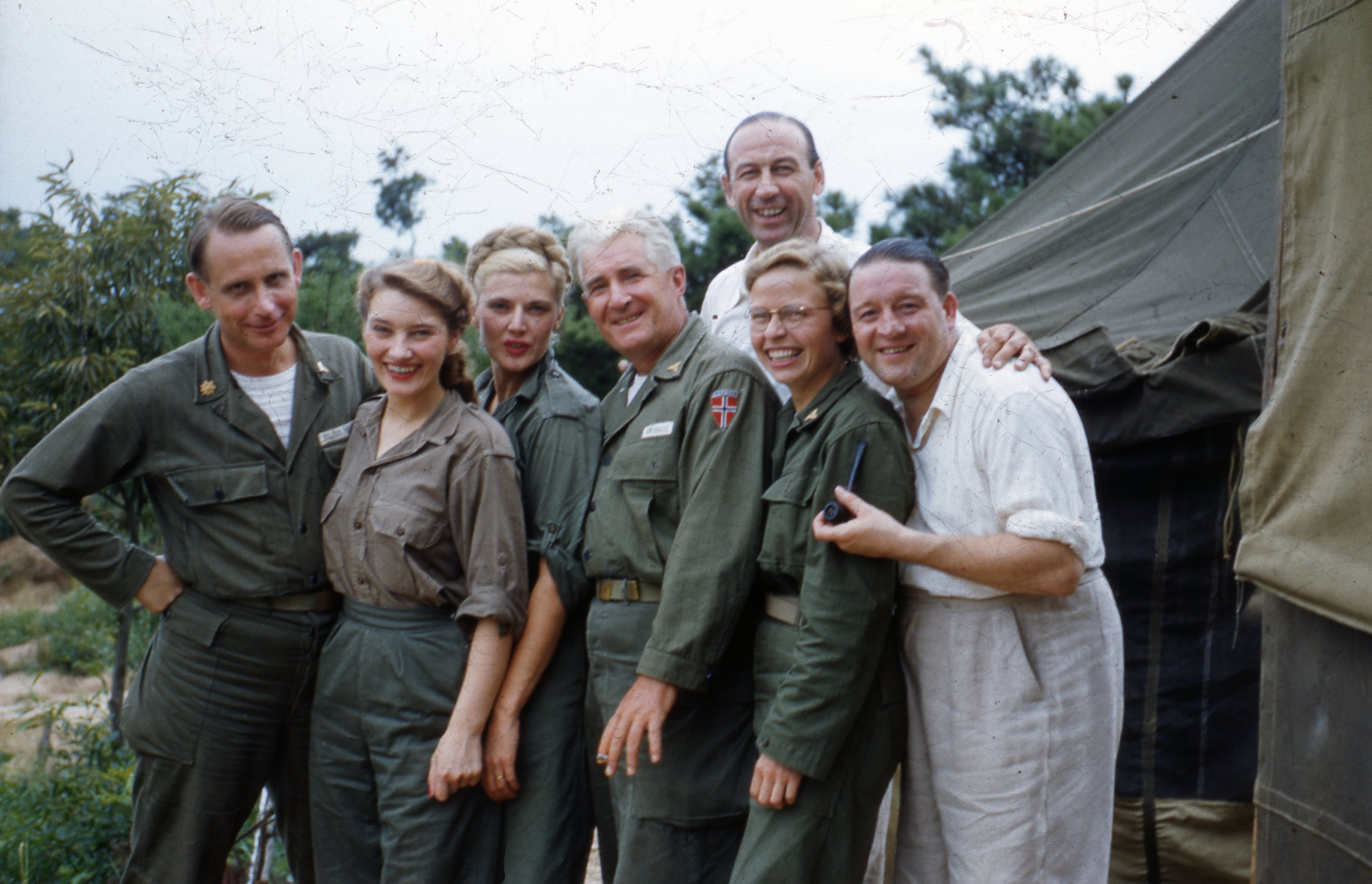
Norwegian NORMASH personnel during the Korean War

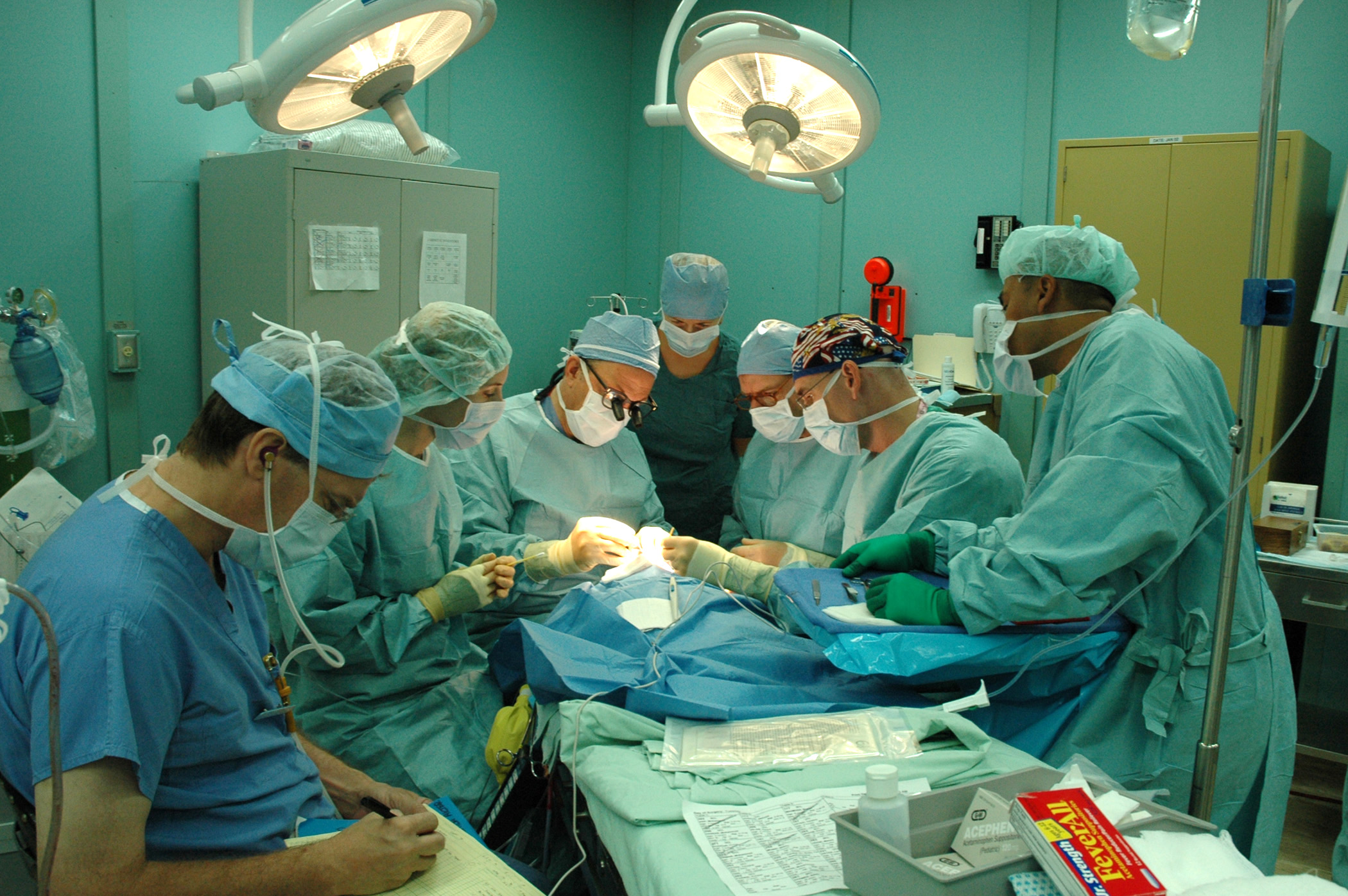
Medical staff aboard the US hospital ship USNS Mercy

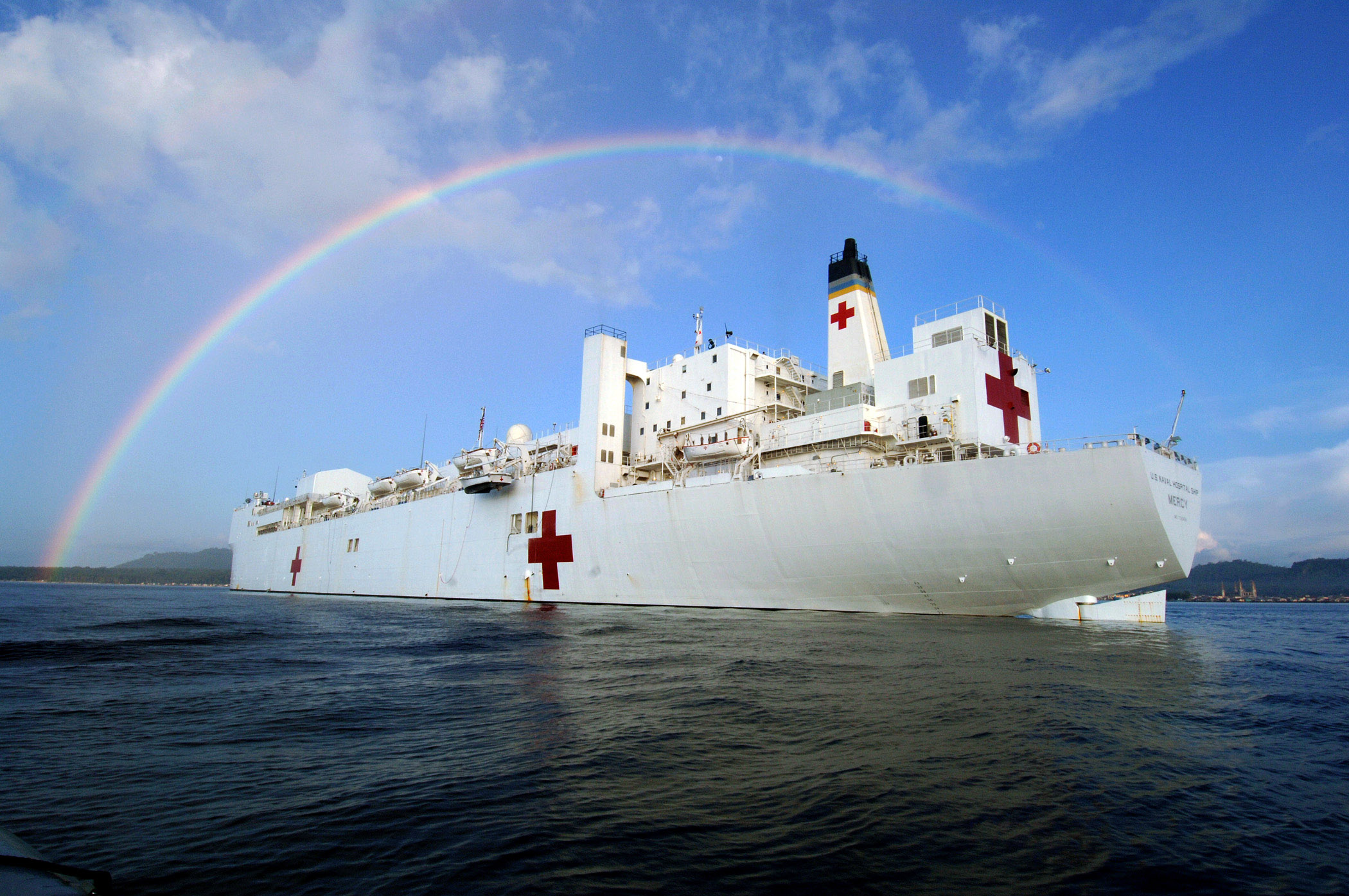
The US hospital ship USNS Mercy marked with the red cross, the international protective sign

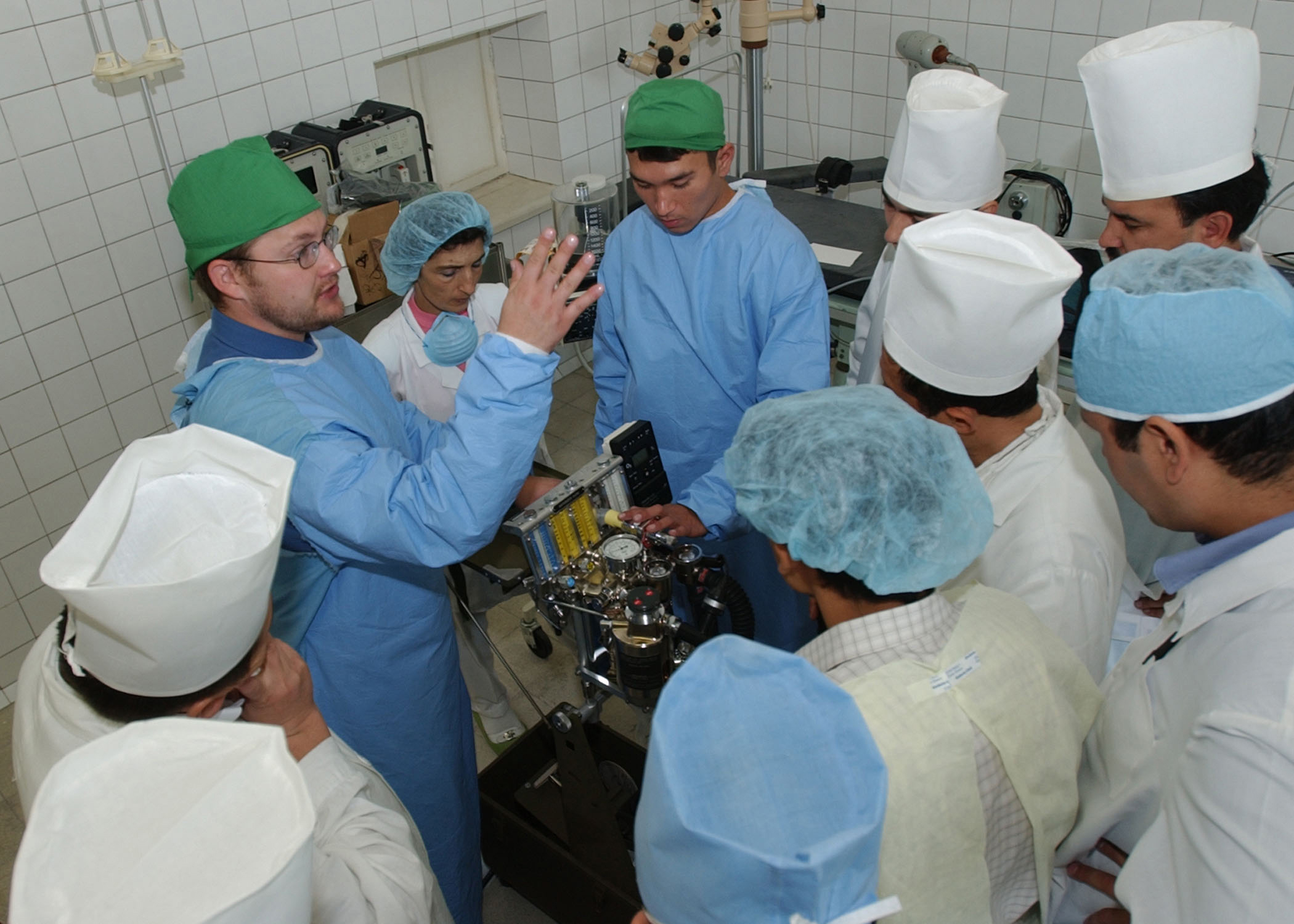
U.S. Army medical personnel train local Uzbek anesthesia providers at the Fergana Emergency Center in support of Operation Provide Hope.

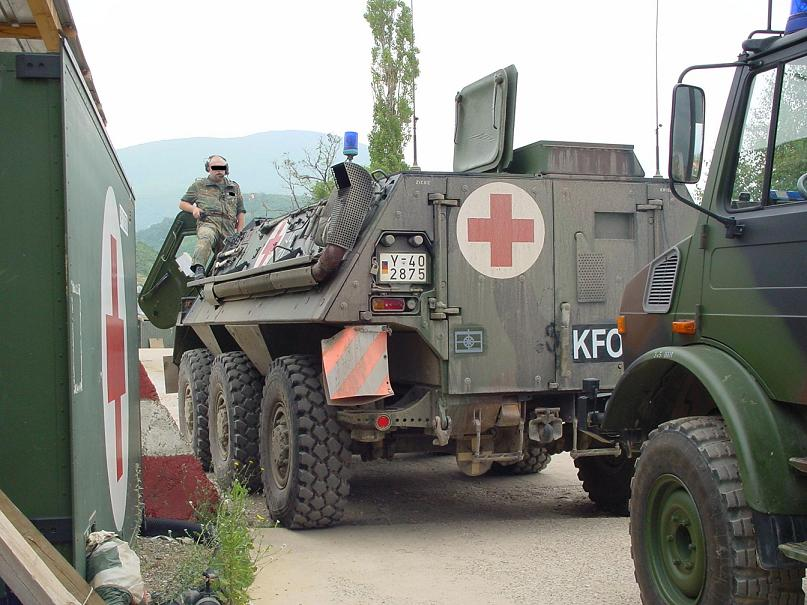
German Kosovo Force armoured medical transport, marked with the protective sign

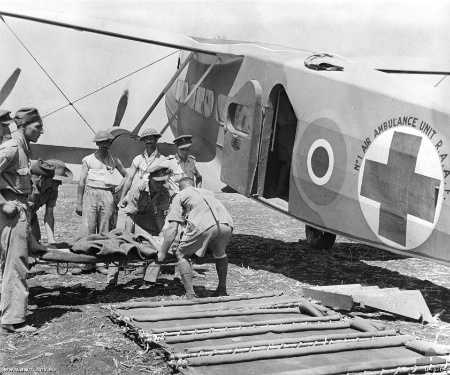
Air ambulance of the Royal Australian Air Force in 1943, marked with the protective sign

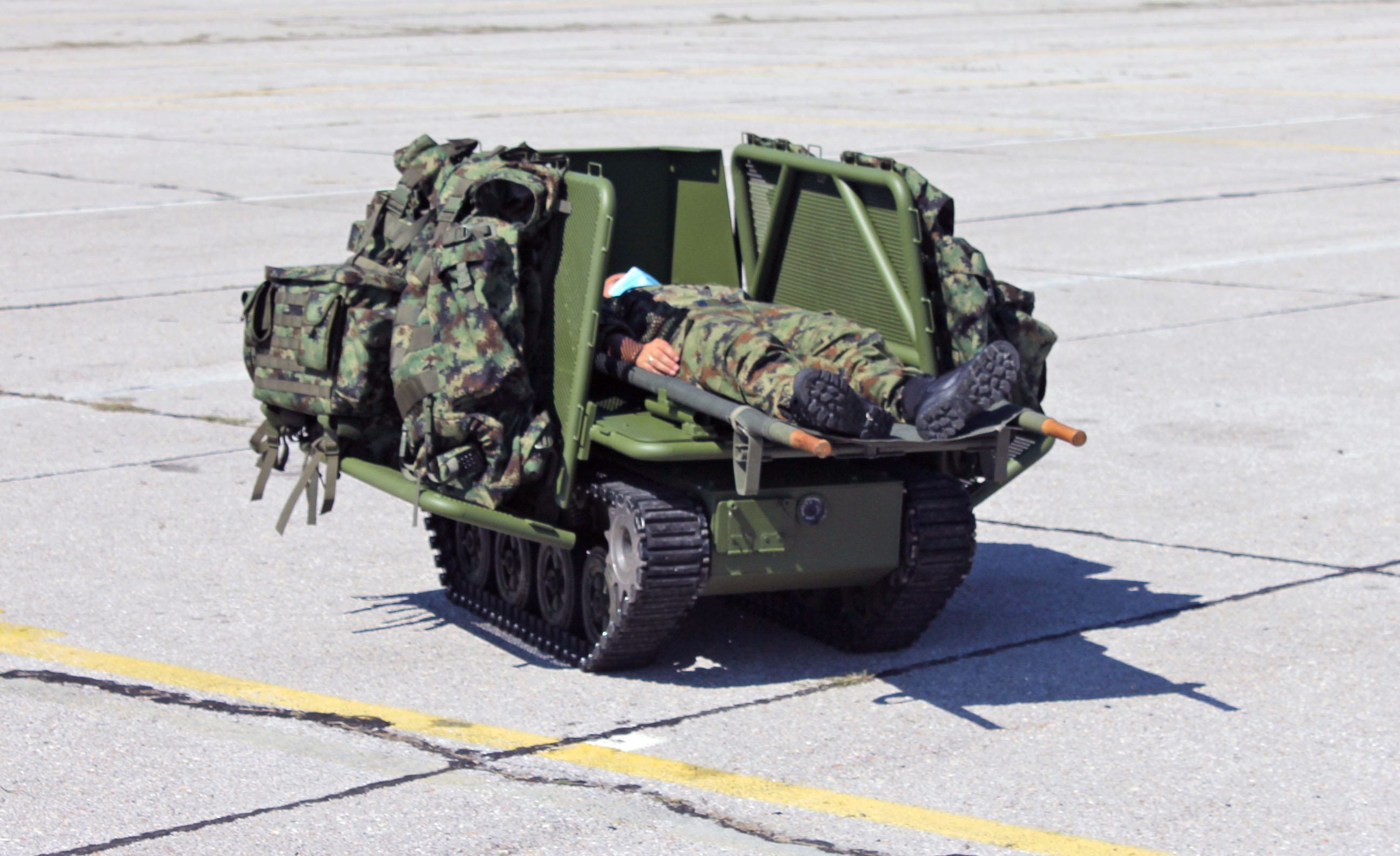
Miloš L (UGV), a military robot for evacuating the wounded from the battlefield.

The term military medicine has a number of potential connotations. It may mean:

- A medical specialty, specifically a branch of occupational medicine attending to the medical risks and needs (both preventive and interventional) of soldiers, sailors and other service members. This disparate arena has historically involved the prevention and treatment of infectious diseases (especially tropical diseases), and, in the 20th century, the ergonomics and health effects of operating military-specific machines and equipment such as submarines, tanks, helicopters and airplanes. Undersea and aviation medicine can be understood as subspecialties of military medicine, or in any case originated as such. Few countries certify or recognize "military medicine" as a formal speciality or subspeciality in its own right.
- The planning and practice of the surgical management of mass battlefield casualties and the logistical and administrative considerations of establishing and operating combat support hospitals. This involves military medical hierarchies, especially the organization of structured medical command and administrative systems that interact with and support deployed combat units. (See Battlefield medicine.)
- The administration and practice of health care for military service members and their dependents in non-deployed (peacetime) settings. This may (as in the United States) consist of a medical system paralleling all the medical specialties and sub-specialties that exist in the civilian sector. (See also Veterans Health Administration which serves U.S. veterans.)
- Medical research and development specifically bearing upon problems of military medical interest. Historically, this encompasses all of the medical advances emerging from medical research efforts directed at addressing the problems encountered by deployed military forces (e.g., vaccines or drugs for soldiers, medical evacuation systems, drinking water chlorination, etc.) many of which ultimately prove important beyond the purely military considerations that inspired them.

== Legal status ==
Military medical personnel engage in humanitarian work and are "protected persons" under international humanitarian law in accordance with the First and Second Geneva Conventions and their Additional Protocols, which established legally binding rules guaranteeing neutrality and protection for wounded soldiers, field or ship's medical personnel, and specific humanitarian institutions in an armed conflict. International humanitarian law makes no distinction between medical personnel who are members of the armed forces (and who hold military ranks) and those who are civilian volunteers. All medical personnel are considered non-combatants under international humanitarian law because of their humanitarian duties, and they may not be attacked and not be taken as prisoners of war; hospitals and other medical facilities and transports identified as such, whether they are military or civilian, may not be attacked either. The red cross, the red crescent and the red crystal are the protective signs recognised under international humanitarian law, and are used by military medical personnel and facilities for this purpose. Attacking military medical personnel, patients in their care, or medical facilities or transports legitimately marked as such is a war crime. Likewise, misusing these protective signs to mask military operations is the war crime of perfidy. Military medical personnel may be armed, usually with service pistols, for the purpose of self defense or the defense of patients.

== Historical significance ==
The significance of military medicine for combat strength goes far beyond treatment of battlefield injuries; in every major war fought until the late 19th century disease claimed more soldier casualties than did enemy action. During the American Civil War (1860–65), for example, about twice as many soldiers died of disease as were killed or mortally wounded in combat. The Franco-Prussian War (1870–71) is considered to have been the first conflict in which combat injury exceeded disease, at least in the German coalition army which lost 3.47% of its average headcount to combat and only 1.82% to disease. In new world countries, such as Australia, New Zealand, the United States and Canada, military physicians and surgeons contributed significantly to the development of civilian health care.

Improvements in military medicine have increased the survival rates in successive wars, due to improvements in medical evacuation, battlefield medicine and trauma care. Similar improvements have been seen in trauma practices during the Iraq war. Some military trauma care practices are disseminated by citizen soldiers who return to civilian practice. One such practice is where major trauma patients are transferred to an operating theater as soon as possible, to stop internal bleeding, increasing the survival rate. Within the United States, the survival rate for gunshot wounds has increased, leading to apparent declines in the gun death rate in states that have stable rates of gunshot hospitalizations.

In many English-speaking countries the military title of surgeon is applied to any medical practitioner, due to the historical evolution of the term. The US Army Medical Corps retains various surgeon United States military occupation codes in the ranks of officer pay grades, for military personnel dedicated to performing surgery on wounded soldiers.

== Impact ==
According to a 2025 study, which examined inter-state wars from 1900 onwards, found that militaries that have better military medicine have improved military effectiveness.

== Military medicine by country ==
=== North America ===
==== Canada ====
- Royal Canadian Medical Service
- Royal Canadian Dental Corps
- Canadian Forces Health Services Group
- Surgeon General (Canada)
- National Defence Medical Centre

==== United States ====
- Assistant Secretary of Defense for Health Affairs
- Military Health System
- Military Medicine, academic journal
- TRICARE
- United States Unified Medical Command
- Uniformed Services University of the Health Sciences
- Medical Education and Training Campus
- Henry M. Jackson Foundation for the Advancement of Military Medicine
- Defense Health Agency
- National Center for Medical Intelligence
- Health Professions Scholarship Program
- Joint Task Force National Capital Region/Medical
- Alexander T. Augusta Military Medical Center
- Association of Military Surgeons of the United States
- Tactical Combat Casualty Care
- Armed Forces Institute of Pathology
- Armed Forces Radiobiology Research Institute
- Defense Health Program Budget Activity Group
- Department of Defense Medical Examination Review Board
- National Museum of Health and Medicine
- Medicine in the American Civil War
- National Museum of Civil War Medicine

U.S. Army

- Surgeon General of the U.S. Army
- Army Medical Department
- Battalion Aid Station
- Borden Institute
- Combat Support Hospital
- Fort Detrick
- Fort Sam Houston
- Forward Surgical Teams
- United States Army Medical Corps
- United States Army Nurse Corps
- United States Army Veterinary Corps
- Mobile Army Surgical Hospital
- Portable Surgical Hospital
- 68W, the "combat medic"
- Combat Medical Badge
- Expert Field Medical Badge
- Textbook of Military Medicine published by the U.S. Army
- United States Army Medical Department Center and School
- United States Army Medical Department Museum
- U.S. Army Dental Command
- U.S. Army Medical Command
- United States Army Medical Research and Development Command
- United States Army Medical Research Institute of Infectious Diseases
- United States Army Medical Command, Vietnam
- United States Army Medical Command, Europe
- Walter Reed Army Medical Center
- Walter Reed Army Institute of Research
- U.S. Army Public Health Center
- Army Medical School
- United States Army Health Services Command
- Army Medical Museum and Library
- Army Medical Department regimental coat of arms
- Combat lifesaver course

U.S. Navy

- Surgeon General of the U.S. Navy
- Bureau of Medicine and Surgery
- United States Navy Health Care
- U.S. Navy Medical Corps
- U.S. Navy Dental Corps
- U.S. Navy Nurse Corps
- U.S. Navy Medical Service Corps
- U.S. Navy Hospital Corpsman
- United States Naval Hospital (disambiguation)
- Special amphibious reconnaissance corpsman
- Battalion Aid Station
- Naval Hospital Corps School
- Naval Medical Center San Diego
- Naval Medical Center Portsmouth
- National Naval Medical Center (Walter Reed National Military Medical Center)
- Naval Hospital Yokosuka Japan
- Naval Hospital Guam
- Naval Health Clinic New England
- Naval Health Clinic Cherry Point
- Naval Medical Research Command
- Naval Health Research Center
- Naval Medical Forces Atlantic
- Naval Medical Research Unit South
- Naval Medical Research Unit Dayton
- Naval Submarine Medical Research Laboratory
- Charleston Naval Hospital Historic District
- Old Naval Observatory
- Hospital ship
- USNS Mercy
- USNS Comfort
- Sick bay
- Loblolly boy
- Diving medicine
- United States Navy staff corps

U.S. Air Force

- Surgeon General of the U.S. Air Force
- U.S. Air Force Medical Service (including Dental Corps, Medical Corps, Nursing Corps, and other corps)
- United States Air Force Nurse Corps
- United States Air Force Pararescue
- United States Air Force School of Aerospace Medicine
- Museum of Aerospace Medicine
- Aeromedical evacuation
- Critical Care Air Transport Team
- Expeditionary Medical Support System
- Aviation medicine

=== Europe ===
==== France ====
- French Defence Health Service
- École du service de santé des armées

==== Belgium ====
- Belgian Medical Component

==== Germany ====
- Bundeswehr Joint Medical Service
- Bundeswehr Medical Academy
- Luftwaffe Institute of Aviation Medicine
- Naval Medical Institute
- Generaloberstabsarzt
- Generalstabsarzt
- Generalarzt
- Oberstarzt
- Oberfeldarzt
- Oberstabsarzt
- Stabsarzt
- Oberarzt (military)
- Assistenzarzt (military)

==== Italy ====
- Corpo sanitario dell'Esercito Italiano
- Corpo sanitario militare marittimo
- Corpo sanitario aeronautico
- Servizio sanitario dell'Arma dei carabinieri

==== Russia ====
- Main Military Medical Directorate
- Kirov Military Medical Academy (founded in 1798)
- Military academies in Russia#Kuybyshev Military Medical Academy
- Military Medical Business, academic journal
- Russian Museum of Military Medicine

==== Serbia ====
- Military Medical Academy

==== Sweden ====
- Surgeon-General of the Swedish Armed Forces
- Medical Corps of the Swedish Armed Forces
- Swedish Armed Forces Centre for Defence Medicine
- Surgeon-in-Chief of the Swedish Army
- Surgeon-in-Chief of the Swedish Navy
- Surgeon-in-Chief of the Swedish Air Force
- Swedish Army Medical Corps
- Swedish Naval Medical Officers' Corps
- Swedish Armed Forces Diving and Naval Medicine Centre
- Swedish Army Veterinary Corps

==== United Kingdom ====
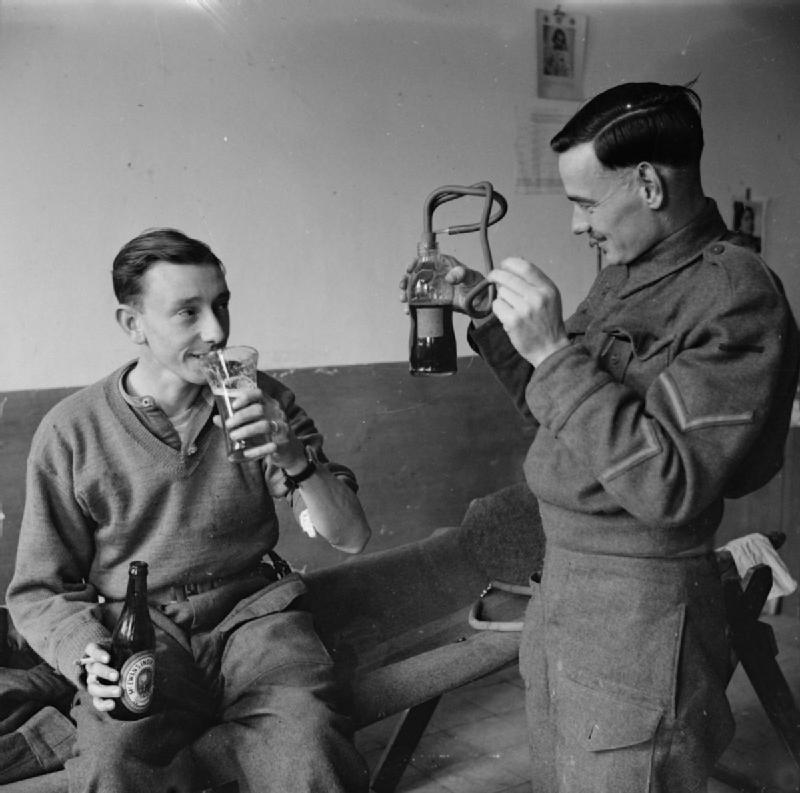
A British soldier enjoying a beer after donating at a blood bank, Italy 1943

- Royal Navy Medical Service
- Royal Naval Hospital
- Queen Alexandra's Royal Naval Nursing Service
- Medical Assistant (Royal Navy)
- Institute of Naval Medicine
- Naval surgeon
- Surgeon's mate
- Loblolly boy
- Journal of the Royal Naval Medical Service
- List of hospitals and hospital ships of the Royal Navy
- Army Medical Services
- Royal Army Medical Corps
- Royal Army Dental Corps
- Royal Army Veterinary Corps
- Queen Alexandra's Royal Army Nursing Corps
- Combat Medical Technician
- Medical Support Officer
- Regimental Aid Post
- Territorial Force Nursing Service
- Royal Army Medical College
- Museum of Military Medicine
- RAF Medical Services
- Princess Mary's Royal Air Force Nursing Service
- RAF Centre of Aviation Medicine
- RAF Institute of Aviation Medicine
- Surgeon-General (United Kingdom)
- Defence Medical Services
- Defence Medical Academy
- Ministry of Defence Hospital Units
- Defence CBRN Centre

=== Asia ===
==== India ====
- Director General Armed Forces Medical Services (India)
- Army Medical Corps (India)
- Armed Forces Medical College
- Command Hospital
- Army Hospital Research and Referral
- Military Hospitals

==== Israel ====
- Logistics, Medical, and the Centers Directorate
- Medical Corps (Israel)
- Unit 669

==== Sri Lanka ====
Sri Lanka Army Medical Corps

==== Thailand ====
Phramongkutklao College of Medicine

==== Vietnam ====
- Vietnam Military Medical University (Học Viện Quân Y) in Hanoi

=== Other regions ===
==== Australia ====
- Joint Health Command (Australia)
- Australian Army Medical Women's Service
- Australian Army Medical Units, World War I
- Australian Army Nursing Service
- Royal Australian Army Medical Corps
- Royal Australian Army Nursing Corps
- Royal Australian Army Dental Corps
- Australian Army Veterinary Corps
- Australian Army Psychology Corps
- Royal Australian Navy School of Underwater Medicine
- RAAF Institute of Aviation Medicine
- List of Australian hospital ships

==== South Africa ====
- South African Medical Service
- South African Military Health Service

=== International ===
- International Committee of Military Medicine
- Committee of Chiefs of Military Medical Services in NATO (COMEDS)

== See also ==
- Battlefield medicine
- Casualty evacuation (CASEVAC)
- Combat medic
- Combat stress reaction
- Disaster medicine
- Field hospital
- Flight nurse
- Flight medic
- Flight surgeon
- Equipment of a combat medic
- History of military nutrition in the United States
- List of drugs used by militaries
- Medical corps
- Medical evacuation (MEDEVAC)
- Medical Service Corps
- Medical logistics
- Military ambulance
- Military medical ethics
- Military hospital
- Military nurse
- Military psychiatrist
- Military psychiatry
- Military psychology
- Triage
- Stretcher bearer
