= Milling (military training exercise) =

Boxing session in the British army

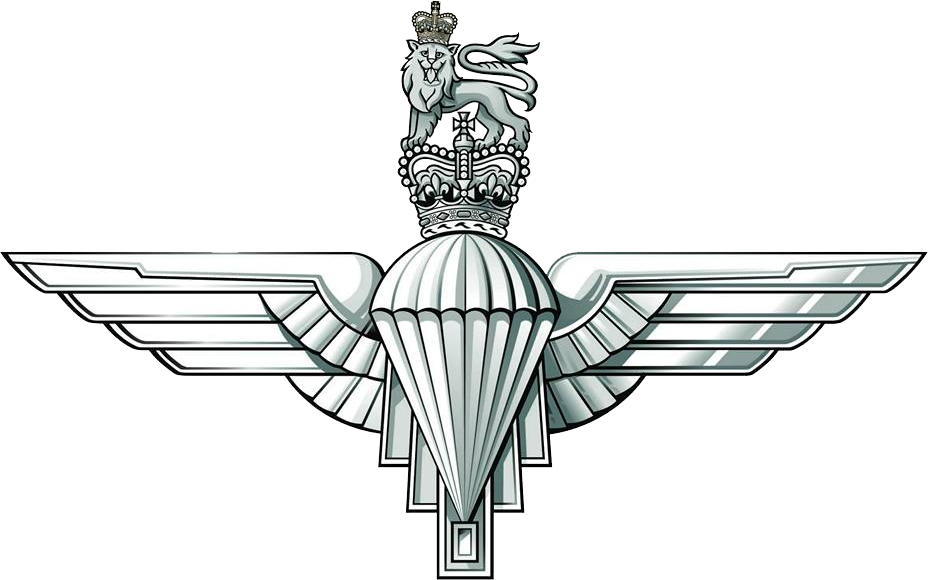
The emblem of the British Parachute Regiment

Milling is a training activity in the British airborne forces. For a fixed period, two opponents punch each other in the head as aggressively as possible without evasion.

== Use in training ==
Milling is a training activity used to assess candidates from age 17 for the elite Parachute Regiment of the British Army. It is one of eight physically-demanding assessment events carried out over four days.

An instructor in 2014 described milling as "arguably the most important event of the [training] course" and its "flagship event".

== Procedure ==
A square milling ring is formed by the seated trainee group, while an officer and two non-commissioned officers observe as judges from a raised platform. Trainees are paired by weight and issued with head guards, gumshields and 18oz boxing gloves.

Each pair are told to punch each other’s faces as furiously as possible for one minute: "You must aim to dominate your opponent with straight punches to the head."

Unlike boxing, it is forbidden: to pause in attacking the opponent; to aim at any part of the opponent other than the head; or to evade or block the opponent’s punches. The guidance notes state: "No ducking, parrying or other boxing defence moves are allowed." The clock is paused if a trainee is knocked down or if his nose is broken; any blood is wiped away by staff and the bout resumes.

Whereas in amateur boxing (Olympic boxing) the bout is normally awarded to the participant who scores the most hits against the opponent, a bout in milling is awarded to the most aggressive participant. The bouts are filmed (see below for examples) and trainees can buy the DVD as a souvenir.

== Purpose ==
According to the British Army, milling "replicates the conditions of stress and personal qualities required in a combat situation", and is "a test of courage, determination and raw fighting spirit".

A milling instructor said in 2014 that milling teaches recruits "to deliver maximum violence onto their opponent". He suggested that the ability to take and throw punches in milling is the same as the ability of soldiers to fire at an enemy when under fire themselves.

Briefing trainees before a milling session, Major Mark Swan said:

"Milling; the army medical services don't like it. Why do we do it? Some of you are going to go to Afghanistan fairly soon. Every ounce of your being will tell you to stay in cover; that's useless to us. We need men who are going to get in the fire position, look through their sights and engage the enemy."

Major Andrew Fox, former commander of 3 Para, called for a ban on milling in 2020, tweeting: 'Needlessly exposing recruits to head trauma... Time to leave this in the 1940s where it belongs.' The Times reported that he was widely abused online for his remarks.

== Injuries ==
Despite the intensity of milling, the British Army reported in March 2017 that there had been no medical appointments or medical discharges as a result of the activity in the previous five years. A civilian doctor overseeing a milling session said of the practice: "I am happy with the steps that have been put in place."

== Admission of women and girls ==
In 2016, Prime Minister David Cameron decided to admit women and girls from age 16 to the infantry from late 2018, including the Parachute Regiment from 2019. In 2017, The Sunday Times reported that females applying to the Regiment would be assessed on the same basis as males, and would be expected to fight in milling with men of similar size and weight:

Women wanting to join the British Army's elite Parachute Regiment will be expected to go toe to toe with men and trade punches for a minute.

== See also ==
- Recruit training
- P Company - UK Parachute Regiment training company
- British Army
- Drill instructor
- Amateur boxing
