= Medical assistant (disambiguation) =

A medical assistant is a category of healthcare workers who perform basic clinical and administrative support tasks.

Medical assistant may also refer to:

- Medical Assistant (Royal Navy), the Royal Navy rating for medical assistants in the United Kingdom
- Hospital Corpsman, the U.S. Navy grade for medical assistants
