= Loblolly =

Loblolly was a porridge or stew, coming to mean swamp. It is used in the names of:

- Loblolly pine (Pinus taeda), a tree
- Loblolly-bay (Gordonia lasianthus), a tree
- Loblolly boy, an assistant to a ship's surgeon
- Loblolly Stable, a horse breeding and racing stable in Arkansas, US
