= HSCP =

HSCP may refer to:

- Health and Social Care Partnership
- Health Services Collegiate Program, at United States Navy Health Care
- Harvard Studies in Classical Philology (or HSCPh).
