= Oberfeldarzt =

Oberfeldarzt (short: OFArzt or OFA) is a military rank in German speaking armed forces. It denotes a medical staff officer surgeon or medical staff officer dentist and is comparable in rank to lieutenant colonel (de: Oberstleutnant) or (naval) commander (de: Fregattenkapitän) NATO-Rangcode OF4 in anglophone armed forces.

Oberfeldarzt

Rank insignia
German medical service ranks
Introduction

Rank group
Commissioned officers
Army / Air Force
Oberfeldarzt (equiv. Oberstleutnant)
Navy
Flottillenarzt (equiv. Fregattenkapitän)
Short
OFArzt (OFA)
NATO
equivalent
OF-4

== Germany ==
=== Bundeswehr ===
In the Joint Medical Service of the German Bundeswehr Oberfeldarzt, Oberfeldapotheker, and Oberfeldveterinär are comparable in NATO to the OF-4 rank Oberstleutnant; Flottillenarzt, and Flottillenapotheker are equivalent in to the rank Fregattenkapitän, OF-4 as well.

==== Address ====
The manner of formal addressing of military surgeons/dentists with the rank Oberfeldarzt is "Herr/Frau Oberfeldarzt"; with the rank Oberfeldapotheker, "Herr/Frau Oberfeldapotheker". A Flottillenenarzt will be addressed "Herr/Frau Flottillenarzt"; and the Flottillenapotheker, "Herr/Frau Flottillenapotheker".

==== Rank insignias ====
On the shoulder straps (Heer, Luftwaffe) there are two silver stars in silver oak leaves and the career insignia (de: Laufbahnabzeichen) as symbol of the medical standing, or course of studies. The piping on shoulder straps shows the Waffenfarbe (en: corps- or troop-function colour), corresponding to the appropriate military service, branch, or special force. The corps colour of the "Bundeswehr Joint Medical Service" is dark blue.

In the Navy, the career insignia is in the middle of both sleeves, 3 cm above the cuff strips, and on the shoulder straps between strips and button.

Oberfeldarzt i.G. Oberfeldarzt (hum. medicine) Oberfeldarzt (dent. medicine) Oberfeldapotheker Oberfeldveterinär	Oberfeldarzt (hum.) Oberfeldapotheker

Human medicine Flottillenarzt Mounting loop Sleeve	Dentistry Flottillenarzt Sleeve	Pharmacy Mounting loop Sleeve

junior Rank; Oberstabsarzt	German medical officer rank Oberfeldarzt; Flottillenarzt	senior Rank; Oberstarzt; Flottenarzt

=== Wehrmacht ===
Rank insignia

Collar patches

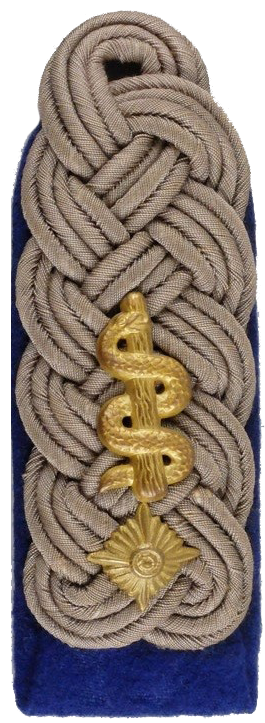
Oberfeldarzt

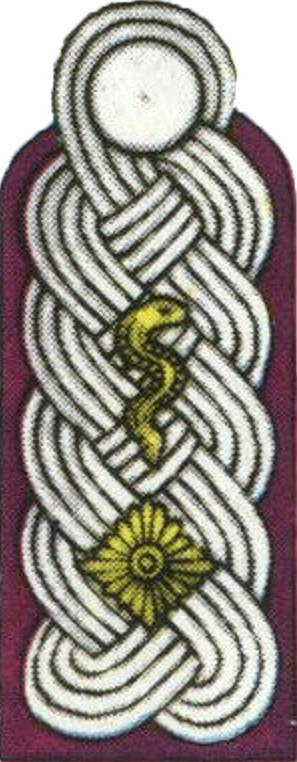
Oberfeldveterinär

Oberfeldarzt of the German Wehrmacht was comparable to the Oberstleutnant / Fregattenkapitän (OF-4), as well as to the Obersturmbannführer and Oberstleutnant of the Waffen-SS.

In line to the so-called Reichsbesoldungsordnung (en: Reich's salary order), appendixes to the Salary law of the German Empire (de: Besoldungsgesetz des Deutschen Reiches) of 1927 (changes 1937 – 1940), the comparative ranks were as follows: C 5

- Oberstleutnant (Heer and Luftwaffe)
- Fregattenkapitän (Kriegsmarine)
- Oberfeldarzt (medical service of the Wehrmacht)
- Geschwaderarzt, introduced on 26 June 1935 (medical service of the Kriegsmarine)
- Oberfeldveterinär from 1934 (veterinarian service of the Wehrmacht)

During wartime, regular assignments of Oberfeldarzt was chief of a, field-, evacuation-, or war hospital (de. Feldlazarett / Krieslazarett). However, a field hospital could be managed by an Oberstabsarzt (OF3) as well.

The corps colour of the military Health Service Support (HSS) in German armed forces was traditional dark bluedark blue, and of the veterinarian service carmine red. This tradition was continued by the medical service corps in Heer and Luftwaffe of the Reichswehr and Wehrmacht. However, the corps colour of the Waffen-SS and Kriegsmarine HSS was cornflower blue.

Ranks Wehrmacht until 1945				Ranks
Medical service	en translation	Equivalent Heer	en equivalent	Ranks
Generaloberstabsarzt	Senior Staff-Surgeon General	General der Waffengattung	three star rank	OF-8
Generalstabsarzt	Staff-Surgeon General	Generalleutnant	two star rank	OF-7
Generalarzt	Surgeon General	Generalmajor	one star rank	OF-6
Oberstarzt	Colonel (Dr.)	Oberst	Colonel	OF-5
Oberfeldarzt	Lieutenant colonel (Dr.)	Oberstleutnant	Lieutenant colonel	OF-4
Oberstabsarzt	Major (Dr.)	Major		OF-3
Stabsarzt	Captain (Dr.)	Hauptmann	Captain (army)	OF-2
Oberarzt	First lieutenant (Dr.)	Oberleutnant	First lieutenant	OF-1a
Assistenzarzt	Second lieutenant (Dr.)	Leutnant	Second lieutenant	OF-1b
Unterarzt	Sergeant 1st Class (Dr.)	Fahnenjunker-Oberfeldwebel	Officer Aspirant	OR-7
Feldunterarzt (since 1940)	Sergeant 1st Class (Dr.)	Fahnenjunker-Oberfeldwebel	Officer Aspirant	OR-7

=== Kriegsmarine ===
Geschwaderarzt

Sleeve lace

Kriegsmarine

Ranks Kriegsmarine (medical service)				Ranks
Medical service	en translation	Equivalent Kriegsmarine	en equivalent	Ranks
Admiraloberstabsarzt	Surgeon general	Admiral (Germany)	three star rank	OF-8
Admiralstabsarzt	Rear admiral upper half (Dr.)	Vizeadmiral	two star rank	OF-7
Admiralarzt	Rear admiral lower half (Dr.)	Konteradmiral	one star rank	OF-6
Flottenarzt	Captain naval (Dr.)	Kapitän zur See	Captain (naval)	OF-5
Geschwaderarzt	Commander (Dr.)	Fregattenkapitän	Commander	OF-4
Marineoberstabsarzt	Lieutenant commander (Dr.)	Korvettenkapitän	Lieutenant commander	OF-3
Marinestabsarzt	Lieutenant naval (Dr.)	Kapitänleutnant	Lieutenant (naval)	OF-2
Marineoberarzt	Lieutenant junior grade (Dr.)	Oberleutnant zur See	Lieutenant (junior grade)	OF-1a
Marineassistenzarzt	Ensign (Dr.)	Leutnant zur See	Ensign	OF-1b

== Austria-Hungary ==
In the Austria-Hungarian Common Army (de: Gemeinsame Armee or k.u.k. Armee) there was the rank Oberstabsarzt 2. Klasse (en: Senior staff surgeon 2nd class) until 1918 equivalent to Oberfeldarzt in Germany. That particular rank was comparable to the Oberstleutnant OF4-rank (en: colonel) as well.

Ranks k.u.k. Army until 1918				Ranks
Medical service	en	Equivalent Heer	en	Ranks
Generalstabsarzt	Staff-Surgeon General	Generalmajor	Major general	OF-6
Oberstabsarzt I. Klasse	Colonel (Dr. 1st class)	Oberst	Colonel	OF-5
Oberstabsarzt II. Klasse	Lieutenant colonel (Dr. 2nd class)	Oberstleutnant	Lieutenant colonel	OF-4
Stabsarzt	Major (Dr.)	Major		OF-3
Regimentsarzt I. Klasse	Captain (Dr. 1st class)	Hauptmann	Captain	OF-2
Regimentsarzt II. Klasse	Captain (Dr. 2nd class)	Hauptmann	Captain	OF-2
Oberarzt	First lieutenant (Dr.)	Oberleutnant	First lieutenant	OF-1
Assistenzarzt	Second lieutenant (Dr.)	Leutnant	Second lieutenant	OF-1

== Switzerland ==
In the Swiss Armed Forces the Oberfeldarzt of the Army is the most senior representative of the medical service of the Heer. However, the Swiss Oberfeldarzt of the Army might be promoted up to Divisionär (en: Divisional general). This equates to the NATO code of OF-7, or a "two-star rank".
