= Department of Defense Medical Examination Review Board =

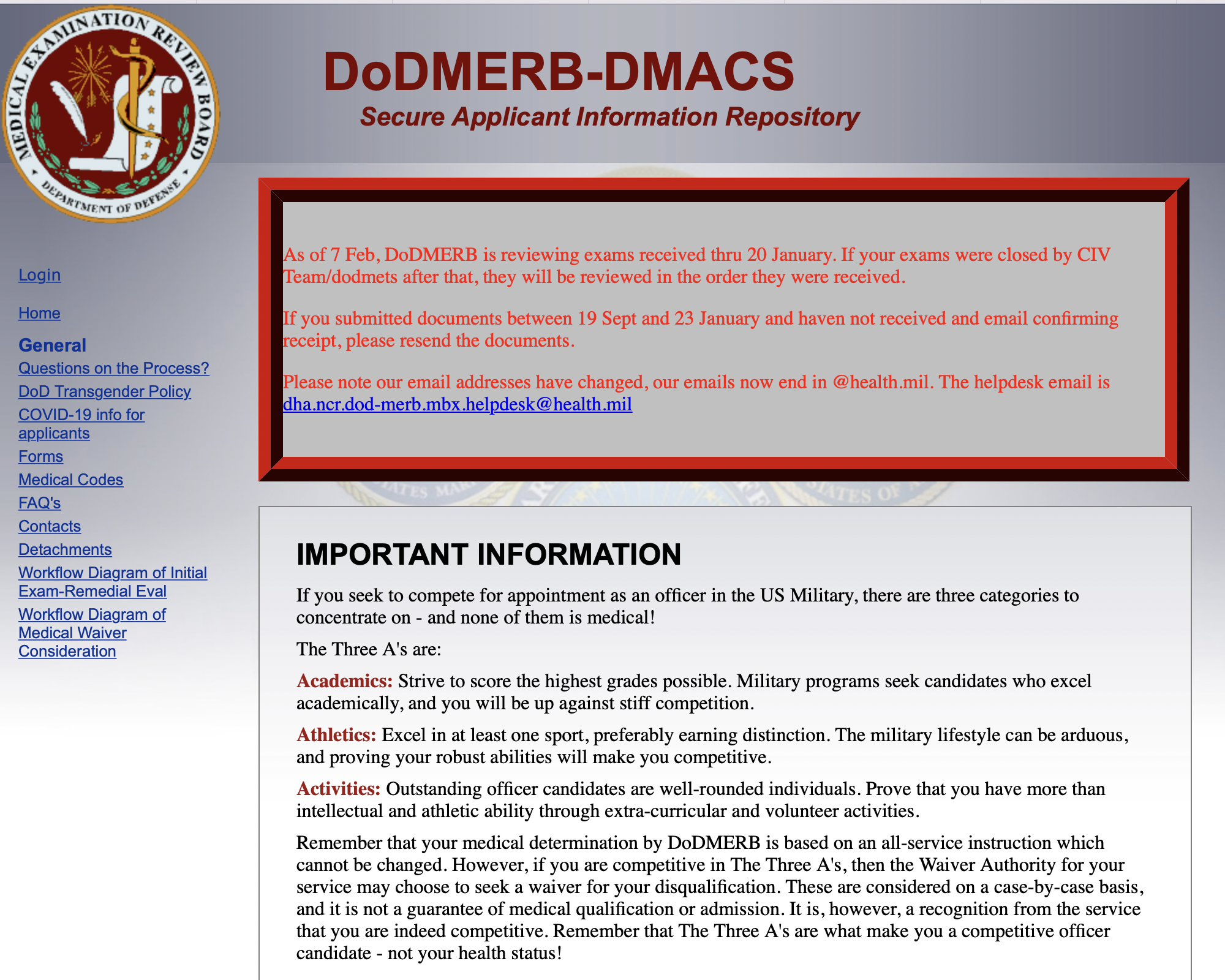
Screenshot of the DoDMERB Website, 8 Feb 2023

The Department of Defense Medical Examination Review Board (DoDMERB) is an element of the United States Department of Defense (DoD) which processes the medical components of admission for applicants to the United States Service Academies; Service Reserve Officer Training Corps (ROTC) programs; the Uniformed Services University of the Health Sciences (USUHS); and other officer accession programs as directed by the Department of Defense (DoD).

DoDMERB schedules, examines, evaluates the results of the medical exam and applicant medical history, and determines whether applicants meet or do not meet medical accession standards.

Applicants determined to not meet medical standards may be considered for a medical waiver from the specific program to which they've applied. Waivers are considered on a case-by-case basis under specific conditions, including cases where the applicant is competitive for an offer of appointment, awarded a scholarship, or meets particular performance standards in a campus-based ROTC program. The medical waiver authorities are designated by the Academies, ROTC programs, USUHS, and officer accession program headquarters. There may be different decisions by the different waiver authorities based on the "needs" of that Service/Program. A risk analysis is performed to determine if an applicant can safely and without exacerbating the disease, illness, condition, and/or injury, train, be commissioned, and be worldwide deployable without restriction, after graduation/initial training.)
