= Journal of the Royal Naval Medical Service =

The Journal of the Royal Naval Medical Service (J. Roy. Nav. Med. Serv.) was a medical journal that was established in 1915 published by the Royal Naval Medical Service latterly based in the Institute of Naval Medicine.

The JRNMS was the RN medical branch's institutional memory and the forum by which new discoveries, techniques and approaches were shared to ensure the service continued to develop, improve and excel.

The journal was peer-reviewed and listed in pubmed.

All articles are available as .pdf files.

It ceased publication in 2019, subsumed into the BMJ Military Health, who maintain the archive.
