= United States Army Medical Command, Vietnam =

Former medical command of the U.S. Army, Vietnam

U.S. Army Medical Command, Vietnam
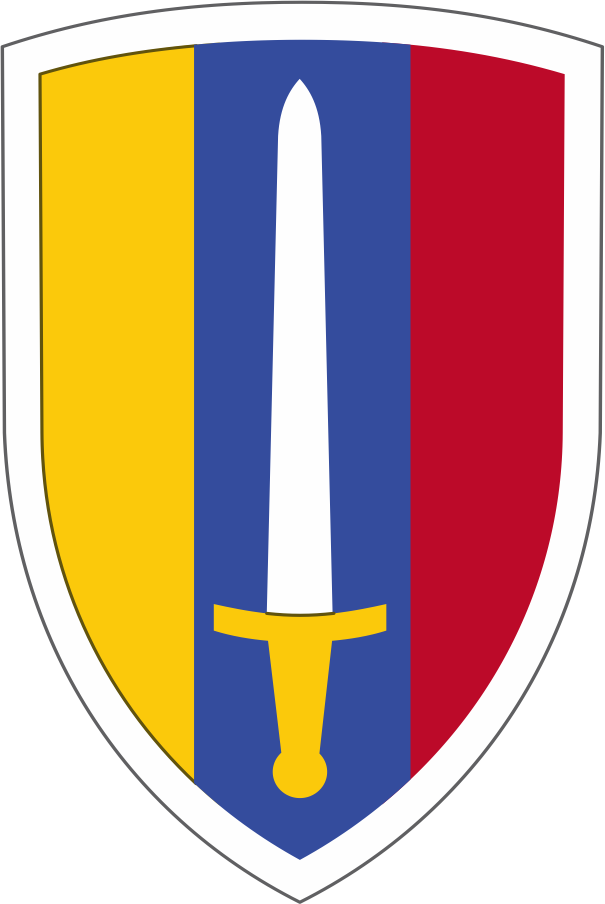
- Shoulder sleeve insignia of United States Army Vietnam worn by personnel assigned to United States Army Medical Command Vietnam
- Active: 1 March 1970 - 30 April 1972
- Country: United States
- Allegiance: Regular Army
- Branch: United States Army
- Type: Medical Command
- Role: Echelon/Role 3 Health Service Support to the U.S. Army, Vietnam
- Garrison/HQ: Long Binh Post, South Vietnam
- Colors: Maroon and White
- Engagements: Vietnam War
- Decorations: Meritorious Unit Commendation (Army), Streamer Embroidered VIETNAM 1970—1971; Republic of Vietnam Civil Action Honor Medal, First Class, Streamer embroidered VIETNAM 1970

The United States Army Medical Command, Vietnam (USAMEDCOMV) provided Echelon/Role 3 Health Service Support to units of the United States Army, Vietnam (USAV). It was a Table of Distribution and Allowances organization created by consolidating the staffs of the 44th Medical Brigade and the USAV Surgeon's Office. This action was taken as part of the overall drawdown of forces in Vietnam in an effort to reduce headquarters staffs and increase efficiencies. As the medical footprint further reduced in 1972, it was replaced by the United States Army Health Services Group, Vietnam on 30 April 1972.

== Lineage ==
- Organized in the Regular Army as Headquarters and Headquarters Company, United States Army Medical Command, Vietnam (Provisional) on 1 March 1970 in South Vietnam
- Constituted 14 December 1970 in the Regular Army as Headquarters and Headquarters Company, United States Army Medical Command, Vietnam and activated in South Vietnam
- Inactivated 30 April 1972 in South Vietnam

== Honors ==
=== Campaign participation credit ===
- Vietnam Winter–Spring 1970
- Sanctuary Counteroffensive
- Vietnam Counteroffensive Phase VII
- Consolidation I
- Consolidation II
- Vietnam Cease-fire

=== Decorations ===
- Meritorious Unit Commendation (Army), Streamer Embroidered VIETNAM 1970—1971
- Republic of Vietnam Civil Action Honor Medal, First Class, Streamer embroidered VIETNAM 1970

== History ==
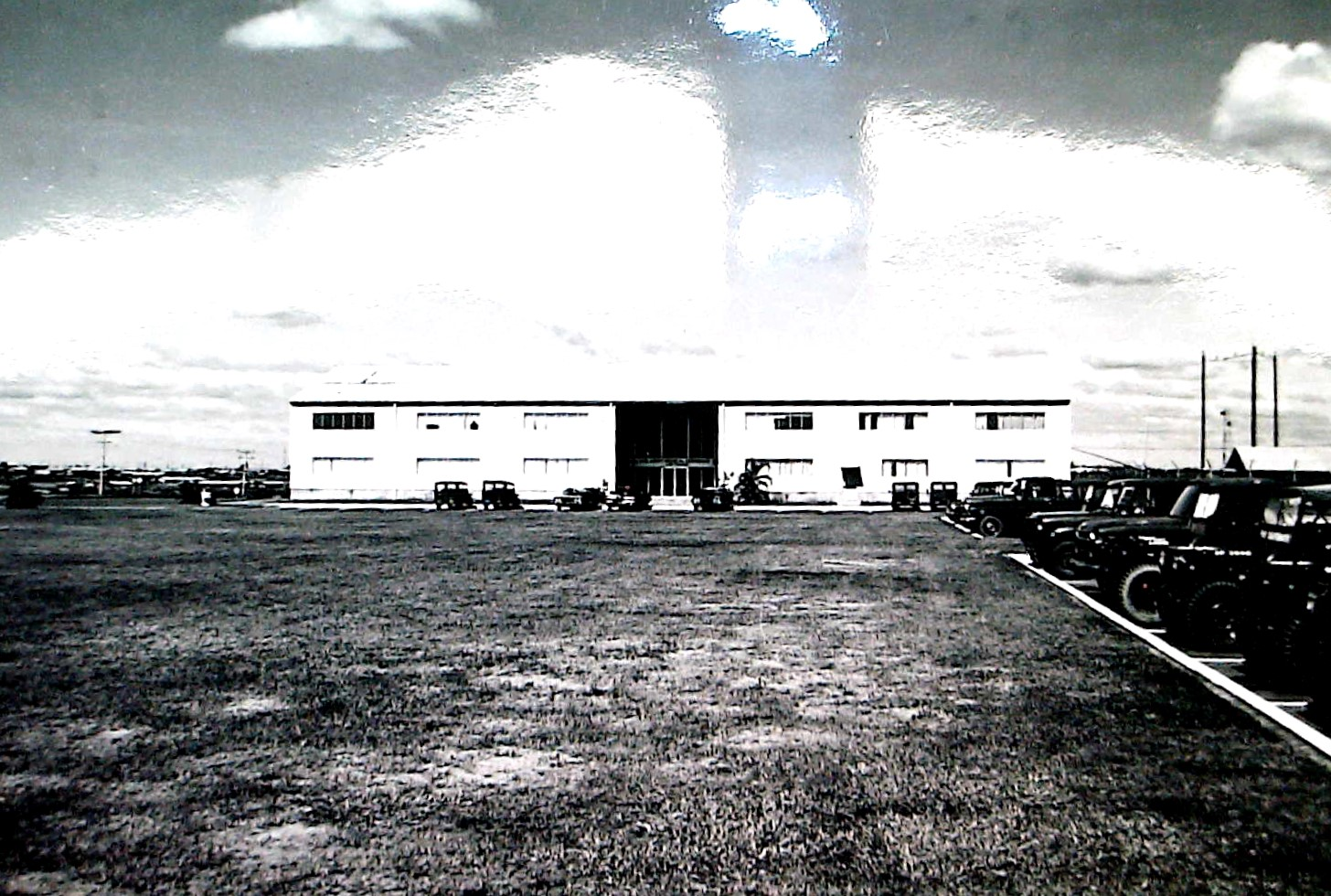
Headquarters Building, United States Army Medical Command, Vietnam, Long Binh Post, 1971

On 1 March 1970, the United States Army Medical Command, Vietnam was organized as a result of consolidating the 44th Medical Brigade and the USARV Surgeon's Office. The Medical Command organization eliminated duplication of effort, reduced manpower requirements by 17% end provided a headquarters that would be more responsive to drawdown requirements.

The 43d Medical Group, with headquarters at Nah Trang, was inactivated on 7 February 1970. Per previously developed plans, the reduction of the 44th Medical Brigade from three medical groups to two was the trigger event for the stand-up of the USAMEDCOMV. The 43d Medical Group was responsible for Army level medical support in the area or operations of Military Region II (formerly II Corps Tactical Zone). With the inactivation of the 43d Medical Group the responsibility for the medical units within the geographic area of MR II was divided roughly in half. The 67th Medical Group assumed the responsibility for the northern half and the 68th Medical Group assumed the responsibility for the southern half.

The concept of a medical battalion composed entirely of helicopter and ground ambulance units was also developed. This battalion would have sole responsibility for combat evacuation, both air and air and ground within the 67th Medical Group area of operation. To implement this concept, the 61st Medical Battalion was organized at Qui Nhon during January 1970 and assigned a mix of an air ambulance company, air ambulance detachments, ground ambulance companies and ground ambulance detachments. After a three-month period of testing and observation of the 61st Medical Battalion, the 58th Medical Battalion was organized at Long Binh along similar lines to support the 68th Medical Group.

The concept provided a better utilization of evacuation assets, improved response, improved maintenance and increased command and control. Direct command, control and supervision was provided by a senior experienced Medical Service Corps aviator with extensive experience in medical evacuation, both ground and air.

Calendar year 1970 could be divided into three distinct periods coinciding with the Keystone Robin redeployment schedules. During the first period, Keystone Bluejay, in February through April, the following units were redeployed or inactivated:

UNIT DESIGNATION	STRENGTH	DATE REDEPLOYED/INACTIVATED
1st Medical Company (Ambulance)	72	4 February 1970
1st Medical Detachment (Mobile Laboratory)	12	6 February 1970
359th Veterinary Detachment (IE)	8	6 February 1970
HHD, 43d Medical Group	41	7 February 1970
760th Veterinary Detachment (JB)	19	9 February 1970
463d Medical Detachment (KB)	3	14 February 1970
67th Medical Detachment (KE)	7	16 February 1970
219th Medical Detachment (KJ)	19	16 February 1970
551st Medical Detachment (KH)	3	16 February 1970
24th Medical Detachment (Mobile Laboratory)	12	18 February 1970
241st Medical Detachment (MB)	21	18 February 1970
764th Medical Detachment (IE)	8	18 February 1970
257th Medical Detachment (KJ)	36	20 February 1970
945th Medical Detachment (KA)	7	20 February 1970
210th Medical Detachment (MC)	31	28 February 1970
2d Surgical Hospital	120	10 March 1970
HHD, 44th Medical Brigade	9*	15 April 1970
	TOTAL - 428	*—Strength reduction only

The following units were contained in a force structure change with spaces reduced and redistributed within the command:

UNIT DESIGNATION	STRENGTH	DATE INACTIVATED
658th Medical Detachment (AC)	8	25 June 1970
188th Medical Detachment (PA)	6	25 June 1970
542d Medical Company (Clearing)	107	25 June 1970
563d Medical Company (Clearing)	107	25 June 1970
667th Medical Detachment (AC)	8	25 June 1970
HHD, 55th Medical Group	41	25 June 1970
7th Surgical Hospital	120	10 July 1970
507th Medical Detachment (FC)	33	10 July 1970
545th Medical Detachment (FC)	33	10 July 1970
666th Medical Detachment (CG)	33	10 July 1970
	TOTAL - 470	

- Although this chart reflects the effective dates, some of these reductions had actually been made months before their effective dates.

During the second redeployment period of calendar year 1970, Keystone Robin (ALPHA), covering June 1970 through 15 October 1970, the following units were redeployed or inactivated:

UNIT DESIGNATION	STRENGTH	DATE REDEPLOYED/INACTIVATED
51st Medical Company (Ambulance)	84	31 July 1970
561st Medical Company (Ambulance)	84	31 July 1970
75th Veterinary Detachment (JA)	6	31 July 1970
504th Veterinary Detachment (JA)	6	15 August 1970
71st Evacuation Hospital	135*	14 October 1970
	TOTAL - 315	*—Strength reduction only

The following units were contained in a force structure change with spaces reduced and redistributed within the command:

UNIT DESIGNATION	STRENGTH	DATE INACTIVATED
17th Field Hospital	95	1 August 1970
551st Transportation Detachment	56	1 August 1970
	TOTAL - 151	

- The 551st Transportation Detachment provided Direct Support Aircraft Maintenance to the 45th Medical Company (Air Ambulance)

During the third period of calendar year 1970, Keystone Robin (BRAVO), covering 15 October through 31 December 1970, the following units were redeployed or inactivated:

UNIT DESIGNATION	STRENGTH	DATE REDEPLOYED/INACTIVATED
45th Surgical Hospital	123	15 August 1970
254th Medical Detachment (RA)	48	15 November 1970
HHD, 44th Medical Brigade	0	3 December 1970
12th Evacuation Hospital	305	14 December 1970
71st Evacuation Hospital	170	14 December 1970
8th Field Hospital	39*	31 December 1970
	TOTAL - 685	*—Strength reduction only

- On 3 December 1970, the 44th Medical Brigade's colors were returned to Fort Meade Maryland, where the 18th Medical Brigade was reflagged as the 44th.

In addition to the units effected by Key stone activities, other units were relocated in country in order to balance the alignment of medical support in Vietnam:

UNIT DESIGNATION	FROM	TO	DATE OF MOVE
57th Medical Detachment (RA)	Lai Khe	Binh Tuy	19 Feb 1970
39th Medical Detachment (KJ)	Pleiku	An Khe	1 April 1970
98th Medical Detachment (KO)	Nha Trang	Da Nang	1 May 1970
3d Medical Detachment (LB)	Pleiku	Da Nang	1 May 1970
483d Medical Detachment (RE)	Qui Nhon	Chu Lai	20 May 1970
500th Medical Detachment (RA)	Quang Tri	Phu Bai	20 May 1970
237th Medical Detachment (RA)	Quang Tri	Phu Bai	20 May 1970
507th Medical Detachment (FC)	Chu Lai	Da Nang	15 June 1970
673d Medical Detachment (OA)*	Long Binh	Da Nang	1 August 1970
8th Field Hospital	Nha Trang	An Khe	1 August 1970
283d Medical Detachment (RA)	Pleiku	Tuy Hoa	15 October 1970
39th Medical Detachment (KJ)***	An Khe	Qui Nhon	1 December 1970
8th Field Hospital	An Khe	Tuy Hoa	3 December 1970
53d Medical Detachment (KA)**	Long Binh	Pleiku	14 December 1970

-* Less personnel and equipment
-** Less equipment
-*** Zero strength personnel and equipment

== USAMEDCOMV Mission ==
To advise the Deputy Commanding General, USARV, on all matters pertaining to the health of the command; exercise technical supervision over all medical activities; control the assignment and utilization of AMEDD officer personnel; and plan for and ensure that adequate medical service is available within USARV.

Command all Army Medical Department units assigned or attached and provide medical, dental and veterinary service support to United States Army personnel, Free World Military Assistance Forces personnel and other categories of personnel as directed. To provide hospitalization, medical and surgical care to Vietnamese civilians injured as a result or hostile action.

== USAMEDCOMV Functions ==
The USAMEDCOMV was tasked with an extensive list of functions, due to the combination of the staff and command and control missions within the headquarters. Those functions included:

1. Providing advice to the Deputy Commanding General, USARV, on all matters pertaining to the health of the command and exercising staff responsibility for the health services of the command.
2. Developing medical policy consistent with the policy of the command, implementing procedures to insure adherence to established policies and issuing policy guidance.
3. Developing, refining, adjusting, coordinating and implementing medical plans consistent with USARV plans, and developing the medical portion of USARV plans.
4. Establishing procedures for collection, clearing and evacuation of casualties.
5. Controlling and directing all medical service operations to include hospitalization, evacuation, dental, veterinary, medical supply and maintenance, preventive medicine and laboratory support activities of the command.
6. Supervising the medical equipment status reporting system.
7. Providing veterinary food inspection and animal veterinary service to United States Army Forces and such other United States Forces as directed by higher headquarters.
8. Coordinating medical research and providing medical laboratory support to United States Army Forces and other United States Forces, as directed.
9. Providing medical regulating to patients intra-Army, or as directed by higher headquarters.
10. Directing utilization and assignment of AMEDD officer personnel and monitoring assignment and utilization of enlisted personnel of the command.
11. Maintaining medical liaison with and coordinating medical, professional and technical matters with the surgeons of higher headquarters.
12. Providing personnel and administrative support to units assigned or attached.
13. Providing medical support to United States Army units not having an assigned or organic medical support capability.
14. Providing dental service to United States Forces on an area basis as required.
15. Providing humanitarian type dental treatment for United States nationals, Republic of Vietnam Armed Forces and Free World Military Assistance Forces and such other activities and organizations as directed by higher headquarters.
16. Pursuing an aggressive preventive dentistry program.
17. On order, be prepared to augment division and separate brigade medical service.
18. Providing a medical system of hospitalization and evacuation to support United States and Free World Military Assistance Forces and such other activities and organizations as directed by higher headquarters.
19. Supervising professional medical service of subordinate units.
20. Exercising custody of medical records and rendering reports on patients treated as required; collecting, analyzing, consolidating and forwarding medical reports and statistics.
21. Providing technical inspection and maintenance support of medical equipment and supplies.
22. Providing inventory control, receipt, storage and issue of all medical stocks for United States Army Forces, other US Military Forces and agencies and for designated Free World Military Assistance Forces, as directed by higher headquarters.
23. Providing medical equipment maintenance and repair facilities.
24. Supervising the medical equipment status reporting system.
25. Providing guidance on the establishment of security of personnel, equipment, facilities and billets of elements of assigned and attached units.
26. Providing medical support to Free World Military Assistance Forces, prisoners of war and to civilian war casualties, as directed by higher headquarters.
27. Providing medical support to civilian contract agencies in accordance with contractual agreements.
28. Inspecting personnel, material and training of subordinate units to evaluate unit readiness.
29. Conducting civic action programs in accordance with established policies.
30. Providing chaplain activities within the command, supervising and providing staff direction to chaplains and chaplain activities of all elements of the commend and providing morale and welfare support.
31. Conducting public information and command information programs for all assigned and attached medical units in accordance with established policies of higher headquarters.
32. Recommending and supervising the execution of measures for prevention and control of disease within the command and providing primary preventive medicine services for those organizations lacking organic medical support.
33. Providing preventive medicine services beyond the capability of surgeons of subordinate USARV units or commands.
34. Providing preventive medicine services to other United States Forces, Free World Military Assistance Forces and Government of Vietnam Armed Forces, as directed by higher headquarters.
35. Assisting in controlling or preventing epidemic disease in local civil populations as necessary to protect the health of USARV personnel as directed by higher headquarters.
36. Providing optometric support to United States Army personnel, other US Forces and Free World Military Assistance Forces on an area basis as required.

== Shoulder Sleeve Insignia ==
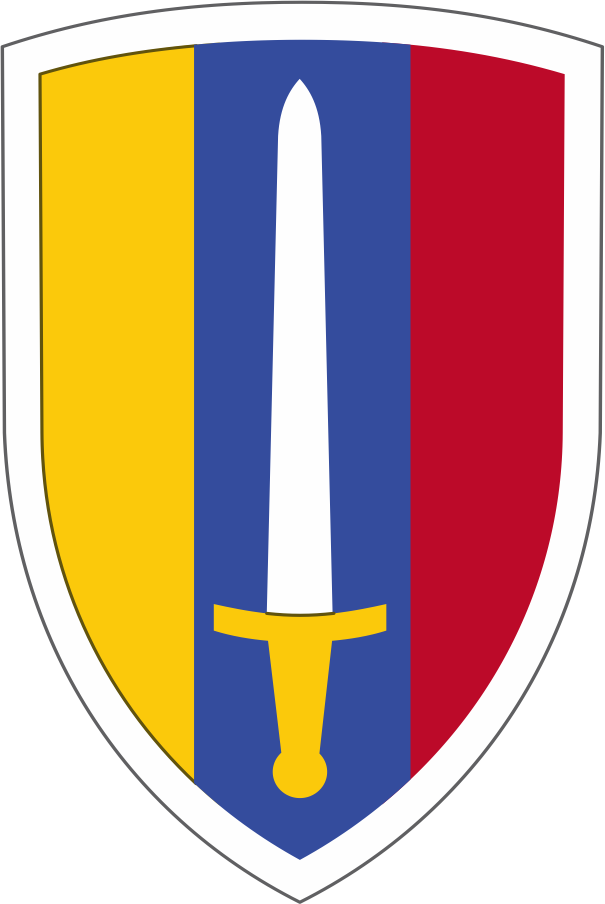
Shoulder sleeve insignia of United States Army Vietnam worn by soldiers assigned to personnel assigned to United States Army Medical Command, Vietnam

Although several publications show the United States Army Health Services Command Shoulder Sleeve Insignia on "patch" charts as the insignia worn by the U.S. Army Medical Command, Vietnam, ample photographic and documentary evidence, including The Institute of Heraldry's declination to authorize the USAMEDCOMV a shoulder sleeve insignia of their own, shows that members of the command actually wore the shoulder sleeve insignia of the United States Army, Vietnam.

== Distinctive unit insignia ==
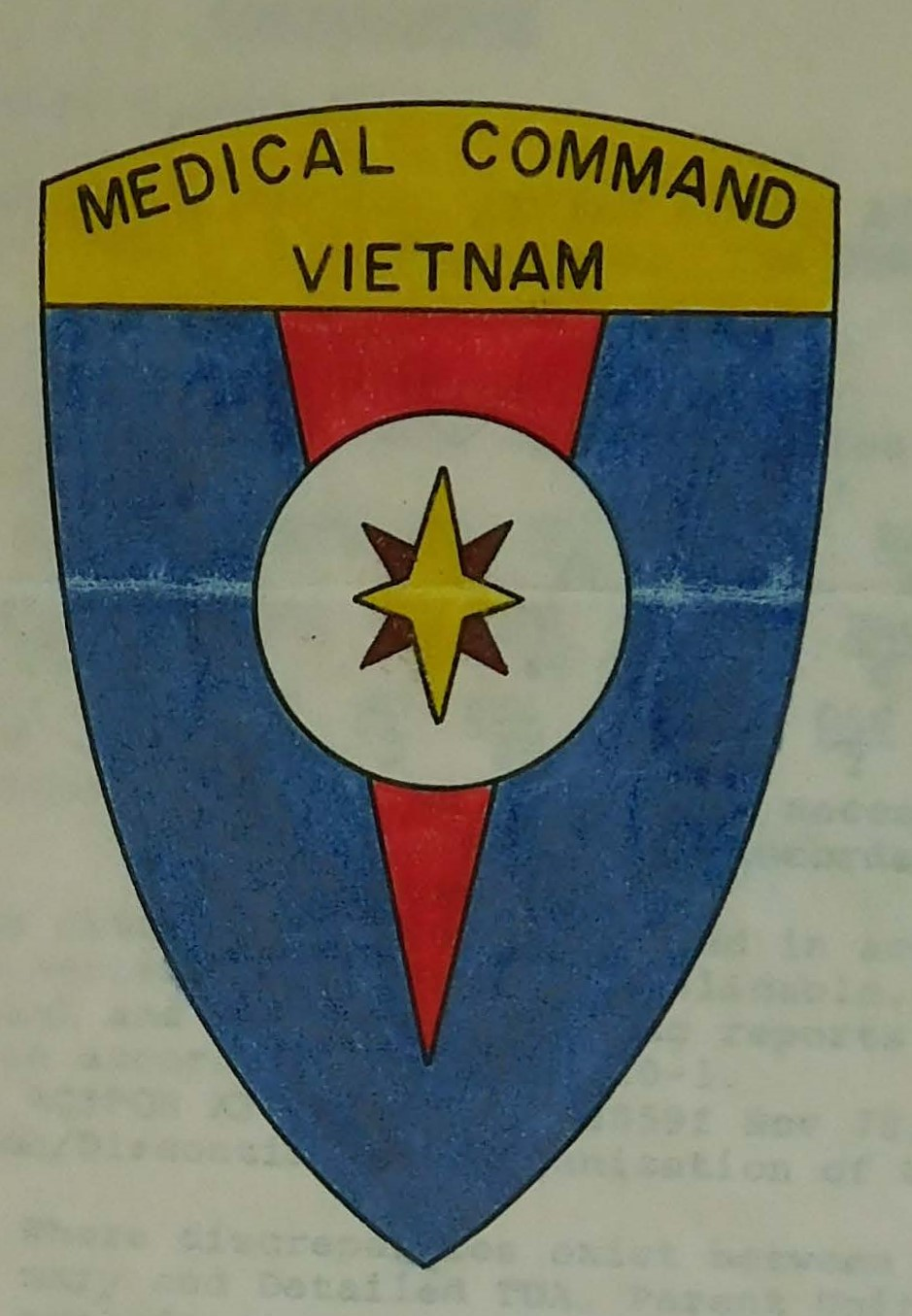
Proposed shoulder sleeve insignia of United States Army Medical Command, Vietnam

Unauthorized "Beercan" pocket badge of the United States Army Medical Command, Vietnam

No Distinctive unit insignia was authorized for the United States Army Medical Command, Vietnam by the United States Army Institute of Heraldry.

On 16 June 1971, the USAMEDCOMV requested authorization for a shoulder sleeve insignia. Although disapproved by The Institute of Heraldry on 6 October 1971, there is evidence that a "Beer Can" version of the patch was worn on the uniform pocket of some individuals.

=== Description ===
The insignia is in the shape of a shield with a "V" design in the center to represent service in Vietnam. The two four pointed stars superimposed over the "V" represents the command's derivation from the 44th Medical Brigade whose mission they assumed. The colors Red, Yellow, and Blue are symbolic of the colors of HQ, USARV.

== Commanders ==
All commanders of the United States Army Medical Command, Vietnam were Medical Corps officers.

Image	Name	Rank	Begin date	End date	Notes
	David E. Thomas	Brigadier General	1 March 1970	2 December 1970	Thomas made two combat jumps as a battalion surgeon with the 82d Airborne Division in World War II. Although he commanded the 44th Medical Brigade until it redeployed on 2 December 1970, the headquarters had been taken to zero strength and he had assumed command of the US Army Medical Command, Vietnam (Provisional) on 1 March 1970.
	Phillip J. Noel, Jr.	Colonel	3 December 1970	20 June 1971	
	Richard H. Ross	Colonel	21 June 1971	30 April 1972	Ross would continue to command the United States Army Health Services Group, successor to the USAMEDCOMV, until 18 June 1972. Note also that Ross wears a Medical Command, Vietnam "Beercan" Pocket Patch in his command photo.
