= Basic Parachute Course =

British Armed Forces course

The Basic Parachute Course for members of the British Armed Forces is conducted by the Parachute Training Squadron of the Airborne Delivery Wing, based at RAF Brize Norton.

== Overview ==
The Basic Parachute Course is three weeks long for regular troops. During that time, trainees are instructed in exit, flight and landing techniques. They are required to complete four descents, one at night, to qualify for their 'wings'. Exit training is carried out from full-size mock ups of C-130 Hercules and Skyvan fuselages. In groups of eight, each with its own RAF Parachute Jumping Instructor (PJI), trainees are taught the techniques of jumping individually and in 'sticks', both with and without equipment. Trainees are taught flight drills while suspended from the hangar roof in parachute harnesses on cables. They learn to control their parachutes while descending, and to carry out emergency measures such as untwisting their rigging lines, taking the necessary action on colliding with another parachutist, and landing in water. Parachute Landing Falls, or PLFs, for landing safely are taught using rubber mats. As trainees become more proficient, the height from which they jump is increased by the use of steps and eventually ramps which they run and jump off. Forward, side and backwards landings are practiced on a six-sided trapeze from which the trainees hang by their hands while being swung in the air. On the command of the PJI, trainees let go and perform the appropriate roll on landing.

The next stage involves the fan trainer. Wearing a harness connected to a cable wound round a drum fitted with fan blades, trainees jump from a platform located near the roof of the hangar; as they fall, their rate of descent is controlled to simulate that of a parachute.

Subsequently, trainees carry out their first descent from the side door of a A400M Atlas or rear of a Skyvan carrying their Parachute Equipment Load, a weighted backpack that is carried fixed to the front of the harness. Once exited, and under a fully inflated canopy, this is lowered on a 15ft rope below the parachutist. Their second descent adds a weapon and Parachutist Life Preserver, to be inflated if landing in water, and the third adds body armour. This is followed by a fourth descent with all equipment at night.

== Parachute Badge ==
On successful completion of their four descents, trainees are presented with their 'wings' by the Officer Commanding Airborne Delivery Wing, and return to their units as qualified parachutists.

Reservists conduct the same training as their Regular counterparts on the same three week course in order to be awarded their Parachutist wings.

== History ==
In the past, ground training concluded with the exit trainer, designed to simulate the effect of slipstream as the parachutist exits the aircraft. The trainer consisted of a wooden cabin, mounted on a structure of girders, equipped with doors representing those on the port and starboard side of the Hercules. On either side cables ran from above the trainer to a point near the ground some 55 yards away. Wearing harnesses suspended from them, trainees jumped from the trainer and traveled the length of the cables in a gradual descent towards the ground, where their progress is arrested by an instructor.

Until the late 1990s, the first parachute descent was from a balloon at the dropping zone at Weston-on-the-Green; this has since been phased out. It was carried out from a height of 800ft (244m) in what is known as "clean fatigue" - without equipment.

Eight descents used to be carried out in total instead of four today. Trainees performed their first descent from a C-130 Hercules in single 'sticks' of six without equipment from one door of the aircraft. Their second descent was again in 'clean fatigue', in single 'sticks' of eight or ten. Trainees then make their third descent, jumping in simultaneous 'sticks' of six from both sides of a Hercules. This was followed by a night descent without equipment. Thereafter, descents were made with equipment, initially in a single 'stick' of six, subsequently in simultaneous 'sticks' of eight or ten and finally in the maximum size of 'stick' possible, depending upon the number of personnel on the course.

The historical course for members of Army Reserve units and Royal Marines Reserve lasted only two weeks, and trainees were required to complete only seven descents without one at night. Before taking the course, however, they had to undergo a considerable amount of synthetic training to enable them to be of a sufficient standard to carry out their balloon descent and their first aircraft descent by the end of the first week at Brize Norton. The rest of their descents are carried out during the second week of the course.

In 2020, Captain Rosie Wild, the first female to pass the All Arms Pre-Parachute Selection Course (P Company), passed the BPC to wear the Wings badge.

== See also ==
- P company
