= Medical Assistant (Royal Navy) =

Royal Navy medical rating in the UK

- Rating insignia
- Issued by: Royal Navy
- Type: Rating
- Abbreviation: MA
- Specialty: Medical Branch

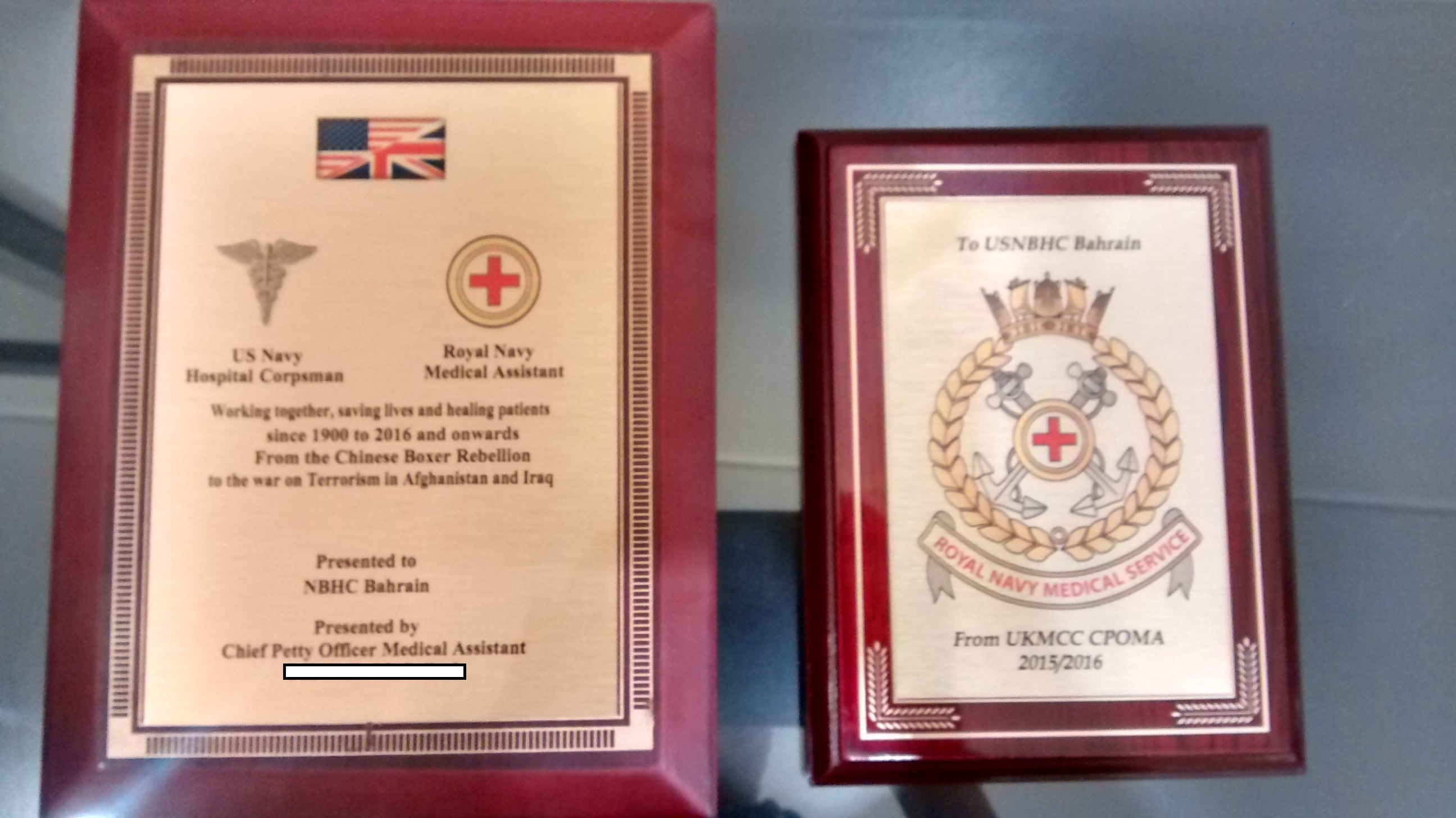
USN Hospital Corpsman and Royal Navy Medical Assistant shared history.

The Medical Assistant is a Royal Navy medical rating in the United Kingdom. Medical Assistants serve on all types of ships in the surface fleet, submarine fleet, Royal Marines, Fleet Air Arm or ashore in a sick bay, hospitals, or other establishment. The equivalent rate in the United States Navy (USN) is hospital corpsman.

== Overview ==
The Medical Assistant provides a broad spectrum of skills in primary care, occupational health, secondary care, pre-hospital trauma life support, medical administration, teaching first aid and disease prevention, providing health briefs, and basic environmental health. These are performed in a variety of roles at sea in a ship or submarine, with Royal Marines Commandos, Fleet Air Arm, shore establishments, Ministry of Defence Hospital Units, UKSF, and other Tri-Service departments. Predominantly they provide day-to-day healthcare for their crew mates as a vital part of the ship's company. On larger ships, they are part of a medical team, while on smaller ships they may be the only medic on board.

== History ==
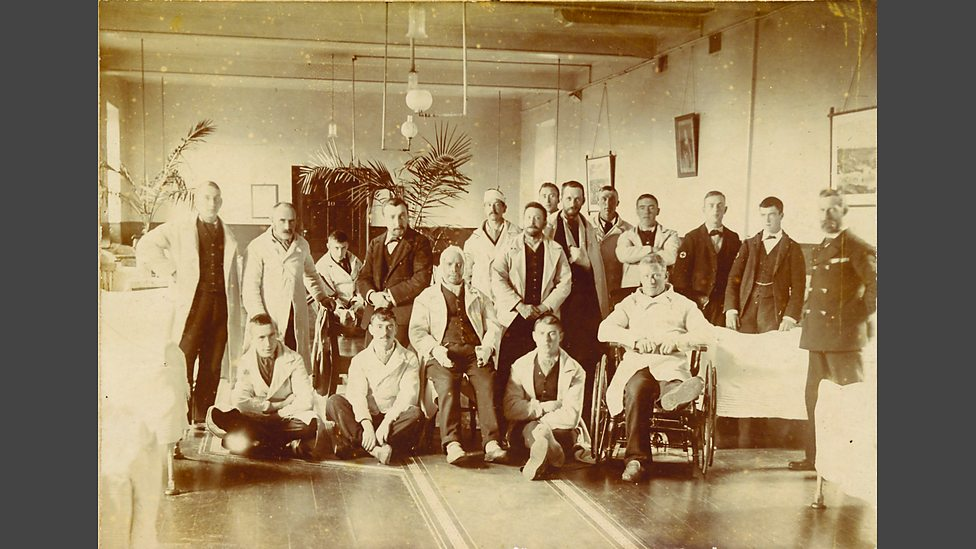
Members of the Royal Navy Sick Berth Branch (with patients).

The Medical Assistant was previously known as Sick Berth Attendant and Sick Berth Steward (19th–20th century) and earlier as loblolly boy (16th–19th century). Medical Assistants are colloquially known as "scablifters" or "doc" in Royal Naval Jackspeak.

The Sick Berth Branch of the Royal Navy originated on 4 May 1833 when an Admiralty order was issued to Commanding Officers to organise a "Sick Berth Attendant" in ships of the 5th rate and upwards a man of good character is to be selected from the complement and rated as Sick Berth attendant, whose duty it will be to attend exclusively on the sick, without being called away by the ordinary duties of the ship, and who is to be paid as an able seaman.

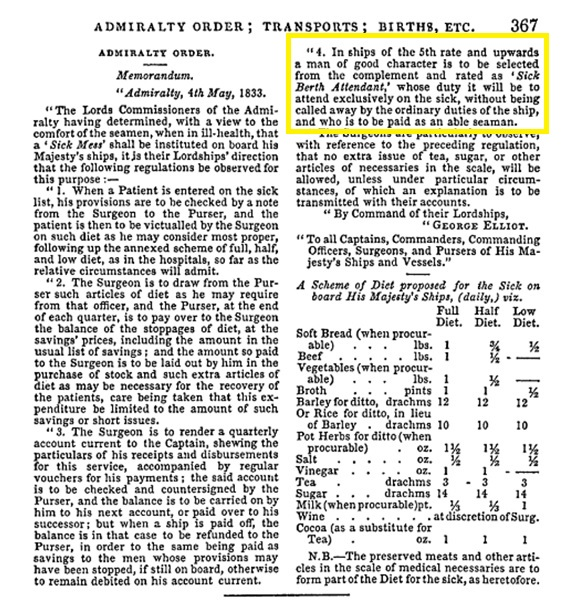
Admiralty order 1833 4 May stating the order to form sick berths, rationing for seamen in ill health and for the formation of the Sick Berth Attendant.

They received no formal medical training and it was not until June 1883 that a Committee, known as the Hoskins Committee, after its chairman, Rear Admiral A. H. Hoskins was formed to enquire into the organization and training of the Sick Berth and Nursing Staff of the Royal Navy Hospitals. The committee, after visiting Naval and Military Hospitals as well as the larger London Hospitals reported their findings to the Admiralty in the autumn of 1884. The Admiralty gave their verdict in an Order in Council dated 17 October 1884. This Order authorised the establishment of a trained Sick Berth Rating Staff with the following Rates:

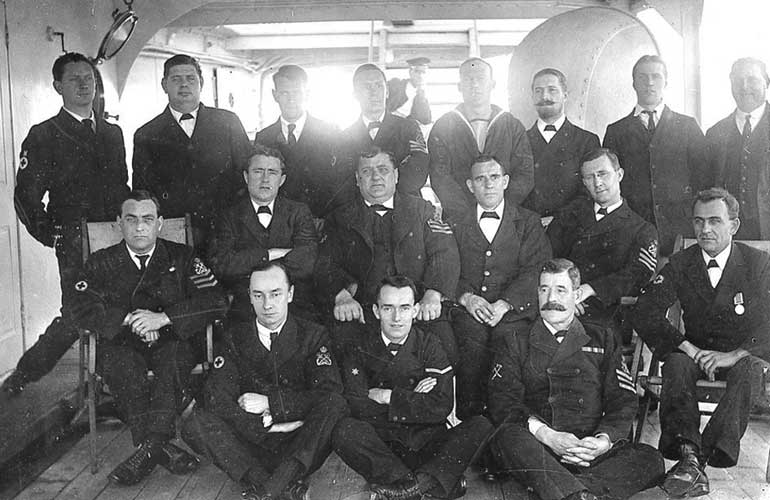
Sick Berth staff onboard World War I hospital ship

- 1st and 2nd Class Boys
- Sick Berth Attendant
- Sick Berth Steward 2nd Class
- Sick Berth Steward 1st Class
- Chief Sick Berth Steward

The Order also supported the formation of trained female nursing staff in naval hospitals, which in 1902 was to become the Queen Alexandra's Royal Naval Nursing Service.

It was thought that boys from the Greenwich Hospital School, later the Royal Hospital School, would fill the vacancies. This proved not to be the case, so entry was opened to the Royal Marines and civilians.

In 1900, three new posts were created, known as Head Wardmasters, one for each of the three main hospitals.

In 1891 Sick Berth personnel received a new style of uniform. Instead of the blue serge jumper, blue cloth collar and bell bottom trousers, known as 'Square Rig, they received a single or double breasted jacket and trousers with black buttons, red badges and a peaked cap. This was known as 'fore and aft' rig, and issued to 'all ratings not dressed as seamen. This uniform was also issued to tradesmen known as "Artificers", who were collectively known as "Tiffies". So it was natural that sick berth attendants were also known as "Sick Berth Tiffies".

In 1903 the Saint John Ambulance Brigade provided staff to create the Royal Navy Auxiliary Sick Berth Reserve (R.N.A.S.B.R.). Initially suggested in 1899, the Lord Commissioners of the Admiralty expressed their desire for the Brigade to provide and auxiliary sick berth reserve for ships at war, hospital ships and naval hospitals at home and abroad. Regulations for this reserve were issued to every Corps division. The Chief Commissioner requested that the officer in charge of every ambulance unit of the Brigade will be good enough to assemble members without delay. The reserve was formed for the purpose of supplementing Sick Berth staff of the Royal Navy in time of national emergency and maritime war only and would be subject to the Naval Discipline act when activated. Volunteers were issued the same uniforms as their regular SBA counterparts, but wore an arm badge indicating that they belonged to the Auxiliary Sick Berth Reserve. There were two grades of ratings, junior and senior Auxiliary Royal Navy Sick Berth Attendants. However they would be able to become Sick Berth Stewards and even reserve Ward masters, if qualified and on a vacancy arising. During peace time they would be required to attend one annual inspection. Special First Aid courses and nursing instruction were provided to the auxiliaries, normally carried out at the nearest Royal Naval Hospital. The auxiliaries would serve with distinction in the Great War at sea, in hospitals, and with the Royal Naval Divisions on land. In World War 2 they again served with honour in Dunkirk, at sea, on the raid at Loften islands, during the withdrawal of Polish Forces from France 1940, the attack on Dieppe, the battle of Crete, the capture of Sicily, and in the Far Eastern theatre of war.

On 16 December 1914 Royal Marine Medical Units were formed to support the RM Brigade of the RN Divisions that were to fight on land during WW1 as there were not enough SBAs or RNASBR ratings to fulfill this role. They were trained at Crystal Palace. The majority made up the Field Ambulance sections for the RN divisions. The medical unit was borne on the strength of the Royal Marine Depot, Deal. And were allotted the service number: Depot (S) and entered on same register as Engineer and Army Service Corps unit. The excerpt from 'OFFICIAL HISTORY OF THE MEDICAL UNIT OF THE ROYAL NAVAL DIVISION FROM ITS INCEPTION TO THE EVACUATION OF GAILIPOLI.' by Arthur Gaskell: "The position then was that the A.D.M.S. knew exactly what personnel he wanted, and Mr. Darvil-Smith knew exactly how to get them. The G.0.U. of the Division referred the matter to the Administrative Headquarters, and here unforeseen difficulties and delays arose as to how these men should be entered. Should they be Sick Berth ratings or Royal Marines? Should they be Royal Marines ashore or Royal Marines afloat? Should they be under the Army Act or under the Naval Discipline Act? what rate of pay should they receive'? What allowances were they entitled to, more especially should they have separation allowance? This last point was especially insisted upon by Mr. Darvil-Smith. At last a round-table discussion among Mr. Darvil-Smith, Lieutenant-Colonel Blumberg, R.M.L.I., Fleet Surgeon Stewart and the A.D.1\f.S. (Fleet Surgeon Gaskell), with the D.A.D.M.S. (Captain Casement, R.A.M.C.), settled all these knotty points." They would see action in France on the Western front and Gallipoli. At the end of the great war the Royal Marine Medical Units were disbanded along with a reduction of the Sick Berth Branch.

In 1920, the term Steward was dropped in favour of Petty Officer. Another major change took place in 1965 which affected the Royal Navy as a whole when the "Fore and Aft" rig was abolished in favour of the "Square Rig". Also in 1965 the term Medical Assistant replaced Sick Berth, and so it remains to this day.

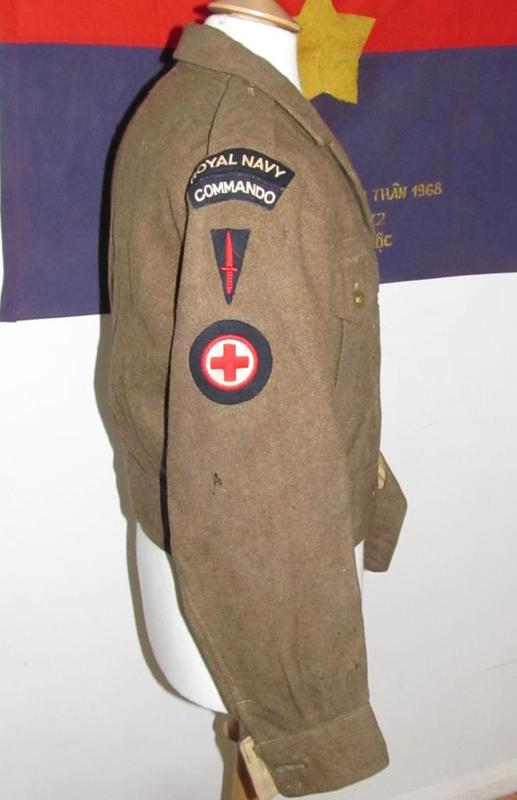
Royal Navy Commando MA uniform World War II

The Royal Navy Medical Assistant, throughout their history, whether as a Loblollyboy, or Sick Berth Rating, has seen action during war and in peace. From assisting the ships surgeons in amputating limbs to nursing the injured sailors and Marines from wars and battles throughout Britain's history, from the 16th century onwards. Most notably they served with distinction during the Napoleonic Wars at sea, the Crimean War, the Boer and other African wars, the Chinese Boxer Rebellion, and in World War I at sea and on the land. Both Sick Berth Staff of the Navy and the Medical Attendants of the Royal Marines served with distinction at the Battle of Jutland, Flanders, Gallipoli, the Western Front, Battle of Heligoland Bight, Zeebrugge Raid, the Mediterranean Expeditionary Force, Siege of Antwerp, the Battle of Dogger Bank, and the British Campaign in the Baltic (Russia) to name a few.

During World War II the Sick Berth Branch once again served with distinction from the Atlantic to the Pacific, in Commando raids at St Nazaire and the D-Day landings at Normandy, the far East, and with the British Pacific Fleet at Okinawa.

Post-war they served with further recognition and distinction in Op Musketeer (Suez Crisis), Korea, Aden, Malaya, Malaysia/Borneo Operation Claret, Op Banner N. Ireland, Op Corporate Falkland Islands, Gulf War 1, Bosnia, Kosovo, Op Herrick Afghanistan, Op Telic Iraq, various humanitarian and other peacetime Operations, both at sea and with the Royal Marine Commandos. A total of 992 have died in service, Their name liveth for evermore.

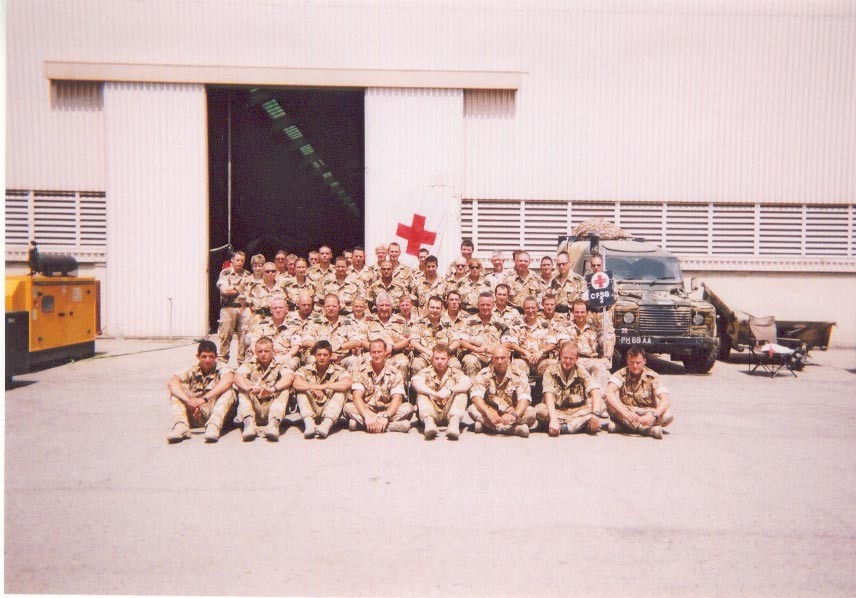
Commando Forward Surgical Group 2 Az Zubayr Port Iraq 2003

== Honours and awards ==
So far recorded the Sick Berth/Medical Assistant branch rating has earned:

- Albert Medal x 4
- Conspicuous Gallantry Medal x 4
- George Medal x 3
- Distinguished Service Medal x 83
- Distinguished Conduct Medal x 2
- Military Cross x 3
- Military Medal (8 with Bar) x 133
- Queen's Gallantry Medal x 1
- British Empire Medal x 179
- Member of the Royal Victorian Order x 1
- Royal Victorian Medal x 6
- Order of St John serving officer x 1
- Order of St John Serving Brother x 31
- Venerable Order of Saint John (Serving Sister) x 1
- Royal Humane Society Medal x 2
- Member of the Order of the British Empire Medal x 18
- Meritorious Service Medal x 103
- Queen's Commendation for Brave Conduct x 3
- Mention in Despatches x 330
- Royal Red Cross 2nd Class x 8
- Queens Commendation for Valuable Service x 4
- (Foreign awards listed are those of which the reigning monarch of the time provided permission to wear, and therefore noted in the London Gazette. Many foreign decorations are also listed to the medical branch which have not been noted in the London Gazette) but are in Admiralty Notices (ADMs).
- Cross of St George 4th Class (Russia) x 2
- Russian Silver breast medal with St Stanislas Ribbon 3rd Class x 6
- Samaritan Cross (Serbia) x 1
- St.George_Medal_4th_Class x 19
- Croix de Guerre (French) (2 with palm) x 8
- Croix de Guerre (Belgium) x 5
- Croix de Virtute Militara 2nd Class (Romania) x 1
- Krzyz Walecznych (Polish Cross of Valour) x 1
- Romanian Distinguished Conduct Medal 2nd class x 1
- Medal of the Order of Orange-Nassau Gold with crossed swords (Netherlands) x 1
- Gold Medal for Zealous service (Serbia) x 1
- Silver Medal for Zealous service x 1
- Medal for the Retreat from Albania 1915, bronze x 1
- Medal of the Order of Orange-Nassau Silver (Netherlands) x 1
- Medal of the Order of Orange-Nassau Bronze (Netherlands) x 1
- Silver Medal of Military Valor (Italy) x 1
- Bronze Medal of Military Valor (Italy) x 2
- Médaille militaire (French) x 6
- Decoration Militaire (Belgium) x 1
- Medal D'Honneur des Épidémies (Bronze) (French) x 1
- Medal of Military Merit (Greece) x 1
- Cross of Valour (Greece) x 1
- Imperial Order of the Dragon of Annam Chevalier (French Vietnamese) x 1
- NATO Meritorious Service Medal (NATO MSM) x 1

An ongoing project is underway to find all honours and awards that have been recorded in the London Gazette for the Sick Berth/Medical Assistant ratings. Many more are being discovered.

== Training ==
Basic training (10 weeks) is conducted at HMS Raleigh shore establishment in Torpoint, Cornwall. Medical training (39 weeks) is conducted at the Defence Medical Academy at Whittington Barracks in Lichfield.

The first 13 weeks is called Foundation medic and is also completed with the medics from the British Army and RAF. This training includes:

- Anatomy and physiology
- Disorders and their treatments
- Basic pharmacology and dispensing
- Basic environmental health
- Preventative medicine
- Wounds and dressings
- Medical administration
- Geneva Convention
- First-Aid
- Military Acute Care Course, involving Pre-Hospital Trauma, Life Support.

An exam is taken on each week, those unable on the pass on their second attempt of each exam are 'back classed'.

Once complete a clinical placement of 6 weeks is conducted in a Ministry of Defence Hospital Unit (MDHU) on various wards. Trainees then return to DMSTG Whittington barracks to complete 6 weeks of Single Service (SS) training. SS training involves learning all aspects of Royal Navy medical administration, medical care in the CBRN environment and the care of those suffering from CBRN causes. Included in this is a week spent on board the training ship, HMS Bristol to practice casualty extraction, treatment, casualty simulation, organising of First-Aid exercises and the management of First-Aid Parties during peace and action stations.

The final set of clinical placements covers a period of 12 weeks. The first 6 weeks are conducted at a Medical Centre at a shore establishment to put into practice clinical primary care and administrative skills. The next 6 weeks are spent once again at a MDHU, this time culminating in shifts at Emergency Rooms and Medical and Surgical Acute Care wards.

On return from the final phase of clinical placements the trainees return to DMSTG for 2 weeks which involves final exams on everything learned and if successful, graduation. The final phase, called 'Part IV training' is then concluded by a consolidation period of 'on the job' supervised training (12 weeks) on board a ship or shore establishment sick bay.

=== Continuation of training ===
Throughout their career an MA must complete a rolling OPS task book, which was introduced in to the MA branch in 2010. This task book covers all skills required for the MA to maintain their clinical skills in the primary care, secondary care and emergency care environments as well as medical administration and various maritime components. The various sections vary from being required to be completed annually to three yearly. The task book must be kept up to date and is an annual requirement if the rating is to be expected to even meet the basic qualifying criteria for further promotion. This ensures the MA remains current and motivated with their knowledge and skills. The rolling OPS task book is currently required for the MA, Leading Medical Assistant (LMA) and Petty Officer Medical Assistant (POMA) rates.

=== Pre-front line assignment training ===
Prior to joining a ship, submarine or 3 Commando Brigade, MAs must conduct either the Maritime or Commando MA's Pre-Joining training of 6 weeks duration. This is conducted at the Institute of Naval Medicine and involves refresher and update training in primary and emergency care, medical administration and dental first-aid. The Maritime component involves exercising on board HMS Bristol. Those completing the commando component practice field exercises in the Role 1 and 2 field medical environments at Commando Logistic Regiment Medical Squadron. Included in the pre-joining training is the Battle Field Advanced Trauma Life Support course (BATLS).

=== Commando Medical Assistant ===
Royal Navy Medical Assistants who volunteer for service with the Royal Marines must pass the All Arms Commando Course (9-weeks) held at the Commando Training Centre Royal Marines (CTCRM) in Lympstone, Devon. Prior to this the Pre-All Arms Commando Course (4 weeks, Commando Logistic Regiment) must be taken to ensure candidates are suitable, selected and prepared prior to the All Arms Commando Course. The MA branch is also open to Royal Marines who are designated as Royal Marines Medical Assistants (RMMA). Those that go on to work with reconnaissance sections of 3 Commando Brigade complete the basic military parachutist course.

=== Medical Assistants working in support of United Kingdom Special Forces ===
Those (Commando trained or Royal Marine Commando normally) who have completed at least two operational tours and have passed the arduous Black Serpent course can be selected to provide medical support to UK Special Forces (UKSF) for either the Special Air Service (SAS), Special Reconnaissance Regiment (SRR), Special Forces Support Group (SFSG) or the Special Boat Service (SBS). They then go on to complete the basic military parachutist course and, if required the HAHO and HALO Para courses.

==== Black Serpent selection and training ====
The Black Serpent course is Tri-Service and open to RN, RAF and Army personnel. It is run by the Medical Support Unit (MSU), Hereford and features various physical and other tests including a hills phase with march routes across the Brecon Beacons similar to those done for UKSF selection. Candidates will be expected to carry out simulated medical treatments during these marches. The goal of such exercises is to test a medic's ability to successfully perform while under pressure and exhausted.

=== Submariner Medical Assistant ===
Those who volunteer for Service in the Submarine Service are responsible for the monitoring of air and water supplies and carrying out vital health and environmental safety checks. The training is undertaken at HMS Sultan in Gosport and at the Institute of Naval Medicine in Alverstoke. On completion of this training, Medical Assistant Submariners, MA(SM)'s are awarded a City and Guilds Certificate in Radiation Protection and optional membership of the Guild of Radiation Workers.

=== Additional qualifications ===
Other additional specialisations open to the MA Cadre are the newly formed Paramedic Sub Cadre. Others may transfer to become a Pharmacy Technician and Operating Department Practitioner. These were previously additional qualifications which are civilian accredited and have become Medical Technician branches.

== Insignia/badge ==
The insignia of the Medical Assistant badge is the Red Cross of Geneva on a white background with gold circling. A Royal Crown above the insignia denotes that the rating is qualified at the senior rate level (PO).

== Rating structure ==
The branch structure of the Medical Assistant follows the same as structures of the other branches of the Royal Navy.

- Medical Assistant 2 (under training) (MA 2)
- Medical Assistant (MA)
- Leading Medical Assistant (LMA)
- Petty Officer Medical Assistant (POMA)
- Chief Petty Officer Medical Assistant (CPOMA)
- Warrant Officer Medical Assistant Class 2 (WO2MA)
- Warrant Officer Medical Assistant Class 1 (WO1MA)

== Medical Services Officer ==
Suitably qualified and recommended ratings and ranks at OR-4 level and above are eligible for selection to become Medical Services Officers (MSO). This commissioning pathway is now open to the wider Armed Forces and is not restricted solely to Medical Assistants.

Successful candidates undertake their initial officer training at Britannia Royal Naval College (BRNC) Dartmouth. Historically known as "Wardmasters," MSOs are commissioned officers who provide essential policy, guidance, and managerial expertise to the Royal Navy Medical Service and the wider Tri-service environment. Career progression within this specialisation is substantial, allowing officers to advance to the rank of Commodore (OF-6).

== See also ==
- Combat Medical Technician
- Hospital corpsman
- Kate Nesbitt
- Medical assistant
- Royal Navy Medical Service
