= Military Medical Business =

Military Medical Business (Военно Санитарное Дело) was one of the professional medical journals of the Worker's and Peasant's Red Army (RKKA). The journal was published monthly in Moscow. Between 1938-1940, each issue cost 1 ruble and 50 kopecks. A 12-month subscription to the journal for the year 1939 cost 18 rubles. The Moscow publishing house published a total of 33 different professional medical journals for the RKKA in the year 1939. The Leningrad publishing house published five different journals that same year. Four different serials were also published by the Moscow publishing house under the title Central Medical Abstract Journal. By the end of 1940, the price of a single issue of Military Medical Business had increased to 2 rubles. The Moscow publishing house advertised 33 different journals, the Leningrad publishing house advertised 5 journals, and the Kazan publishing house advertised 1 journal for the year 1941. A 12-month subscription to Military Medical Business cost 30 rubles in 1941. The Moscow publishing house also advertised four serials under the title Central Medical Abstract Journal for the year 1941.

== 1938 topics and articles ==
In 1938, Military Medical Business published articles on the following topics: The political and organizational questions of the cadre and general questions, Therapeutic-prophylactic questions, Medical tactics, Questions of medical support of aviation and the mechanized unit, Questions of medical support of the Navy, Questions of medical-chemical defense and anti-aircraft defense, Questions of hygiene, epidemiology and disinfection, and general reviews of articles.

The following titles are examples of the 21 articles published on The political and organizational questions of the cadre and general questions:

- 20 Years of the Red Army
- Sworn Enemies of the People
- Physical Preparation and the Medical Corps
- On Questions about the Preparation of Operating Nurses

Examples of the 93 articles and 13 abstracts on Therapeutic-prophylactic questions include:

- An Operation for the Stopping of a Hemorrhage
- The Organization and Function of the Medical Regiment in the Army of the U.S.A.
- Transfusion of Blood in the Navy

An example of the 29 articles and 9 abstracts on Medical tactics:

- About Combined Evacuation

Among the 33 articles and 13 abstracts on Questions of medical support of aviation and the mechanized unit include the following titles:

- Physical Preparation of Parachutists
- Function of Eyes in Flight

The following is an example of the 4 articles on Questions of medical support of the Navy:

- The Transfusion of Blood on a Battle Ship

An example of the 5 articles and 1 abstract on Questions of medical-chemical defense and anti-aircraft defense:

- Surgical Anesthesia in the Circumstances of a Chemical Attack

The following two titles are examples of the 40 articles and 6 abstracts on Questions of hygiene, epidemiology and disinfection:

- Nutritive Concentrate
- The Fight with Parotitis

The 4 reviews of articles includes:

- Instruction to the Field Unit for the Transfusion of Blood

== 1939 articles ==
A complete listing of all published articles, abstracts, and article reviews was not published in the final issue of Military Medical Business in 1939. The following are titles of articles from the various issues published in 1939.

- The Medical Card of the Forward Area
- The Practice of Political Work in the RKKA
- More on the Transfusion of Blood
- The XXIV All Union Conference of Surgeons
- Materials for the Trophic Disorder of the Limb from the Cold
- Stalin and the Red Army
- About Anesthesia on the Leg of Evacuation in the Military Area
- Military Medical Business in the Time of the French Bourgeois Revolution

== 1940 topics and articles ==
In 1940, Military Medical Business published articles on the following topics: The political and organization questions of the cadre and general question, Medical tactics, Therapeutic-prophylactic questions, Questions of medical support of aviation and the mechanized unit, Questions of medical-chemical defense and anti-aircraft defense, Questions of hygiene, epidemiology and disinfection, and general article reviews that were not classified under any of the above headings.

Examples of the 19 articles and 3 abstracts on The political and organization questions of the cadre and general question include:

- About the Tactical Preparation of Military Doctors
- The Preparation of Military Doctors in Germany
- The XXII Anniversary of the Red Army

The following are titles of some of the 33 articles and 8 abstracts on Medical tactics:

- The Employment of Dogs for the Evacuation of Wounded
- About Medical Dogs
- Common Questions of the Organization of Surgical Aid in the Military Area

The following titles were among the 98 articles and 13 abstracts on Therapeutic-prophylactic questions:

- Medical Materials of the German-Polish War of 1939
- The Organization of Aid and Treatment of Maxillofacial Area Wounds in Military Operations of the Red Army in 1939 and 1940
- Examination in Military Neuropathology

Included among the 51 articles and 21 abstracts on Questions of medical support of aviation and the mechanized unit are:

- The Work of the Doctor at the Aerodrome
- Noise Trauma in Artillery

There were 5 articles and 4 abstracts on Questions of medical-chemical defense and anti-aircraft defense, including the following title:

- About the Use of Chemical Weapons in the Italian-Abyssinian War

Among the 41 articles and 7 abstracts on Questions of hygiene, epidemiology and disinfection were the following titles:

- About Effective Instrument Disinfection in the Nutritive Bloc
- The Method and Practice of the Control of Medical-Epidemiological Maps

The following titles were among the 15 reviews of articles not classified under the previous headings:

- The Military-Medical Manual for the Surgical Assistant
- About the Film "The Transfusion of Blood"
