= P Company =

Training and selection organisation of the British Armed Forces

Pegasus Company (also known as P Company or P Coy) is a training and selection organisation of the British Armed Forces based at the Infantry Training Centre, Catterick, North Yorkshire. P Coy run the 'Pre-Parachute Selection' courses for Parachute Regiment recruits and regular and reserve personnel from across the UK armed forces who volunteer to serve in a parachute role within 16 Air Assault Brigade.

16th Air Assault Brigade Combat Team insignia.

== Background ==
Pre-Parachute Selection must be undertaken by all British Army candidates regular and reserves under the age of 40 for parachute training who have not already undergone an "arduous" form of training, such as UK Special Forces, the All Arms Commando Course and the All Arms Ranger Course.

Training at P Coy culminates in a series of eight tests undertaken over a 5-day period (starting on a Wednesday and finishing on a Tuesday, with the weekend off). For recruits directly joining the Parachute Regiment, the tests are attempted at week 21 of training, All-Arms candidates attempt the tests after two and a half weeks of build-up training (Army Reserve preparation training usually spread over a number of weekends). Officer Cadets in UOTCs may also attempt the reserve All-arms course, in the same way the wider Army Reserve can, to attempt to earn a Maroon Beret, but only upon the Officer Cadet completing the 'Ex Maroon Student' training course and the Preparation Course Army Reserve.

Upon successful completion of the course, candidates earn the right to wear the Maroon Beret of 16 Air Assault Brigade, candidates participate in the Basic Parachute course which is conducted with assistance from the Parachute Training Support Unit (PTSU) on the base of RAF Brize Norton, Oxfordshire.

== Eight Tests ==
All events are scored, except the trainasium event which is a straight pass or fail. The total score required to pass is 45, with 10 points (maximum) being awarded for each test.

Army Reserve candidates must achieve the same standard as their regular counterparts.

=== 10 Miler ===
A 10-mile (16 km) march conducted as a squad over undulating terrain. Each candidate carries a 35 lb (16 kg) 'bergen' backpack (not including water) and a rifle, which weighs 5 kg. The march is to be completed in under 1 hour 50 minutes.

The event takes place on the Wednesday morning.

=== Trainasium ===
A unique assault course set 60 feet (18 m) above the ground, designed to test a candidate's suitability for military parachuting, and their ability to overcome fear and follow simple orders at considerable height. This is the only event which is a straight pass or fail; all the other events are scored.

The event takes place on the Wednesday afternoon.

=== Log Race ===
A team event, in which eight people carry a log (a telegraph pole) weighing 60 kg over 1.9 miles (3.1 km) of undulating terrain. Candidates wear a helmet and webbing. This is supposed to be one of the hardest events. Points are awarded for determination, aggression and leadership.

The event takes place on the Thursday morning.

=== Steeplechase ===
A timed 2.2-mile (3.5 km) cross-country run, with water obstacles, followed by an assault course. The steeplechase is to be completed wearing a helmet and boots. The march must be completed in 19 minutes.

The event takes place on the Thursday afternoon.

=== 2 Mile March ===
An individual effort over 2 miles (3.2 km) of undulating terrain, carrying a 35 lb (16 kg) bergen (not including water), rifle, combat jacket, and helmet. Regular candidates have 18 minutes to complete the run.

The event takes place on the Friday morning.

=== 20 Mile Endurance March ===
A 20-mile (32 km) squadded march over the Catterick or Otterburn Training Areas. Candidates carry a 35 lb (16 kg) bergen (not including water) and a rifle, which weighs 5 kg. The march must be completed in under 4 hours and 30 minutes.

The event takes place on the Monday morning and afternoon.

=== Stretcher Race ===
Candidates are divided into teams of 12 people, and have to carry a 176 lb (80 kg) stretcher over a distance of 5 miles (8.0 km), each individual candidate wears a helmet, webbing and a slung rifle. No more than 4 candidates carry the stretcher at any given time, swapping round at regular intervals so that all candidates carry the stretcher for a certain distance.

The event takes place on the Tuesday morning.

=== Milling ===
In this event, each candidate is paired with another of 'similar weight and build', and is given 60 seconds to demonstrate 'controlled physical aggression' in a milling contest - similar to boxing, except neither winning, losing, nor skill are pre-requisites of passing. Candidates are instead scored on their determination and aggression, while blocking and dodging result in points deducted. Candidates wear head guards, gum shields and boxing gloves.

The event takes place on the Tuesday afternoon and is the final test of P Company before the beret parade where recruits, addressed as 'Joes' by training staff, find out whether they have passed and earned their Maroon Beret.

== Women ==
In 2020, Capt Rosie Wild of 7 Para RHA became the first woman to pass All Arms Pre-Parachute Selection.

In 2022, Pte Addy Carter of 16 Medical Regiment became the first female enlisted soldier to pass All Arms Pre-Parachute Selection.

In 2023 Lieutenant Hannah Knapton of Parachute Regiment became the first woman to serve as a platoon commander in a regular battalion.
