= Loblolly boy =

Age of Sail-era name for a ship's surgeon assistant

Loblolly boy is the informal name given to the assistants to a ship's surgeon aboard British and American warships during the Age of Sail. The name derives from a porridge traditionally served to sick or injured crew members.

The term is no longer used; in the modern era naval surgeon's assistants are medical assistants in the Royal Navy, and hospital corpsmen in the U.S. Navy.

== Etymology ==
The name comes from the serving of loblolly — a thick porridge, sometimes enhanced with chunks of meat or vegetables—to sick or injured crewmembers to hasten their recovery. Loblolly, in turn, probably comes from the fusion of lob, a Yorkshire word meaning to boil or bubble, and lolly, an archaic English word for a stew or soup. Loblolly itself eventually came to mean anything viscous, such as a swamp or bog, and terms such as the Loblolly pine were coined from the muddy habitat of the tree rather than from any culinary use.

The name was first used to describe Royal Navy surgeon's assistants in 1597. The rating was also used in U.S. Navy warships from the late 18th century until 1861, when the name surgeon's steward was introduced to reflect more stringent training requirements. The name was changed to apothecary in 1866, and again in the 1870s to bayman and then in the early 20th century to Pharmacist's Mate and then the present term,Hospital Corpsman. The Royal Navy name changed to sick berth attendant. in 1833, with the nickname "Sick Bay Tiffy" (Tiffy being slang for artificer) gaining popularity in the 1890s. Medical Assistant is the current term.

The term has also appeared in fiction over several centuries. In Tobias Smollett's 1748 novel The Adventures of Roderick Random, the protagonist Random was made a loblolly boy upon entering the Royal Navy. Smollett himself claimed to have been a loblolly boy during his naval career, though as a surgeon's mate rather than surgeon's assistant his role did not strictly fit within the definition of the term. Loblolly boys also appear in C. S. Forester's Horatio Hornblower novels, Alexander Kent's Midshipman Bolitho novels, and Patrick O'Brian's Aubrey–Maturin novels. Stephen Maturin's loblolly boy, Padeen, features in several of O'Brian's books.

== Duties ==
The loblolly boy's duties included serving food to the sick, but also undertaking any medical tasks that the surgeon was too busy (or too high in station) to perform. These included restraining patients during surgery, obtaining and cleaning surgical instruments, disposing of amputated limbs, and emptying and cleaning toilet utensils. The loblolly boy also often managed stocks of herbs, medicines and medical supplies.
