= United States Navy Health Care =

The United States Navy Health Care organization consists of more than 4,300 physicians, 1,200 dentists, 3,900 nurses, and 2,600 administrative, research and clinical specialists. These sailors work on all Navy ships, within Medical Treatment Facilities, and serve on the front lines with Marine Corps Units while providing health care to servicemembers located on bases worldwide. Sailors within Navy Health Care work behind the scenes, as well as on the front lines, to provide physical and mental health care to fellow servicemembers. The men and women in Navy Health Care also provide rapid humanitarian assistance services for people in countries affected by catastrophe or conflict. In addition to providing care to Navy servicemembers and their families, the Navy Health Care Team also supports the Marine Corps, Coast Guard and their dependent populations.

== Navy service areas ==
The Navy Medical Department consists of four Officer Corps: the Navy Medical Corps, which is made up of physicians; the Navy Nurse Corps; the Navy Dental Corps; and the Navy Medical Service Corps, which consists of 22 communities including Environmental Health, Clinical Psychology and Health Care Administration. Sailors serving within the Enlisted medical community are Navy Hospital Corpsmen, a Corps that has more Medal of Honor recipients than any other Navy Enlisted specialty.

== Navy land support ==
There are four major medical centers located within the United States that are operated by the Navy. East Coast commands include the Naval Medical Center Portsmouth, located in Virginia, Naval Medical Center Camp Lejeune, located in North Carolina, and the Walter Reed National Military Medical Center, formally known as the National Naval Medical Center and colloquially referred to as the Bethesda Naval Hospital, located in Bethesda, Maryland, which is the primary health care provider for the President and his family. On the West Coast, there is the Naval Medical Center San Diego. Along with these medical centers, there are hospitals and clinics located on all Navy bases across the globe.

== Navy sea support ==
In addition to the medical centers and clinics on bases, there are Sailors in the medical sea support system serving on all deployed Navy ships. The U.S. Navy also operates two Hospital Ships, the USNS Mercy and the USNS Comfort. These floating full-service hospitals are stationed on the east and west coasts of the United States, respectively, and are deployed to provide emergency care to U.S. combat forces as well as to support U.S. disaster relief and humanitarian operations worldwide.

== Navy scholarship and financial aid programs ==
The United States Navy offers scholarship opportunities to prospective Sailors interested in a career in health care in exchange for service as commissioned Officers in the Navy. These programs and opportunities include:

- Health Professions Scholarship Program (HPSP), which covers all medical or dental school expenses as well as providing a monthly stipend
- Health Services Collegiate Program (HSCP), which provides financial assistance for tuition and housing as well as a salary to those already in medical or dental school
- Financial Assistance Program (FAP), which provides financial assistance for tuition as well as an annual grant and monthly stipend
- Health Professions Loan Repayment Program (HPLRP), which provides financial assistance to those already practicing in the health care industry by repaying their loans
- Nurse Candidate Program (NCP), which provides financial assistance for tuition as well as a grant and a monthly stipend
