= 68th Theater Medical Command =

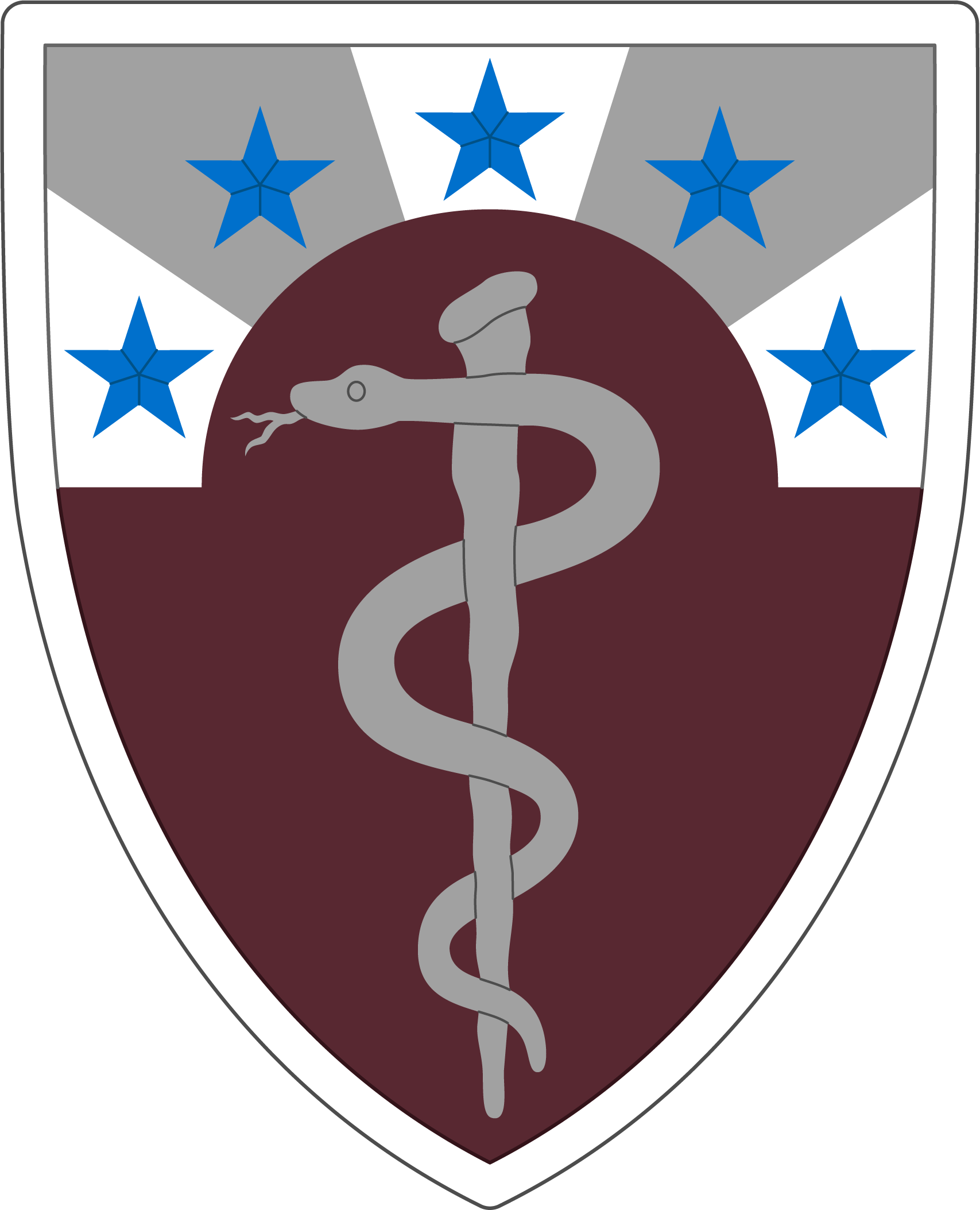
- Shoulder sleeve insignia
- Active: 1 June 1941 - 27 June 1946 27 July 1954 - 30 June 1972; 21 October 1978 - 15 December 1994 20 September 2023 - Present
- Country: United States
- Allegiance: US Regular Army
- Branch: United States Army
- Type: Medical command
- Part of: United States Army Europe and Africa
- Motto: Conserve Power
- Colors: Maroon and white
- Anniversaries: 3 June
- Engagements: World War II; Vietnam War; Cold War
- Battle honours: Meritorious Unit Commendation (Army), Streamer Embroidered: Vietnam 1966-1967; Vietnam 1967-1968; Vietnam 1968-1970 Vietnam 1970-1971

Commanders
- Current commander: BG Lance Raney
- Notable commanders: Lieutenant General Charles C. Pixley, MC; Major General William A. Boyson, MC

Insignia
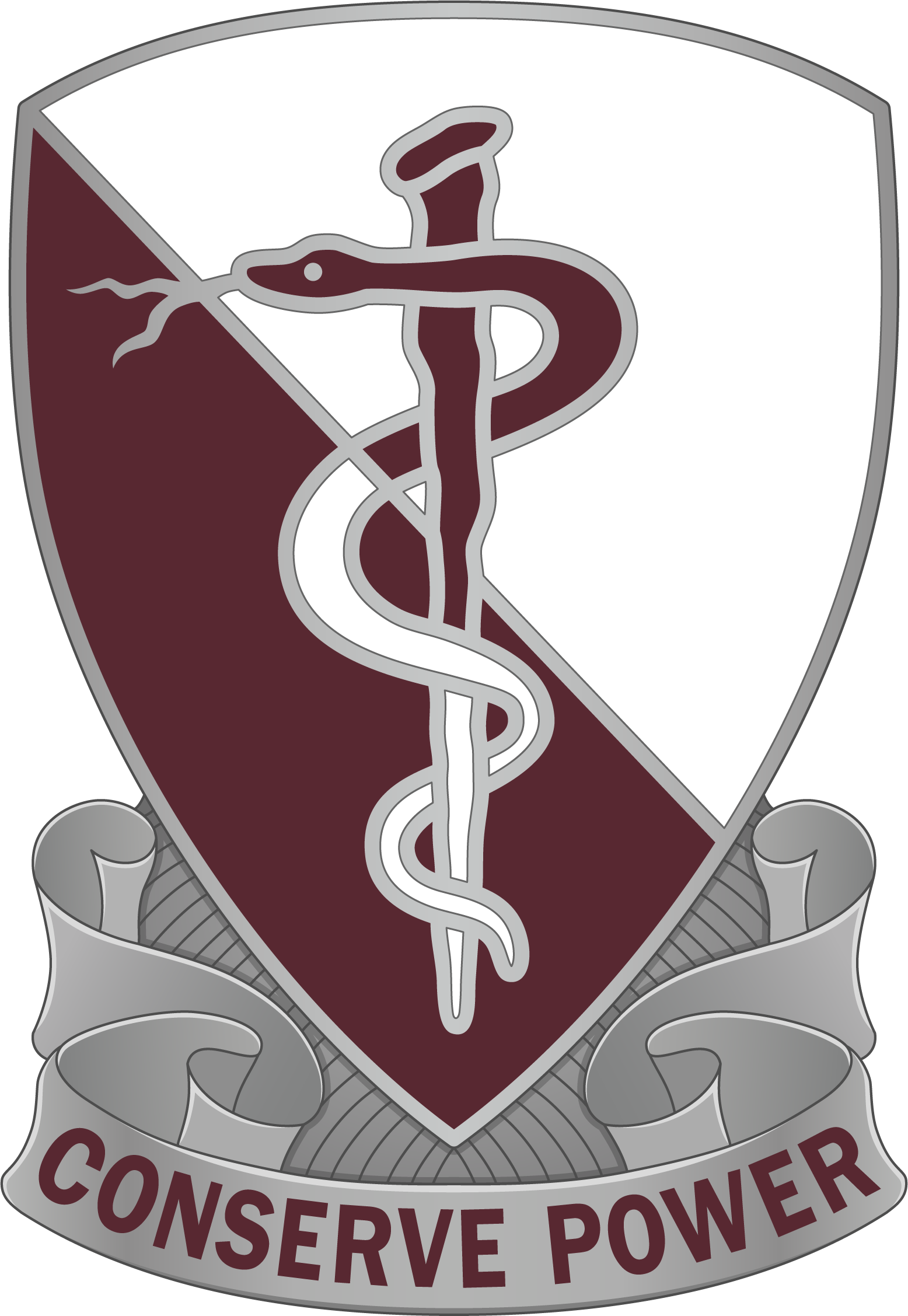
- 68th Medical Command DUI

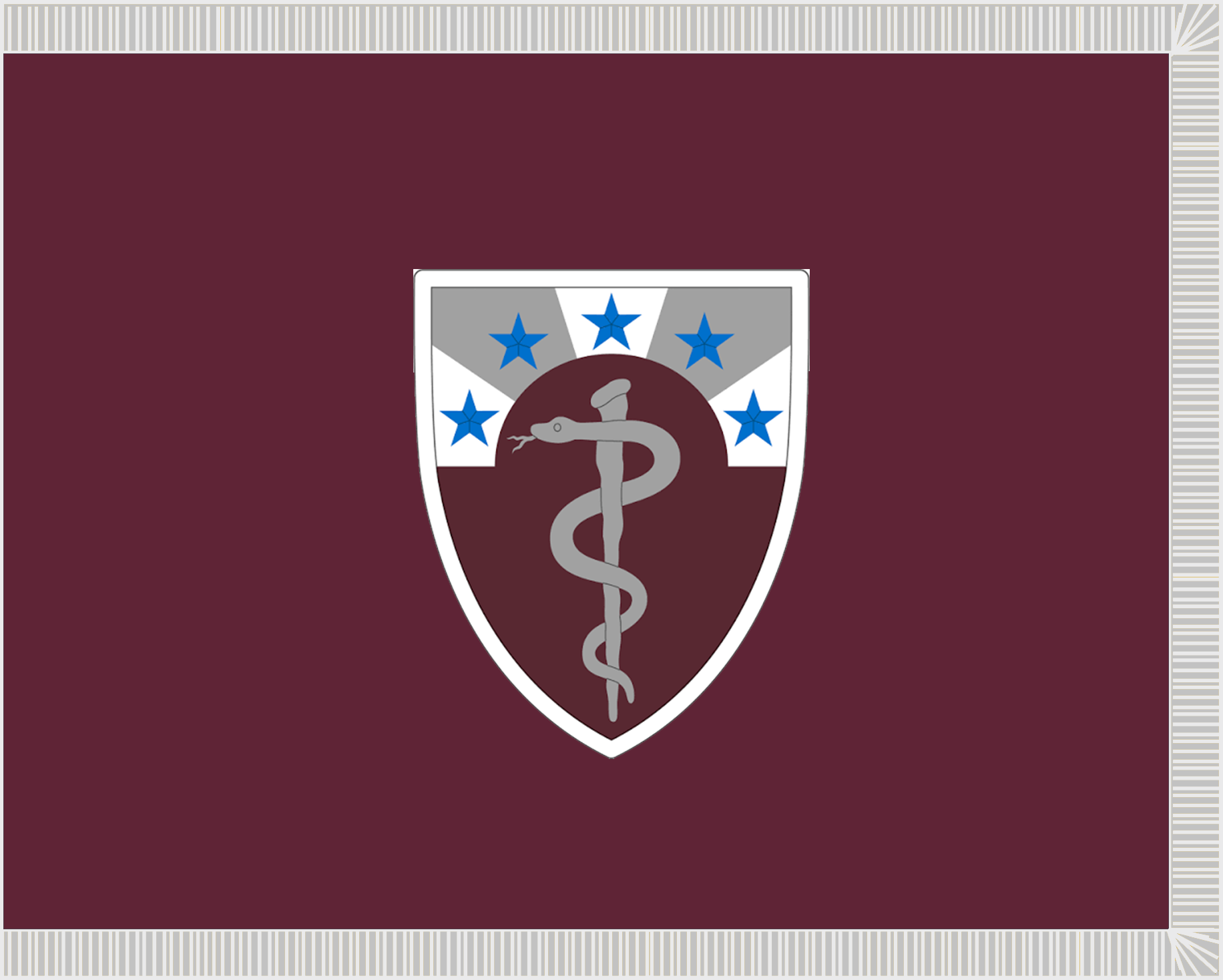
- 68th Medical Command Flag

The 68th Theater Medical Command (68 TMC) was constituted on 18 October 1927 in the US Regular Army as the 18th Medical Regiment. Redesignated as the 68th Medical Regiment and reorganized as the 68th Medical Group, the organization served in combat in Europe in World War II and in the Republic of Vietnam. During the Cold War, it was stationed at Fort George G. Meade, Maryland from 1954 until its deployment to Vietnam and was reactivated again in Germany, where it served from 1978 into the 1990s. On 21 September 2023, it was redesignated as the 68th Theater Medical Command and activated at Sembach, Germany.

== Lineage ==
- Constituted on 18 October 1927 in the Regular Army as the 18th Medical Regiment.
- Activated (less Company A) on 1 June 1941 at Camp Forrest, Tennessee.
  - Company A activated on 3 June 1941
- Re-designated on 3 June 1941 as the 68th Medical Regiment.
- Regiment broken up 15 September 1943 and its elements reorganized and redesignated as follows:
  - Headquarters and Headquarters and Service Company as Headquarters and Headquarters Detachment, 68th Medical Group.
  - Company A as the 449th Medical Collecting Company - hereafter separate lineage.
  - Company B as the 450th Medical Collecting Company - hereafter separate lineage.
  - Company C as the 451st Medical Collecting Company - hereafter separate lineage.
  - Company D as the 617th Medical Clearing Company - hereafter separate lineage.
  - Company E as the 452d Medical Collecting Company - hereafter separate lineage.
  - Company F as the 453d Medical Collecting Company - hereafter separate lineage.
  - Company G as the 454th Medical Collecting Company - hereafter separate lineage.
  - Company H as the 618th Medical Clearing Company - hereafter separate lineage.
- Headquarters and Headquarters Detachment, 68th Medical Group Inactivated 27 June 1946, in Germany.
- Headquarters Detachment redesignated Headquarters and Headquarters Detachment, 68th Medical Group, 17 June 1954.
- Activated 27 July 1954 at Fort George G. Meade, Maryland.
- Inactivated 30 June 1972 at Fort Lewis, Washington.
- Activated 21 October 1978 in the Federal Republic of Germany.
- Inactivated 15 December 1994 in Germany
- Redesignated 21 September 2023 as 68th Theater Medical Command and activated in Germany

== Honors ==
=== Campaign participation credit ===
- World War II
  - Normandy
  - Northern France
  - Rhineland
  - Ardennes-Alsace
  - Central Europe
- Vietnam
  - Counteroffensive
  - Counteroffensive, Phase II
  - Counteroffensive, Phase III
  - Tet Counteroffensive
  - Counteroffensive, Phase IV
  - Counteroffensive, Phase V
  - Counteroffensive, Phase VI
  - Tet 69/Counteroffensive
  - Summer-Fall 1969
  - Winter-Spring 1970
  - Sanctuary Counteroffensive
  - Vietnam Counteroffensive Phase VII
  - Consolidation I
  - Consolidation II
  - Vietnam Cease-fire

=== Decorations ===
- Meritorious Unit Commendation (Army) for:
1. Vietnam 1966-1967
2. Vietnam 1967-1968
3. Vietnam 1968-1970
4. Vietnam 1970-1971

== History ==
=== The Organized Reserves ===
The 18th Medical Regiment was constituted, or added to the roles of the Regular Army, on 18 October 1927. It was allotted to the Second Corps Area and assigned to the II Corps. It was organized as a Regular Army Inactive unit with members of the Organized Reserve Corps on 9 September 1930 with its headquarters in Rochester, New York. Reserve personnel were assigned from New York and New Jersey, and the unit's designated mobilization training station was the Syracuse Mobilization Camp. New York City elements of the regiment typically conducted their Inactive Training Period meetings at 641 Washington Street in New York City, and the regiment conducted summer training at Carlisle Barracks with the 1st Medical Regiment. On 1 June 1941 the regiment would be organized as an Active Army Regiment and redesignated as the 68th Medical Regiment on 3 June 1941. The regiment was assigned to the Second Army on 24 September 1941. The regiment participated in the Second Army/VII Corps maneuvers in Camp Robinson/Arkadelphia, Arkansas from 11–30 August 1941 and the Second Army-Third Army GHQ Maneuvers during the Louisiana Maneuvers from 15–28 September 1941.

=== World War II ===
==== 1943 ====
Following the overseas voyage, the 68th Medical Group was completely reunited on 17 December 1943 at Camp Kingwood Common, Oxfordshire, England. The Camp was a 750-bed hospital plant with Nissen-hut construction of stucco and beaverboard, located a few miles from Henley on Thames (Oxfordshire) and Reading, Berks, and formerly occupied for a brief period by troops of a British Armored Division.

==== 1944 ====
From 1 January to 1 March 1944, the following changes in organization of units took place:
Attachments:

Unit	Date
HHD, 57th Medical Battalion	14 January 1944
575th Medical Company (Ambulance)	7 February 1944
576th Medical Company (Ambulance)	7 February 1944
577th Medical Company (Ambulance)	1 March 1944
578th Medical Company (Ambulance)	7 February 1944

Relieved from Attachment:

Unit	Date
453d Medical Company (Collecting)	15 February 1944
617th Medical Company (Clearing)	1 March 1944
618th Medical Company (Clearing)	1 March 1944
662d Medical Company (Clearing)	1 March 1944

After several minor inter-Battalion changes of attached units, the group organization as of 11 March 1944, was:

- HHD, 68th Medical Group
- 57th Medical Battalion
  - HHD, 57th Medical Battalion
  - 575th Medical Company (Ambulance)
  - 576th Medical Company (Ambulance)
  - 577th Medical Company (Ambulance)
  - 578th Medical Company (Ambulance)
- 175th Medical Battalion
  - HHD, 175th Medical Battalion
  - 449th Medical Company (Collecting)
  - 450th Medical Company (Collecting)
  - 451st Medical Company (Collecting)
- 176th Medical Battalion
  - HHD, 176th Medical Battalion
  - 452d Medical Company (Collecting)
  - 454th Medical Company (Collecting)

In accordance with Training Circular #1, Headquarters First United States Army, 24 November 1943, intensive training with emphasis on physical conditioning and small unit training began on 1 January 1944 in preparation for the forthcoming channel crossing and military operations in France.

Exercises with the 44th and 45th Evacuation Hospitals utilized collecting and ambulance companies and stressed the methods of transportation of patients to and from the evacuation hospitals and the reinforcement of the hospitals with litter bearer and technical personnel.

School for drivers, assistant drivers, and motor officers and non-commissioned officers was conducted in both the practical and theoretical aspects of waterproofing and during the Normandy landings, no vehicle of the group had engine failures.

With the aid of personnel of the 327th Glider Infantry Regiment, 101st Airborne Division, and selected personnel of the 68th Medical Group, all personnel of the 451st and 452nd Medical Companies (Collecting) were trained in the care of the M-1903 rifle, marksmanship, and manual of arms. The purpose of this training was to provide a reserve of trained medical troops for guarding medical installations from marauders. Response to this training was very enthusiastic, and results could be adjudged from the fact that 93% of personnel qualified at 200 yards with 20 inch bullseye after two weeks of training.

Allotments to schools were liberally distributed, with personnel attending the European Theater of Operations' Medical Field Service School, Army School of Hygiene, Transport Quartermaster School, Medical and Surgical Technicians School, Cooks and Bakers School, and schools providing instructions in Neuropsychiatry, mines and booby traps, bomb disposal, camouflage, chemical warfare, advances in medicine, plaster techniques, enemy documents and military intelligence.

In addition to housing the entire personnel of the group, the camp also quartered the personnel of the 177th Medical Battalion (134th Medical Group), the 962nd Engineer Company, the 989th Engineer Company and 1091st Engineer Detachment. The 68th Medical Group Headquarters was designated the Camp Headquarters with the Commanding Officer of the group, Colonel Francis P. Kintz, MC, functioning as Camp Commander and the group staff sections functioning in similar capacities. Not the least of the problems encountered was that of the conversion of the camp buildings into hospital structures suitable for the use of the hospital units which were to occupy the area subsequent to the departure of the group and the invasion of France. This work was carried out by British civilian companies and required close contact between the group staff and American and British (military and civilian) engineers of all echelons and necessitated frequent changes in billeting plans for the Camp.

Units of the group arranged for the reception, billeting and indoctrination of various organizations in and around Kingwood Common, and the group Operations Section, from ll-16 April conducted a course in waterproofing of vehicles for selected officers and enlisted personnel of all army medical units. In addition to academic instruction, the course included practical demonstrations involving the immersion and operation of all types of government vehicles in both fresh and salt water to a depth of 3 1/2 feet.

During the stay at this location, many constructive changes in the physical makeup of the Camp were undertaken. Concrete walks were built, landscaping and beautification projects were initiated, and a quadrangle was filled in and constructed, in the middle of which was erected a flagpole, the latter requiring later re-erection following its destruction by a low-flying transport plane.

All units of the 68th Medical Group arrived in England without TO&E equipment. Immediately upon arrival, units received releases for items of Basic Equipment. Approximately five months passed before all units of the group became totally equipped. One problem that presented difficulties was the excessive travel and time consumed in order to pick up released items. Many of the group's units traveled over a hundred miles to general depots to pick up items that could have been shipped to or released from general depots that were only ten or fifteen miles from the group's location. Messing facilities, equipment, and rations were adequate while in England.

During the stay in England, a camp Post Exchange, first opened on 24 December 1943, was operated for all units stationed at Kingwood Common which included as many as 1800 officers and enlisted men. Facilities and supplies, including rationed items, were excellent. The volume of sales was large, and personnel also availed themselves of the opportunity to purchase mail-order gifts thru the Army Exchange Service for delivery in the United States.

Special Service activities included bi-weekly movies, bi-monthly USO shows; distribution of Army publications; competitive athletic programs of baseball and volleyball; distribution of radios, athletic equipment, and supplies; tours to historic places of interest; training of discussion leaders and organization of an orientation program; publicity for the Armed Forces Institute; language courses in French, Spanish, and German; operation of an Enlisted Men's club, and Officers• Club, and a library of all types of literature; and organization of weekly dances for Enlisted Men.

Relations between military personnel and civilians in the neighborhood of Kingwood Common were most cordial, and officers and enlisted men frequently accepted English hospitality and the opportunity to further Anglo-American relations and enhance the understanding between themselves and their English allies.

In April, the 68th Medical Group Headquarters, in conjunction with the 31st and 134th Medical Groups, held a tea and reception at Camp Kingwood Common in honor of Brigadier General John A. Rogers (then Colonel), Surgeon, First United States Army, which presented the Officers of the three medical groups the opportunity to meet the Army Surgeon and his staff. A second reception was held at the Camp to which approximately a hundred residents of the community were invited, members of the British Home Guard, and mayors of near-by towns in gratitude for their kindness and hospitality during our stay in the vicinity.

On 17 May 1944, the Headquarters and Headquarters Detachment 68th Medical Group, along with the Headquarters and Headquarters Detachments of the 175th and 176th Medical Battalions, and the 576th and 578th Medical Companies (Ambulance),

departed from home station, Kingwood Common, Henley-on-Thames, Oxon, for the concentration area, at Hengar, St Tudy, Cornwall.

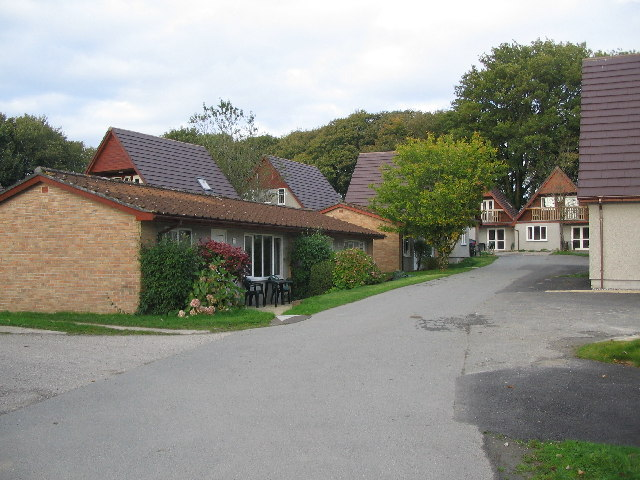
Hengar, concentration area for the 68th Medical Group Headquarters in June 1944

On 31 May 1944 the group commander, Colonel Kintz, departed the group for the purpose of accompanying the 450th Medical Company (Collecting) on the cross-channel attack, and upon his departure Lt. Col. Joseph H. Bornstein, MC, assumed temporary command of the group.

The headquarters then proceeded to marshalling area F-3, one mile south of Chacewater, Cornwall on 12 June 1944, arriving at its assigned embarkation area at Falmouth, Cornwall on 13 June 1944, boarding Liberty Ship S.S. James B. Weaver the same day. The ship weighed anchor on 15 June, and the voyage was uneventful. The ship arrived off Omaha Beach at 2000 hours on 16 June, but unloading was delayed until the next morning due to enemy air activity. The transfer of equipment and personnel from ship to landing barge and then to the beach was completed on 17 June, with all equipment landed in excellent condition. The headquarters was directed to Transit Area# 2, but moved within the hour to the group command post, which had been established south of Saint-Laurent-sur-Mer.

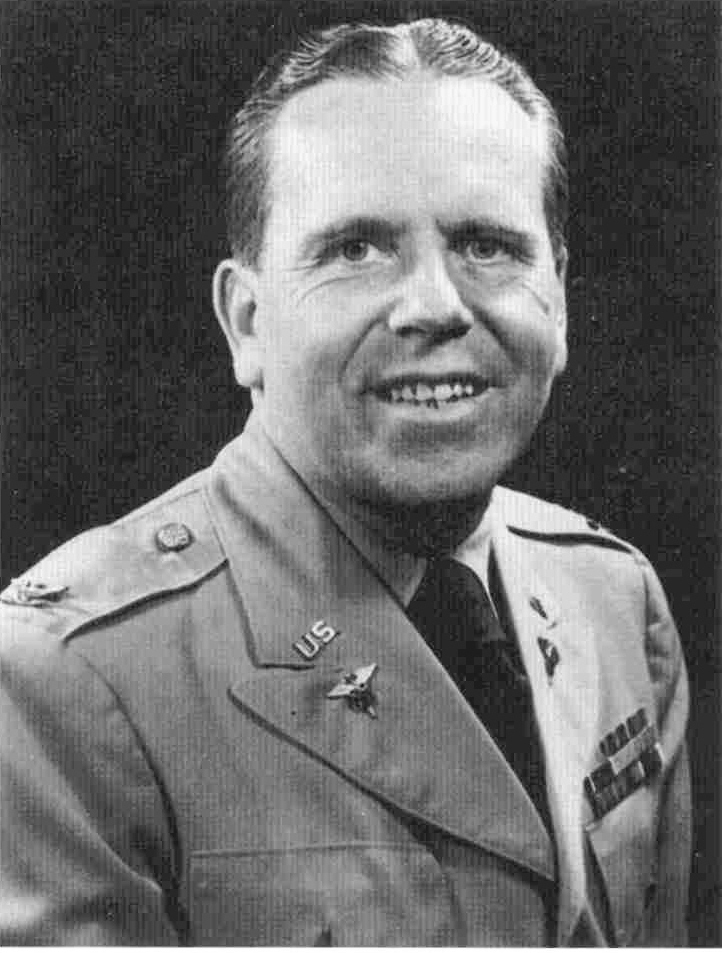
Colonel Bernard Aabel, Chief, U.S. Army Medical Service Corps.As a major on 7 June 1944, he took a party from the 68th Medical Group ashore on Omaha Beach to coordinate patient evacuation and medical unit reception

On 24 May, the Group S-2 and Liaison Officer, Major Bernard Aabel (later Chief of the Army Medical Service Corps and Namesake of Aabel Hall at the U.S. Army Medical Center of Excellence, together with the S-2s of the 175th and 176th Medical Battalions (Lts Eugene P. Hickey and John N. Crichton) and three medical officers and 54 enlisted men each from the litter and station platoons of the 451st and 454th Medical Companies (Collecting), joined Detachment "A" of the group headquarters at Cookham, Berkshire, accompanying this detachment on a hospital transport to Omaha Beach. Upon their arrival on 7 June, Major Aabel, Lt Hickey and Lt Crichton served with the Army Medical Evacuation Officer, in connection with the location, reception and orientation of incoming Army medical units. The medical officers were attached to the 60th and 61st Medical Battalions and the 1st and 2d Infantry Divisions, and the enlisted men to the 60th and 61st Medical Battalions and the 2d Infantry Division. Group personnel attached to Detachment A were returned to duty with the group on or about 19 June.

On 31 May, Colonel Kintz, group commander, and Major Kaunitz, group operations officer, departed the concentration area in Hengar, Cornwall, to join the 450th Medical Company (Collecting) near Maidenhead, Berkshire. They accompanied the company to marshalling area C-14, in Southampton on 7 June, embarking on the SS Edward D. White from Southampton on 10 June. Following an uneventful voyage, they debarked on Omaha Beach, Normandy, on 12 June. The group command post was established at 2000 hours on 12 June, above Easy "White" beach and moved, with all debarked units— the 449th Medical Company (Clearing) (plus the battalion executive officer of the 175th Medical Battalion), the 450th Medical Company (Clearing), and the 452nd Medical Company (Clearing) (plus the battalion commander of the 176th Medical Battalion), and the 577th Medical Company (Ambulance), to bivouac north of Formigny on 13 June. The group became operational at 2100 hours on 14 June, when a provisional battalion, with Lieutenant Colonel Ralph H. Shilling, MC, commanding, and composed of the 449th, 450th and 452nd Medical Companies (Collecting) and one platoon of the 383rd Medical Company (Clearing), which had been attached to the group headquarters from the 6th Engineer Special Brigade, was organized to furnish division medical service to the 30th Infantry Division. This provisional battalion was in operation for two days, being relieved by the 30th Division's 105th Medical Battalion when it became operational. Beginning on 14 June, and as more subordinate units debarked, the group gradually assumed the evacuation of division clearing stations, field hospital platoons and evacuation hospitals. Ambulances of Ambulance Companies were used for the first two functions, with ambulances of the collecting companies for the latter; the collecting companies were stationed in the vicinity of evacuation hospitals, with medical officers, technicians and litter bearers working at the hospital. By D+10 a complete Army Evacuation Service was established and the complete complement of group headquarters personnel arrived 17 June.

On 21 June, the group, with its command post located in the vicinity of Formigny, was reorganized along functional lines, with one ambulance company in group reserve, as follows:

- HHD, 68th Medical Group
- 578th Medical Company (Ambulance)
- 57th Medical Battalion
  - HHD, 57th Medical Battalion
  - 576th Medical Company (Ambulance)
  - 451st Medical Company (Collecting)
- 175th Medical Battalion
  - HHD, 175th Medical Battalion
  - 575th Medical Company (Ambulance)
  - 449th Medical Company (Collecting)
  - 450th Medical Company (Collecting)
- 176th Medical Battalion
  - HHD, 176th Medical Battalion
  - 577th Medical Company (Ambulance)
  - 452nd Medical Company (Collecting)
  - 454th Medical Company (Collecting)

The 175th Medical Battalion was assigned the XIX Corps sector, and the 176th Medical Battalion the V Corps sector, with responsibilities for all evacuation to the rear of division clearing stations and evacuation from Evacuation Hospitals to the Beach Evacuation Center. The 57th Medical Battalion was given the responsibility for evacuating the 2d and 3d Armored Divisions.

Lt Hickey, S-2, 175th Medical Battalion, remained on duty with the Army Medical Evacuation Officer and continued to aid in processing medical units arriving on Omaha Beach. During the period 17-21 June, personnel of the 617th Medical Company (Clearing), the 618th Medical Company (Clearing), and the 3d Auxiliary Surgical Group were received and quartered at the 68th Medical Group Headquarters bivouac area pending final disposition.

There were 6,324 patients evacuated from division clearing stations, field hospitals and evacuation hospitals by units attached to the group from D-day to D+15 inclusive.

During this period and until the end of July, one Medical Administrative Corps officer of the group headquarters remained on duty with the Army Medical Evacuation Officer and continued to aid in processing medical units arriving on Omaha Beach.

The group had been assigned the mission of evacuating divisions on the left half of the First Army front to evacuation hospitals, and evacuating evacuation hospitals to the beach holding units. In addition, collecting companies of the group reinforced evacuation hospitals with their officers, technicians and litter bearers. Prophylactic stations were maintained in Isigny-sur-Mer, Grandcamp-Maisy and Trévières.

During the stay at Formigny, units of the group on many occasions furnished transportation for newly arrived units from transit areas to the group bivouac area, bivouac and mess facilities, and transportation of the units to their first station on French soil. Units serviced, in addition to those previously listed, included:

- 35th Evacuation Hospital
- 4th Convalescent Hospital
- 2d Evacuation Hospital
- 12th Field Hospital
- Officer replacements

On 26 June, the 438th Medical Company (Collecting) was attached to the group and was immediately attached to the 57th Medical Battalion.

From 28 June to 1 July, the group undertook the evacuation of German casualties and medical personnel from the Cherbourg-en-Cotentin area. Activities in connection with this mission formed the basis of a special report submitted to the Surgeon, First United States Army, entitled: "Report of Evacuation of Enemy casualties from Vicinity of' Cherbourg."

On 3 July, the 594th Ambulance Company was attached to the group and remained as group reserve until 17 July.

On 10 July, the group Command Post moved to the vicinity of Colombières, a distance of approximately 9 miles. At this time, units of the group were evacuating patients from the 35th, 1st, 2d, and 30th Infantry and the 2d and 3d Armored Divisions, and servicing and evacuation or the 2d, 5th, 24th, 44th, and 45th Evacuation and 4th Convalescent Hospitals. The same day the 384th Medical Company (Collecting) and the 546th Medical Company (Ambulance) were attached to the group.

On 15 July, one officer and 2 enlisted men of the 452d Medical Company (Collecting) established a dispensary servicing POW Enclosure #3. Two ambulances of the 577th Medical Company (Ambulance) were also assigned to evacuate the installation.

On 20 July, a penetration operation was planned by VII Corps. In anticipation of this, the 57th Medical Battalion was assigned responsibility for evacuation of the east half of the VII Corps front, including the 4th and 30th Infantry Divisions and 2d Armored Division. The 176th Medical Battalion was assigned the 2d, 5th and 35th Infantry Divisions, and the 175th Medical Battalion, the 28th and 29th Infantry Divisions. Two officers from the group headquarters were placed on temporary duty with the 57th Medical Battalion to aid in maintaining liaison between that Headquarters and the divisions being evacuated, and the officers remained on that status for the duration of the operation.

On 28 July, units of the group were evacuating the 2d, 4th, 29th, 30th, and 35th Infantry Divisions and the 2d Armored Division, as well as the 2d, 24th, 44th, 106th and 109th Evacuation Hospitals.

On 31 July, and for a period of three days thereafter, 20 ambulances from ADSEC, COMMZ and 40 from the 31st Medical Group were put on temporary duty with the group for the purpose of augmenting evacuation capabilities.

On 2 August, Group CP moved to vicinity of Saint-Ébremond-de-Bonfossé approximately 30 miles from their previous location.

Beginning 2 August, the mission of the group was the evacuation of all division and corps clearing stations in First Army. These included V Corps, XIX Corps, and VII Corps and 1st, 2d, 4th, 5th, 28th, 29th, 30th, and 35th Infantry Divisions and the 2d and 3d Armored Divisions. The 57th, 175th and 176th Medical Battalions were assigned the VII, XIX and V Corps sectors respectively.

The group organization effective 2 August was:

- HHD, 68th Medical Group
- 546th Medical Company (Ambulance)
- 57th Medical Battalion
  - HHD, 57th Medical Battalion
  - 450th Medical Company (Collecting)
  - 451st Medical Company (Collecting)
  - 576th Medical Company (Ambulance)
  - 578th Medical Company (Ambulance)
- 175th Medical Battalion:
  - HHD, 175th Medical Battalion
  - 449th Medical Company (Collecting)
  - 452d Medical Company (Collecting)
  - 384th Collecting Company (Ambulance) [sic]
  - 575th Medical Company (Ambulance)
- 176th Medical Battalion:
  - HHD, 176th Medical Battalion
  - 454th Medical Company (Collecting)
  - 577th Medical Company (Ambulance)

The 68th Medical Group remained responsible for evacuation of Field Hospitals.

On 6 August the group command post moved approximately 25 miles to Villebaudon, and again on 13 August to Boisyvon, another 25 miles.

on 16 August, the group's organization was:

- HHD, 68th Medical Group
- 546th Medical Company (Ambulance)
- 57th Medical Battalion
  - HHD, 57th Medical Battalion
  - 450th Medical Company (Collecting)
  - 454th Medical Company (Collecting)
  - 578th Medical Company (Ambulance)
- 175th Medical Battalion:
  - HHD, 175th Medical Battalion
  - 449th Medical Company (Collecting)
  - 452d Medical Company (Collecting)
  - 384th Collecting Company (Ambulance) [sic]
- 176th Medical Battalion:
  - HHD, 176th Medical Battalion
  - 454th Medical Company (Collecting)
  - 575th Medical Company (Ambulance)
  - 576th Medical Company (Ambulance)
  - 577th Medical Company (Ambulance)
- 177th Medical Battalion
  - HHD, 177th Medical Battalion
  - 13th Field Hospital
  - 42nd Field Hospital
  - 45th Field Hospital
  - 47th Field Hospital
  - 51st Field Hospital

Field Hospitals were employed adjacent to division clearing stations according to instructions from the First United States Army Surgeon's Office.

The 57th, 175th and 176th Medical Battalions retained their responsibility for evacuation within the VII, XIX and V Corps sectors respectively.

On 22 August the group command post moved to the vicinity of Senonches, a distance of approximately 130 miles.

On 25 August, the group was assigned a new mission, employing field hospitals in the role of evacuation hospitals, continuing the evacuation of all division and corps clearing stations in Army area, and the evacuation of all field hospitals.

On 31 August the group command post moved to the vicinity of Guyancourt, a distance of approximately 70 miles.

Statistics(*) for the period 13 June to 31 August inclusive, were:

Ambulance Mileage -	930,968 miles	
Average per ambulance -	2,821 miles	
Ambulance patient trips -		85,679
Evacuated from	Evacuation Hospitals	23,432
	Convalescent Hospitals	1,589
	Combat Exhaustion Center	1,650
	Field Hospitals	3,339
	Clearing Stations	55,669

- Statistics in this report include Battle, Non-Battle, and PW casualties.

During the Battle of Saint-Lô, a problem of no little importance was the equitable distribution of cases among the several Evacuation Hospitals then in operation. Appropriate ambulance control points were set up and active liaison was established with these and with division clearing stations. Despite the constant contact maintained with the hospitals, most of them were overwhelmed when the casualty rate increased markedly. This situation forced the hospitals further to the rear to receive the overflow of patients and to remain open longer than was planned. It also decidedly increased the length of the average ambulance trip from clearing station to hospital. Another difficulty was the filling of quotas of patients for various open hospitals. With the relatively great distance between clearing stations and hospitals, and between hospitals and army headquarters, and the great dispersion of hospitals and clearing stations, not only was there a necessary time lag between announcement of quotas and the time these quotas could be made effective, but ambulances were often led well away from the shortest direct route between clearing station and hospital in order to fill these quotas.

After the break-through at Saint-Lô, the casualty rate was lower, but although Evacuation Hospitals were distributed over the Army area, the rapid movement of troops and, consequently, clearing stations, kept the hospitals well to the rear and again required long ambulance hauls.

During the period when the mission of the 68th Medical Group was the evacuation of all division and Corps clearing stations in First Army, additional vehicles were sometimes required to maintain proper coordinated liaison laterally, as well as in depth.

When the Field Hospitals assumed the function of Evacuation Hospitals, the problem of evacuation was considerably eased because of the low casualty rate, the short ambulance trip required, and the organization of hospitalization by corps sectors.

The punctual transmission of daily reports from the Infantry Division Clearing Stations, and more especially the Armored Treatment Platoons, to Base Echelon was also a problem, since the latter was at times 200 to 300 miles behind the Division areas. Constant shelling and the danger of being cut-off were factors confronting the group's company messengers which impeded delivery and accounted for the loss of at least one officer and enlisted man; and the hazards of blackout driving took their toll of vehicles in the group headquarters.

In general, though none of the problems were insurmountable, those encountered were in the main due to the fluidity of the tactical situation and the resultant extreme distances which separated the various medical, tactical and administrative installations.

On 4 September the group command post moved to La Capelle, a distance of 150 miles, where a concentration area for army medical units was set up. The group made the reconnaissance of this new area, arranged for engineering operations, and apportioned suitable sub-areas in the vicinity to various units.

On 12 September the group CP moved to Ouffet, Belgium, a distance of 85 miles, where another concentration area was being established, and on 15 September to Eupen, a distance of approximately 40 miles. On this latter move several members of the organization detoured en route for the short-lived privilege of touching German soil.

On 15 September, the first anniversary of the formation of the 68th Medical Group from the 68th Medical Regiment, Colonel Kintz commemorated the occasion in a letter to all units which contained a brief history of the organization, a commendation of all officers and enlisted men for their splendid cooperation and the efficiency of their work, and expressed the hope that the 68th would continue to render to front line troops the best medical service possible.

On 18 September 384th Medical Collecting (Ambulance) Company was detailed on Temporary Duty with the British Second Army as a part of a medical task force in connection with airborne operations involving the 82d and 101st Airborne Divisions, Operation Market Garden.

On 27 September, the group headquarters moved indoors for the first time since arriving on the continent, into a former school building at 18 Heidberg Strasse, Eupen, where the protection and advantages afforded by a fairly modern structure more than outweighed the disadvantages caused by the slight increase in the incidence of minor respiratory complaints. This site would be the location of the group headquarters until 24 December.

Until 20 September the principal missions of the group had been:

1. The evacuation of casualties from all field hospitals, infantry and armored division clearing stations, and corps clearing stations in the First United states Army, the responsibility for the VII, XIX and V Corps areas being charged respectively to the 57th, 175th and 176th Medical Battalions.

2. The employment of Field Hospitals in the role of evacuation hospitals:

a. one field hospital was placed in each corps sector while the remaining two hospitals were held in reserve. The hospitalization units of the hospitals in operation (each field hospital could operate three separate 100-bed hospitalization units or function as a single, 400-bed hospital) were located as close as possible to the infantry division clearing stations. When the forward movement of any clearing station required ambulances to transport patients over 20 miles from clearing station to its respective hospitalization unit, another unit was leap-frogged into position in close proximity to the clearing station, at which time the unit in the rear closed and usually remained at their site until all patients were evacuated. However, if the speed of the tactical advance made imperative the early need for the closed units, a clearing platoon, requested from the 134th Medical Group, would take over the non-transportable cases in the closed unit and hold them until they could be moved, permitting the hospital unit's personnel and equipment to move forward into operation. Transportation difficulties of this type of movement were solved by supplementing the organic transportation of the field hospitals with 10 trucks placed under the control of each of the three Medical Battalions charged with the evacuation.

b. Casualties during this period were low, averaging 533 patients transported daily from all division clearing and treatment stations in the entire Army area during the period September 1–19 inclusive.

3. The utilization of provisional truck companies, composed of 210 trucks and personnel on temporary duty from evacuation hospitals and a gas treatment battalion for the transportation of Army medical units.

a. From 25 August to 20 September, at time date the 57th Medical Battalion assumed control, the group was responsible for operation and maintenance of 210 trucks and trailers attached on temporary duty from various Army medical units (10 each-from the 5th, 24th, 41st, 44th, 45th, 67th, 91st, 96th, 97th and 128th Evacuation Hospitals, and 30 from 91st Medical Gas Treatment Battalion). At the time of attachment, trucks were in the act of transporting hospitals and medical supplies to the Senonches area.

b. The 454th and 449th Medical Companies (Collecting) were assigned to provide administration and maintenance for these vehicles, and second echelon work was performed by the motor maintenance section of the 177th Medical Battalion. One cook, three mechanics and 4 non-commissioned officers were attached to each of these companies to provide additional personnel, and maintenance sections were set up in the vicinity of group headquarters. The trucks were divided into two equal groups, each group reporting to 449th or 454th Medical Company (Collecting) motor pool. Drivers were fed at these companies, and trucks were inspected and serviced. No truck was allowed to depart before it was determined that proper preventive maintenance had been performed.

c. certain problems were met with in the operation of these trucks:

(l) During the period immediately preceding the assumption of control by the group, trucks had had little organized preventive maintenance. Some trucks were being driven without spare tires. A daily average of 12 trucks were deadlined during the period that this organization was providing maintenance, and many trucks required third echelon work. Care of these vehicles required the combined and continuous services of the two company and one battalion motor maintenance sections.

(2) Due to the nature of the assigned missions, trucks had to be dispatched in groups of two and three. Control was therefore difficult and although dispatch forms and trip tickets were made out, it was theoretically possible for drivers to make unauthorized stops en route. Routinely, a non-commissioned officer was placed in charge of each group of 5-10 vehicles, and an officer for each group of over 25 vehicles.

(3) Supply problems were encountered because the group headquarters advanced well ahead of the army service area and Corps Class III truckheads would issue no gasoline to the group's units. However, excellent cooperation was obtained from the army ordnance units, gasoline was initially hauled from Senonches, and later, following issuance of a blanket authorization, sufficient gasoline was obtained at local truckheads.

(4) Before leaving Guyancourt on 4 September, a liaison officer was dispatched to Senonches in order to coordinate reception and dispatch of vehicles from that point. When the group command post moved from the La Capelle area on 12 September, the 449th Medical Company (Collecting) remained in La Capelle and the 454th Medical Company (Collecting) accompanied the group headquarters to Ouffet and later to Eupen. This arrangement furnished facilities for maintenance at both Eupen and La Capelle. Thus, the group had rear echelons extending over 300 miles; there was no communication except by truck or messenger; and the control of movement of trucks was therefore rendered difficult, particularly when trucks had to be dispatched from both locations.

On 20 September, First United States Army relieved the following units from attachment to the 68th Medical Group:

- HHD, 57th Medical Battalion
- HHD, 177th Medical Battalion
- 384th Medical Company (Ambulance)
- 575th Medical Company (Ambulance)
- 591st Medical Company (Ambulance)
- 546th Medical Company (Ambulance)
- 450th Medical Company (Collecting)
- 452d Medical Company (Collecting)
- 42d Field Hospital
- 45th Field Hospital
- 47th Field Hospital

The same order attached the 662d Medical Company (Clearing) to the 68th Medical Group, which had been attached to the British Second Army in connection with Operation Market-Garden.

At the same time the mission of the group was changed to include, within the VII Corps sector:
l. Employment of field hospitals adjacent to infantry- division clearing stations
2. Evacuation of clearing stations and field hospitals
3. Reinforcement of evacuation hospitals and division medical service
4. Providing transportation for movement of evacuation hospitals
5. Recommendation and clearance of new sites for evacuation hospitals
6. Transmission of periodic and combat statistical reports to the First Army Surgeon's Office

The mission of servicing the VII Corps, which at that time was composed of the 1st and 9th Infantry Divisions and the 3rd Armored Division, was to remain the responsibility of the group throughout the remainder of the year, during which time many different divisions were attached to and detached from the Corps and many different evacuation hospitals received the Corps' casualties.

The group organization on 20 September was:

- HHD, 68th Medical Group
- 454th Medical Company (Collecting)
- 175th Medical Battalion
  - HHD, 175th Medical Battalion
  - 576th Medical Company (Ambulance)
  - 577th Medical Company (Ambulance)
  - 578th Medical Company (Ambulance)
  - 13th Field Hospital
  - 51st Field Hospital
- 176th Medical Battalion
  - HHD, 176th Medical Battalion
  - 449th Medical Company (Collecting)
  - 451st Medical Company (Collecting)
  - 662d Medical Company (Clearing)
  - 584th Medical Company (Ambulance)

Responsibility within the group was subdivided as follows:

175th Medical Battalion
l. Evacuation of division clearing and treatment stations
2. Evacuation of Field Hospitals
3. Employment of Field Hospitals
4. Transmission of reports from clearing station and field hospitals

176th Medical Battalion
1. Reinforcement of evacuation hospitals
2. Transfers from evacuation hospitals
3. Operation of ambulance control points for distribution of patients to evacuation hospitals
4. Transmission of reports from evacuation hospitals

Statistics for the month of September and thru the campaign until 30 September were as follows:

	1-30 September	Total for Campaign
Ambulance Mileage	311,853 miles	1,242,821 miles
Average Mileage per ambulance	1,291 miles	4,112 miles
Ambulance Patient trips	20,205	105,884
From		
Evacuation Hospitals	799	24,231
Field Hospitals	5,823	9,162
Clearing stations	13,583	69,252

The enthusiasm and friendliness of the Belgians, especially at Ouffet, prompted the group to engage the voluntary services of 10 soldiers, recruited from the ranks of the Belgian White Army, to control the civilians by day and to stand guard by night. These men performed their functions efficiently and courteously, and on three occasions were forced to resort to the use of fire-arms to protect United states Government property. In one instance their fire was returned by an intruder whose obvious objective was the gasoline dump. In none of these instances was there any definite evidence of enemy activity.

During critical shortages of blankets and litters occasioned by the temporary break-down of the property exchange system at certain Communication Zone installations, the group supply section transported German blankets and litters from the captured dump at Ciney to the Army Medical Supply Dump. This section also obtained 150 German litters and 8,000 German blankets from a captured warehouse in Verviers and delivered them to the First Army dump for distribution to Army medical units.

The problem of the punctual transmission of daily reports from the Division Clearing Stations to Base Echelon was eased somewhat during September by the movement of the latter Headquarters to the vicinity of Verviers, and also by the previously mentioned change of mission, effective 20 September, which limited the responsibility of the group, for the performance of this function, to the medical and tactical units in VII Corps only.

The daily staff meetings of the group headquarters, presided over by the commanding officer and designed to disseminate all information to, and coordinate the efforts of, all members of the staff, gradually developed during September into general conferences attended by the commanding officers, or representatives, of a majority of the medical units and installations located in the vicinity. After the reports of the three group liaison officers on the tactical and medical situations in the Anny, and the presentation by the Plans and Operations Officer of the evacuation plan to and from, and the conditions existing in, the various installations serviced by the group, the conferences were opened to general discussion of supply, transportation, and related topics. Visiting officers often contributed pertinent information to these conferences which were attended by an average of 30 officers daily, and which, due to the enthusiasm of all concerned, proved to be a highly effective method of securing cooperation and an invaluable source of information.

During the 15-day advance of approximately 200 miles, the 68th Medical Group managed the evacuation of eight infantry divisions, two armored divisions, and three corps clearing stations. Despite gasoline shortages, the group maintained continuous evacuation and operated five mobile field hospitals close to the front lines. The operation was facilitated by a lower casualty rate during the rapid advance.

On 6 October, two Enlisted Men of the 577th Medical Company (Ambulance) were awarded the Bronze Star Medal for saving the lives of three other enlisted men who had been trapped in a burning ammunition truck. Presentation of the award to one of the men was made by Colonel Kintz, the group commander, on 14 October at a ceremony at the 175th Medical Battalion. The other recipient was missing in action.

On 13 October the Belgian Guards the group had acquired were ordered to return to duty at Dolhain. New guards were then obtained from the Belgian Secret Army Headquarters at Eupen. After their demobilization from the Belgian Army a few days later, six of these men continued on duty as guards during the hours of darkness.

On 19 October, Major General Paul R. Hawley, ETOUSA surgeon, toured Battalion Aid stations and Field Hospitals in VII Corps with Colonel Kintz. At the regular evening conference, General Hawley commended the work of the Field Hospitals and remarked upon the value and scope of the information discussed at the conference.

On 21 October, following the surrender of Aachen, a reconnaissance was conducted in order to determine the number and location of German casualties remaining in the city, and to search for buildings suitable for army medical installations. A total of 17 casualties were found in two hospital bunkers, and the Stadtisches Elisabeth Krankenhaus, Johann Marien Hospital and Displaced Persons Barracks (Triererstrasse) were inspected as to their suitability for housing medical installations.

The 662d Medical Company (Clearing) continued to support the 7th Armored Division and the 82nd and 101st Airborne Divisions. On 22 October, First Army placed this company (effective as of 20 September) under control of 21st Army Group for supply and operations.

The same orders also attached the 633d Medical Company (Clearing) to this Headquarters, and on 26 October the company set up its clearing station at Welkenraedt, Belgium, where it assumed the following functions:
1. Medical and Dental dispensary for Army Troops stationed in the VII Corps sector
2. Treatment in station of Army Troops referred by dispensary
3. Treatment in station of mild upper respiratory diseases transferred from division and corps clearing stations in VII Corps sector.

A check of all units attached to this Headquarters as of 27 October showed that 2 enlisted had been killed in action while 10 enlisted and one officer were listed as missing in action.

On 27 October two officers from the American School Center visited and remained at group headquarters studying the functions and organization of a medical group for inclusion in the curriculum of the proposed school at Soissons.

On 29 October the Group S-2, Major Aabel, was awarded the Purple Heart for facial lacerations received from shell fragments in the vicinity of Kornelimünster, Germany.

During October and subsequent months many V-1 flying bombs were audible and a few were observed passing overhead. These missiles appeared with intermittent regularity and caused more curiosity than concern, although the latter had increased toward the end of the year due to the increased accuracy of this weapon.

Several instances involving gun-fire on the part of the Belgian Guards also occurred during the night hours. In one, an unknown marauder opened fire from ambush without being seen or challenged. Some 50 shots were exchanged but no known casualties resulted.

Soldier Voting activity continued throughout October. In accordance with directives, all personnel were given the opportunity to vote and an election day was set aside. Many enlisted and officers utilized State Absentee Ballots, but comparatively few used the Federal Balloting units. A Soldier Voting Inspector from the Adjutant General's Office visited group headquarters and explained the procedure to be followed in connection with keeping certificates and forwarding records.

During October, and lasting until the German counter-offensive in December made its retention perilous, the group operated a "Rest Camp" in Malmedy, Belgium, a few miles from the German border where the 1st Infantry Division was to make its gallant stand. The "Rest Camp", operated by a small detachment of enlisted, was established in a 16-room Chalet, provided relaxation and amusement on a 3-day rotation plan for all group personnel who cared to attend, and was enthusiastically received by all concerned.

Due to the relative inactivity of the front-line troops deployed along the Siegfried Line, the casualty rate for October was comparatively low, especially during the last ten days of the month. No problems of supply or evacuation were encountered. Following are the statistics for October and the compilation to date:

	1-31 October	Total for Campaign
Ambulance Mileage	103,922 Miles	1,346,743 Miles
Average per Ambulance	693 Miles	4,805 miles
Ambulance patient trips	9,706	115,590
From Evacuation Hospitals	2,112	26,343
From Field Hospitals	232	9,394
From Clearing stations	7,359	76,611
From Army Clearing stations	3	3
From Combat Exhaustion Center	—	1,650
From Convalescent Hospital	—	1,589

During the period l November to 24 December, the group responsibilities included:
1. Employment of field hospitals for the treatment of non-transportable cases from 1st, 4th, 8th, 9th, 28th, 83d and 104 Infantry Divisions and the 3d and 5th Armored Divisions. Field Hospitals were stationed in Roetgen, Stolberg and Eschweiler, Germany.
2. Evacuation of the clearing stations of the 1st, 4th, 9th, 28th, and 83d infantry Divisions, the 3d and 5th Armored Divisions, and VII Corps.
3. Evacuation of 13th and 51st Field Hospitals.
4. Evacuation of 96th and 97th Evacuation Hospitals to ADSEC hospitals.
5. Transfers from 2d, 5th, 45th, 96th, 97th, and 128th Evacuation Hospitals to other Army units.
6. Reinforcement with litter bearers and technicians of 2d, 5th, 45th, 96th, 97th and 128th Evacuation Hospitals, and of the 1st, 4th, 9th, 83d and 104 Infantry Divisions.
7. Maintenance of army medical and dental dispensaries, and of army clearing stations for treatment of mild upper respiratory diseases referred by division and corps clearing stations, army dispensary and evacuation hospitals. When patient flow was heavy, hospitals took advantage of this opportunity for disposing of mildly ill upper respiratory patients who could be treated in clearing stations.
8. Return of duty patients from combat exhaustion center and army clearing stations.
9. Transmission to Army Surgeon's office of periodic and combat statistical reports of all units mentioned above and message center service for all medical units in Eupen area.

On 8 November, because of serious T/O shortages of litter bearers in the divisional medical detachments, and in anticipation of tactical operations through the dense, wooded terrain of the Hurtgen Forest and of severe losses among medical personnel, the VII Corps Surgeon requested additional litter bearers be furnished. Accordingly, on 8 November the 68th Medical Group placed a total of 99 enlisted on a loan basis, as follows:
1st Infantry Division: 80 enlisted
4th Infantry Division: 19 enlisted
These enlisted were drawn from group units, with the exception of 40 enlisted furnished by the 445th Medical Collecting Company (57th Medical Battalion).

Following a request by the VII Corps Surgeon for further reinforcement, the 439th and 450th Medical Companies (Collecting) and 40 enlisted of the 479th Medical Company (Ambulance) were made available on loan basis to the group headquarters on 17 November. On 20 November, a total of 266 enlisted men were on loan from the group, as follows:
1st Infantry Division: 131
4th Infantry Division: 99
104th Infantry Division: 36

On 23 November, 190 non-medical enlisted replacements were placed on temporary duty with the group from the 3rd Replacement Depot for a period of 10 days (later extended to 20 days). These enlisted were given 4 1/2 hours of instruction, within the group, in transportation of wounded, application of improvised splints, first-aid bandage and tourniquet, and in their rights and duties under the Geneva Convention. They were then sent on loan to divisions, as follows:
1st Infantry Division: 114
4th Infantry Division: 40
104th Infantry Division: 36
This provided further reinforcement for these divisions, in addition to allowing rotation of litter bearers previously furnished and relief of a sufficient number to permit adequate reinforcement of open evacuation hospitals. All personnel of the 479th Medical Company (Ambulance) had been returned to their company on or before 26 November.

Casualties during November among all litter bearer personnel loaned to divisions were:

Total litter bearers loaned to Divisions	456
KIA	4
WIA	46
MIA	6
Combat Exhaustion	2
Non-battle Casualties	4
	_______
Total	62

From 1 November to 16 November, casualties within VII Corps sector were distributed among the 2d, 5th and 45th Evacuation Hospitals, all in Eupen. Cases from the 28th and 8th Infantry Divisions were taken to 2d Evacuation Hospital by ambulances of the 134th Medical Group. On 17 November, the 128th Evacuation Hospital opened for the reception of ambulatory patients. All loaded ambulances of the group reported to the group control point in Eupen, where ambulatory patients were transferred to other ambulances which delivered them to the 128th Evacuation Hospital. The litter cases were transported to the 2d, 5th or 45th Evacuation Hospitals. Approximately 50% of all cases arriving at the control point were ambulatory.

From 16 November, which was the beginning of the VII Corps offensive to the Röhr River, until 30 November, 11,916 casualties (of the month's total of 15,299) were transferred to evacuation hospitals from clearing stations by units of the group.

The 96th and 97th Evacuation Hospitals opened at Brand, Germany, on 22 and 25 November respectively, and patients from 1st and 104th Infantry Divisions were sent there on a daily quota basis, with the remaining cases going to the hospitals in Eupen. Liaison with the 428th Medical Battalion (ADSEC) was maintained, and units of the group evacuated patients from the 96th and 97th Evacuation Hospitals to ADSEC hospitals in Verviers, Belgium.

Effective 24 November 1944, the 459th and 468th Medical Companies (Collecting) were attached to the group headquarters, as was the 489th Medical Company (Ambulance), effective 29 December 1944, First Army.

Statistics for the month of November and for the campaign were:

	1-30 November	Total for Campaign
Ambulance Mileage	171,650 miles	1,518,393 miles
Average per Ambulance	1,009 miles	5,514 miles
Ambulance Patient Trips	18,256	133,846
From		
Evacuation Hospitals	2,165	28,508
Field Hospitals	284	9,678
Clearing Stations	15,299	91,910
Army Clearing station	508	511
Combat Exhaustion Centers	—	1,650
Convalescent Hospital	—	1,589

On 1 December the 13th and 51st Field Hospital were relieved of attachment to the 175th Medical Battalion and placed under direct control of group headquarters,

On 3 December the group headquarters observed the first anniversary of its departure from Camp Shanks, New York.

Effective 4 December the 458th Medical Company (Collecting) was attached to the group headquarters by the First Army. On 7 December, the 439th and 450th Medical Companies (Collecting) returned to the group from attachment to the 64th and 134th Medical Groups, respectively.

Also 7 December, 153 enlisted men from the 32nd General Hospital, and on 17 December, 150 enlisted men from the 25th General Hospital, were placed on TDY and were utilized as litter-bearers in evacuation hospitals supported by the group.

Effective 13 December the 493d Medical Company (Collecting) was attached to the group headquarters by First Army.

The 190 enlisted men on TDY with the group from the 3rd Replacement Depot were being utilized in the capacity of litter-bearers, replacing and reinforcing the division litter-bearers in the VII Corps sector. All these personnel were returned to the 3rd Replacement Depot by 14 December.

On 16 December the Germans began their counter-offensive which was to drive deep into the Allied lines in the Ardennes sector before it was repulsed. At that time group headquarters was still located at Eupen and evacuating the VII Corps divisions which were on the left flank (North) of the V and VIII Corps sectors between which the Germans drove their salient.

In connection with the drive, the Germans infiltrated commandos and bombed and shelled the town of Eupen intermittently between 16 —- 21 December during the night hours and strafed the roads sporadically during the day. No damage or casualties were suffered by group personnel, although one intense air-attack and several artillery shells damaged buildings in the immediate vicinity and injured several civilians. As a precautionary measure, guards and firewatchers were doubled and the 454th Medical Company (Collecting) set up its collecting station in the basement of the building it occupied, and personnel took adequate advantage of the air-raid shelters at their disposal.

In order to check von Rundstedt's westward drive which had almost reached Dinant on the Meuse River, a reorganization of the Armies had taken place in which the VII Corps Headquarters and Corps troops had been moved southwest to Mean to be in position to conduct active defense and, later, attack with 4 divisions, the powerful 2d and 3d Armored Divisions and the 75th and 84th Infantry Divisions, all of which had been ordered down from the North, and were to form the reorganized VII Corps.

Accordingly, the group headquarters, having again been assigned the mission of serving the VII Corps, moved some 50 miles Southwest to Huy (14 Rue Van Kerr), just east of the Meuse and a few miles west of Corps Headquarters at Mean. The group was also assigned the mission of reinforcing the 102nd Evacuation Hospital, which was located in Huy.

On 26 December the responsibility of the group was extended to include supporting, in addition to VII Corps, the XVIII Airborne Corps, —- less the 30th Infantry Division —- which included the 82d Airborne Division, the 106th Infantry Division, the 7th Armored Division, and Combat Command B of the 9th Armored Division, and the reinforcement of the 97th and 128th Evacuation Hospitals in Verviers, Belgium.

The same day the units attached to the group were reorganized. Previously the 175th Medical Battalion had been assigned the mission of evacuating all clearing stations, while the 176th Medical Battalion reinforced evacuation hospitals and transferred patients within the Army area. with the reorganization, the 175th Medical Battalion assumed both these functions within the VII Corps sector and the 176th Medical Battalion, both functions within the XVIII Airborne Corps sector.

Probably at no previous time had the flexibility and ease of adaptability of a medical group been more clearly illustrated than during this emergency when, in a matter of hours and with no confusion, the group withdrew from its responsibility of servicing 5 divisions and 5 evacuation hospitals and at the same time assumed the responsibility, many miles away, of servicing 8 other divisions and one (later two) evacuation hospitals.

At the end of December 1944, the group organization was:

- Group Headquarters
  - HHD, 68th Medical Group
  - 454th Medical Company (Collecting)
  - 450th Medical Company (Collecting)
  - 633d Medical Company (Clearing)
  - 13th Field Hospital
  - 51st Field Hospital
- 175th Medical Battalion
  - HHD, 175th Medical Battalion
  - 576th Medical Company (Ambulance)
  - 577th Medical Company (Ambulance)
  - 578th Medical Company (Ambulance)
  - 451st Medical Company (Collecting)
- 176th Medical Battalion
  - HHD, 176th Medical Battalion
  - 439th Medical Company (Collecting)
  - 449th Medical Company (Collecting)
  - 493d Medical Company (Collecting)
  - 489th Medical Company (Ambulance)
  - 584th Medical Company (Ambulance)

On 29 December the 51st Field Hospital opened at Wange, Belgium, 2 miles west of Huy, acting as an evacuation hospital in order to supplement the 102nd Evacuation Hospital.

During December 1944, four officers of group headquarters were awarded the Bronze Star Medal for meritorious service and nine enlisted of the group headquarters detachment received the Certificate of Merit from the group commander.

The 458th Medical Company (Collecting) at the end of the year was reported en route to report for duty with the group although neither it nor the 459th and 468th Medical Companies (Collecting), whereabouts of which were unknown, had reported by 31 December.

From the arrival in Normandy until the end of 1944 the group had supported at various times an aggregate of 27 different infantry and armored divisions and 14 different evacuation hospitals.

At the close of the year, among all the units attached to the group headquarters, exclusive of personnel on temporary duty from other organizations, 3 were listed as KIA and 16 as MIA

Statistics for the month of December and total figures for the entire European Campaign, were:

	1-31 December	Total for Campaign
Ambulance Mileage	219,019 miles	1,737,412 miles
Average per Ambulance	1,288 miles	6,802 miles
Ambulance Patient Trips	17,848	151,694
From:		
Evacuation Hospitals	2,480	30,988
Field Hospitals	341	10,019
Clearing stations	14,541	106,451
Army Clearing stations	486	997
Combat Exhaustion Centers	—	1,650
Convalescent Hospital	—	1,589

No problems in supply were encountered on the Continent, since dumps and depots were generally centrally located when the tactical situation permitted. Among all units attached to this Headquarters, 47 vehicles of all types required replacement due to accident, mechanical failure, and enemy action. These included 27 ambulances, 17 trucks ( 1/4 ton), 2 trucks (2 1/2 ton), and 1 truck ( 3/4 ton). The performance of 1/4 ton trucks indicated that the average life of the motors installed in this type of vehicle is approximately 24,000 miles under normal conditions encountered in this theater of operations by a headquarters unit.

==== 1946 ====
During the period 1 January to 7 March 1946, the 68th Medical Group was attached to the Seventh United States Army and was operating as a sub-section of the Office of the Surgeon, with its headquarters located in Königstein, Germany. During this period, three medical battalions, one medical gas treatment battalion, eight medical companies (collecting), six medical companies (clearing), five medical companies (ambulance), one medical company (sanitary), two medical detachments, three dental operating detachments, one dental prosthetic team, one medical depot company, two medical laboratories, one convalescent hospital, two field hospitals, four evacuation hospitals, three station hospitals and two general hospitals were attached to the group for operations or administration.

Operating in what was once the XXIII Corps area, the northern part of the American occupation zone south to a line running Rhine River—Darmstadt—Third United States Army boundary.

The group's mission in this area was:
1. Administration and personnel reassignment and redeployment of all medical unites.
2. Supervision and administration of all Prisoner of War (POW) hospitals.
3. Supervision and administration of all Displaced Persons (DP) and Return of Allied Military Personnel (RAMP) hospitals.
4. Inspection of medical facilities and medical supplies in all Internee Camps and DEP Enclosures.

The group's area of responsibility, equal in size to the State of Massachusetts, was divided into two provisional German hospital centers, arbitrarily designated the 100th Provisional German Hospital Center, operated by the 241st Medical Battalion, and the 300th Provisional German Hospital Center, operated by the 30th Medical Battalion, each assisted by their attached companies.

The group's area of responsibility, equal in size to the State of Massachusetts, was divided into two provisional German hospital centers, arbitrarily designated the 100th Provisional German Hospital Center, operated by the 241st Medical Battalion, and the 300th Provisional German Hospital Center, operated by the 30th Medical Battalion, each assisted by their attached companies.

The two provisional hospital centers each operated in different manners. The 241st Medical Battalion formed hospital teams from its companies; each team consisted of a Medical Corps officer and several enlisted. This team was tasked to supervise and administer the hospitals in a particular city or town. In the 30th Medical Battalion, each company was assigned a particular number of hospitals in an area to administer and supervise; the company officers worked out from their central location to inspect and administer the hospitals assigned to the company. In all hospitals, however, the actual operation of the hospital was conducted by former combatant medical personnel who had been taken prisoner.

The total number of hospital beds operated by the group on 1 January 1946 was greater than the available hospital beds in any one of 29 states in the United States, or more than all the hospital beds in Delaware, Nevada, New Mexico, North Dakota, Vermont, and Wyoming combined. At that time there were 27,301 beds in the hospital centers, 13,598 of which were occupied. Listed below are the locations and bed capacities of the 38 hospital centers supervised by the 30th and 241st Medical Battalions at that time:

LOCATION	BED CAPACITY
Arolsen	238
Korbach	412
Kassel	236
Ober Kaufungen	150
Witzenhausen	320
Bad Sooden	120
Eschwege	410
Bernhausen	740
Frankenberg	622
Haina	920
Homberg	390
Treysa	350
Hersfeld	500
Marburg	2,039
Herborn	2,365
Katzenfurt	300
Giessen	600
Bad Salzschlirf	1,800
Fulda	616
Limburg	640
Weilmünster	1,500
Bad Nauheim	1,241
Schlüchtern	215
Salmünster	325
Bad Orb	400
Bad Schwalbach	1,001
Idstein	1,300
Königstein	1725
Falkenstels	400
Oberursel	250
Bad Homburg	1,271
Hofheim	131
Frankfurt	680
Langen	785
Darmstadt (DEFE 11)	1,200
Darmstadt (RG)	152
Fritzlar	135
Babenhausen (DEFE 12)	802
	_______________
TOTAL	26,510

Below is the weekly bed and patient census for all hospitals supervised by the 68th Medical Group between 1 January and 7 March 1946:

	POW		RAMPS		DPS	
	Beds	Patients	Beds	Patients	Beds	Patients
4 January 1946	27,301	19,359	100	30	767	420
11 January 1946	26,824	18,343	100	50	767	468
18 January 1946	25,710	16,943	100	43	767	497
25 January 1946	25,243	16,943	100	27	767	489
1 February 1946	22,572	15,539	100	26	767	526
8 February 1946	20,568	13,860	100	27	737	500
15 February 1946	19,279	13,266	100	29	737	490
22 February 1946	18,051	12,277	100	31	753	345
1 March 1946	17,706	11,681	100	24	753	258

The downward trend of POW patients showed the success of the group's efforts to reduce the number of POW installations and attendant responsibilities. During the period the group was operational in 1946, these installations were reduced from 38 to 13, and the number of patients from 19,359 to 7,688.

This was accomplished by consolidating, closing out, and turning over hospitals to military governments, evacuating patients by hospital trains to other occupied zones and discharging others to either DEF enclosures or to civilian status. Those patients who were discharged and had not received maximum medical benefit were retained in those hospitals turned over to military government. In many cases POW medical personnel were discharged to civilian status at the same time and then retained in the same hospitals as part of the civilian staff. At the beginning of the year there were 4,410 POW medical personnel, but by the time the 68th Medical Group was inactivated on 7 March there were only 2,063.

Because of the redeployment of personnel and units and reduced operational requirements the 241st Medical Battalion was relieved of its mission on 4 February 1946 and the 487th Medical Company (Clearing) assumed their mission of operation and supervision of the 100th Provisional German Hospital Center on the same day. On 13 February the 487th Medical Company was attached to the 30th Medical Battalion, and while the 487th continued to operate the hospitals in the 100th, the 30th Medical Battalion supervised their operation as well as those hospitals in the 300th Provisional German Hospital Center.

In addition to administering and operating those POW installations, the group was also charged with the responsibility of supervising six Displaced Person hospitals and one RAMP hospital, which are listed below.

Displaced Person hospitals	
Location	Bed capacity
Wolfsanger	100
Bettenhausen	71
Ziegenhain	155
Fulda	118
Hanau	109
Wetzlar	214
RAMP hospitals	
Location	Bed capacity
Ziegenhain!	100

A further responsibility of the group was the supervision of medical facilities and medical supplies in all Internee Camps and DEF enclosures located in the group areas. Those installations were inspected on alternate days by Medical Corps officers and results of those inspections were reported weekly by the group headquarters to the Seventh Army Surgeon.

During the period the group headquarters was active in 1946, the primary function of the group's personnel section was the reassignment and redeployment of Medical Department officer and enlisted personnel of the Seventh United States Army, and Theater Service Forces, European Theater attached to the group for administration, operations, and redeployment.

These redeployments and reassignments resulted in an almost constant turnover of personnel within subordinate units. The replacement of personnel was very successful in most cases, with the exception that, at times, there were critical shortages of certain categories of personnel caused by the redeployment of eligible officer and enlisted personnel and an inadequate number of replacements. However, as more units were being redeployed and inactivated and the remaining units began to absorb the surplus personnel, the critical situation resolved itself.

Forty-five units were attached to the 68th Medical Group at some time during the period 1 January—7 March 1946. Those units, and their status as of 7 March 1946, were:

Units Still in Operation on 7 March 1946: 16
30th Medical Battalion (Separate)

- HHD, 30th Medical Battalion
- 487th Medical Company (Collecting)
- 559th Medical Company (Ambulance)
- 609th Medical Company (Clearing)
- 703d Medical Company (Sanitary)
- 775th Dental Detachment
- 776th Dental Detachment
- 777th Dental Detachment
- 858th Medical Detachment
- 861st Medical Detachment

4th Medical Laboratory
97th General Hospital
115th General Hospital
280th Station Hospital
317th Station Hospital
454th Dental Team (Prostedontics)

Redeployed: 9
5th Evacuation Hospital
8th Convalescent Hospital
63d Field Hospital
376th Medical Company (Collecting)
449th Medical Company (Collecting)
451st Medical Company (Collecting)
566th Medical Company (Ambulance)
625th Medical Company (Clearing)
634th Medical Company (Clearing)

Alerted for redeployment: 3
HHD, 241st Medical Battalion
454th Medical Company (Collecting)
956th Medical Company (Ambulance)

Inactivated in Germany: 14
1st Medical Depot Company
1st Medical Laboratory
24th Evacuation Hospital
HHD, 52d Medical Battalion
91st Medical Gas Treatment Battalion
114th Evacuation Hospital
417th Medical Company (Ambulance)
427th Medical Company (Collecting)
459th Medical Company (Collecting)
461st Medical Company (Collecting)
514th Medical Company (Clearing)
578th Medical Company (Ambulance)
620th Medical Company (Clearing)
682d Medical Company (Clearing)

Relieved from attachment to 68th Medical Group: 2
16th Station Hospital
113th Evacuation Hospital

Closed, awaiting redeployment: 1
67th Field Hospital

On 7 March 1946, the 68th Medical Group, less personnel and equipment, except for TO&E vehicles, was relieved from all previous assignments and attachments and was assigned to Headquarters, Continental Base Section, COMMZ, per Letter, United States Forces, European Theater, Subject: "Troop Assignment and Attachment List Number 9," and the group's operational mission was assumed by the 30th Medical Battalion on the same day. The group would officially be inactivated on 27 June 1946.

=== Fort George G. Meade, 1954–1965 ===
==== 1954 ====
On 27 July 1954, after 8 years in an inactive status, the 68th Medical Group was reactivated at Fort George G. Meade, Maryland. This was one of several Regular Army medical groups to be reactivated after World War II. Others activated at about the same time included the 39th Medical Group at Fort Devens, Massachusetts, the 43d Medical Group at Fort Lewis, Washington, the 30th Medical Group at Fort Benning, Georgia, the 55th Medical Group at Fort Bragg, North Carolina; and the 67th Medical Group at Fort Sam Houston, Texas.

Within two weeks of activation there were seven units attached to the group. They were:

- 3d Surgical Hospital (Mobile)(Army)
- 36th Evacuation Hospital (Semi-mobile)
- 403d Evacuation Hospital (Semi-mobile), redesignated as the 85th Evacuation Hospital
- 533d Medical Detachment (Supply)
- 575th Medical Detachment (Dental)(Prosthesis)
- 915th Surgical Hospital (Mobile)(Army)(Separate) redesignated as the 27th Surgical Hospital
- 916th Medical Company (Ambulance)(Separate) redesignated as the 888th Medical Company

At the first meeting of the group commander and attached units, he emphasized that the mission of the group headquarters was to provide command, control, staff planning and administration for attached medical units. He stressed that unit integrity would be maintained. During the first few months after reactivation, the shortage of personnel was one of the main problems. The group headquarters had to be partially staffed by officers of attached units. The personnel sections of attached units were consolidated in order to provide better supervision and to establish uniform procedures.

Three additional units were attached to the group in August 1954. They were:

- 498th Medical Company (Preventive Medicine)(Separate)
- 320th Medical Detachment (Preventive Medicine Services)
- 562d Medical Detachment (Preventive Medicine Services)

Training under the appropriate Army Training Plan was delayed until September due to the shortage of personnel. During this period all personnel were tested to determine their basic knowledge of medical subjects, such as Anatomy, Physiology, First Aid, and so on. Of the 457 medical soldiers tested, 61 failed to pass. A school was established utilizing instructors from the various units in an attempt to raise the proficiency of those who failed to make a satisfactory showing in the test.

From May through December 1954, the 85th Evacuation Hospital participated in on-the-job (OJT) training program at the US Army Hospital, Fort George G. Meade, Maryland. The training status of other units made it imperative that an OJT program be expanded group wide. The post headquarters directed that the group establish an organizational supply at group level. The 533d Medical Detachment (Supply) along with the Group S-4 was given this mission.

In addition to the normal training and details inherent within a group, the post levied the group's units for personnel to provide details at post level. Cooperation of the group's units and liaison between group headquarters and post headquarters resulted in satisfactory solutions to most problems.

==== 1955 ====
During the early part of 1955, group personnel completed a 13-week unit training period followed by a post cycle training program in which mandatory subjects, OJT, and make-up training were emphasized.

Special operations and missions were conducted during the summer. These consisted of:

- The 85th Evacuation Hospital provided a provisional clearing company in support of an amphibious operation "Operation Hightide."
- The 3d Surgical Hospital, the 292d Medical Detachment (FMC) and the 562d Medical Detachment (PMS) supported summer training of National Guard and United States Army Reserve units at Camp Breckinridge, Kentucky from May through September.
- The 888th Medical Company (Ambulance) supported summer training by sending one platoon to Camp Breckenridge Kentucky, one platoon to Fort Indiantown Gap Military Reservation, Pennsylvania, and kept its remaining platoon at Fort George G. Meade, Maryland, in support of the firing ranges.

The group requested that two nurses be assigned to assist with training. The request was approved, and they were assigned to the 36th Evacuation Hospital, but placed on special duty with the group headquarters in order to assist all units in the group with training in nursing subjects.

==== 1956 ====
The number of units attached to the group was reduced to five during 1956. The remaining units were:

- 3d Surgical Hospital (Mobile) (Army)
- 27th Surgical Hospital (Mobile) (Army)
- 36th Evacuation Hospital (Semi-mobile)
- 85th Evacuation Hospital (Semi-mobile)
- 888th Medical Company (Ambulance)

One of the vital missions of the group was the planning of medical support in the event of local or national emergency. Part of this plan was put into effect when the 888th Medical Company (Ambulance) was called on to assist civilian agencies in the evacuation of patients and personal effects from the site of a train wreck near Odenton, Maryland. The action of this unit contributed to the subsequent presentation of the humanitarian award to Fort George G. Meade, Maryland, by the SERTOMA Society of Washington, DC.

In the latter part of 1956, the 36th Evacuation Hospital participated in an experiment in the use of the atropine self-injection. This project involved some 400 personnel and was done at the request of the Armed Forces Committee on the Standardization of Medical Materiel.

The group presented blocks of instruction in emergency medical care to several organizations, starting with the Army Advisor Group of the Maryland National Guard in Baltimore, Maryland. Members of the group also presented a demonstration on triage teams to the Army Nurses at the Walter Reed Army Medical Center. This type of demonstration was presented several times at Fort George G. Meade and elsewhere.

==== 1957 ====
In 1957, the 85th Evacuation Hospital was detached from the group and the 57th Medical Detachment (Helicopter Ambulance), which made a unit change of station from Fort Sam Houston, Texas, was attached. The usual mission of summer support for the National Guard and Army Reserve annual active duty for training with elements of the group going to Valley Forge, Fort Indiantown Gap and Camp Breckinridge.

The group participated in Second Army's Command Post Exercise "TRAPLINE I" from 4 to 6 October. There were continued requirements for the group to present demonstrations, one of which was "Medical Service on the Periphery of a Nuclear Blast Area." This was presented for students from Walter Reed Army Institute of Research.

==== 1958 ====
During 1958, the group participated in the usual summer support mission of National Guard and Army Reserve units during the year. The 57th Medical Detachment (Helicopter Ambulance) was called upon to assist in the evacuation and supply of civilians throughout the state following a snowstorm.

The 27th Surgical Hospital (Mobile) (Army) was inactivated in March 1958, leaving only four units attached to the group.

==== 1959 ====
1959 was a routine year for the group. Some difficulties were encountered due to the rapid turnover of personnel and the lack of training. The group continued to fulfill its support mission and commitments to the post.

==== 1960 ====
In 1960, the group continued the training and normal support details. The 57th Medical Detachment (Helicopter Ambulance) was redesignated the 57th Medical Platoon (Air Ambulance). The 57th was alerted on 27 May to help in the evacuation and supply of the victims of the 1960 Valdivia earthquake in Chile. While on this mission the 57th and its five Bell UH-1 Iroquois—the first issued to an air ambulance unit—flew a total of 11,000 miles and carried over 39,000 pounds of supplies in addition to the evacuation of personnel from areas where surface transportation was impossible. This mission proved the effectiveness of this type of unit.

==== 1961 ====
In 1961, the 68th Medical Group carried out its normal assignment of support and training. In October the group was alerted for overseas movement in connection with the Berlin Crisis. The 888th Medical Company (Ambulance) received movement orders. At the same time, the 343d Medical Company (Ambulance) was activated and attached to the group as part of the general buildup that occurred during this period.

==== 1962 ====
The Cuban Missile Crisis, Operation "SWIFT STRIKE II," Operation "CHALLENGE" and Operation "HONEYMOON" marked the year as one of the most active in the history of the 68th Medical Group since its reactivation in 1954.

In March, the group deployed the aircraft of the 57th Medical Detachment (Helicopter Ambulance) to the Republic of Vietnam, followed by the detachment's personnel in early April. They would become the first air ambulance unit to arrive in Vietnam, and the last to depart in March 1973.

The first nuclear mass casualty exercise of the year was conducted in May by the 36th Evacuation Hospital. This nuclear exercise climaxed a four-day field exercise involving all of the 36th Evacuation Hospital's personnel and doctors, nurses and enlisted mobilization designees from the Walter Reed Army Medical Center.

The exercise involved five ambulances loaded with simulated casualties which were transported from a notional nuclear impact area. The simulated casualties came into the hospital's receiving and evacuation area to begin processing and treatment. The entire exercise was carried out under simulated combat conditions.

The personnel of the 68th Medical Group also proved that they could handle non-nuclear mass casualties when they joined with Kimbrough Army Hospital in staging a mass casualty exercise. This situation was a simulated bus-truck collision on the Baltimore–Washington Parkway. Personnel involved in the exercise including those from Kimbrough Army Hospital and from the 343d Medical Company (Ambulance), the 36th Evacuation Hospital, and the 3d Surgical Hospital were present on the scene to assist the medical aid teams from Kimbrough Army Hospital. The casualties were transported to the two STRAC hospitals by the 343d Medical Company ambulances, where the patients were diagnosed and sent into one of six areas to receive specialized treatment. During the exercise, the skill of the 68th's medical make-up team was called upon. Under the supervision of Major Lucille Howard, ANC and her staff from the 36th Evacuation Hospital, soldiers were made up using moulages and other means of simulation, making the exorcises more realistic.

All of the group's attached units also participated in an exercise called "Operation HONEYMOON" in conjunction with Johns Hopkins Hospital in Baltimore in June 1962. Ambulances from the 343d Medical Company were utilized for the evacuation of simulated casualties; the 68th's medical make-up team made simulated patients out of 109 children from the Villa Marie Children's Village and Immaculate Heart of Mary School Boy Scout Troop; and medical aid teams from the 3d Surgical Hospital tagged simulated casualties and administered first aid on the scene of a simulated disaster.

In August, the group headquarters and the 3d Surgical Hospital participated in Operation "SWIFT STRIKE II" which took place in North and South Carolina, involving 701,000 Army and Air Force Troops.

The 68th Medical Group deployed its headquarters at Camp Mackall, North Carolina during the exercise and served with the Friendly Blue Forces on the northern side of the Lynches River, which separated the imaginary countries of Renola and Gustasu. Siding with the aggressor forces, the 3d Surgical Hospital was stationed deep in the heart of South Carolina in the vicinity of Sumter.

Attached to the XVIII Airborne Corps Headquarters and directly under the 4th Logistical Command, the 68th Medical Group headquarters served as the control group headquarters for seven medical units. They included the 37th Medical Battalion, Fort Sam Houston, Texas, and its attached units, the 520th Medical Company (Clearing), Fort Sam Houston, the 584th Medical Company (Ambulance), Fort Bragg, North Carolina, and the 714th Preventive Medicine Company, Fort Stewart, Georgia.

Directly attached to the 68th Medical Group headquarters were the 5th Evacuation Hospital, Fort Bragg and the 32d Medical Depot, Fort Sam Houston, Texas. The 68th also maintained administrative control over the 2d Surgical Hospital although it was attached directly to the 4th Logistical Command.

The 68th Medical Group headquarters was never captured during the exercise, although one of its attached units, the 37th Medical Battalion experienced aggressor forces within a quarter of a mile of its position.

September brought another exercise in the form of "Operation CHALLENGE". Under the direction of the Army Surgeon General's office, the 36th Evacuation Hospital, aided by group headquarters and the 3d Surgical Hospital, set up the hospital and invited private industry representatives to come to Fort Meade and observe the operation of an evacuation hospital in the field. The demonstration was primarily staged to help the Army increase the mobility and compactness of units like the 36th. The one-day demonstration was attended by some 600 persons, representing some 200 industries. This exercise utilized helicopter evacuation of simulated patients to the 36th Evacuation Hospital and gave the visitors a chance not only to look at the physical aspects of the hospital but also to observe its personnel and equipment in action.

Members of the 3d Surgical Hospital also took part in a 48-hour fallout shelter test that year; the first of its kind to be initiated at Fort Meade. The 49 soldiers and the officer-in-charge remained in the shelter for two days, sustaining on C-rations and pre-stored water. The test provided the Army with valuable information as to the feasibility of a shelter of this type being used over a prolonged period of time.

During October as the Cuban situation deteriorated steadily, the 68th Medical Group increased its degree of stand-by readiness. On 28 October, personnel from the 68th Medical Group headquarters received orders to prepare to deploy to a location near Miami, Florida. The following day the 68th's headquarters flew to Miami. The unit remained near Miami at the Opa-Locka Air Station for the next five weeks and was assigned to the Peninsula Base Command.

The organization of the 68th Medical Group while deployed to Florida during the Cuban Missile Crisis was as follows:

- 12th Field Hospital, home station Fort Leonard Wood, Missouri
- 15th Field Hospital, home station Fort Sam Houston, Texas
- 47th Field Hospital, home station Fort Sam Houston, Texas
- 566th Medical Company (Ambulance), home station Fort Sam Houston, Texas
- Medical Evacuation Detachment (Bus) (Provisional)

Also attached for administrative purposes were the 3d Field Hospital and a blood bank. Two medical teams, one orthopedic and one surgical, rounded out the units assigned to the group.

In an unclassified Field Training Exercise, in which the 68th Medical Group and its attached units participated while in Florida, one of the primary missions of the 68th Medical Group was evacuation and treatment of casualties. During the exercise, emphasis was placed upon the area evacuation of casualties into the Oca-Locka Air Station. From the pick-up points, simulated casualties were further evacuated to the field hospital. Umpires during the training exorcise called the performance of the 68th Medical Group and its units "Superior."

==== 1963 ====
The following units were attached to the 68th Medical Group in 1963:

- 3d Surgical Hospital (Mobile) (Army)
- 36th Evacuation Hospital (Semi-mobile)
- 888th Medical Company (Ambulance) rejoined the group on 30 July 1963 after an assignment in Germany.
- 52d Medical Detachment (Intelligence) joined the group on 1 August 1963.

No major training problems existed in the headquarters detachment of the group, shortages of personnel throughout the attached units and the continuous daily drain of personnel for maintenance details for unit and post activities made it difficult for all units to meet the requirement for 100% attendance at all training classes. Selected personnel from all units were rotated in OJT thru Kimbrough Army Hospital for purpose of maintaining technical proficiency. Routine support and training were conducted. The Annual Army Training test was administered to Headquarters and Headquarters Detachment during the period 15-16 Hay 1963, resulting in an overall rating of excellent. The Annual General Inspection was conducted during the period 19–21 August 1963 and an excellent rating was received.

==== 1964 ====
The group's task organization in 1964 remained unchanged from that of 1963.On 1 December 1964, the 52d Medical Detachment (Intelligence) conducted a unit change of station move to Fort Bragg, North Carolina.

The units attached to the 68th Medical Group furnished support throughout CY 1964 to various units and activities at Fort George G. Meade as requested. In addition, in May, the 52d Medical Detachment participated in LOGEX 64 at Fort Lee, Virginia; and on 16 May 1964, the group participated in Armed Forces Day events at Fort Meade. During June and July, the group assisted with Summer Active Duty for training of Army Reserve Medical Units. Three cycles of Advanced Individual Training in MOS 910 were conducted by the group during CY 1964, with a total of 78 graduates. This training consisted of 8 weeks of field and classroom training with practical application at Kimbrough Army Hospital located at Fort Meade.

On 3 September 1964, the group conducted a STRAC Mobility Exercise. On 10–11 September 1964, the group participated in an unannounced Second US Army Mobility Test Exercise. The officer-in-charge of the Second US Army Inspection Team stated in his critique that the units of the group had demonstrated the highest degree of performance of all units tested at Fort Meade.

The group received satisfactory ratings from the Annual General Inspection, 17–31 August 1964, and the Second US Army Command Maintenance Inspection, 3–6 November 1964.

During October and November, all units trained in accordance with the Intensive Combat Training Program, participating in field exercises conducted by group headquarters. The training terminated with an Army Training Test conducted 17–19 November 1964, which all units successfully completed. Headquarters and Headquarters Detachment received a rating of Excellent. The 13th Field Hospital from Fort Belvoir, Virginia was attached to the group during the Army Training Test.

The priority of the activity within the group during December was directed toward preparation for providing medical support for the Presidential Inaugural Parade in January 1965.

Throughout the year, members of the group's units were sent to Kimbrough Army Hospital to receive proficiency training and to render assistance to the hospital.

==== 1965 ====
During the year, the 68th Medical Group's primary mission remained to be prepared to fulfill its STRAF mission and to train and maintain attached units in an operational readiness status required to perform their STRAF missions.

At the beginning of 1965 the following units were attached to the group. All units were in a training status:

- 36th Evacuation Hospital (Semi-mobile)
- 888th Medical Company (Ambulance)
- 3d Surgical Hospital (Mobile) (Army)

On 13 January 1965, the group set up a fixed aid station, a mobile aid station in a Metropolitan ambulance with a doctor, nurse and medic and a field ambulance for inspection by Dr. Janet G. Travell, White House Physician and other members of the Inaugural Committee for Medical Care.

The group provided medical support for the Presidential Inauguration on 20 January 1965. About 150 personnel were involved in establishing and operating 13 aid stations. Two tents were erected for use by the American Red Cross.

Group headquarters and attached units participated in exercise "PINE TREE II" at Camp A.P. Hill, Virginia, from 15–19 March 1965. This exercise was a combined Field Training Exercise and Command Post Exercise under the direction the 2d Logistical Command, Fort Lee, Virginia.

The group provided one officer to serve as a senior medical controller for the Second Army Exercise "BEAR TRAP."

The group presented a course in emergency medical care for instructor personnel from non-medical units at Fort Meade from 8–12 March 1965.

On 3 August 1965, the 3d Surgical Hospital (Mobile) (Army) was relieved from attachment to the group and deployed to the Republic of Vietnam. From 22–25 September 1965, the group and attached units were given a mobility test by Second United States Army, with excellent results.

On 27 October 1965, Headquarters and Headquarters Detachment, 68th Medical Group was alerted for movement to the Republic of Vietnam. Personnel Readiness Date vas established as 5 January 1966. Equipment Readiness Date was established as 15 December 1965.

On 15 November 1965, the 36th Evacuation Hospital (Semi-mobile) and the 888th Medical Company (Ambulance) were relieved from attachment to the group and attached to Fort George G. Meade, Maryland, to relieve the group headquarters of all attached units prior to deploying overseas.

Actual movement of the 68th Medical Group was not made until 1966.

=== Vietnam ===
==== 1966 ====
On 17 January 1966, the advance party of Headquarters, 68th Medical Group departed Fort George G. Meade, Maryland, arriving in the Republic of Vietnam on 21 January 1966. The main body arrived on 6 February 1966 and proceeded to its permanent site at Long Binh. Following a period of construction, largely on a self-help basis, the unit became operational on 1 March 1966, under the direct control of Headquarters, 1st Logistical Command. At this time the headquarters assumed command, control, and administrative functions for thirty-eight subordinate units.

The operational mission of the 68th Medical Group was to provide a combination of Field Army level and Communication Zone level medical service in the III and IV Corps Tactical Zones (Republic of Vietnam military boundaries) to US and Free World Military Assistance Forces.

Under direct control of Headquarters, 68th Medical Group, were placed the following major units:

- HHD, 58th Medical Battalion
- 4th Medical Detachment (JA)
- 932d Medical Detachment (AI)
- 20th Preventive Medicine Unit (Service)(Field)
- 3d Field Hospital
- 3d Surgical Hospital (Mobile) (Army)
- Medical Company (Air Ambulance) (Provisional)
  - 436th Medical Detachment (AI) (Company Headquarters)
  - 57th Medical Detachment (Helicopter Ambulance)
  - 82d Medical Detachment (Helicopter Ambulance)
  - 254th Medical Detachment (Helicopter Ambulance)
  - 283d Medical Detachment (Helicopter Ambulance)
- 345th Medical Detachment (MA)
- 93d Evacuation Hospital (Semi-mobile)

The Medical Company (Air Ambulance) (Provisional), also sometimes referred to as the 436th Medical Company (Air Ambulance) (Provisional), assumed its air ambulance mission on 15 September 1966 and relinquished it in 1967 when the 45th Medical Company (Air Ambulance) arrived and assumed its mission.

The remaining twenty-nine companies and teams were subordinate to these principal units. Seven days later, on 7 March 1966, the 36th Evacuation Hospital was placed under 68th Medical Group operational control.

On 31 March 1966, the 68th Medical Group was relieved from its assignment to the 1st Logistical Command and was assigned to the Medical Brigade (Provisional), a construct of the 44th Medical Brigade's advance party and the 1st Logistical Command Surgeon's Office. On 1 April 1966, the 17th Field Hospital became operational and was assigned to the 68th Medical Group. Also on 1 April, the 4th Medical Detachment (JA), 20th Preventive Medicine Unit (Service)(Field), and the 932d Medical Detachment (AI) were all reassigned to the Medical Brigade (Provisional), reducing the group's span of control.

On 19 May 1966, the 53d Medical Detachment (KA) and the 61st Medical Detachment (MB) were assigned, followed on 3 June by the 629th Medical Detachment (KP). On 4 June 1966, six more organizations were assigned to the 68th Medical Group. They were the 7th Surgical Hospital (Mobile) (Army), Headquarters, 74th Medical Battalion, 50th Medical Company (Clearing), and the 332d, 541st, and the 346th Medical Dispensaries. Six days later, on 10 June 1966, the 24th Evacuation Hospital was assigned, followed on 24 June by the 104th Medical Detachment (KD). On 10 July the 45th Medical Detachment (KD) arrived. By 31 July 1966, 1605 operating beds were available.

More units were assigned on 1 September 1966, with the arrival of the 436th Medical Detachment (AC), which replaced the provisional air ambulance company headquarters, and the 439th Medical Detachment (RE). On 7 September 1966, the 872d Medical Detachment (RB) was assigned, followed the next day by the 229th Medical Detachment (MC). On 18 September, the 12th Evacuation Hospital was assigned.

3 October 1966 saw the assignment of the 45th Surgical Hospital (Mobile) (Army) to the 68th Medical Group. The 45th Surgical Hospital was the first deployed to an active theater of operations with MUST (Medical Unit, Self-contained, Transportable) equipment. On 15 October the 584th Medical Company (Ambulance) was assigned, as was the 133d Medical Detachment (OA) on 28 November 1966.

During 1966, the following operations were provided medical support by units within the 68th Medical Group:

- Toledo
- Blue Jay
- Wren
- Sunset Beach
- Yorktown
- Robin
- Stable
- Oahu
- Atlantic City
- Baton Rouge
- El Paso
- Canary
- Silver Lake
- Deckhouse 5
- Kipapa
- Cedar Falls
- Battle Creek/Attleboro
- Albany
- Duluth
- Gadsden
- Garden City
- Jeb Stuart
- MDMAF
- North Carolina

During the latter months of 1966, a self-help construction program was undertaken by Headquarters, 68th Medical Group. Without decreasing efforts in pursuit of the mission, headquarters personnel procured building materials and constructed billets of wood, screening, and corrugated sheet metal. By mid-November, all personnel had moved out of tents and into those semi-permanent structures. With engineer support, a permanent headquarters building was completed in September 1966. This is a U-shaped building composed of three large rooms with a total floor space of 6,000 square feet.

Throughout 1966, elements provided support to tactical operations throughout the III and V Corps RVN Tactical Zones. By the end of the year, the 68th Medical Group's forty-six subordinate units made it the largest medical group in Vietnam, providing 1,867 patient beds. This number accounted for more than half of all operating beds within the 44th Medical Brigade

The 50th Medical Company (Clearing) had a change of mission in 1966. Originally established as an overflow and holding facility in support of the 24th Evacuation Hospital, the 50th became a centralized treatment facility for Viet Cong Prisoners and detainees. It also provided two wards for treatment of US Stockade prisoners in the Long Binh Jail.

Problem areas noted during 1966 revolved around communications, electric power, construction materials, and ground ambulance evacuation. Communications were inadequate because of the overwhelming amount of telephone traffic, and because of limitations in the capabilities of authorized radios. Critica1 shortages of electric generators were gradually overcome, and by the end of the year most units had adequate power sources. Ground ambulances evacuation was virtually nonexistent except for traffic on highway 15 between Long Binh and Binh Hoa. The lack of road security placed the burden of most evacuation on air ambulances.

==== 1967 ====
The primary mission of the 68th Medical Group during 1967 was command, control and staff supervision of assigned or attached medical units located or operating within the III and IV Corps Tactical Zones, Republic of Vietnam. On 23 October 1967 the original III and IV Corps areas of responsibility of the 68th Medical Group was reduced to that portion of III Corps Tactical Zone within the Tactical Area of Operational Interest of the 1st and 9th Infantry Divisions, 101st Airborne Division (Airmobile), 199th Light Infantry Brigade (Separate), 1st Australian Task Force, Royal Thai Volunteer Regiment, and the 11th Armored Cavalry Regiment. The 67th Medical Group became operational at that time and Assumed responsibility of the other portion of the III CTZ and the IV CTZ.

Of the forty-six units assigned to the 68th Medical Group on 1 January 1967, twenty eight assigned and two attached remained as of 31 December 1967. This reduction was due to the division of the 68th Medical Group area of responsibility and medical resources between the 67th and 68th Medical Groups. During the period 1 January thru 22 October 1967 the 68th Medical Group area of responsibility was nearly double the size of any other medical group in Vietnam. Following the reduction, the 68th Medical Group remained the largest in the country with three evacuation hospitals, three surgical hospitals, one medical company (Air Ambulance), one medical battalion and numerous small medical units assigned or attached. The area of responsibility at the end of 1967 encompassed 23,000 square miles ranging from Dang Hoa in the South to Bu Giao to the North.

Organizational changes during CY 1967 were as follows:

Unit	Date assigned	Remarks
58th Medical Battalion	1 March 1966	First medical command and control HQs deployed to Vietnam. 10 October 1967 received units previously attached to 74th Medical Battalion. 74th reassigned to 55th Medical Group for utilization in I CTZ
*3d Field Hospital (Saigon & Tan Son Nhut)	1 March 1966	23 October 1967 - Reassigned to 67th Medical Group
3d Surgical Hospital	1 March 1966	a. 1 May 67 - Moved from Bien Hoa to Dong Tam (IV CTZ). First hospital in delta.
		b. 23 Oct 67 - Reassigned to 67th Medical Group
93d Evacuation Hospital (Long Binh Post)	1 March 1966	Provided medical support to U.S. and Free World Military Assistance Forces in III CTZ
*17th Field Hospital (Saigon)	10 March 1966	23 October 1967 - Reassigned to 67th Medical Group
*155th Medical Detachment (KF) (3d Field Hospital) (Saigon & Tan Son Nhut)	1 March 1966	23 October 1967 - Reassigned to 67th Medical Group
*62d Medical Detachment (KA) (3d Field Hospital) (Saigon & Tan Son Nhut)	1 March 1966	23 October 1967 - Reassigned to 67th Medical Group
*5lst Field Hospital (3d Field Hospital) (Saigon & Tan Son Nhut)	1 March 1966	Augmentation to 3d Field Hospital
*915th Medical Detachment (KH) (Chu Lai) (I CTZ)	1 March 1966	1 May 1967 - Reassigned to 55th Medical Group in support of Task Force Oregon (Americal Division augmenting x-ray capability
46th Medical Detachment (KB) (24th Evacuation Hospital) (Long Binh Post)	1 March 1966	Attached to the 24th Evacuation Hospital
*254th Medical Detachment (RA) (Nha Trang II CTZ South)	1 March 1966	6 August 67 - Reassigned to 43d Medical Group to support aeromedical evacuation in II CTZ South
283d Medical Detachment (RA) (Pleiku II CTZ North)	1 March 1966	10 September 1967 - Reassigned to 55th Medical Group to support aeromedical evacuation in II CTZ North
82d Medical Detachment (RA) (Soc Trang)	1 March 1966	a. 23 October 1967 - Reassigned to 67th Medical Group
		b. Supports aeromedical evacuation in IV CTZ
*616th Medical Company (Clearing) (An Khe II CTZ North)	1 March 1966	a. 1 May 67 - HQ and two platoons deployed to An Khe, assigned to 55th Medical Group
		b. 10 September 1967 - 1st Platoon originally operating a clearing facility at Phu Loi, joined rest of company in II CTZ North
#36th Evacuation Hospital (Vung Tau)	10 March 1966	Provides medical support to U.S. and Free World Military Assistance Forces in III CTZ. Had 100 beds to support Civilian War Casualties Program
*561st Medical Company (Ambulance) #(Long Binh)	18 March 1966	23 October 67 - Reassigned to 67th Medical Group
*436th Medical Company (Air Ambulance)	1 September 1966	Redesignated 658th Medical Detachment (Company HQ), (Team AG) 6 June 1967, Command Headquarters for four RA air ambulance detachments
#53d Medical Detachment (KA) (Long Binh)	1 May 1966	23 August 1967 - Attached to 93d Evacuation Hospital
935th Medical Detachment (KO)	1 May 1966	23 August 1967 - Attached to 93d Evacuation Hospital
*945th Medical Detachment (KA) #(Chu Lai I CTZ)	1 March 1966	1 May 1967 - Reassigned to 55th Medical Group in support of Task Force Oregon (Americal Division)
#7th Surgical Hospital (Long Giao)	4 June 1966	1 April 1967 - Moved from Cu Chi Base Camp, 25th Infantry Division, to Long Giao (Blackhorse) Base Camp, 11th Armored Cavalry Regiment
*74th Medical Battalion (Chu Lai I CTZ)	4 June 1966	1 October 1967 - Reassigned to 55th Medical Group in support of Task Force Oregon (Americal Division)
#50th Medical Company (Clearing)	4 June 1966	a. III and IV GTZ US POW medical facility
		b. 16 Nov 67 - 3d Platoon deployed to Phu Loi operating 40 bed clearing facility
*104th Medical Detachment (KD) (24th Evacuation Hospital) (Long Binh Post)	24 June 1966	23 Aug 67 - Reattached from 3d Field Hospital to 24th Evacuation Hospital
*629th Medical Detachment (Renal) #(3d Field Hosp) (Saigon & Tan Son Nhut)	24 June 1966	23 October 1967 - Reassigned to 67th Medical Group
#24th Evacuation Hospital	28 June 1966	III and IV CTZ - Neurosurgical Center
#202d Medical Detachment (MA) (Long Binh-TC Hill)	5 July 1966	23 August 1967 - Relocated from Tan Son Nhut to Long Binh (TC Hill)
2d Medical Detachment (MA)	5 July 1966	10 July 1967 - Relocated from Rice Mill area, Saigon to 90th Replacement Battalion, Long Binh Post
#332d (MB) (Long Binh Post, USARV HQ)	5 July 1966	10 October 1967 - Attached to 58th Medical Battalion from 74th Medical Battalion
#25th Medical Detachment (MA) (Long Binh Post)	5 July 1966	10 October 1967 - Attached to 58th Medical Battalion from 74th Medical Battalion
*346th Medical Detachment (MA) #(Can Tho-IV CTZ)	5 July 1966	23 October 1967 - Reassigned to 67th Medical Group
#54lst Medical Detachment (OA) (Long Binh Post-Tanker Valley)	5 July 1966	10 October 1967 - Attached to 58th Medical Battalion from 74th Medical Battalion
#673d Medical Detachment (OA) (Saigon Port)	5 July 1966	1 Apr 67 - Reattached from 7th Surgical Hospital (Cu Chi) to 24th Evacuation Hospital (Long Binh Post)
#45th Medical Detachment (KB) (24th Evacuation Hospital, Long Binh Post)	11 July 1966	23 August 1967 - Attached to the 36th Evacuation Hospital
#345th Medical Detachment (MA) (36th Evacuation Hospital) (Vung Tau)	11 July 1966	23 August 1967 - Attached to the 36th Evacuation Hospital
#439th Medical Detachment (RB) (Bus Ambulance) (Long Binh Base)	11 January 1966	23 August 1967 - Attached to the 58th Medical Battalion
#872d Medical Detachment (RB) (Bus Ambulance) (36th Evacuation Hospital) (Vung Tau)	7 September 1966	23 August 1967 - Attached to the 36th Evacuation Hospital
*12th Evacuation Hospital #(Cu Chi)	18 September 1966	23 October 1967 - Reassigned to 67th Medical Group
*229th Med Det (MC) (Tan Son Nhut)	8 September 1966	23 August 1967 - Relocated from 90th Replacement Battalion, Long Binh, to Tan Son Nhut
*45th Surgical Hospital (MUST) (Tay Ninh)	30 October 1966	a. First MUST Hospital in country
		b. 23 October 1967 - Reassigned to 67th Medical Group
#61st Medical Detachment (MA) (Long Binh Post)	7 October 1966	10 October 1967 - Attached to the 58th Medical Battalion from the 74th Medical Battalion
#584th Medical Company (Ambulance) (Long Binh Post)	15 October 1966	23 August 1967 - Attached to the 58th Medical Battalion
*584th Medical Company (Ambulance) (Bien Hoa Air Force Base)	15 October 1966	10 October 1967 - Attached to the 58th Medical Battalion from the 74th Medical Battalion
*133d Medical Detachment (OA) #(Cat Lai III CTZ)	12 December 1966	23 October 67 - Reassigned to 67th Medical Group
#498th Medical Detachment (RB) (Bus Ambulance) (Long Binh Base)	2 February 1967	23 August 1967 - Attached to the 58th Medical Battalion
#500th Medical Detachment (RB) (Ambulance) (Long Binh Post)	14 March 1967	23 August 1967 - Attached to the 58th Medical Battalion
#45th Medical Company (Air Ambulance) (Long Binh Post)	10 August 1967	1 December 1967 - 4th Flight Platoon moved to Lai Khe
#436th Medical Detachment (Company Headquarters) (Team AC) (Long Binh Post)	14 September 1967	Disbanded as the 436th Medical Company (Air Ambulance (Provisional)
*658th Medical Detachment (Team AC) (Long Binh Post)	1 June 1967	a. 1 June 1967 - 436th Medical Detachment redesignated 658th
		b. 31 July 1967 - Reduced to zero strength; replaced by 45th Medical Company (Air Ambulance)
		c. 5 October 1967 - Reassigned to the 44th Medical Brigade
#18th Surgical Hospital (MUST) (Lai Khe)	17 November 1967	a. Assigned from 55th Medical Group
		b. 15 December 1967 - Moved to Lai Khe
		C. 1 January 1968 - Became operational
#161st Medical Detachment (OA)	28 December 1967	a. Assigned from 43d Medical Group
		b. Attached to the 93d Evacuation Hospital
Attachments		
1st Platoon, 32d Medical Depot (Long Binh Post)	28 June 1967	Attached for rations, quarters, administrative support, and physical security
946th Medical Laboratory (Mobile) (Long Binh Post)	1 August 1967	Attached for rations and quarters
Staged Units		
*HHD, 67th Medical Group #(Bien Hoa)	23 September 1967	Arrived in-country; assigned to 44th Medical Brigade
*159th Medical Detachment (RA) #(Cu Chi)	17 October 1967	23 October 1967 - Assigned to 67th Medical Group
#22d Surgical Hospital (MUST) (Long Binh Post)	27 December 1967	a. Undergoing MUST training
		b. Operational site not assigned

- * Not assigned to the 68th Medical Group at the end of 1967
- # Units staged in-country or into operational area by 68th Medical Group

Complete personnel services were provided on a group-wide basis during 1967. In February, the group's personnel office was disbanded, and its functions were assumed by Team D of the 222d Personnel Services Company. Records of all outlying subordinate organizations were consolidated, providing a total of approximately 3200 records which were centrally maintained. With the transfer of units to the 67th Medical Group and the arrival of additional units to the 68th Medical Group the number of personnel records maintained within the 68th Medical Group was reduced to approximately 2000 by 31 December 1967. Finance records of the 36th Evacuation Hospital (Vung Tau), 7th Surgical Hospital (Long Giao), 12th Evacuation Hospital (Cu Chi), 17th Field Hospital (Saigon) and several outlying dispensaries were maintained by finance elements at their locations. This arrangement provided closer and more responsive finance support to individual members of the serviced units.

Large rotational humps within subordinate units were largely resolved during August and September 1967. Each organization was reviewed by military occupational specialty (MOS) (officer and enlisted), and by rotation date within MOS. Wherever large numbers of rotating personnel reflected a hump during any month, reassignments were scheduled to units which had a low number of personnel rotating during that month. Reassigned personnel were replaced from other units having humps during the other months, so that no significant strength reductions were experienced by any unit. At the end of 1967, only the 45th Medical Company (Air Ambulance) possessed a serious rotational problem stemming from its recent arrival in country. Since the bulk of personnel in that unit are flight qualified, and no other aviation unit was assigned to the 68th Medical Group, plans for reassignment were coordinated with the 44th Medical Brigade. Thus, through a gradual phasing process, individuals would be reassigned to and replaced from other medical aviation units in such fashion as to greatly minimize the rotational hump within the 45th Medical Company (AA).

Elements of the 68th Medical Group provided all facets of medical support to t he following units and organizations:

- 1st Infantry Division
- 3d Brigade, 4th Infantry Division (Redesignated 3d Brigade, 25th Infantry Division)
- 25th Infantry Division
- 196th Light Infantry Brigade (Prior to its deployment to II Corp Area)
- 199th Light Infantry Brigade
- 101st Airborne Division
- 173d Airborne Brigade (Prior to its deployment to II Corp Area)
- 11th Armored Cavalry Regiment
- Royal Thai Volunteer Regiment
- 43d, 55th, and 67th Medical Groups
- Other Free World Military Assistance Forces
- Army of the Republic of Vietnam
- Units without organic medical support, on an area basis

Movement of subordinate elements during 1967 are indicated below:

Date	From	To	Unit	Remarks
28 January 1967	Saigon	Long Binh Base	1st Platoon, 32d Medical Depot	Provides supplies & medical support for III & IV CTZs
1 April 1967	Cu Chi (III CTZ)	Long Gaio (III CTZ)	7th Surgical Hospital	Supports Long Gaio Base Camp
1 April 1967	Cu Chi (III CTZ)	Long Binh Base (III CTZ)	45th Medical Detachment (KB)	Attached to 24th Evacuation Hospital
1 May 1967	Long Binh Base (III CTZ)	Phu Loi (III CTZ)	1st Platoon, 616th Medical Company (Clearing)	Support to 1st Infantry Division
1 May 1967	Bien Hoa (III CTZ)	Dong Tam (IV CTZ)	3d Surgical Hospital	a. Was MUST equipped upon move
				b. Hospital to assume operations in the delta area
1 May 1967	Long Binh Base (III CTZ)	An Khe (II CTZ North)	616th Medical Company (Clearing) (-)	HQ and 2 platoons support to operations in II CTZ
1 May 1967	Saigon (III CTZ)	Chu Lai (I CTZ)	915th Medical Detachment (KH)	Support to Task Force Oregon
1 May 1967	Long Binh Base (III CTZ)	Chu Lai (I CTZ)	945th Medical Detachment (KA)	Support to Task Force Oregon
25 May 1967	Bien Hoa (III CTZ)	Bien Hoa (III CTZ)	84th Medical Detachment (OA)	Relocation of Dispensary
10 July 1967	Rice Mill, Saigon (III CTZ)	Long Binh Base (III CTZ)	2d Medical Detachment (MA)	Supports 90th Replacement Battalion
6 August 1967	Long Binh Base (III CTZ)	Nha Trang (II CTZ)	254th Medical Detachment (RA)	Supports 55th Medical Group
23 August 1967	Saigon (III CTZ)	Long Binh Base (III CTZ)	104th Medical Detachment (KD)	Attached to 24th Evacuation Hospital
23 August 1967	Tan Son Nhut (III CTZ)	Long Binh Base (III CTZ)	202d Medical Detachment (MA)	Provides Support for 24th Transportation Company
23 August 1967	Long Binh Base (III CTZ)	Tan Son Nhut (III CTZ)	229th Medical Detachment (MC)	Supports MACV Headquarters
10 September 1967	Long Binh Base (III CTZ)	Pleiku (II CTZ North)	283d Medical Detachment (RA)	Supports 55th Medical Group
19 September 1967	Phu Loi (III CTZ)	An Khe (II CTZ North)	1st Platoon, 616th Medical Company (Clearing)	Rejoined rest of company
1 October 1967	Long Binh Base (III CTZ)	Chu Lai (I CTZ)	74th Medical Battalion	Support to Task Force Oregon (Americal Division)
1 November 1967	Long Binh Base (III CTZ)	Phu Loi (III CTZ)	2d Platoon, 50th Medical Company (Clearing)	Supports Phu Loi Base Camp
1 December 1967	Long Binh Base (III CTZ)	Lai Khe (III CTZ)	18th Surgical Hospital	Supports Lai Khe Base Camp and the 1st Infantry Division

During 1967, evacuation procedures and evacuation capabilities of the 68th Medical Group were markedly improved. At the end of 1966, four air ambulance detachments and twenty-four helicopters were available for the aeromedical evacuation of patients from III and IV Corps Tactical Zones. With the arrival of the 45th Medical Company (Air Ambulance) in late July, two of the detachments were deployed to other tactical zones. The 45th Medical Company (AA) deployed to Vietnam at full strength, the only "G" series Table of Organization and Equipment unit assigned to the 68th Medical Group. With 25 organic helicopters, the 45th provides evacuation support to the group's area of operations. The assigned helicopters were modified UH-1Ds equipped with the L-13, higher horsepower engines, later redesignated as the UH-1H. Operational missions during 1967 involved aeromedical support of the Long Binh area, tactical support of a divisional or similar area with field standbys and preplanned tactical support of Battalion or larger sized unit operation.

Following changes in support areas during the year, by year end the 67th Medical Group was only supporting only in the III CTZ.

When the 67th Medical Group became operational on 23 October 1967 they were given responsibility for the entire IV Corps area and a portion of the III Corps area. As with air ambulance support, the 68th Medical Group had less area to support with ground ambulances and therefore was able to provide better service. One ambulance company and three bus ambulance detachments supported the ground evacuation mission. More than 36,000 patients were provided ground transportation during 1967.

Large haul aircraft from both Army and Air Force resources were used extensively in support of patient evacuation from field locations, between hospitals, and from hospital to aerial ports of embarkation, particularly to Air Force casualty staging facilities.

Army Chinook (CH-47) helicopters provided remote field location pickups when the casualty loads were such that the situation was beyond the resources of aeromedical evacuation helicopters. For example, during OPERATION JUNCTION CITY, (a multi-division operation in northern III Corps Tactical Zone) Chinooks were used on many occasions to evacuate clearing and battalion aid stations. At times, even the field sites were cleared of the less severely wounded when the expenditure of men and aircraft could be materially reduced.

Air Force C-123 and C-130 aircraft were extensively used between hospitals of the group, between medical groups and on those occasions when the number of patients to be moved and/or the distance involved dictated use of the larger fixed wing aircraft.

The staging of patients for inter-group and out-of-country movement was coordinated with USAF elements, the 21st Casualty Staging Flight and the 903d Aeromedical Evacuation Squadron. One or both were called upon to support the group on nearly a daily basis.

Aircraft were not the only resource available for the movement of large numbers of patients. The two assigned 44-passenger bus ambulance detachments (the 498th and 500th Medical Detachments (RB)) moved more patients during any given period than the combined use of other large haul vehicles. Busses were used for routine movements between division base camps, hospitals, dispensaries and transient personnel facilities. Some 34,383 patients and personnel were moved by this method during 1967. These busses were also used for movement of patients to aerial ports and casualty staging facilities of the U.S. Air Force. Limited only by the patients' conditions, tactical situation, security of the areas through which the vehicles passed, and the serviceability of the road nets, the bus ambulance proved itself to be a highly useful addition to the medical evacuation vehicle fleet.

The steady flow of patients into medical treatment facilities was a function of the medical regulator. He relied primarily on radio, particularly FM tactical radios. The 68th Medical Group operated a medical regulating patient evacuation radio net twenty four hours per day. Two FM transmitters and two FM separate receivers facilitated coordination with tactical elements, aeromedical helicopters, other helicopters evacuating patients, air force aircraft, hospital receiving areas, and control personnel accompanying patients moved by ground ambulances.

The established routine of patient evacuation within the 68th Medical Group area of responsibility followed a general pattern. Personnel at field sites where wounded patients were relayed requests for aeromedical evacuation via radio, generally, through tactical medical channels either to a field stand-by helicopter or to the air ambulance company. A helicopter was dispatched to the field location. Immediately following pick-up, the evacuation helicopter pilot established contact with the group medical regulator, providing essential information on the patient's condition, whether litter or ambulatory, and other data that was available. With this information the medical regulator determined the nearest facility that could provide the care required.

During 1967, 53,096 patients had been admitted to 68th Medical Group facilities. Patients admitted ranged from those with traumatic amputations, extremity wounds, burns, sprains, fractures, and other more serious and war related injuries to malaria, hepatitis, intestinal disorders, and other medical conditions. Patients requiring periods of a rather long convalescence were evacuated to the 6th Convalescent Center, 43d Medical Group, to Pacific Area Command hospitals or to medical facilities located within the continental United States.

The Civilian War Casualty Program, designed to provide medical care for war injuries and war related injuries of Republic of Vietnam civilians, began in 1967. The program initially envisioned that the United States would construct hospital facilities in those areas where medical care, particularly hospitalization, was either non-existent or where the resources of the Minister of Health were inadequate. These facilities had not been constructed as of the end of 1967. As an interim measure, the 36th Evacuation Hospital, Vung Tau, was designated, from existing 68th Medical Group resources, as the facility to provide one-hundred beds in support of the Civilian War Casualty program in III and IV Corps Tactical Zones.

The Civilian War Casualty Program was envisioned to be a referral system, where the Republic of Vietnam Minister of Health, through the U.S. Agency for International Development, would select certain cases, currently hospitalized in host nation facilities, to be moved to the 36th Evacuation Hospital for further, more definitive medical care. By the end of 1967, no patients had been referred to the 36th for specialty care.

Prisoners of War and detained personnel were of particular concern. All hospitals treated Viet Cong, North Vietnamese, war and detained personnel as required. To facilitate the interrogation of prisoners and to expedite processing, the 24th Evacuation Hospital was designated to provide acute in-patient hospital care and the 50th Medical Company (Clearing) convalescent medical care for POWs and detainees in the US chain of evacuation in the III and IV Corps Tactical Zones. The proximity of both facilities to the ARVN POW facility, II Field Force Vietnam and USARV and MACV headquarters further enhanced the treatment phase of the patient's processing. Patients requiring long term hospitalization were routinely moved to an ARVN medical treatment facility as soon as practical.

==== 1968 ====
The primary mission of the 68th Medical Group during 1968 was command, control and staff supervision of assigned or attached medical units located or operating within the III and IV Corps Tactical Zones.

During 1968 the 68th Medical Group provided field army level medical service for the III and IV Corps Tactical Zones, or about 40% of the entire land mass of South Vietnam and 62% of the total authorized Army level hospital beds. Major tactical units Supported in the III and IV Corps Tactical Zones were: the 1st, 9th, and 25th Infantry Divisions, 101st Airborne Division (Airmobile) (Rear), 199th Light Infantry Brigade (Separate), 11th Armored Cavalry Regiment, 1st Australian Task Force, the Royal Thai Volunteer Regiment, 5th, 7th, 9th, 18th, 21st and 25th Divisions (ARVN), the 3d Brigade of the 82d Airborne Division, and the 1st Cavalry Division (Airmobile).

Fifty-one units were assigned to the 68th Medical Group as of 31 December 1968. During 1968 the 68th Medical Group area of responsibility was nearly double the size of any of the other medical groups in Vietnam. The 68th Medical Group remained the largest in the country with five evacuation hospitals, four surgical hospitals, three field hospitals, one medical battalion, one medical company (air ambulance) and four medical detachments (RA), one medical company (clearing), two ground ambulance companies, and numerous small medical units. The area of responsibility at the end of 1968 encompassed approximately 30,000 square miles ranging from the southern tip of the Mekong Delta region to Song Be, a distance of 240 miles.

Organizational changes during 1968 were as follows:

Unit	Date assigned	Remarks
22d Surgical Hospital	27 December 1967	Reassigned to the 67th Medical Group on 30 January 1968
12th Evacuation Hospital	16 February 1968	Relieved from 67th Medical Group, stationed at Cu Chi
3rd Field Hospital	16 February 1968	Relieved from 67th Medical Group, stationed at Saigon, Tan Son Nhut
3d Surgical Hospital	16 February 1968	Relieved from 67th Medical Group, stationed at Dong Tam
17th Field Hospital	16 February 1968	Relieved from 67th Medical Group, stationed at An Khe
		Relieved from the 68th Medical Group 29 March 1968 and reassigned to the 55th Medical Group at An Khe
45th Surgical Hospital	16 February 1968	Relieved from 67th Medical Group, stationed at Tay Ninh
82d Medical Detachment (RA)	16 February 1968	Relieved from 67th Medical Group, stationed at Soc Trang. Attached to 45th Medical Company (AA)
57th Medical Detachment (RA)	16 February 1968	Relieved from 67th Medical Group, stationed at Long Binh Post. Attached to 45th Medical Company (AA)
500th Medical Detachment (RB)	16 February 1968	Relieved from 67th Medical Group, stationed at Quang Tri City
		Relieved from 68th Medical Group and reassigned to the 55th Medical Group 5 March 1968, stationed at Quang Tri City
561st Medical Company (Ambulance)	16 February 1968	Relieved from 67th Medical Group, stationed at Long Binh Post
84th Medical Detachment (OA)	16 February 1968	Relieved from 67th Medical Group, attached to 58th Medical Battalion
133d Medical Detachment (OA)	16 February 1968	Relieved from 67th Medical Group, attached to 58th Medical Battalion
229th Medical Detachment (MC)	16 February 1968	Relieved from the 67th Medical Group, attached to the 3d Field Hospital
346th Medical Detachment (MA)	16 February 1968	Relieved from the 67th Medical Group
		Attached to the 29 Evacuation Hospital 18 September 1968
51st Field Hospital	16 February 1968	Relieved from the 67th Medical Group, augments the 3d Field Hospital
62d Medical Detachment (MB)	16 February 1968	Relieved from the 67th Medical Group, attached to the 3d Field Hospital
155th Medical Detachment (KF)	16 February 1968	Relieved from the 67th Medical Group, attached to the 3d Field Hospital
629th Medical Detachment (KP)	16 February 1968	Relieved from the 67th Medical Group, attached to the 3d Field Hospital
667th Medical Detachment (AC)	16 February 1968	Relieved from the 67th Medical Group, atationed at Bien Hoa and assigned to the 68th Medical Group stationed at Long Binh Post
159th Medical Detachment (RA)	16 February 1968	Relieved from the 67th Medical Group, attached to the 45th Medical Company (AA)
18th Surgical Hospital	16 November 1967	Reassigned to the 67th Medical Group on 11 March 1968
29th Evacuation Hospital	21 May 1968	Arrived in-country 22 May 1968
		Became operational 14 August 1968
		First evacuation hospital in the IV Corps TActical Zone. Furthest south of any U.S. Army hospital in Vietnam
74th Field Hospital		Mobilized USAR unit arrived in the Republic of Vietnam 14 September 1968
		Became operational 14 October 1968
		Provides PW and detainee care for II and IV Corps Tactical Zones
247th Medical Detachment (RA)	10 October 1968	Attached to the 45th Medical Company (AA)
		Arrived in the Republic of Vietnam 21 December 1968. Stationed at Dong Tam
		Became operational 23 December 1968
2d Surgical Hospital	7 December 1968	Relieved from the 67th Medical Group, stationed at Lai Khe
22d Surgical Hospital	27 December 1968	Reassigned to the 67th Medical Group, 20 January 1969

Unit moves during 1968 were as follows:

Unit	Date	Moved from	Moved to	Remarks
161st Medical Detachment (OA)	1 February 1968	Long Binh Post	Da Nang	Reassigned to the 55th Medical Group
1st Flight Platoon, 45th Medical Company (AA)	16 February 1968	Long Binh Post	Vung Tau	Relocated to Vung Tau as a standby to increase the effectiveness of evacuation
4th Flight Platoon, 45th Medical Company (AA)	16 February 1968	Long Binh Post	Lai Khe	Relocated to Lai Khe as a standby to increase the effectiveness of evacuation
667th Medical Detachment (AC)	20 February 1968	Bien Hoa	Long Binh Post	Augments the 68th Medical Group Headquarters Detachment
500th Medical Detachment (RB)	5 March 1968	Saigon	Quang Tri City	Reassigned to the 67th Medical Group
18th Surgical Hospital	11 March 1968	Long Binh Post	Quang Tri City	Reassigned to the 67th Medical Group
17th Field Hospital	29 March 1968	Saigon	An Khe	Reassigned to the 67th Medical Group
1st Platoon, 561st Medical Company (Ambulance)	15 April 1968	Long Binh Post	Tan Son Nhut	Relocated in the Saigon/Tan Son Nhut area to provide better ground ambulance support to the 3d Field Hospital and attached medical treatment facilities
1st Platoon, 50th Medical Company (Clearing)	26 May 1968	Phu Loi	Phuc Vinh	Relocated to Phuc Vinh in support of the 1st Cavalry Division (Airmobile)
25th Medical Detachment (OA)	20 June 1968	Long Binh Post	Bien Hoa	Relocation of dispensary
43d Medical Detachment (RB)	1 July 1968	Long Binh Post	Can Tho	Relocated to Can Tho in support of the 29th Evacuation Hospital
HHD, 2d & 3d Platoons, 50th Medical Company (Clearing)	29 August 1968	Long Binh Post	Bearcat	Relocated to Bearcat
84th Medical Detachment (OA)	12 September 1968	Bien Hoa	Phu Lam	Relocation of dispensary
4th Platoon, 50th Medical Company (Clearing)	19 October 1968	Long Binh Post	Bearcat	Joined parent company at Bearcat
2d Surgical Hospital	7 December 1968	Chu Lai	Lai Khe	To support 1st Infantry Division and Lai Khe complex

During 1968, evacuation procedures and evacuation capabilities of the 68th Medical Group continued to improve. Initially, one air ambulance company and one ground ambulance company were available for the evacuation of patients from the portion of the III Corps Tactical Zone that fell under the 68th Medical Group area of responsibility. After the 67th Medical Group relocated to I Corps Tactical Zone in February, the evacuation capabilities of the 68th Medical Group were increased by the addition of one air ambulance detachment, two ground ambulance companies, and three bus ambulance detachments. The area of responsibility of the 68th Medical Group was increased to include the entire III and IV Corps Tactical Zones. In December the number of air ambulance detachments was increased to four with the deployment of the 247th Medical Detachment to Dong Tam.

With the increase in the area to be supported, available air ambulances were relocated to provide better coverage. The 57th Medical Detachment, 1st Flight Platoon of the 45th Medical Company and the 2d Flight Platoon of the 45th Medical Company were located with the company headquarters at Long Binh Post; the 3d Flight Platoon of the 45th Medical Company was located at Vung Tau, and the 4th Flight Platoon of the 45th Medical Company was located at Lai Khe; the 159th Medical Detachment was located at Cu Chi, the 82d Medical Detachment was stationed at Soc Trang; and the 247th Medical Detachment was located at Dong Tam. In addition to the III and IV Corps Tactical Zone commitments, the 68th Medical Group had the requirement to dispatch two aircraft with. crews to the operational control of the 43d Medical Group from 5 May thru the end of the year.

The established routine of patient evacuation within the 68th Medical Group area of responsibility followed a general pattern. Personnel at field sites relayed requests for aeromedical evacuation, via radio, through tactical medical channels, either to a field standby helicopter or the air ambulance company or one of its detachments. A helicopter would be dispatched to the field location. Immediately following pick-up, the evacuation pilot would establish contact with the group medical regulator providing the essential information on the patient's condition and other details as required. With this information the group medical regulator determined the nearest facility that could provide the treatment required.

The 68th Medical Group operated a medical regulating patient evacuation net twenty-four hours per day. Two FM transmitters, two separate FM receivers, and a single side band radio facilitated coordination with tactical elements, aeromedical helicopters, other helicopters evacuating patients, Air Force aircraft, hospital receiving areas, and control personnel accompanying patients moved by ground ambulances.

Large haul aircraft from both Army and Air Force resources were used extensively in support of patient evacuation from field locations, between hospitals, and from hospital to aerial ports of embarkation, particularly to Air Force casualty staging facilities.

Army Chinook (CH-47) helicopters provided remote field pick-ups and transfers of patients when the casualty load was beyond the resources of aeromedical evacuation helicopters. During the Tet Offensive Chinooks were used extensively for patient transfers between hospitals and the 21st Casualty Staging Flight at Tan Son Nhut. Chinooks were also used when the tactical situation dictated that a surgical hospital would be cleared of the less seriously injured patients to make room for more casualties.

Air Force C-130 and C-7A aircraft were used extensively between medical groups, between hospitals within the group and between hospitals and Air Force facilities. In April 1968, a daily flight was initiated to the 21st Casualty Staging Flight at Tan Son Nhut Air Force Base and the 6th Convalescent Center at Cam Ranh Bay. The 903d Aeromedical Evacuation Squadron flew this mission daily making patient transfers between hospitals on the route, and between hospitals and the 21st Casualty Staging Flight and the 6th Convalescent Center. In November 1968, a mission was in initiated using a C-74 aircraft for patient transfers from facilities where the airfield was not capable of handling the larger C-130 or the number of patients to be moved was not large enough to warrant the use of a larger fixed wing aircraft.

The bus ambulance detachment moved large numbers of patients. Limited by the patient's condition, the tactical situation, the security and the serviceability of the road networks, the ambulance bus more than proved its worth. The 3/4 ton ambulance has Contributed significantly to patient movement, particularly from isolated areas and small dispensaries and between facilities when patient loads were small.

At the end of 1968, 454,330 patients had been admitted to 68th Medical Group facilities. Patients admitted ranged from those with traumatic amputations, extremity wounds, burns, sprains, fractures and other, more serious and war related injuries to malaria, hepatitis, intestinal disorders and other medical conditions. Patients requiring periods of rather long convalescence were evacuated to the 6th Convalescent Center, 43d Medical Group or to Pacific Area Command hospitals.

In October 1968, the 74th Field Hospital assumed the mission of the 50th Medical Company (Clearing). The increased numbers of professional staff in the hospital allowed for a greater range of treatment available within the PW compound and alleviated the need for referrals to the 24th Evacuation Hospital. The 74th Field Hospital was the central treatment facility for all prisoners of war and detainees in the ITI and IV Corps Tactical Zones. In December 1968, the 74th Field Hospital also assumed responsibility for providing in-patient care for the female prisoners of war and female detainees which had been previously provided by the 24th Evacuation Hospital.

The 68th Medical Group fully participated in the Civilian War Casualty Program (CWCP). The treatment of civilians injured as a result of hostile action relieved undue suffering and fostered Vietnamese-American relationships. U.S. medical evacuation ensured better and faster treatment to those patients. CWCP patients received required out-patient or in-patient care at appropriate 68th Medical Group facilities. During 1968 there were 2,650 CWCP patients treated in 68th Medical Group facilities.

==== 1969 ====
During 1969 the 68th Medical Group provided field army level medical service for the III and IV Corps Tactical Zones, or about 40% of the entire land mass of South Vietnam and 45% of the authorized army-level hospital beds. Major tactical units supported during the period in the III and IV Corps Tactical Zones were the 1st, 9th, and 25th Infantry Divisions, 101st Airborne Division (Airmobile) (Rear), 199th Light Infantry Brigade (Separate), 11th Armored Cavalry Regiment, 3d Brigade of the 82d Airborne Division, 1st Cavalry Division (Airmobile), 1st Australian Task Force, the Royal Thai Volunteer Regiment, and the 5th, 7th, 9th, 18th, 21st, and 25th Infantry Divisions (ARVN).

Forty-five units were assigned to the 68th Medical Group as of 31 December 1969. The 68th Medical Group remained the largest in the country as of that date, with three evacuation hospitals, three surgical hospitals, one field hospital, one medical battalion, one medical company (air ambulance) with three additional attached helicopter ambulance detachments (RA), one medical company (clearing), two ground ambulance companies, and numerous small medical units. The present area of responsibility encompasses approximately 30,000 square miles ranging from the southern tip of the Mekong Delta region to Song Be, a distance of 240 miles.

Organizational changes during CY 1969 were as follows:

Unit	Date	Remarks
561st Medical Company (Ambulance)	20 January 1969	Moved to Tan Son Nhut Air Base, Saigon
4th Flight Platoon, 45th Medical Company (Air Ambulance)	15 February 1969	Moved from Lai Khe to Long Binh
57th Medical Detachment (Helicopter Ambulance)	15 February 1969	Moved from Long Binh to Lai Khe
82d Medical Detachment (Helicopter Ambulance)	15 March 1969	Moved from Soc Trang to Binh Thuy
7th Surgical Hospital	Stand-down 15 March 1969	Zero Balanced 10 May 1969
650th Medical Detachment (KJ)	Redeployed 10 June 1969	Completed 15 July 1969
551st Transportation Detachment (Helicopter Maintenance)	25 June 1969	Deployed from Fort Hood, Texas
50th Medical Company (Clearing)	Relocated 6 July 1969	Completed 30 July 1969
74th Field Hospital	Redeployed 10 July 1969	Completed 13 August 1969
45th Medical Detachment (KB)	Phase-out 15 July 1969	Completed 15 August 1969
20th Preventive Medicine Unit (Service) (Field)	21 July 1969	Assigned from 44th Medical Brigade to 68th Medical Group
61st Medical Detachment (LB)	21 July 1969	Assigned from 44th Medical Brigade to 68th Medical Group
3d Flight Platoon, 45th Medical Company (Air Ambulance)	15 August 1969	Moved from Vung Tau to Long Binh
3d Surgical Hospital	20 August 1969	Moved from Dong Tam to Can Tho
133d Medical Detachment (OA)	1 October 1969	Moved from Cat Lai to Bearcat
29th Evacuation Hospital	Inactivated 1 October 1969	Completed 22 October 1969
202d Medical Detachment (MB)	Inactivated 1 October 1969	Completed 1 November 1969
541st Medical Detachment (MB)	Inactivated 1 October 1969	Completed 3 November 1969
872d Medical Detachment (RB)	9 October 1969	Moved from Vung Tau to Long Binh
36th Evacuation Hospital	Inactivated 15 October 1969	Completed 28 November 1969
247th Medical Detachment (Helicopter Ambulance)	5 November 1969	Moved from Long Binh to Phan Rang
20th Preventive Medicine Unit (Service) (Field)	24 November 1969	Moved from Binh Hoa to Long Binh
61st Medical Detachment (LB)	24 November 1969	Moved from Binh Hoa to Long Binh

During 1969, a total of 69,197 patients were admitted to 68th Medical Group hospitals. Other patient care related statistics include 18,493 patients evacuated out-of-country; 99,558 patients transported by Dustoff Aircraft while flying 38,097 hours; and 35,322 patients returned to duty from the group's hospitals. The average length of stay was 3–5 days for patients who were wounded in action and 7–10 days for patients with disease.

On 2 October 1969, while assigned as a medical evacuation pilot with the 82d Medical Detachment (Helicopter Ambulance), 45th Medical Company (Air Ambulance), Chief Warrant Officer Michael J. Novosel, Jr. performed the actions for which he would be awarded the Medal of Honor. On the morning of 2 October 1969, Novosel set out to evacuate a group of South Vietnamese soldiers who were surrounded by several thousand North Vietnamese light infantry near the Cambodian border. Radio communication was lost and the soldiers had expended their ammunition. Without air cover or fire support, Novosel flew at low altitude under continuous enemy fire. He skimmed the ground with his helicopter while his medic and crew chief yanked the wounded men on board. He completed 15 hazardous extractions, was wounded in a barrage of enemy fire, and momentarily lost control of his helicopter, but when it was over, he had rescued 29 men. He completed his tour in March 1970.

==== 1970 ====
During 1970, the 68th Medical Group provided field army Level medical service for the II South, III and IV Military Regions, or about 70% of the entire land mass of South Vietnam, an increase of 30% over the group's area of responsibility in 1969, and 48% of the army level hospital beds, an increase of 3%. Major tactical units supported were the 1st Infantry Division, 3d Brigade of the 9th Infantry Division, 199th Light Infantry Brigade (Separate), 11th Armored Cavalry Regiment, 1st Cavalry Division (Airmobile), 4th Infantry Division, 1st Australian Task Force, the Royal Thai Volunteer Regiment, 25th Infantry Division, and the 7th, 9th, 18th, 21st, and 25th Infantry Divisions (ARVN), the White Horse and Tiger Divisions (ROK), and the 196th Light Infantry Brigade (Separate).

Fifty-two units were assigned to the 68th Medical Group for command and control as of 31 December 1970. The 68th Medical Group remained the largest in Vietnam with two evacuation hospitals, two surgical hospitals, one convalescent center, two field hospitals, one medical battalion, two medical companies (clearing), two medical companies (ambulance), one medical company (air ambulance) and numerous small medical units. The present area of responsibility encompasses approximately 50,000 square miles, running from the southern tip of the Mekong Delta Region to Tuy Hoa, a distance of 450 miles.

Organizational changes during 1970 are reflected in the table below:

Unit	Date	Remarks
105th Medical Detachment (LA)	15 January 1970	Assigned to 20th Preventive Medicine Unit (Service) (Field)
128th Medical Detachment (OA)	15 January 1970	Moved from Dalat to Cam Rahn Bay
247th Medical Detachment (RA)	15 January 1970	Moved from Cam Rahn Bay to Long Binh
57th Medical Detachment (RA)	5 February 1970	Moved from Lai Khe to Binh Thuy
61st Medical Battalion	11 February 1970	Assigned to 67th Medical Group
2d Surgical Hospital	15 February 1970	Standdown
	10 March 1970	Inactivated
67th Medical Detachment (KF)	16 February 1970	Inactivated
551st Medical Detachment (KH)	16 February 1970	Inactivated
241st Medical Detachment (MB)	18 February 1970	Inactivated
945th Medical Detachment (KA)	20 February 1970	Inactivated
58th Medical Battalion	1 May 1970	Reorganized as an evacuation battalion
98th Medical Detachment (KO)	1 May 1970	Reassigned to 67th Medical Group
440th Medical Detachment (RB)	1 May 1970	Relocated to Long Binh from Cam Rahn Bay and zero-balanced
55th Medical Group HHD	25 June 1970	Inactivated
667th Medical Detachment (AC)	25 June 1970	Inactivated
418th Medical Company (Ambulance)	1 July 1970	2d platoon relocated to Long Binh from Cam Rahn Bay and zero-balanced
34th Medical Detachment (OA)	15 July 1970	Moved to Tan Son Nhut from Saigon and zero-balanced
673d Medical Detachment (OA)	15 July 1970	IReassigned to 67th Medical Group and zero-balanced
561st Medical Company (Ambulance)	15 July 1970	Standdown
	30 July 1970	Inactivated
933d Medical Detachment (KB)	1 July 1970	Relocated from Na Trang to Long Binh
498th Medical Detachment (RE)	20 July 1970	Zero-balanced
45th Surgical Hospital	1 August 1970	Standdown
		Moved from Tay Ninh to Long Binh at zero strength
551st Transportation Detachment	1 August 1970	Inactivated
254th Medical Detachment (RA)	31 October 1970	Standdown
	15 November 1970	Inactivated
45th Medical Company (Air Ambulance)	1 November 1970	4th Flight Platoon Standdown
	28 November 1970	Zero-balanced
136th Medical Detachment (MA)	1 November 1970	Zero-balanced
283d Medical Detachment (MB)	1 November 1970	Reassigned from 67th Medical Group to 68th Medical Group
12th Evacuation Hospital	25 November 1970	Standdown
	19 December 1970	Inactivated at Fort Lewis, Washington
8th Field Hospital	1 August 1970	Assigned to 67th Medical Group, less personnel and Equipment
	3 December 1970	Reassigned from 67th Medical Group to 68th Medical Group
53d Medical Detachment (KA)	10 December 1970	Transferred to 67th Medical Group
50th Medical Company (Clearing)	15 December 1970	Moved from Long Binh to Cam Rahn Bay
159th Medical Detachment (RA)	15 December 1970	Moved from Cu Chi to Cam Rahn Bay
568th Medical Company (Clearing)	15 December 1970	Zero balanced

With the closing out of medical units in the last three months of 1970, the overall assigned strength of units of the 68th Medical Group far exceeded the authorized strength. This enlisted overstrength made a significant impact on these units and caused a critical billeting problem. A U.S. Army Vietnam program of permitting early departure from the command for enlisted personnel in grades E-1 through E-6 and certain officer personnel with noncritical specialties precluded the billeting situation from becoming untenable. At the end of the year, the 68th Medical Group was authorized 2,004 enlisted personnel and was staffed at 123% strength with 2,474 assigned.

A decrease in funding and subsequent reduction in construction engineering support was experienced throughout the group. New construction was virtually non-existent and only critical and essential repairs were given consideration. The majority of 68th Medical Group major subordinate units established informal repair and utilities sections to cope with urgent minor repairs. A major impact of the withdrawal of construction engineering support started on 1 October 1970 with the closeout of the PA&E detachment at the 93d Evacuation Hospital.

For the year 1970, a total of 51,189 patients were admitted to 68th Medical Group hospitals. Other statistics of interest are:

Out-of-country Evacuation	9,714
Hours flown by Dustoff	48,543
Patients moved by Dustoff	92,697
Patients returned to duty	32,320
Average length of stay:	
Wounded in action	7.5 days
Disease	6.3 days

==== 1971 ====
During 1971 the 68th Medical Group provided field army level medical support to United States Armed Forces personnel, Civilian War Casualty Program patients, Free World Military Assistance Forces personnel, and other categories of personnel as directed by higher headquarters. The group served the areas designated as Military Region II (South) and Military Regions III and IV of the Republic of Vietnam.

The major tactical units located in the 68th Medical Group's area of operation were:

- 1st Cavalry Division (Airmobile)
- 11th Armored Cavalry Regiment (-)
- White Horse Division (ROK)
- 1st Australian Task Force
- Royal Thai Volunteer Regiment
- 5th Division (ARVN)
- 7th Division (ARVN)
- 9th Division (ARVN)
- 18th Division (ARVN)
- 21st Division (ARVN)
- 23d Division (ARVN)
- 25th Division (ARVN)

The major feature of the group's organization during 1971 was the steady reduction in size as the withdrawal of U.S. and Free World Military Assistance Forces accelerated. At the end of 1971, the 68th Medical Group consisted of a surgical hospital, an evacuation hospital, a field hospital, two drug treatment centers, four helicopter ambulance detachments, numerous teams and dispensaries, a preventive medicine unit, and a veterinary service unit. During the year, a total of 58 units were assigned to the 68th Medical Group. At the end of the year only 20 units were still active.

Units assigned, their locations, and their dispositions were:

Unit	Location	Date of action	Action taken
8th Field Hospital	Tuy Hoa, Military Region (MR) II (South)	15 August 1961	Redeployed to Fort Lewis, Washington
176th Medical Detachment (JB)	Tuy Hoa, MR II (South)	15 April 1971	Inactivated
440th Medical Detachment (RB)	Tuy Hoa, MR II (South)	15 March 1971	Inactivated
6th Convalescent Center	Cam Rahn Bay, MR II (South)	30 October 1971	Inactivated
*U.S. Army Drug Treatment Center, Cam Rahn Bay	Cam Rahn Bay, MR II (South)	31 October 1971	Activated as TDA organization
50th Medical Company (Clearing) (-)	Cam Rahn Bay, MR II (South)	30 October 1971	Inactivated
1st Platoon, 50th Medical Company (Clearing)	Ban Me Thout, MR II (South)	30 October 1971	Inactivated
2d Platoon, 584th Medical Company (Ambulance)	Cam Rahn Bay, MR II (South)	20 September 1971	Reduced to zero strength
		15 December 1971	Inactivated
568th Medical Company (Clearing)	Cam Rahn Bay, MR II (South)	15 March 1971	Inactivated
*128th Medical Detachment (OA)	Cam Rahn Bay, MR II (South)		
221st Medical Detachment (MB)	Cam Rahn Bay, MR II (South)	30 May 1971	Inactivated
*349th Medical Detachment (MB)	Cam Rahn Bay, MR II (South)		
*575th Medical Detachment (MB)	Nha Trang, MR II (South)		
*247th Medical Detachment (RA)	Phan Rang, MR II (South)		
*4th Medical Detachment (JB)	Long Binh Base, MR III		
Company B, 6th Convalescent Center	Long Binh Base, MR III	June 1971	Organized to operate drug treatment center
		31 October 1971	Inactivated
*U.S. Army Drug Treatment Center, Long Binh	Long Binh Base, MR III	31 October 1971	Activated as TDA organization
*20th Preventive Medicine Unit (Service) (Field)	Long Binh Base, MR III		
*24th Evacuation Hospital	Long Binh Base, MR III		
16th Medical Detachment (MA)	Long Binh Base, MR III	1 December 1971	Reduced to zero strength
		15 December 1971	Inactivated
46th Medical Detachment (KB)	Long Binh Base, MR III	15 November 1971	Reduced to zero strength
61st Medical Detachment (MB)	Plantation, MR III		Reduced to zero strength
*84th Medical Detachment (OA)	Long Binh Base, MR III		
104th Medical Detachment (KD)	Long Binh Base, MR III	15 November 1971	Reduced to zero strength
*133d Medical Detachment (OA)	Long Binh Base, MR III		
136th Medical Detachment (MA)	Long Binh Base, MR III	15 November 1971	Reduced to zero strength
142d Medical Detachment (MA)	Long Binh Base, MR III	15 November 1971	Reduced to zero strength
332d Medical Detachment (MB)	Long Binh Base, MR III	5 May 1971	Reduced to zero strength
345th Medical Detachment (MB)	Long Binh Base, MR III	15 November 1971	Reduced to zero strength
346th Medical Detachment (MA)	Long Binh Base, MR III	15 October 1971	Reduced to zero strength
		15 December 1971	Inactivated
584th Medical Company (Ambulance) (-)	Long Binh Base, MR III	15 October 1971	Reduced to zero strength
		15 December 1971	Inactivated
872d Medical Detachment (RE)	Long Binh Base, MR III	20 September 1971	Reduced to zero strength
		15 December 1971	Inactivated
930th Medical Detachment (MB)	Long Binh Base, MR III	1 June 1971	Reduced to zero strength
933d Medical Detachment (KE)	Long Binh Base, MR III	1 December 1971	Reduced to zero strength
		10 December 1971	Inactivated
935th Medical Detachment (KO)	Long Binh Base, MR III	15 November 1971	Reduced to zero strength
2d Medical Detachment (MA)	Long Binh Base, MR III	15 November 1971	Inactivated
194th Medical Detachment (MC)	Long Binh Base, MR III	15 March 1971	Inactivated
498th Medical Detachment (RE)	Long Binh Base, MR III	15 March 1971	Inactivated
936th Medical Detachment (ID)	Long Binh Base, MR III	15 March 1971	Inactivated
25th Medical Detachment (MA)	Long Binh Base, MR III	15 April 1971	Inactivated
439th Medical Detachment (RE)	Long Binh Base, MR III	15 April 1971	Inactivated
418th Medical Company (Ambulance)	Long Binh Base, MR III	15 April 1971	Inactivated
45th Medical Company (Air Ambulance)	Long Binh Base, MR III	30 April 1971	Inactivated
58th Medical Battalion	Long Binh Base, MR III	10 June 1971	Reduced to zero strength
93d Evacuation Hospital	Long Binh Base, MR III	29 April 1971	Redeployed to Fort Leonard Wood, Missouri
*159th Medical Detachment (RA)	Long Binh Base, MR III		
*283d Medical Detachment (RA)	Long Binh Base, MR III		
*3d Field Hospital	Saigon, Capitol Military District		
51st Field Hospital	Saigon, Capitol Military District	30 June 1971	Inactivated
*62d Medical Detachment (KA)	Saigon, Capitol Military District		
*218th Medical Detachment (MC)	Saigon, Capitol Military District		
*229th Medical Detachment (MC)	Saigon, Capitol Military District		
629th Medical Detachment (KP)	Saigon, Capitol Military District	15 December 1971	Reduced to zero strength
*3d Surgical Hospital	Binh Thuy MR IV		
43d Medical Detachment (RB)	Binh Thuy MR IV	15 December 1971	Inactivated
3d Platoon, 50th Medical Company (Clearing)	Binh Thuy MR IV	30 October 1971	Inactivated
*57th Medical Detachment (RA)	Binh Thuy MR IV		
82d Medical Detachment (RA)	Binh Thuy MR IV	31 October 1971	Redeployed to Fort Riley, Kansas

-* Units still active on 31 December 1971

The organization of two Drug Treatment Centers and a Drug Holding Center alone generated new requirements for 23 Medical Corps Officers, 37 Medical Service Corps Officers, 46 nurses, and 479 enlisted. A significant portion of the enlisted positions were in three occupational specialties, 91F-neuropsychiatric specialist, 91G-Social Work specialist, and 71G-Medical records Specialist. Requirements for these specialties far exceeded in-country resources and required emergency requisitions from the continental United States. Initially most staffing requirements for the centers were provided from in-country personnel resources. Considerable personnel turbulence was encountered when the drug treatment centers initially opened. Within a short time, several hundred persons, to include officers and enlisted, were reassigned to the drug treatment centers. Due to averages in many occupational specialties the reassignments from hospitals, dispensaries, and other units were accomplished without compromising any missions. Personnel turbulence remained active for several months until final staffing documents were approved and subsequent fill action on most military occupational specialties were completed. Tension associated with assignment in the drug treatment centers was instrumental in the philosophy behind developing a command policy providing for in-country rotation of personnel assigned to drug treatment centers upon completion of six months in the center, subject to availability of replacements and time remaining in-country. This policy applied to officers and enlisted and was considered to be a major morale factor as it provided for those personnel, who were not enthusiastic about their assignments to the drug treatment centers a specific tour of duty after which they could look forward to possible reassignment and release from the tensions of the drug treatment center environment.

Shortly after the initial drug center was opened approximately 125 enlisted personnel in military occupational specialties 91G and 91F arrived in Vietnam from the continental United States on temporary duty for a period of 90 days to assist in getting the drug program started. Permanent replacements for those temporary duty personnel reached approximately 50% of requirements at the time the temporary duty period was to end. To assure continuity in the drug treatment program it was necessary to extend many of the temporary duty enlisted beyond the originally intended 90 days. Several of the enlisted expressed dissatisfaction with this arrangement, which only increased tension in the drug centers. As permanent party personnel arrived, temporary duty personnel were returned to the continental United States. Within 30 days after the extension practically all temporary duty personnel had been released from Vietnam. At the end of 1971, the command assigned strength for enlisted social work specialists was above authorized strength, but the drug centers were at approximately 50% strength in neuropsychiatric specialists.

Staffing of the drug treatment centers was perhaps the most challenging aspect of personnel management in the 68th Medical Group during 1971. The organization of drug treatment centers, as a part of the drug counter offensive, created two distinct problems: first, identifying staff personnel, and second, motivating the staff. Volunteers for duty in the drug treatment centers were solicitated throughout Vietnam but the response was minimal. Consequently, it was necessary to assign many staff members, both officers and enlisted, involuntarily to the drug treatment centers. Thus, motivating the staff toward working with drug abusers was a major concern of the drug treatment centers' commanding officers which were accomplished with varying degrees of success.

Throughout 1971, several units of the 68th Medical Group were inactivated or reduced to zero strength. Manpower resources, for the most part were reassigned to the major medical activity which previously had command and control of these units. Economy of resources under a centralized command did generate some excess personnel. Also, many personnel, both officer and enlisted assigned to these units were given curtailments on their foreign service tours. The criteria for determining curtailments changed with each increment of withdrawal. Taking many units to zero strength prior to their designation as Keystone (the U.S. withdrawal program) enabled the command to retain sufficient personnel resources to meet changing requirements.

As units other than those in the 68th Medical Group were being inactivated and redeployed, many officers and enlisted were being reassigned to the group. With the increased withdrawal of United States Forces from Vietnam, personnel reassigned from these units were often again caught in units phasing out, therefore requiring in some cases, three and four reassignments during their tours.

Area Medical Support: In order to provide area medical support, the group attached dispensaries in 2.n area to a hospital for command and control. In MR II South the dispensaries located at Nha Trang, Cam Ranh Bay, and Dalat were attached to the 6th Convalescent Center, redesignated as the U.S. Army, Drug Treatment Center, Cam Ranh Bay. In the Long Binh/Bien Hoa area they were attached to the 24th Evacuation Hospital at Long Binh. The dispensaries in the Saigon/Tan Son Nhut area were attached to the 3d Field Hospital.

During 1971, the area support paradigm moved toward the Medical Department Activity (MEDDAC) concept of support. To do this, many TOE dispensaries were brought to zero strength in the Long Binh area and a central post dispensary was established within the facilities of the 24th Evacuation Hospital. At the end of 1971, plans were being developed to zero out the two general dispensaries attached to the 3d Field Hospital and perform the mission with resources assigned to the hospital. These actions resulted in conservation of personnel and equipment, while adopting a posture to provide maximum support during future withdrawals. By doing this, the group attained maximum flexibility using existing assets.

Hospitalization: The sole hospitalization facility in MR II South after the closure of ·the 25-bed 8th Field Hospital in August 1971 was the 483d USAF Hospital at Cam Ranh Bay. This facility was utilized to the fullest by Army personnel.

At the close of 1971, hospitals operated by the 68th Medical Group were:

HOSPITAL	LOCATION	OPERATIONAL BEDS	SPECIALTIES
24th Evacuation Hospital	Long Binh Post, MR III	290	Neurosurgical and Burn Center
3d Field Hospital	Saigon, Capitol Military District	225	Elective Surgery and Renal Care
3d Surgical Hospital	Binh Thuy, MR IV	50	

Hospitalization statistics for the 68th Medical Group for 1971 are presented in the table below:

	1970		1971	
ADMISSIONS	Army	Total	Army	Total
Direct				
Transfers				
_________________________________	_______	_______	_______	_______
TOTAL ADMISSIONS	37,802	52,136	16,169	22,986
DISPOSITIONS				
Out of Country Evacuations		9,804		5,722
Hospital Deaths		1,174		340
Other (RTD, Discharge, Transfers)		40,900		16542
_________________________________	_______	_______	_______	_______
TOTAL DISPOSITIONS		52,878		22,604

Notes:
-Number of dispositions does not equal number of admissions due to patients remaining in hospital at midnight, 31 December 1971.
-WIA=Wounded in action
-DNBI=Disease and non-battle injury
-RTD=Returned to duty

Evacuation: Until its standdown on 31 May 1971, the 58th Medical Battalion controlled all ground and aeromedical evacuations in the group's area of responsibility. After its standdown, all ground evacuation units were assigned to hospitals and the aeromedical evacuation Units were assigned directly to the 68th Medical Group for all purposes. To facilitate control of those units, an aviation staff section was established as a primary staff section in the group headquarters. The section included an Aviation Staff Officer, Safety Officer, Aircraft Maintenance Officer, and an Operations Sergeant.

Establishment of the Drug Treatment Center, Cam Ranh Bay: A significant change was made in the mission of the 6th Convalescent Center on 15 June 1971, when it became the first operational drug treatment center in Vietnam. The unit was preparing to standdown from its mission as a convalescent center specializing in the care of malaria and hepatitis patients when the new mission was assigned. Because its MTOE was not structured for the drug treatment mission, the new mission necessitated a major reorganization of the 6th Convalescent Center. On 30 October 1971, the 6th Convalescent Center was inactivated and the U.S. Army Drug Treatment Center, Cam Ranh Bay was activated to replace it. The Drug Treatment Center was organized on a TDA specifically structured for the drug treatment mission. Although there were minor organizational problems with the TDA, it proved to be an adequate organizational structure. In addition to the drug treatment mission, the Drug Treatment Center, Cam Ranh Bay was also responsible for area medical support in Military Region II South. For this mission, it had dispensaries located at Cam Ranh Bay South, Nha Trang, Dalat, and the 22d Replacement Battalion.

Establishment of the Drug Treatment Center, Long Binh: A second drug treatment center was established at Long Binh. It was initially designated as B Company 6th Convalescent Center but was attached for all purposes to Headquarters, 68th Medical Group. Although this designation served the purpose of identifying the unit in the existing force structure and permitted establishment of a separate morning report, it was confusing. The situation was rectified on 30 October 1971, when the U.S. Army Drug Treatment Center, Long Binh was activated as a TDA organization and B Company, 6th Convalescent Center, was inactivated.

Unlike the Drug Treatment Center, Cam Ranh Bay, which used an existing organization and facilities, the Drug Treatment Center at Long Binh was constructed from the ground up. There were good and bad aspects of this. The facilities at Long Binh were more austere and delays in completion were partially the cause for a delayed opening of the center. It did, however, have much better security, providing a much closer approach to a drug free environment so important in the drug treatment program. Additionally, although there were problems in assembling a staff, the problem of transferring from an existing mission to a new one was avoided, also, the delays in opening the facility enabled the Long Binh staff to benefit from lessons learned at Cam Ranh Bay.

Establishment of the Drug Abuse Holding Center: On 24 September 1971, the Drug Abuse Holding Center was opened at Long Binh, utilizing the facilities of the old USARV Stockade (more commonly referred to as Long Bình Jail or LBJ). Its mission differed from that of the Drug Treatment Centers, in that admissions were limited to personnel recommended for elimination under the provisions of Army Regulation 635-212 and a small number of other personnel such as discipline problems referred from the Drug Treatment Centers. Disposition from the Drug Abuse Holding Center was ordinarily by aeromedical evacuation to the continental United States for discharge from the service. Although the Drug Abuse Holding Center was located in a former stockade, and was operated by the Military Police, the personnel admitted were considered to be patients. The medical component of the Drug Abuse Holding Center, organized much like a Drug Treatment Center, was assigned as a separate organizational element of the U.S. Army Drug Treatment Center, Long Binh under the operational control of the Commanding Officer, U.S. Army Drug Abuse Holding Center.

Initially there were problems with the concept resulting from the different philosophies of Military Police and Medical Department personnel. Careful selection of the staff and close coordination minimized these problems and the facility operated comparatively smoothly.

==== 1972 ====
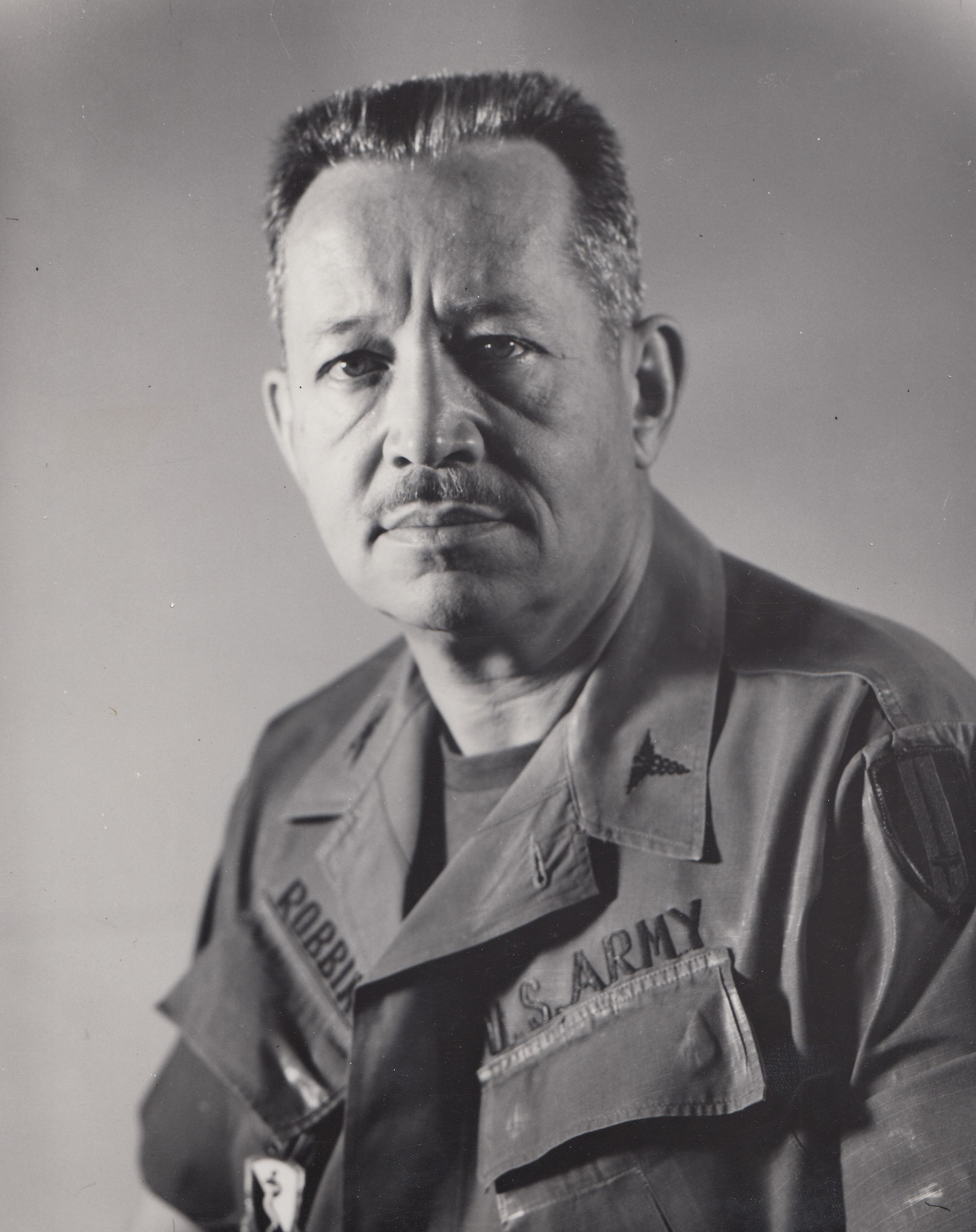
Command photo of Colonel Thomas L. Robbins, Commander of the 68th Medical Group from 13 December 1971 to 19 March 1972

During 1972, the 68th Medical Group provided Field Army level medical support to United States Armed Forces Personnel, Civilian War Casualties, Free World Military Assistance Forces personnel, and other categories of personnel as directed by higher headquarters. The group served the areas designated as Military Region II (South) and Military Regions III and IV of the Republic of Vietnam.

The most significant change in the group's organization in 1972 was the drastic reduction in size as a result of the large-scale reduction of Free World Military Assistance Forces. As the group began its standdown, it was divested of its major treatment facilities as provisional Medical Department Activities (MEDDACs) were formed around them. These units were the 3d Field Hospital and the 24th Evacuation Hospital. Additionally, two of its four helicopter ambulance detachments were assigned to newly formed MEDDACs. At the beginning of the year the group had one surgical hospital, an evacuation hospital, a field hospital, two drug treatment centers, four helicopter ambulance detachments, a preventive medicine unit, a veterinary service unit and numerous teams and detachments. At the end of the period, which ended at standdown, the group consisted of a drug treatment center, a veterinary service unit and a helicopter ambulance detachment.

On 20 March 1972 the U.S. Army Medical Command, Vietnam (USAMEDCOMV) realigned the command structure leaving under the command and control of the 68th Medical Group only those units scheduled for inactivation, redeployment, or space reductions with the exception of one helicopter ambulance detachment which was scheduled to be relocated in country not later than 10 April 1972 then to be reassigned from under the command and control of the group.

At the start of 1972 the 68th Medical Group had four helicopter ambulance detachments assigned. The 274th Medical Detachment (RA) which was originally located at Phan Rang Air Force Base moved to Nha Trang. The move was completed 10 March 1972. On 25 March the unit was reassigned to the 67th MEDDAC. The 159th Medical Detachment (RA), located at Long Binh was assigned to the 24th MEDDAC on 20 March 1972. The 283d Medical Detachment (RA) also located at Long Binh was redeployed to Fort Bliss, Texas. The 57th Medical Detachment (RA), formerly located at Binh Thuy moved to Long Binh, completing the move on 10 April 1972.

On 1 January 1972, the group had the 3d Surgical Hospital, the 3d Field Hospital and the 24th Evacuation Hospital assigned. On 20 March 1972 the 3d Field Hospita1 and the 24th Evacuation Hospital were relieved from assignment to the group and were assigned directly to Headquarters, USAMEDCOMV as MEDDACs. During the standdown period the 3d Surgical Hospital was notified that it would standdown and be redeployed to Fort Lewis Washington at color guard strength for inactivation.

The group had two drug treatment centers during the portion of the year the group was active. During this period, the Drug Treatment Center, Cam Rahn Bay was notified to stand down in the latter part of the group's standdown period, leaving the Drug Treatment Center Long Binh as the only drug treatment center in-country.

As the broup prepared to stand down, the status of its subordinate units was reflected in the following table:

Unit	Status upon notification	Action
3d Surgical Hospital	Active	Redeployed to Fort Lewis, Washington at Color Guard Strength for inactivation
4th Medical Detachment (JB)	Active	Space Reduction
24th Evacuation Hospital	Active	Space Reduction
61st Medical Detachment (MB)	Zero Strength	Inactivation in-country
HHD, 68th Medical Group	Active	Redeployed to Fort Lewis, Washington at Color Guard Strength for inactivation
84th Medical Detachment (OA)	Active	Inactivation in-country
104th Medical Detachment (KD)	Zero Strength	Inactivation in-country
221 Medical Detachment (MB)	Zero Strength	Inactivation in-country
283d Medical Detachment (RA)	Active	Redeployed to Fort Bliss, Texas at cadre strength
332d Medical Detachment (MB)	Zero Strength	Inactivation in-country
616th Medical Company (Clearing)	Active	Inactivation in-country
935th Medical Detachment (KO)	Zero Strength	Inactivation in-country
U.S. Army Drug Treatment Center Cam Rahn Bay	Active	Inactivation in-country

By 27 June 1972 the group headquarters had been reduced to zero strength, sending the group colors and an escort to Fort Lewis, Washington where it was inactivated on 30 June 1972.

=== Germany ===
==== 1978 ====
The 68th Medical Group was reactivated on 21 October 1978 as part of a major reorganization of the medical assets of the United States Army, Europe. As part of that reorganization, the U.S. Army Medical Command, Europe was inactivated and replaced by the 7th Medical Command on 21 September 1978. Under the US. Army Medical Command, Europe, all field medical units in the command had been assigned to the 30th Medical Group since 1975.

With the reactivation of the 68th Medical Group, in another move to improve combat readiness of U.S. forces in Europe, those field medical units which would fall under V Corps control were assigned to the 68th Medical Group, and those units which would fall under VII Corps) control would be assigned to the 30th Medical Group. In turn, the two medical groups would be assigned to the two corps, rather than to the 7th Medical Command, whereas in the past they would have been attached to the U.S. Army Medical Command, Europe. The 7th Medical Command would continue to provide command and control over all theater level assets, and would control all air ambulances in theater during peacetime operations.

==== 1980 ====
In June 1980 the 68th Medical Group named the installation in Ziegenberg where their headquarters was stationed Camp Paul Bloomquist in honor of the late Lieutenant Colonel Paul Bloomquist an Army Medical Service Corps aviator who had served three tours in Vietnam as a Dustoff pilot. On his first tour, with the 57th Medical Detachment (Helicopter Ambulance), Bloomquist had assumed detachment command following the death of Major Charles L. Kelly on 1 July 1964. On another tour, he commanded the 498th Medical Company (Air Ambulance). Bloomquist had been killed in a complex terrorist attack on the Frankfurt Officers' Club on 11 May 1972 while he was assigned to the V Corps Surgeon's Office.

== Shoulder Sleeve Insignia ==
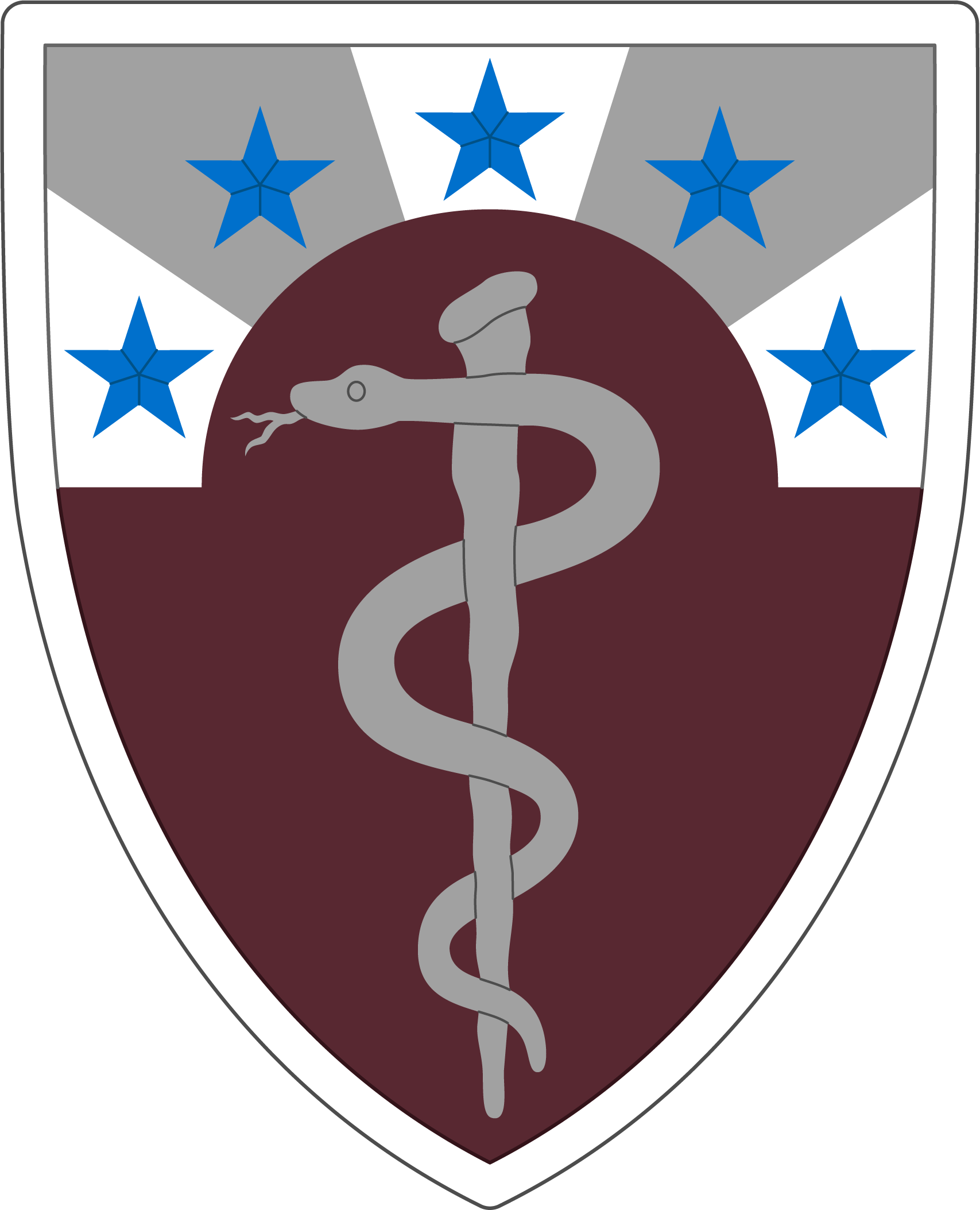
Shoulder Sleeve Insignia, 68th Theater Medical Command

=== Description ===
On a shield shaped embroidered item edged with a 1/8 inch (0.32 cm) white border, 3 1/2 inches (8.9 cm) in height by 2 27/32 inches (7.2 cm) in width blazoned as follows: Sanguine, a stylized Staff of Aesculapius Argent (Silver Gray), a chief pointed nowy to chief enlarged pily of five Argent and Gris bearing five mullets arched Celeste.

=== Symbolism ===
The colors of the shield are those of the Army Medical Service, maroon and white. Silver denotes the tools and technology used within the medical field. The staff is the symbol of Aesculapius, the God of Medicine. The chief suggests a horizon emitting sunrays, a depiction of hope and a guiding light. The blue stars allude to authority and leadership within the Command, and it further ties back to the MRC-Europe and USAREUR-AF.

=== Background ===
The shoulder sleeve insignia was authorized for the 68th Theater Medical Command by DCS G-1 approval effective 7 November 2023.

== Distinctive unit insignia ==
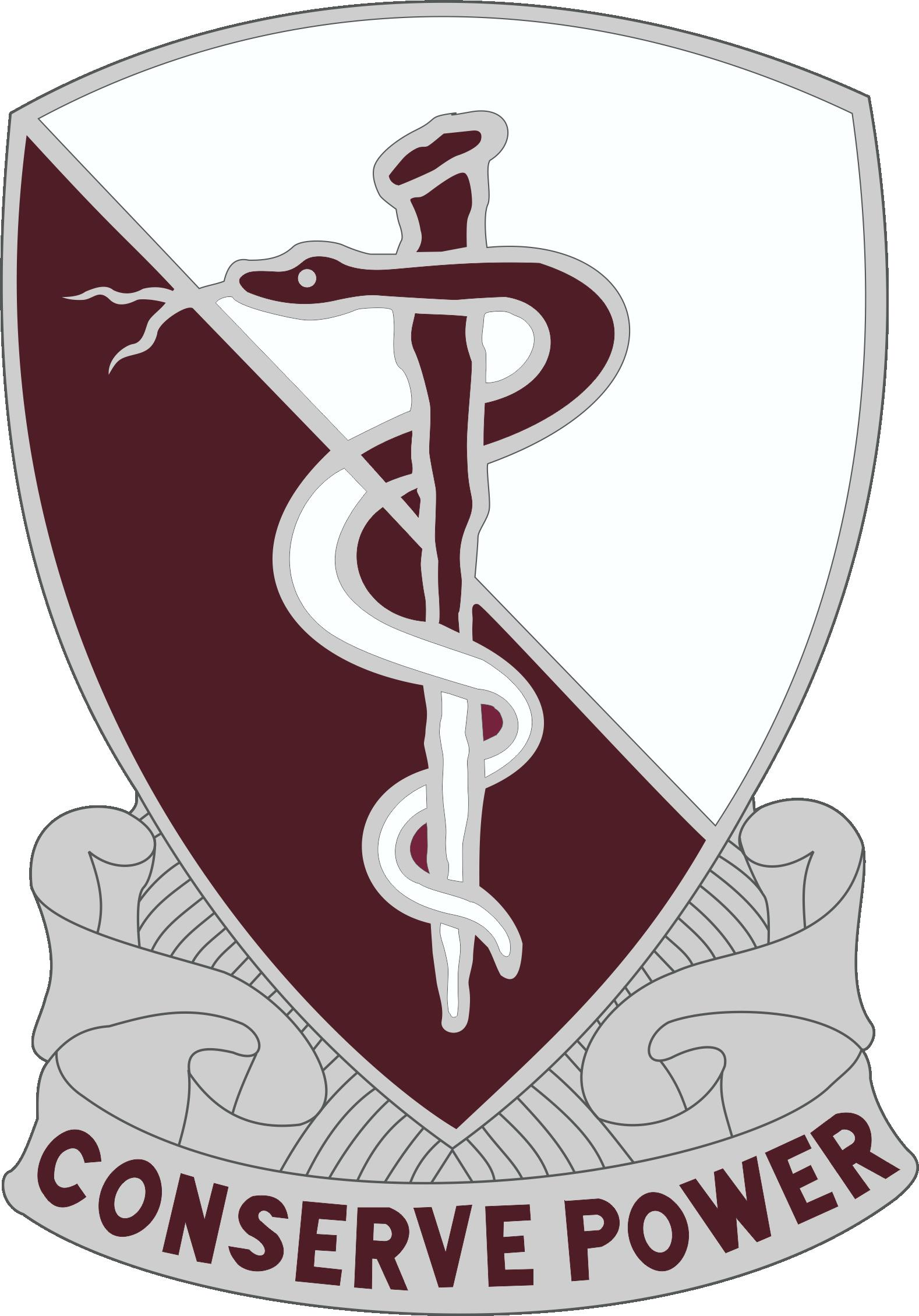
Distinctive Unit Insignia, 68th Theater Medical Command

=== Description ===
A Silver color metal and enamel device 1 1/4 inches (3.2 cm) in height overall consisting of a shield blazoned: Per bend Argent and Sanguine (Maroon), the staff of Aesculapius counterchanged. Attached below and to the sides of the shield a Silver scroll inscribed "CONSERVE POWER" in Maroon letters.

=== Symbolism ===
The colors of the shield are those of the Army Medical Service, sanguine (the nearest heraldic equivalent to the Medical maroon) and white. The staff is the symbol of Aesculapius, the God of Medicine.

=== Background ===
The distinctive unit insignia was originally approved for the 18th Medical Regiment on 20 May 1936. It was redesignated for the 68th Medical Regiment on 16 August 1941. The insignia was redesignated for the 68th Medical Group on 4 December 1967. The DUI was redesignated for the 68th Theater Medical Command 3 March 2023. .

== Commanders ==
=== 18th Medical Regiment ===
Rank	Commander Name	Branch	Start date	End Date	Remarks
COL	Louis L. Goldblatt	MC	9 January 1930	25 May 1941	COL Goldblatt was a member of the Organized Reserves.

=== World War II ===
Rank	Commander Name	Branch	Start Date	End Date	Remarks
COL	Francis P. Kintz	MC		1945	
COL	Frederick W. Timmerman	MC	21 December 1945	7 March 1946	COL Timmerman would command the 44th Medical Brigade in the Republic of Vietnam from 29 May—11 July 1967, and would also serve as Deputy Brigade Commander under BG Glenn J. Collins.

=== Fort George G. Meade, Maryland and Vietnam ===
Rank	Commander Name	Branch	Start Date	End Date	Remarks
COL	Melvin F. Eyerman	MC	27 July 1954	1956	
LTC	Robert B. Kerr	MSC	1956	1957	
COL	Melvin F. Eyerman	MC	1957	1958	
MAJ	Ralph L. Travis	MSC	1958	1959	
COL	John J. Pelosi	MC	1959	1961	
LTC	Joseph Musyka	MSC	1961	1961	
LTC	Richard J. Heinz	MC	1961	1962	
LTC	Edwin R. Overholt	MC	1962	1962	
LTC	John W. Witten	MC	1962	1962	
MAJ	Donald H. Warren	MSC	1962	1962	
LTC	Charles C. Pixley	MC	1962	1962	Pixley would also command the group in Vietnam, and would retire as the Surgeon General of the Army
COL	Jesse W. Brumfield	MSC	1962	3 July 1963	
LTC	William F. White	MSC	4 July 1963	14 August 1963	
COL	Robert F. Lerg	MSC	15 August 1963	6 July 1964	
LTC	Earl C. Cunnington	MSC	7 July 1964	27 July 1964	
LTC	Frank W. Lucas	MSC	28 July 1964	13 August 1964	
COL!	Millard C. Monnen	MSC	14 August 1964	30 November 1965	
LTC	Richard F. Barquist	MC	1 December 1965	26 July 1966	Barquist is the namesake of the Barquist Army Health Clinic, Fort Detrick, Maryland
COL	Charles C. Pixley	MC	27 July 1966	28 June 1967	Pixley would retire as the Surgeon General of the Army
LTC	Richard D. Hamilton	MC	29 June 1967	12 July 1967	
COL	William A. Boyson	MC	13 July 1967	5 October 1967	Boyson would retire as a Major General
COL	Leonard Maldonado	MC	6 October 1967	1 September 1968	
COL	Richard B. Austin, III	MC	2 September 1968	1 May 1969	
COL	Merle D. Thomas	MC	2 May 1969	7 September 1969	
COL	David J. Edwards	MC	8 September 1969	4 August 1970	
COL	John B. Moyar	MC	4 August 1970	4 July 1971	
COL!	Warren H. Brune	MC	4 July 1971	13 December 1971	
COL	Thomas L. Robbins	MC	13 December 1971	19 March 1972	
COL	Ernest M. Bralley	MC	20 March 1972	27 April 1972	

=== Germany ===
Rank	Commander Name	Branch	Start Date	End Date	Remarks
COL	Julius D. Pantalone	MSC	12 October 1978	1980	
COL	Edward H. Uemura	MSC	1980	1982	
COL	Donald A. Johnson	MSC	1982		
COL		MSC		25 June 1985	
COL	James Truscott	MSC	25 June 1985	June 1987	
COL	William L. Speer	MSC	June 1987	1989	
COL	Frank R. Hash	MSC	1989	1991	
COL	Charles G. (Gregg) Stevens	MSC	1991	1993	Deployed the group to Operation Provide Promise in the Balkans, November 1992-June 1993
COL	Peter Cramblett	MSC	1993	15 December 1994	
