= Forward surgical teams =

Mobile medical units

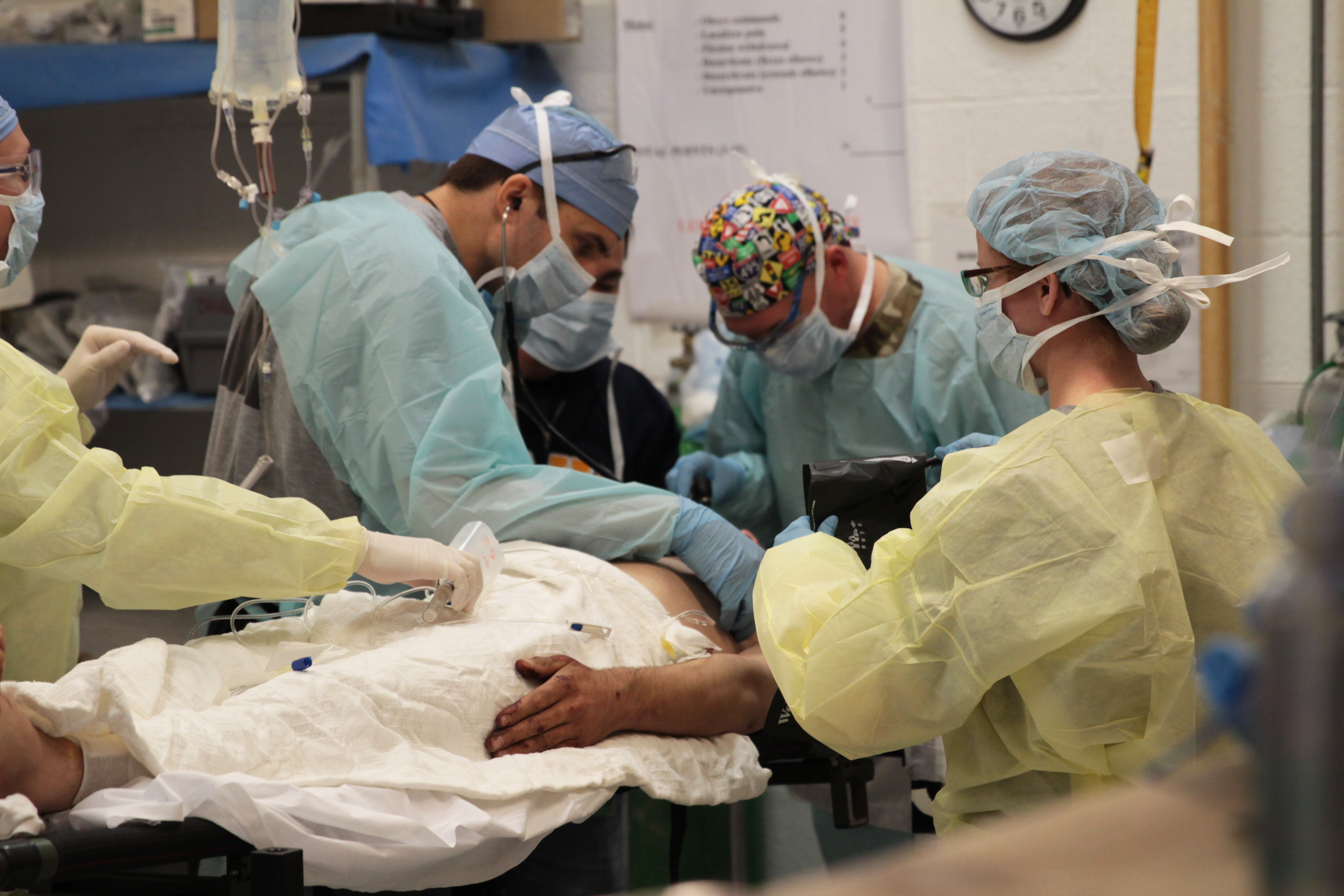
Members of the 541st Forward Surgical Team (FST) (Airborne) perform an assessment of an Afghan man on Forward Operating Base (FOB) Farah, Afghanistan in support of Operation Enduring Freedom (OEF) on December 26, 2012.

In the United States Army, Medical Detachments (Forward Surgical), popularly known as Forward Surgical Teams (FST), are small, mobile surgical units. A functional operating room can be established within one and a half hours of being on scene and break down to move to a new location within two hours of ceasing operations.

The FST typically includes 20 staff members: 4 surgeons, 3 RNs, 2 certified registered nurse anesthetists (CRNAs), 1 administrative officer, 1 detachment sergeant, 3 licensed practical nurses (LPN)'s, 3 surgical techs and 3 medics. Surgeons perform damage control surgery on combat casualties within the "golden hour" of injury whenever possible. Casualties can then be packaged for medical evacuation to a higher level of care.

== History and doctrine ==
First fielded during Operation Just Cause in December 1989. FSTs are utilized in a variety of ways, and can be fielded with support elements, including a Forward Support Medical Company (FSMC), Area Support Medical Company (ASMC), Brigade Medical Company also known as C-Med or in some cases stand alone (although The FST is not designed, staffed, or equipped for standalone operations or for conducting sick-call operations. Augmentation requirements are discussed in FM 4-02.25) to provide a surgical capability at Role 2 for those patients unable to survive MEDEVAC to Role 3 (hospital) care.

By doctrine, given in ATP 4-02.5 (May 2013) Chapter 3 section 10, and ARTEP 8-518-10, the team is capable of continuous operations with a divisional or non-divisional medical company for up to 72 hours with a planned caseload of 30 critical patients. The FST can sustain surgery for 24 total operating table hours and has the ability to separate into two teams while jumping from one site to another. Sustained split operations are common in Iraq and Afghanistan, although not supported by current doctrine in FM 8-10-25.

FSTs are currently deployed in both Afghanistan and Iraq.

== Organization ==
The forward surgical team is organized into four functional areas:

- HEADQUARTERS – Communications, Command and Control, and administrative functions.
- ATLS (advanced trauma life support) – Triages and prepares multiple casualties for surgery or transport and has a total of up to 4 beds or treatment areas with litter stands.
- OR (operating room) – Sets up and begins surgery within one hour, can be at full functioning capacity within two hours of establishing an area of operations. The OR has two separate OR tables that can be used at the same time allowing treatment for a greater number of casualties in a given time.
- PACU/RECOVERY(post-anesthesia care unit) – Number of beds available varies based on mission up to 8 beds, deployment and available resources, for post-surgical care; Most beds will be for patients awaiting medical evacuation. FSTs forward deployed typically do not hold patients beyond recovery but are sometimes forced to due to long medevac times or weather.

== Equipment ==
The Forward Surgical Team equipment and supplies are packed into four HMMWVs each with an M1101 trailer and two LMTV 2.5 ton cargo trucks each with a M1082 cargo trailer. Units are normally augmented with two trailers mounting a power generator and an air conditioning system. These trailers are referred to as ECU [Environmental Control Units] or GET [Generator/ECU Trailers]. When so equipped, two of the M1101 trailers are removed.

The airborne Forward Surgical Team can be slingloaded onto cargo helicopters and moved by the headquarters unit.

== See also ==
- Field hospital
- Combat Support Hospital
- Battalion Aid Stations
- Mobile Army Surgical Hospital
- Portable Surgical Hospital
