= Portable Surgical Hospital =

U.S. military medical unit

During World War II, Portable Surgical Hospitals (PSH) were a type of field hospital within the United States Army. They were units of the United States Army Medical Department designed to be man-portable by the team staffing the hospital. Unique to the Pacific Theater of Operations, they were the operational forebears of the larger, more robust Mobile Army Surgical Hospital (MASH units).

== History of the Portable Surgical Hospitals ==
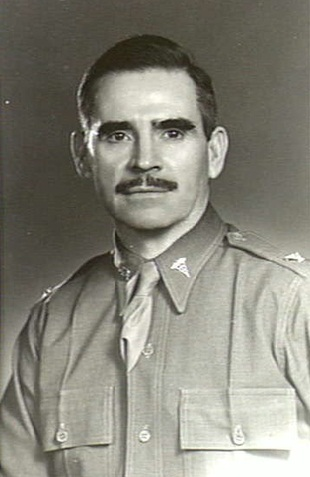
Colonel Percy J. Carroll, Chief Surgeon of the US Army Forces, Southwest Pacific Area

In February 1942, Colonel Percy J. Carroll, the Chief Surgeon of the US Army Forces, Southwest Pacific Area, found that he had problems integrating large 400 to 750-bed field and evacuation hospitals into troop flow as forces advanced because of the underdeveloped transportation infrastructure and terrain in the Southwest Pacific, particularly in Papua and New Guinea. This limited his ability to move hospitals closely forward behind advancing forces and support combat operations with effective, far-forward surgical care.

During the summer and fall of 1942, at Carroll's direction, a team of Medical Corps officers modified the basic War Department Table of Organization and Equipment (T/O&E) for a standard 25-bed station hospital (T/O&E 8-560, 22 July 1942) into a new theater table of organization and table of basic allowances (T/O, T/BA) (T/O 8-508-S-SWPA, 31 October 1942) for a portable hospital of 25 beds. The new unit was capable of supporting small units in its camp-type version (with 4 female Army nurses and organic vehicles) or battalion and regimental combat teams in its task force version (without the 4 nurses and organic vehicles). Commanded by a Medical Corps captain or major, the new 29-man portable hospital had four medical officers (three general surgeons and a general surgeon/anesthetist) and 25 enlisted men, including two surgical and 11 medical technicians. The PSH had to be flexible in nature and the hospitals consisted of what could be carried with the staff, in addition to their personal gear.

A radical departure was that all of the unit's equipment, medical and surgical supplies, and rations could weigh no more than the 29 men could personally transport. Designed to meet a specific problem at a specific point in time, the Portable Surgical Hospital had several shortcomings. First, the weight limitations meant that it lacked much of the equipment that it needed to conduct definitive surgery. Second, it lacked the capacity to hold patients for any length of time, which could often be called for by the tactical situation. Third, the assigned surgeons lacked the skills and experience necessary to meet the demands on the units, as Carroll often sent younger, less experienced surgeons forward, a departure from the Army's experience in World War I, which showed that less experienced surgeons should be kept at larger facilities to the rear, where they could operate under the tutelage of a more experienced senior staff surgeon. And, finally, the Portable Surgical Hospitals had been stripped so lean that they were never truly self-sufficient, and had to rely on other units for life-support.

The Mobile Army Surgical Hospital, developed after World War II, would address these concerns. One-hundred percent mobile with organic vehicles, with 60 beds and assigned nurses, and fully equipped and supplied to provide definitive care, the MASH built on the experiences of the PSHs of World War II.

== List of PSH ==
- 1st Portable Surgical Hospital
- 2nd Portable Surgical Hospital
- 3rd Portable Surgical Hospital
- 4th Portable Surgical Hospital
- 5th Portable Surgical Hospital
- 6th Portable Surgical Hospital
- 7th Portable Surgical Hospital
- 8th Portable Surgical Hospital
- 9th Portable Surgical Hospital
- 10th Portable Surgical Hospital
- 11th Portable Surgical Hospital
- 12th Portable Surgical Hospital
- 13th Portable Surgical Hospital
- 14th Portable Surgical Hospital
- 15th Portable Surgical Hospital
- 16th Portable Surgical Hospital
- 17th Portable Surgical Hospital
- 18th Portable Surgical Hospital
- 19th Portable Surgical Hospital
- 20th Portable Surgical Hospital
- 21st Portable Surgical Hospital
- 22nd Portable Surgical Hospital
- 23rd Portable Surgical Hospital
- 24th Portable Surgical Hospital
- 27th Portable Surgical Hospital
- 28th Portable Surgical Hospital
- 30th Portable Surgical Hospital
- 31st Portable Surgical Hospital
- 32nd Portable Surgical Hospital
- 33rd Portable Surgical Hospital
- 35th Portable Surgical Hospital
- 35th Portable Surgical Hospital
- 36th Portable Surgical Hospital
- 38th Portable Surgical Hospital
- 40th Portable Surgical Hospital
- 41st Portable Surgical Hospital
- 42nd Portable Surgical Hospital
- 43rd Portable Surgical Hospital
- 44th Portable Surgical Hospital
- 45th Portable Surgical Hospital
- 46th Portable Surgical Hospital
- 47th Portable Surgical Hospital
- 48th Portable Surgical Hospital
- 49th Portable Surgical Hospital
- 50th Portable Surgical Hospital
- 51st Portable Surgical Hospital
- 52nd Portable Surgical Hospital
- 53rd Portable Surgical Hospital
- 54th Portable Surgical Hospital
- 55th Portable Surgical Hospital
- 56th Portable Surgical Hospital
- 57th Portable Surgical Hospital
- 58th Portable Surgical Hospital
- 60th Portable Surgical Hospital
- 61st Portable Surgical Hospital
- 62nd Portable Surgical Hospital
- 63rd Portable Surgical Hospital
- 64th Portable Surgical Hospital
- 66th Portable Surgical Hospital
- 67th Portable Surgical Hospital
- 95th Portable Surgical Hospital
- 96th Portable Surgical Hospital
- 97th Portable Surgical Hospital
- 98th Portable Surgical Hospital

== See also ==
- List of former United States Army medical units
- Battalion Aid Stations
- Mobile Army Surgical Hospital
- Combat Support Hospital
