= United States Army Medical Corps =

Non-combat specialty branch of the U.S. Army Medical Department

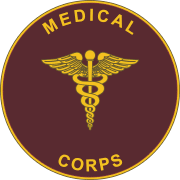
- The U.S. Army Medical Corps branch plaque, erroneously invoking the caduceus as a symbol of medicine
- Active: 1908–present
- Country: United States
- Branch: United States Army
- Type: Corps
- Website: Official website

Insignia
- Branch insignia

The Medical Corps (MC) of the United States Army is a staff corps (non-combat specialty branch) of the U.S. Army Medical Department (AMEDD) consisting of commissioned medical officers – physicians with either an M.D. or a D.O. degree, at least one year of post-graduate clinical training, and a state medical license.

The MC traces its earliest origins to the first physicians recruited by the Medical Department of the Army, created by the Second Continental Congress in 1775. The US Congress made official the designation "Medical Corps" in 1908, although the term had long been in use informally among the Medical Department's regular physicians.

Currently, the MC consists of over 4,400 active duty physicians representing all the specialties and subspecialties of civilian medicine. They may be assigned to fixed military medical facilities, to deployable combat units or to military medical research and development duties. They are considered fully deployable soldiers. The Chief of the Medical Corps Branch (under the Army's Human Resources Command) is a colonel and the senior-most Medical Corps officer in the Army is the U.S. Army surgeon general, a lieutenant general.

== History ==
=== Origins ===
Both the Army Medical Department and the Medical Corps trace their origins to 27 July 1775, when the Continental Congress established the first Army Hospital to be headed by a "Director General and Chief Physician". The language of the Congressional resolution spoke of "an Hospital" which in those days meant a hospital system or medical department. Among the accomplishments of Army surgeons during the years of the Revolution was completion (in 1778, at Lititz, Pennsylvania) of the first pharmacopoeia printed in America. In 1789, the Department of the Hospital was disbanded and a system of "Regimental Surgeons" was established in its place.

=== 19th century ===
The horseman in the foreground is an infantry surgeon in the uniform adopted in January 1812.

During the period that followed (1789–1818) Congress provided for a medical organization for the Army only in time of war or emergency. For example, in 1812 Congress established the Medical Department of the Northern Army as a response to the need for medical support during operations in the War of 1812. In 1816, medical officers were given uniforms (but not military rank) for the first time. A permanent and continuous Medical Department was not established until 1818. That year a "Surgeon General" was appointed (Joseph Lovell, the first to hold that specific title) and since then a succession of Surgeons General and a permanent Corps organization in the Army Medical Department have followed. Physicians assigned to the U.S. Army were finally accorded military rank in 1847, although the old Regimental Surgeon system of additional designations ("Assistant Surgeon", "Surgeon") was also retained until 1908.

In 1862, Surgeon General William Alexander Hammond proposed establishment of an "Army Medical School" in which medical cadets and others seeking admission to the MC could receive such post-graduate instruction as would better fit them for military commissions. It was over 30 years, however, before Surgeon General George M. Sternberg would found (1893) the Army Medical School (AMS), the precursor institution to today's Walter Reed Army Institute of Research.

=== 20th century ===
Congress made official the designation "Medical Corps" in 1908, although the term had long been in use informally among the Medical Department's regular physicians.

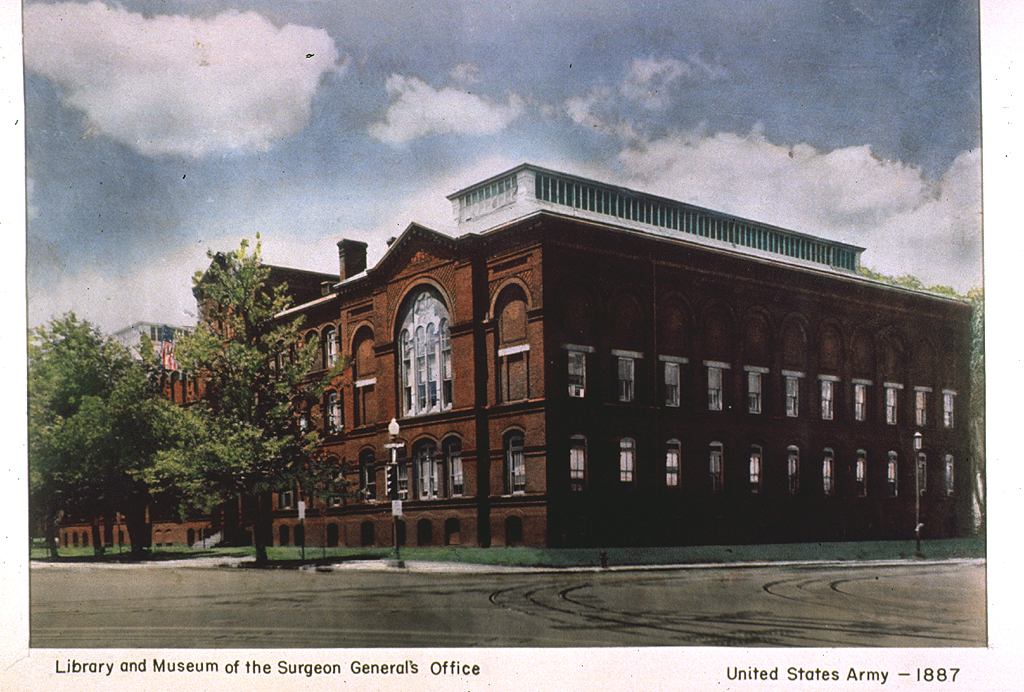
The Army Medical School was housed in the Army Medical Museum and Library building in Washington, DC, between 1893 and 1910.

World War I brought a realization of the need to provide more than the "finishing school" approach of the AMS to military medical education and indoctrination and in 1920, the Medical Department first established hospital internships as a method of acquiring new officers for the MC. Meanwhile, part of the role of the AMS (which would become part of the Army Medical Center in 1923) was taken over by the new Medical Field Service School which opened at Carlisle Barracks, Pennsylvania in 1921. Its purpose was to train both new medical officers and newly enlisted medics in the practice of field medicine. (This school was transferred to Texas in 1946, became the Academy of Health Sciences in 1973, and became the AMEDD Center & School in 1991).

The first woman to receive a Regular Army commission in the MC was Major Margaret D. Craighill in 1943. She was assigned as Chief Surgeon to the Women's Army Corps. In 1946, Army residency programs for MC officers were introduced into the Medical Department, providing for the first time the full spectrum of graduate medical education (GME) to prospective MC officers. In 1954, a prominent thoracic surgeon and Harvard graduate, Frank Berry, was appointed as the second Assistant Secretary of Defense (Health Affairs). Upon assuming office one of his first acts was to propose a plan for young military physicians to follow one of three pathways after completing their internship:

1. Enter the armed services immediately and return to their residencies after fulfilling their obligated service;
2. Enter the armed services two years after medical school and complete their residencies after service;
3. Enter the service after the completion of residency training.

The "Berry Plan" deferred doctors who were taking their residency, so that the Army would get the benefit of their advanced education. Eventually, GME became both a recruiting and a retention tool for the AMEDD, and board-certified specialists were attracted in steady numbers. Those MC officers who did not elect Option 1, or who were not needed immediately, were "deferred." Some were allowed Option 3, to complete their residency training and then entered active duty as a fully trained specialist. Those who were deferred for only one year of residency were termed "partially trained specialists" and were usually given military assignments that allowed them to work within their specialty. Many residency programs would give a year's credit toward completion of residency for their time in military service to physicians who served under Option 2. (This triple option program continued for 19 years until the US military draft ended in 1973.)

During the Vietnam era, serious physician shortfalls were experienced by the Defense Department and it was at this time (1966) that osteopathic physicians, who had previously been excluded from active military service, were first admitted to the MC. To avoid reinstating another "doctor draft", the US Congress took steps to encourage medical students to enter the military as physicians. Completing this trend, medical school training has been provided for military students since the Uniformed Services University of the Health Sciences (USUHS) was established in 1972, graduating its first class in 1980. USUHS is the United States' center for military medical education. Its primary mission is to prepare its graduates for service in the medical corps of all the uniformed services of the country. Eventually, USUHS graduates made up about 25% of all doctors in the military. (Now it graduates about 164 physicians each year; around 90% of all USUHS graduates remain on active duty until reaching retirement eligibility.) By the mid-1990s, the strength of the Army's MC had risen to about 5,400 active duty officers, but cutbacks soon ensued.

=== 21st century ===
As of mid-2008, the number of active duty doctors serving in the MC nearly met the requirement of 4,448 authorized positions. Primary care specialties represented the greatest shortfall in endstrength numbers.

== Career management ==
As with all Army officers, the military occupational specialty (MOS) classification system provides the MC officer with his/her officer branch, area of concentration (AOC), branch skill code (degree of proficiency), special qualifications identifiers (SQIs), additional skill identifiers (ASIs), language identification, and reporting classifications. The MC is one of the Special Branches of the Army, and thus is not classified as a Basic Branch. Special Branches are a grouping of branches and officers primarily concerned with providing combat service support and/or administration to the Army as a whole, but managed separately from USAHRC combat service support branches. (Other Special Branches are the Army Chaplains and the Judge Advocate General.)

=== Entry ===
The most common source of new physicians for the Army are medical students attending civilian medical schools and participating in the Health Professions Scholarship Program (HPSP). By so participating they have their expenses paid for them and incur a four-year service obligation. A smaller number graduate from the Uniformed Services University of the Health Sciences (USUHS) in Bethesda, Maryland and serve on active duty (as second lieutenants) while students, incurring a seven-year obligation. Some MC officers are accessed via direct commission after completion of specialty or sub-specialty training before entry on active duty.

=== US Army MC specialties ===
The MC consists of 41 areas of concentration (AOC) within officer branches 60, 61 and 62. A young MC officer typically starts out as a general medical officer (AOC 62B) following completion of the first year of graduate medical education (GME). They may later specialize following completion of residency training in a military (or less often, civilian) program. Later, these physicians may continue with subspecialty training or continue in operational positions providing clinical care, conducting research, or in other positions.

The 41 AOC identifiers for the US Army MC are:

- 60A Operational Medicine
- 60B Nuclear Medicine Officer
- 60C Preventive Medicine Officer
- 60D Occupational Medicine Officer
- 60F Pulmonary Disease/Critical Care Officer
- 60G Gastroenterologist
- 60H Cardiologist
- 60J Obstetrician and Gynecologist
- 60K Urologist
- 60L Dermatologist
- 60M Allergist, Clinical Immunologist
- 60N Anesthesiologist
- 60P Pediatrician
- 60Q Pediatric Sub-Specialist
- 60R Child Neurologist
- 60S Ophthalmologist
- 60T Otolaryngologist
- 60U Child Psychiatrist
- 60V Neurologist
- 60W Psychiatrist
- 61A Nephrologist
- 61B Medical Oncologist/Hematologist
- 61C Endocrinologist
- 61D Rheumatologist
- 61E Clinical Pharmacologist
- 61F Internist
- 61G Infectious disease Officer
- 61H Family Medicine
- 61J General Surgeon
- 61K Thoracic Surgeon
- 61L Plastic Surgeon
- 61M Orthopedic Surgeon
- 61N Flight Surgeon/Aerospace medicine specialist
- 61P Physiatrist
- 61Q Radiation Oncologist
- 61R Diagnostic Radiologist
- 61U Pathologist
- 61W Peripheral Vascular Surgeon
- 61Z Neurosurgeon
- 62A Emergency Physician
- 62B Field Surgeon/Battalion Surgeon/General Medical Officer

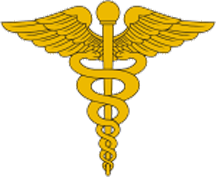
The traditional U.S. Army version of the caduceus. The 1902 adoption of this ancient symbol of the Greek god Hermes for U.S. Army medical officer uniforms popularized it throughout the world.

The branch skill codes ("degree of proficiency" designators) for the US Army MC are:

- Medical proficiency 9A—Determination is on a basis of individual merit by TSG's Classification Board.
- Medical proficiency 9B—Certification by the American Board of Medical Specialties (ABMS) in a particular specialty or subspecialty.
- Medical proficiency 9C—Completion of formal subspecialty training to meet the ABMS requirement of an approved residency or fellowship in a recognized teaching center.
- Medical proficiency 9D—Successful completion of the first year (internship) of an approved GME training program.
- Medical proficiency 9E—Intern in an approved first year GME training program which, upon successful completion, will result in the Medical Proficiency of 9D. While an intern, the officer will be awarded the AOC specialty in which he/she is training with the medical proficiency skill identifier of 9E.
- Medical proficiency 9F—Fellow in an approved fellowship GME training program.

The branch skill code is appended to the MC officer's AOC. For example, "60H9C" designates a board-eligible, but not yet board-certified, Army cardiologist.

=== Licensures, boards, credentials, and special pays ===
All Army MC officers are required to hold a state medical license in at least one U.S. state and to fulfill all requirements necessary for maintaining it. (No federal physician holds a "federal medical license" to practice.) Younger MC officers are typically not boarded as they have not yet taken specialty training, but as they advance in their careers, board-certification becomes a virtual necessity for promotion to the rank of lieutenant colonel and higher. The Army's Surgeon General maintains a Central Credentials Quality Assurance System (CCQAS) in which practitioner credentials files are monitored and validated at the local medical treatment facility (MTF) level. In addition to the basic pay and allowances available to all officers, a continuation pay program and a variety of bonuses and entitlements under the Officer Special Pay Program keep Army physician pay competitive with civilian practitioners and allow for voluntary physician retention in the active force. The continuation pay program is tied directly to the maintenance of a state license and a board-certification bonus encourages MC officers to maintain active board certification by taking a re-certification exam every 10 years. Specialty pays incentivize the various specialties and sub-specialties with sliding rates and a variety of contracts (generally 2, 3, or 4 years) are available after any basic educational obligation has been fulfilled.

=== Career assignment fields ===
U.S. Army physicians serve in one of three general career fields that are not formal parts of the MOS classification system:

Operational Medicine is the field of Army medicine that provides medical support to the Soldier and his/her Chain of Command. Many Operational Physicians serve as Division, Brigade and Battalion level Surgeons (the word "surgeon" is used to identify a physician that is assigned to a unit as a primary care provider and not necessarily as a General Surgeon). These Physicians are either assigned through the PROFIS (Professional Filler System) or through permanent assignment (PCS). Deployments with units to combat theaters are for the duration of a deployment and the jobs are mostly filled by primary care physicians. A PROFIS provider can expect to be deployed away from their family for a total of 16 months (1 month before deployment, 12 months in theater, and 3 months for "stabilization" after return to the assigned units home station). This means that primary care physicians are deployed for longer periods than most specialist Physicians. A specialist (ie..General Surgeon, Trauma Surgeon, Rheumatologist) will usually be deployed for 6 months. Operational Physicians should expect that greater than 60% of their time will be spent in administrative roles and non-patient care. 40% of the Operational providers time is spent caring for Soldiers or supervising unit Physician Assistants(PAs). With the recent BCT (Brigade Combat Team) restructuring, the demand for Operational Surgeons have increased. Likely, the poor retention of Captains and junior Major Physicians in the primary care fields is due to the relative inequality of deployment length and deployment frequency.

Clinical Medicine is the field of Army medicine where a Physician in uniform basically functions like a Physician in the Civilian arena. These Physicians are assigned to the various Army MEDCENs (Medical Centers) and MEDDACs (Medical Department Activities, i.e., hospitals and clinics). Each of these Physicians are assigned to a PROFIS unit. Usually primary care physicians deploy to fill Battalion level Surgeon positions. Medical Specialists deploy to support CSH (combat support hospitals).

Research Medicine is filled by the minority of military physicians. Most of these research Physicians are based in larger Army Medical Centers.

== See also ==
- U.S. Army Medical Command (MEDCOM)
- United States Army Medical Department Museum
- United States Navy Medical Corps
- United States Air Force Medical Corps
