= 10th Field Hospital =

Coordinates: 38.7387°N 104.7870°W

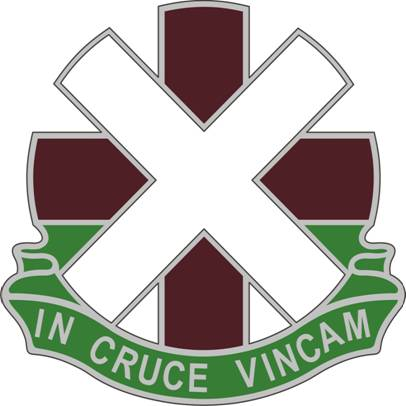
- Active: 16 June 2017 – current
- Country: United States of America
- Branch: Regular Army
- Type: Field Hospital
- Garrison/HQ: Fort Carson
- Nickname: Mountain Medics (special designation)
- Mottos: In Cruce Vincam ("I shall conquer in the cross")
- Engagements: World War II; Operation Desert Shield; Operation Desert Storm; Iraq War; Operation Enduring Freedom; Operation Inherent Resolve

Commanders
- Current commander: Lt Col Chad Vermillion
- Notable commanders: MG Dennis Doyle

The 10th Field Hospital ("Mountain Medics") is a Field Hospital of the United States Army first constituted on 23 June 1942 in the Army of the United States as the 10th Field Hospital.

== Lineage ==
- Constituted 23 June 1942 in the Regular Army as 10th Field Hospital
- Activated on 6 July 1942 at Camp Bowie, Texas
- Inactivated on 4 November 1945 at Camp Myles Standish, Massachusetts.
- Reactivated on 25 August 1949 in Germany before being allotted on 5 May 1951 to the Regular Army.
- Reorganized and redesignated on 15 June 1962 as the 10th Evacuation Hospital
- Inactivated on 16 August 1965 in Germany.
- Reactivated on 12 July 1967 at Fort George G. Meade, Maryland.
- Reorganized and redesignated on 21 March 1973 as the 10th Combat Support Hospital
- Reorganized and redesignated on 16 August 1983 as the 10th Mobile Army Surgical Hospital
- Reorganized and redesignated on 16 December 1992 as the 10th Combat Support Hospital.
- Reorganized and redesignated on 16 June 2017 as the 10th Field Hospital

== Mission ==
The mission of the 10th Field Hospital was to provide hospitalization support to U.S. Forces within the theater of operation in support of combat operations or operations other than war. The 10th Field Hospital provided medical support for the Fort Carson Community, operated two troop medical clinics, provided support personnel to Evans Army Community Hospital, supported EMT course, conducted combat lifesaver courses and preventive medicine courses, and conducted the installation's Expert Field Medical Badge test.

== History ==
=== World War II and Postwar Service ===
The 10th Field Hospital provided medical support in Tunisia, Italy, France, and Germany. It was awarded two Arrowhead Devices for participation in theses campaigns. Additionally, the unit was also awarded the Army Meritorious Unit Commendation on 16 April 1990, for services in the European Theater during 1944.

Although inactivated after returning to the US following the defeat of the Axis Powers, the 10th Field Hospital was reactivated in the regular Army on 5 August 1949, then redesignated as the 10th Evacuation Hospital 15 June 1962. It resumed its medical support and training mission in Germany, until its inactivation 16 August 1965.

The 10th Evacuation Hospital was reactivated 12 July 1967, at Fort Meade, Maryland. It was reorganized and redesignated as a Combat Support Hospital on 21 March 1973.

=== Reorganization as a Mobile Army Surgical Hospital ===
On 16 August 1983 the unit was redesignated as the 10th Mobile Army Surgical Hospital (MASH). On 5 August 1987, the Department of the Army directed a realignment of the 10th MASH with the 4th Infantry Division (Mechanized), with an effective date of 16 August 1988. The 10th MASH was under the 43rd Support Group as a battalion organization with the 517th Medical Company (Clearing), 571st Medical Detachment (Air Ambulance), 223rd Medical Detachment (Preventive Medicine) and 40th Dental Company as subordinate units.

On 3 Jan. 1991, the 10th MASH deployed to Saudi Arabia with the 44th Medical Brigade, 1st Medical Group in support of Operation Desert Storm until July 1991.

=== Second Reorganization as a Combat Support Hospital ===
The Department of the Army redesignated the 10th MASH as the 10th Combat Support Hospital 16 Dec. 1992. The 10th CSH (FWD) deployed to Bosnia and Hungary in support of Operation Joint Forge from 12 March to 27 Sept. 1999.

The 10th CSH was a modular-designed facility, which consisted of a HUB (Hospital Unit Base) and HUS (Hospital Unit Surgical). The unit had 8 wards providing intensive nursing care for up to 96 patients, 7 wards providing intermediate nursing care for up to 140 patients, one ward providing neuropsychiatric (NP) care for up to 20 patients. Surgical capacity was based on 8 operating room tables for a surgical capacity of 144 operating room (OR) table hours per day. The unit could be further augmented with specialty surgical/medical teams to increase its capabilities.

The hospital was equipped with Deployable Medical System (DEPMEDS) equipment, which could be set up in various configurations. The major components of a combat support hospital were the expandable tactical shelters, TEMPER Tents, and the military vans. The expandable tactical shelter was a rigid paneled metal unit that could be unfolded to become an enclosed air conditioned shelter for use as an operating room, central material services, pharmacy, laboratory, blood bank, radiology, or biomedical maintenance. The TEMPER (Tent Extendible Modular Personnel) tent featured an aluminum frame and fabric outer skin, which could be quickly assembled and disassembled without, tools. The standard ward was 20 feet by 64 feet, consisting of 8 8-by-20-foot TEMPER sections. The MILVAN was a rigid paneled metal storage and transportation container, which was allocated to the functional sections of the hospital. When operational, the combat support hospital could provide climate and environmental control equivalent to that found in any fixed hospital.

In January 2004, the 10th CSH became the first hospital to complete the Medical Re-engineering Initiative (MRI) conversion. With the conversion, the 10th CSH was a more mobile 84-bed hospital with an additional 164 beds in storage, if ever needed. The combat support hospital was designed to provide level III care to deployed soldiers during wartime operations or humanitarian missions. The hospital facility was the Deployable Medical System (DEPMEDS), which consisted of TEMPER tents and ISO shelters. It was composed of an emergency medical treatment section with a dispensary, one operating room (with 2 tables), 2 intensive care units (ICU) each composed of 12 beds, 3 intermediate care wards (ICW) each composed of 20 beds, one central materiel services section, laboratory with limited testing capabilities, blood bank, radiology with portable x-ray capability and digital processing, and a pharmacy. Experiences of the 10th Field Hospital had led it to request an additional OR iso-shelter to increase its surgical capabilities. Though the 10th CSH was an echelon-above-division (EAD) asset, and therefore required support, with the MRI conversion it was more self-sufficient than before.

=== Service in Iraq ===
The 10th CSH deployed in support of Operation Iraqi Freedom 2005–2007. While conducting split-based operations in Tallil and Baghdad, Medical Task Force 10 provided Level III combat health support with a 94-percent survivability rate. The unit returned to Fort Carson from Iraq 14 Oct. 2006, and received an additional Meritorious Unit Commendation.

The 10th CSH deployed as Medical Task Force 10 to Operation Iraqi Freedom 08–10, and once again provided Level III combat health support with split-based operations in Baghdad at Ibn Sina Hospital then moving to Camp Sather, Tallil, Al Kut, Al Amarah, Bucca, and even supporting UK Forces in Basrah. The unit achieved a 98-percent survivability rate, the highest survivability rate in the history of American warfare.

The staff of the hospital consisted of two personnel components: permanently assigned and professional fillers or PROFIS. Under the FY07 MTOE, which appeared on 16 March 2007, the 10th Combat Support Hospital had 482 required positions, which consisted of 237 permanently assigned and 245 PROFIS. With the MRI conversion, this represented a shift with the number of permanently assigned personnel decreasing and the number of PROFIS increasing by approximately 40 each respectively. The backbone of a fully operational and functional hospital was the competent staff found under the canvas. An important part of that competent team was the PROFIS staff, which made up over half of the total staff and included the majority of the clinical professionals.

In an ideal world, the 10th Field Hospital would have had all personnel assigned and training on a daily basis in anticipation for worldwide deployments. Unfortunately, that arrangement would become a detriment to the clinical skills of the medical, nursing, and specialty staff. Therefore, a system was required whereby the majority of time could be spent in a real clinical environment, where skills could be developed and maintained. That system, the PROFIS program, allowed clinical staff to maintain clinical proficiency while developing unit relationships and training for deployment with their designated PROFIS unit. Likened to a "break glass when needed" piece of equipment, PROFIS were assigned to the 10th Field Hospital on paper and were requested when the need arose for professionals to round out the staffing requirements for a particular mission.

=== Transition to 10th Field Hospital ===
Today, the 10th Field Hospital, on order, prepares for expeditionary deployment in order to provide Role III hospitalization, outpatient services, enhanced medical, surgical, laboratory and x-ray capabilities and provides sustainment support to hospital augmentation detachments in support of Unified Land Operations. The 148-bed Field Hospital consists of Headquarters and Headquarters Company (32-bed), 84th Hospital Augmentation Detachment (32-bed MED), 193rd Hospital Augmentation Detachment (60-bed ICW) and 534th Hospital Augmentation Detachment (24-bed SURG) The 10th FH is a force multiplier for the combatant commander, providing high quality, comprehensive role III medical care and health services in order to conserve the fighting strength".

=== 2020 Coronavirus Pandemic ===
On 28 March, the Port of Seattle and the Northwest Seaport Alliance made plans to make sections of Terminal 46 available for trailers, container equipment and storage needs in support of the 10th Field Hospital (deployed under its usual headquarters the 627th Hospital Centre) being set up at CenturyLink Field, Seattle. The 10th Field Hospital returned to Fort Carson after completing its mission on 16 April 2020.

== Honors ==
=== Unit decorations ===
Ribbon	Award	Year	Notes
	Meritorious Unit Commendation (Army)	1944	for service in the European Theater
