= Army Medical Department =

Army Medical Department may refer to:

- Army Medical Department of the British Army, forerunner to the Royal Army Medical Corps
- Army Medical Department (United States)
