= Field hospital =

Temporary hospital or mobile medical unit that handles on-site casualties

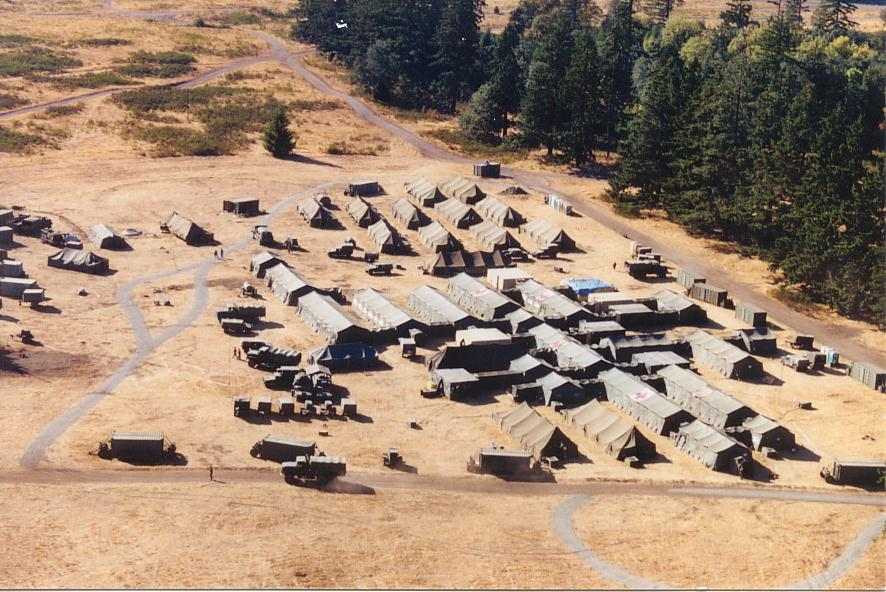
A U.S. Army Combat Support Hospital, a type of field hospital, in 2000

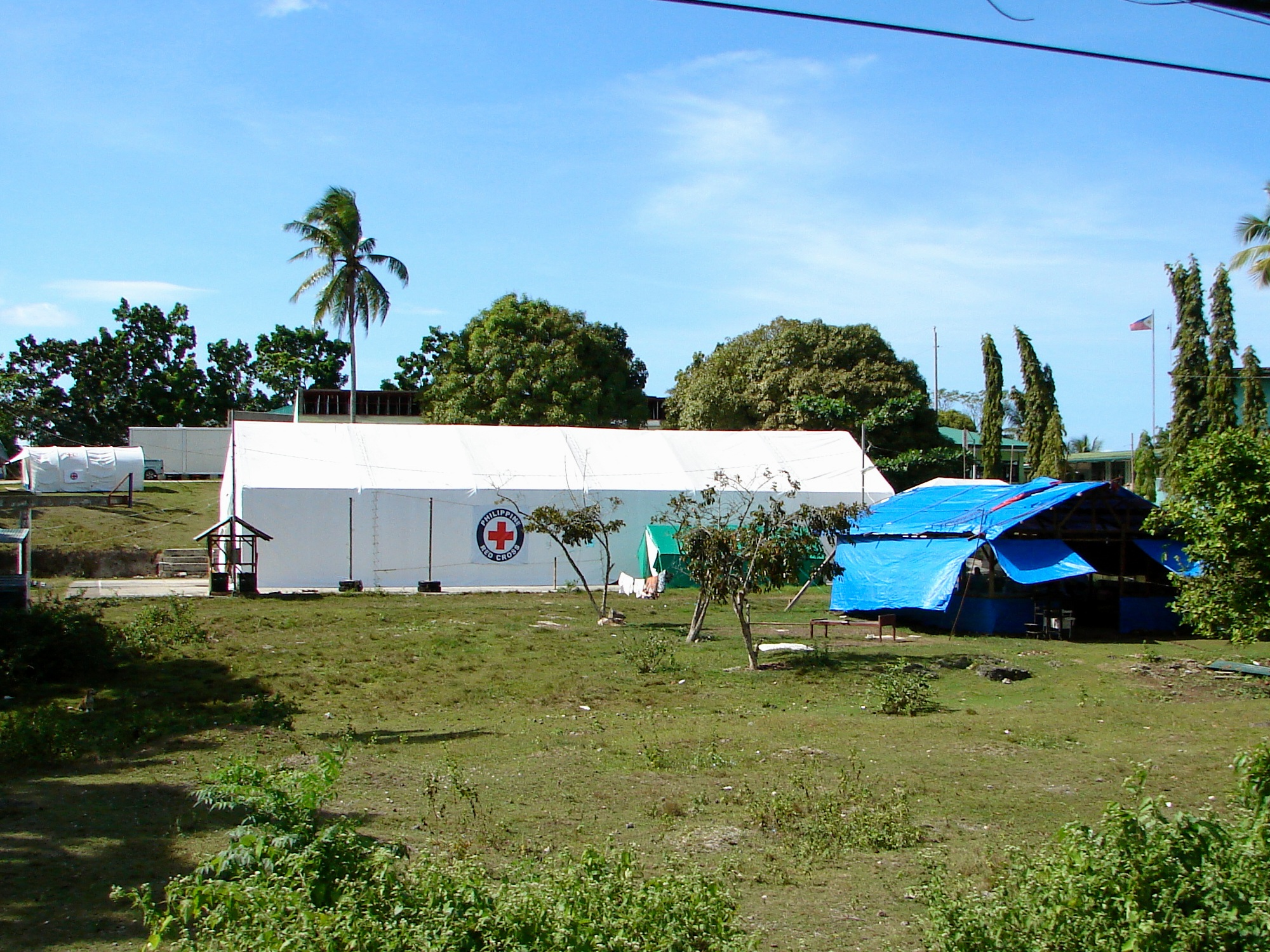
Red Cross field hospital set up after earthquake in the Philippines

A field hospital is a temporary hospital or mobile medical unit that takes care of casualties on-site before they can be safely transported to more permanent facilities. This term was initially used in military medicine but it has also been used to describe alternate care sites used in disasters and other emergency situations.

A field hospital is a medical staff with a mobile medical kit and, often, a wide tent-like shelter (at times an inflatable structure in modern usage) so that it can be readily set up near the source of casualties. In an urban environment, the field hospital is often established in an easily accessible and highly visible building (such as restaurants, schools, hotels and so on). In the case of an airborne structure, the mobile medical kit is often placed in a normalized container; the container itself is then used as shelter. A field hospital is generally larger than a temporary aid station but smaller than a permanent military hospital.

International humanitarian law such as the Geneva Conventions include prohibitions on attacking doctors, ambulances, hospital ships, or field hospitals buildings displaying a Red Cross, a Red Crescent or other emblem related to the International Red Cross and Red Crescent Movement; deliberately attacking or otherwise causing harm on these health facilities (especially during warfare or armed conflicts) may constitute a war crime or crimes against humanity.

Field hospitals are also prevalent in the event of disease outbreaks and pandemics. The most recent pandemic, COVID-19, has led to the establishment of field hospitals in many parts of the world, especially in the developing world.

== By country ==
=== France ===
Field hospitals in France are managed by the SAMU (French emergency medical service). Two types of mobile medical kits (poste sanitaire mobile or PSM) are used:

- The level one mobile medical kit (PSM1): it can handle 25 heavy casualties on any type of ground; it is made of about 400 kg (880 lb) of equipment and drugs placed in 10 tanks, with also logistic equipment (trailer, inflatable tent, lighting, generating unit); there are 42 PSM1 in France;
- The level two mobile medical kit (PSM2): it can handle resuscitation care for 500 patients; it is made of 8 tons of equipment and drugs (200 references) in 150 tanks, it can be divided (is possible to set up several sub-fraced PSM2); in addition to the usual logistic equipment of the PSM1, the PSM2 has a tactical radio network and a management computer system. There are 21 PSM2 in France.

The PSM are stored in the hospitals where there are samus and smurs.

The PMA is organized in four zones:

- a reception and triage zone, under the responsibility of a sort physician; the casualties are sorted and dispatched according to the seriousness of their state;
- two zones for medical care:
  - Absolute emergencies zone (UA: urgences absolues): prehospital resuscitation unit for very serious cases: extreme emergencies (EU: extrème urgence) and grave injuries (U1);
  - Relative emergencies zone (UR: urgences relatives): for the serious (U2) and light injured (U3)
- Mortuary zone (dépot mortuaire) for the deceased casualties. This zone is under the responsibility of the judicial police.

In case of really massive disaster, it is possible to have several PMA; the evacuation goes then not directly to a hospital, but to another big field hospital called "medical evacuation centre" (centre médical d'évacuation, CME), to avoid the saturation of the hospitals.

In case of a red plan, the PMA is under the responsibility of a physician chosen by the director of medical rescue (DSM), and he is assisted by a firefighter officer chosen by the commander of rescue operation (COS). The firefighter officer has in charge the identification of the living casualties and of the secretaryship. The aim of the PMA is to sort and stabilize the casualties before their evacuation to a hospital.

A similar system can be set up as a preventive measure for some very big events (sport championship, cultural events, concert...), but managed by first aid associations. It is then called an "associative medical post" (poste associatif médicalisé, PAM). (For smaller events, is simple first aid post, with only volunteer certified first responders and no medical staff, is set up.)

The civil defence military units (Unité d'instruction et d'intervention de la sécurité civile, UIISC) have airborne field hospitals. The general system is called DICA (détachement d'intervention de catastrophe aéroporté, i.e. airborne disaster unit), and is specialized in search-and-rescue and in emergency medicine; it can be enhanced by the Fast civil defence medical unit, called ESCRIM (élément de sécurité civile rapide d'intervention médicale). The ESCRIM is a surgical unit (detachement d'appui chirurgical) assisted by a medical assistance unit (DAMHo, détachement d'appui médical et d'hospitalisation); the later is specialized in pre- and post-operation care, and allows 48h of hospitalization. The UIISC also has a PMA (i.e. sort, stabilization and evacuation structure) when the hospital infrastructure of the country is sufficient.

=== Namibia ===
The Namibian Defence Force operates a mobile field hospital through its Defence Health Services Directorate. It was donated by the German government to Namibia in March 2013. Initially it was a UN level two hospital but has now been upgraded to level one. The field hospital is containerized in tents, it has capacity to treat forty outpatients per day and has an admission capacity of twenty patients. It has two intensive care units, laboratories, an X-ray unit and a mobile oxygen concentrator. The dental department can treat 20 and four operations can be carried out daily. It has its own mobile logistics support wing consisting of kitchens, water purifiers, water tanks, toilet and shower containers, generators and sewage and refuse disposal facilities.

During the COVID-19 pandemic the hospital was deployed to Hosea Kutako International Airport to aid the country's response.

=== United Kingdom ===
Medical services in the British armed services date from the formation of the Standing Regular Army after the Restoration of Charles II in 1660. Prior to this, from as early as the 13th century there are records of surgeons and physicians being appointed by the English army to attend in times of war. Field hospitals are now provided by the Royal Army Medical Corps (Royal Army Medical Service as from November 2024).

=== United States ===
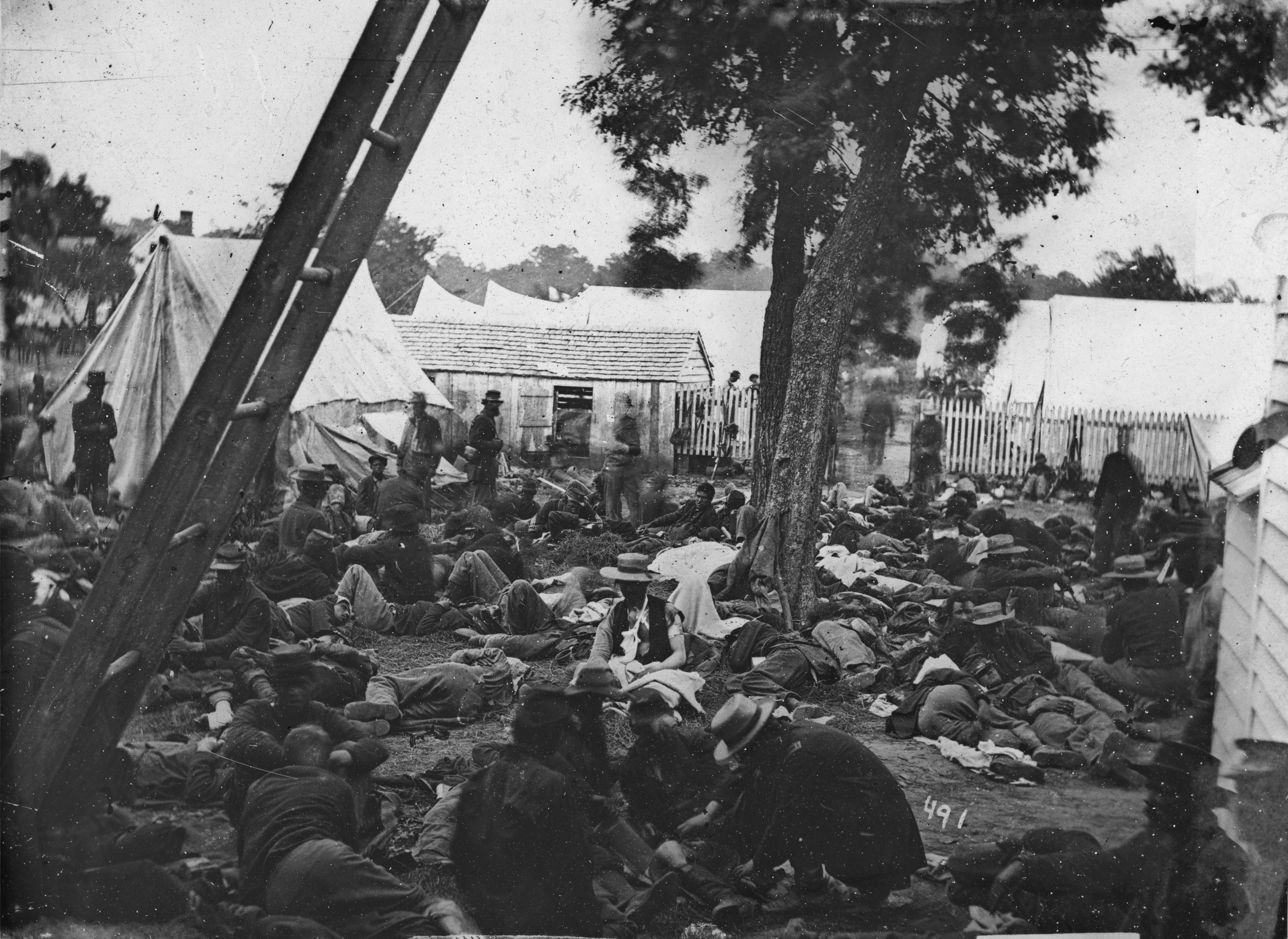
Field hospital after the Battle of Savage's Station (1862)

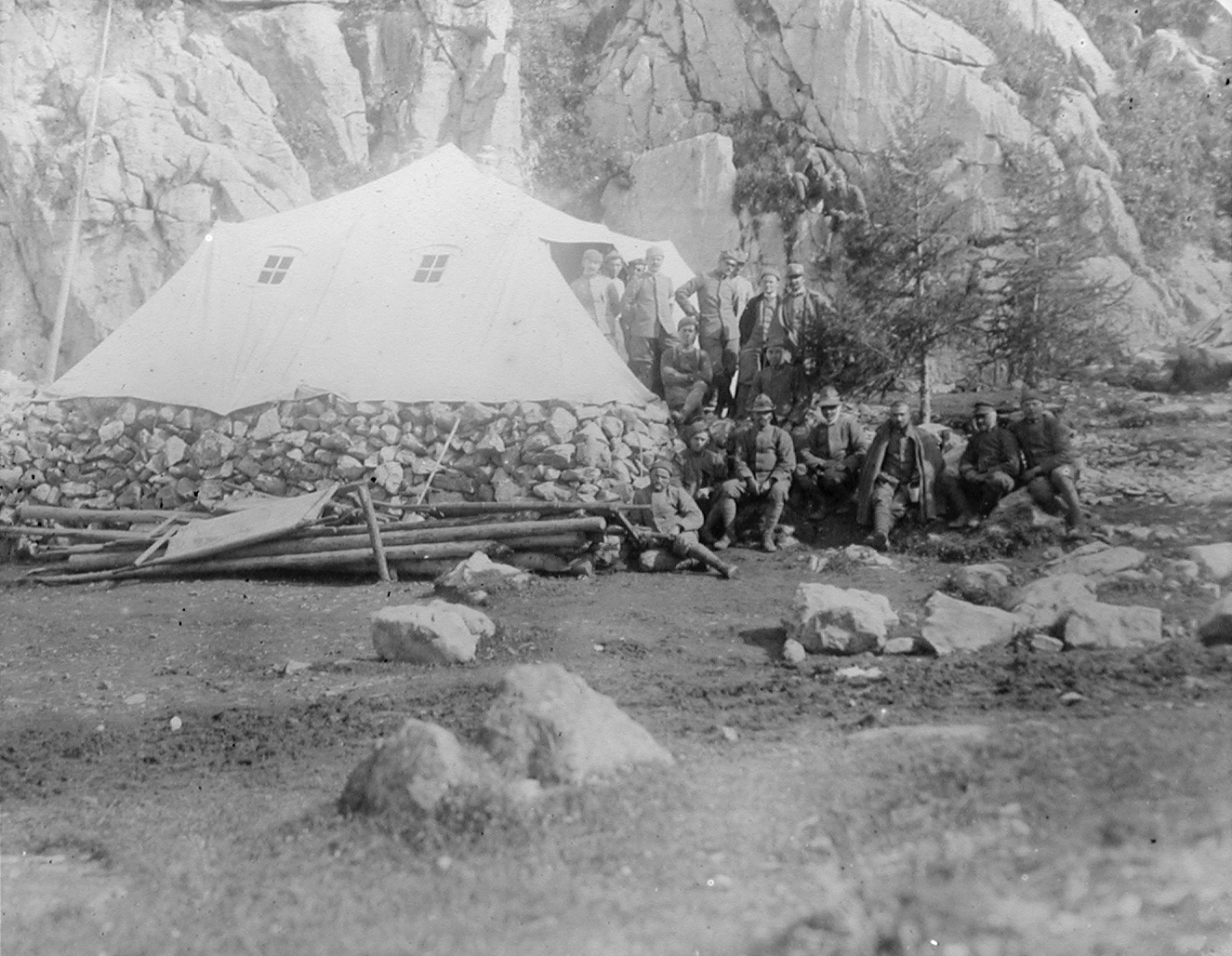
Italian Army field hospital on the Italian Front during World War I

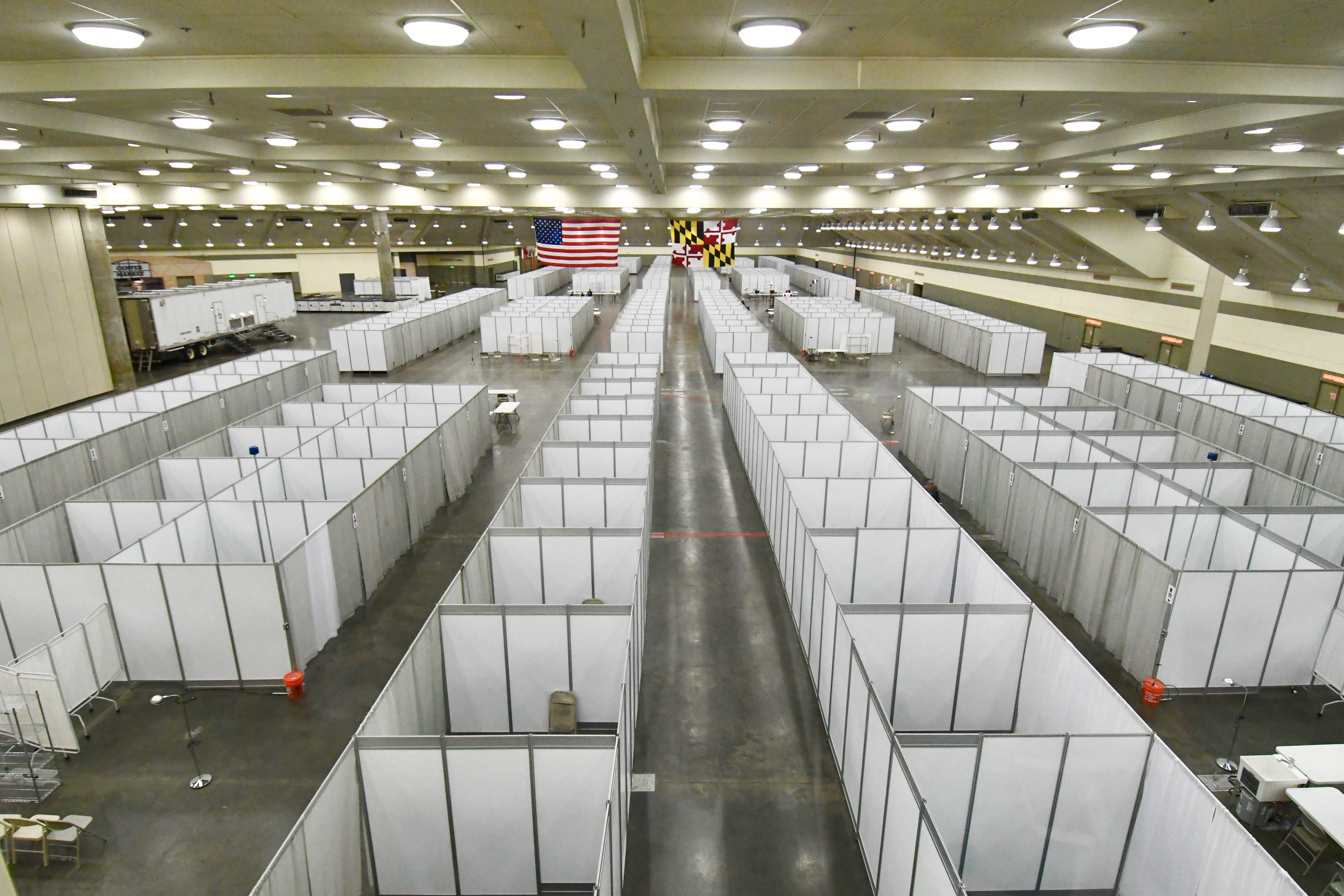
Early in the COVID-19 pandemic, convention centers were deemed to be ideal sites for field hospitals due to their existing infrastructure (electrical, water, sewage). Hotels and dormitories were also considered appropriate because they can use negative pressure technology.

In the United States Army Medical Department, the term "field hospital" is used as a generic term for a deployable medical facility. However, from 1906 to the present, with small interruptions, the department has had specific organized units called "Field Hospitals." These numbered units, for example the 10th Field Hospital, have specific tables of organization and equipment, capabilities, and doctrine for their employment, all of which have varied over time. Readers should take care not to confuse the generic American field hospital with a specific numbered XXth Field Hospital, as the two cannot be used interchangeably. An Evacuation Hospital, a Mobile Army Surgical Hospital (MASH), a Combat support hospital (CSH), a Field Hospital and a numbered General Hospital are all field hospitals—but a MASH, CSH, a General Hospital or a Field Hospital are not interchangeable.

In the United States Navy Bureau of Medicine and Surgery (BUMED), the counterpart to the Army's "field hospital" is known as an "Expeditionary Medical Facility" (EMF). The EMF is principally focused on support to Marines during expeditionary amphibious operations ashore, the Marine Corps having no medical personnel of their own and relying on the Navy for medical support. EMFs will also support Navy Construction Battalions (SeaBees) ashore. While the Navy has a small number of dedicated hospital ships and larger combatant vessels such as aircraft carriers and large deck amphibious assault ships have robust medical facilities, the utility of those afloat platforms decreases the further inland that the Marines progress. A smaller and more mobile version of the EMF is the Expeditionary Medical Unit (EMU).

=== Switzerland ===
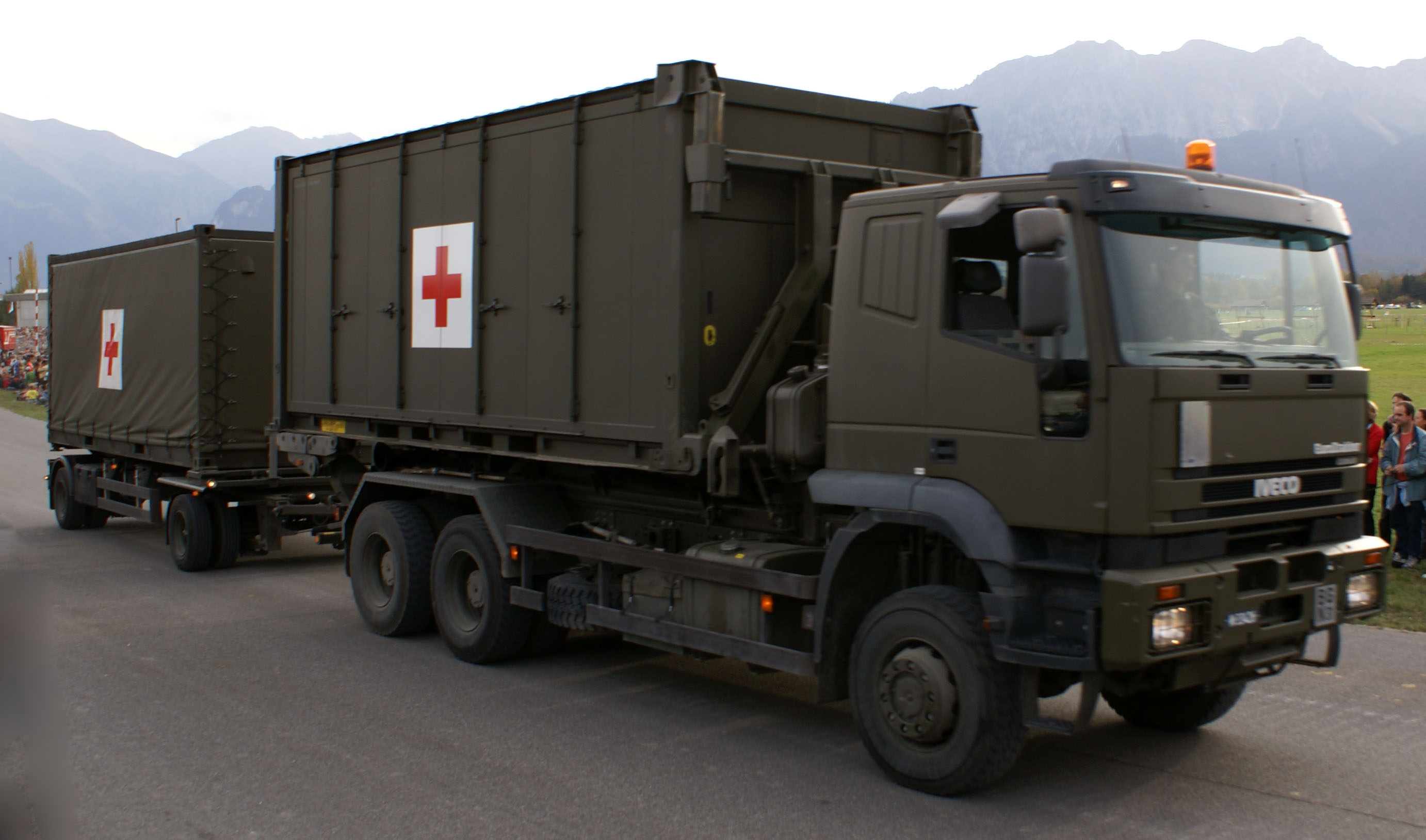
Transport truck of the Swiss Army with field hospital in cargo module

During the COVID-19 pandemic, the Swiss Armed Forces were mobilised to support civil hospitals in Switzerland. Similar measures were taken in other countries.

=== Bangladesh ===
Bangladesh Field Hospital (Popularly known as Bangladesh Hospital) was a temporary medical centre under the Sector-2 during the Liberation War of Bangladesh in 1971. The hospital was an initiative of Captain Akhtar Ahmed, who was a physician of 4th East Bengal Regiment in Comilla Cantonment. It was situated in Tripura, India.

During the COVID-19 pandemic, the young physician Dr. Bidduth Barua established Chattogram Field Hospital which is the first post-liberation field hospital in Bangladesh to provide medical services to COVID-19 patients of Covid-19. On April 21 2020, the hospital officially started medical services.. A team of doctors, nurses and Young Volunteer are providing services in this hospital under the leadership of Dr. Bidduth Barua. Originally complete with Covid-19 patients In addition to providing free services, other patients are also being served here. Although fever, cold, sneeze and cough are predominant in patients, any patient can avail free services from here.

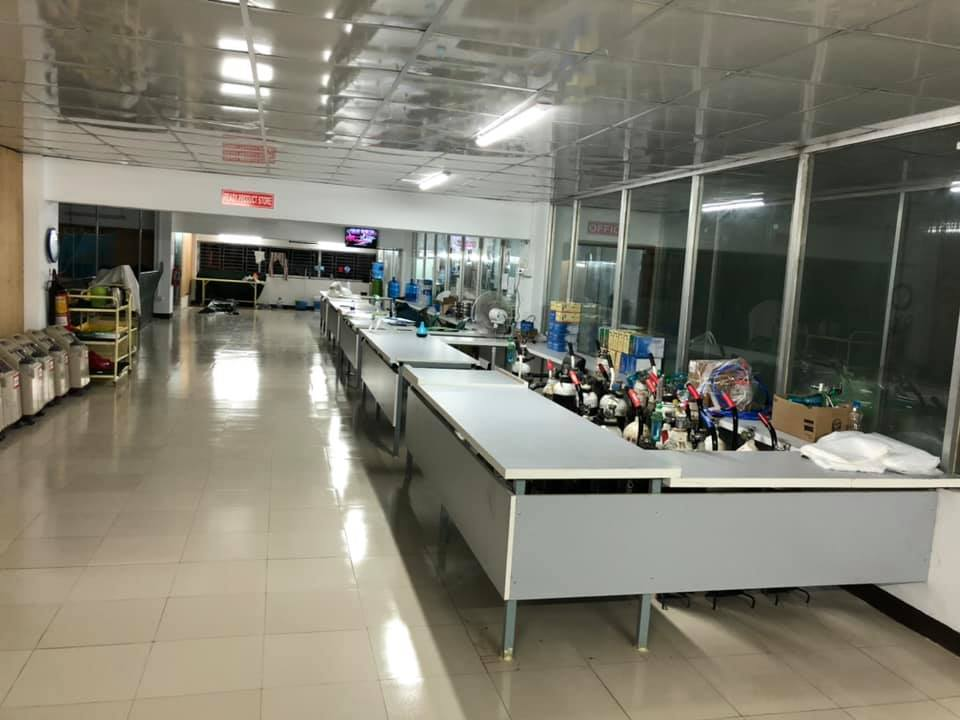
Chattogram Field Hospital

== See also ==
- Aid station
- Argentine Air Force Mobile Field Hospital
- Battalion Aid Station
- Casualty Clearing Station
- Expeditionary Medical Support System
- Forward surgical teams
- Hospital ship
- Portable Surgical Hospital
- Regimental Aid Post
- Shipping container clinic
- List of former United States Army medical units
