= Battalion Aid Station =

U.S. military medical unit

In the United States Army and Marine Corps, a battalion aid station is a medical section within a battalion's support company. As such, it is the forwardmost medically staffed treatment location.

During peacetime, it is led by a medical operations officer, a first lieutenant in the Army Medical Service Corps or a lieutenant from the Navy Medical Corps. During combat, a commissioned medical doctor with the Army Medical Corps may assume leadership of the platoon and direct medical operations. However, in the Army, the medical service officer normally retains control of training, planning, and administration of the platoon while the doctor in charge directs medical care. The primary mission of the battalion aid station is to collect the sick and wounded from the battalion and stabilize the patients' condition.

The battalion aid station belongs to, and is an organic component of, the unit it supports. It may be split into two functional units for up to 24 hours, the main aid station consists of a medical doctor and three 68W combat medics or Hospital Corpsmen and a forward aid station consisting of a physician assistant and three more 68Ws or corpsmen. This allows the section to support more than one unit or care as the unit advances or withdraws.

According to the Geneva Convention, military medical facilities, equipment and personnel are non-combatants and may not be attacked as long as they remain in a non combatant role. Medical personnel are allowed weapons for the purpose of self- and patient-defense.

== Army battalion surgeon ==
A battalion surgeon is the chief medical officer of a military battalion in the Army or Marines. Despite the name, most battalion surgeons are primary care physicians, i.e. emergency medicine, family medicine, pediatrics, or internal medicine or general medical officers, and are not surgeons as generally understood, who perform invasive surgical operations. The term surgeon comes from the U.S. military's British origins; the British military has always described any physician attached to a frontline unit as a "surgeon".

While the Navy department still uses the general medical officer (GMO) physician to staff many BASs, the Army has worked to eliminate GMOs and fill most BASs with "residency trained physicians". A GMO is a physician who has completed medical school and a one-year "internship" that allows them to receive an independent medical license in the US. GMOs have limited medical knowledge and experience. The battalion surgeon is a special staff officer who advises the battalion commander on matters pertaining to the health of the battalion. Chief duties include responsibility of managing a battalion aid station (BAS), medical supervision of the battalion PA (physician assistant), performing sick call for members of the battalion, and supervising the medical planning for deployment. The battalion surgeon carries the United States Army rank of captain (O-3), major (O-4), or Navy rank of lieutenant (O-3) or lieutenant commander (O-4).

During peace time, a limited amount of Army battalions actually have a physician or battalion surgeon. The exception is aviation, special operations, and stryker brigade support battalions; which routinely have a battalion surgeon. Additionally, US Army maneuver battalions in South Korea maintain their full complement of battalion surgeons. Since physicians are usually in short supply and expensive to employ, most battalions have a PA that performs the duties of "primary care physician" for the members of the battalion. If a battalion is "authorized a physician" during a deployment, then the PROFIS (professional filler system) is used to pull a military physician from a military hospital to deploy with the battalion and serve as the battalion surgeon. A TDA/ MTF (medical treatment facility) physician usually wears a uniform, but they do exactly the same job as a civilian physician. A TDA physician sees military dependants, active duty patients, and retirees. During peace time the PROFIS system is in place, but rarely used.

Since the start of Operation Iraqi Freedom and Operation Enduring Freedom (Afghanistan) the PROFIS system has been used routinely. Doctors are "PROFIS" or pulled out of the MTFs in a type of lottery system that factors in the number of deployments the physician has been on, their specialty, and the length of time of the PROFIS assignment. Since most of the physicians chosen to be PROFIS battalion surgeons have been in primary care fields, the Army has had a hard time retaining or recruiting physicians with those specialties.

== Marine corps battalion aid station ==
Because of the strictly combatant role of the Marine Corps, the Marine Corps does not have organic medical personnel and the Navy supplies medical officers and hospital corpsmen for them. As with the Army, the battalion surgeon is the chief medical officer in a Marine battalion. The battalion surgeon is a staff officer who advises the battalion commander on health and medical matters pertaining to the battalion. A battalion surgeon carries the United States Navy rank of lieutenant (O-3) or lieutenant commander (O-4).

The staffing of a Marine Corps BAS is slightly different from the Army. The battalion surgeon technically manages the BAS including the assistant battalion surgeon, either a medical officer or physician assistant medical service officer as well as corpsmen. The BAS may also be staffed by an independent duty corpsman, a corpsman trained to function independently of a medical officer and who function much in the same way as a physician assistant. A chief hospital corpsman, known as a "battalion chief", is also usually part of a BAS and supervises the other corpsmen.

== See also ==
- Portable surgical hospital
- Mobile Army Surgical Hospital
- Combat Support Hospital
- Field hospital
- Ambulance#Military use
