= 45th Portable Surgical Hospital =

United States military hospital

45th Surgical Hospital
- Active: 1943–1945; 1953–1954; 1956–1970
- Country: US
- Branch: Regular Army
- Engagements: World War II; Korean War; Vietnam War

Commanders
- Notable commanders: Major Gary P. Wratten

The 45th Surgical Hospital was a United States military hospital that saw service in the China-Burma-India theater in World War II, Korea, and Vietnam.

== Lineage ==
Activated 7 June 1943 at Camp White, Oregon as the 45th Portable Surgical Hospital
Inactivated 1945
Activated 1953 in Korea
Inactivated 1954
Activated 1956 at Fort Sam Houston Texas
Inactivated in the Republic of Vietnam, 10 December 1970

== Honors ==
=== Campaign participation credit ===
- World War II
1. India-Burma
2. China Defensive
3. Central Burma
4. China Offensive
- Korean War
1. Third Winter Campaign
2. Summer-Fall 1953
- Vietnam

== Decorations ==
- Meritorious Unit Citation (Army)
1. VIETNAM 1966-1969

== Distinctive unit insignia ==
=== Description ===
A silver color metal and enamel device 1 1/4 inches (3.18 cm) in height overall consisting of a black Chinthe astride a silver cross issuing from a Taeguk between two maroon fleams. All in front and below a stylized palm branch with two oak leaves proper.

=== Symbolism ===
Maroon and white are the colors used for the Medical Department. The Chinthe or Burmese griffin, taken from the seal of Burma, refers to the Hospital's service in that area during World War II. The Taeguk alludes to the Hospital's service in Korea and together with the two fleams (a heraldic surgical instrument used in early medicine) represents the two campaigns in Korea. The fleams and cross further symbolize the basic mission of the Surgical Hospital. The palm symbolizes long life and the oak leaves strength and bravery.

=== Background ===
Captain Dardas

The distinctive unit insignia was approved on 3 September 1969.

== Vietnam ==
The main body of the 45th arrived at Vung Tau, Vietnam on 4 October 1966. On 4 November 1966, the 45th's commanding officer, Major Gary P. Wratten, was killed during a mortar attack.

== See also ==
- List of former United States Army medical units
- Mobile Army Surgical Hospital
- Combat Support Hospital
