= Army Medical Department (United States) =

U.S. Army's primary healthcare organization

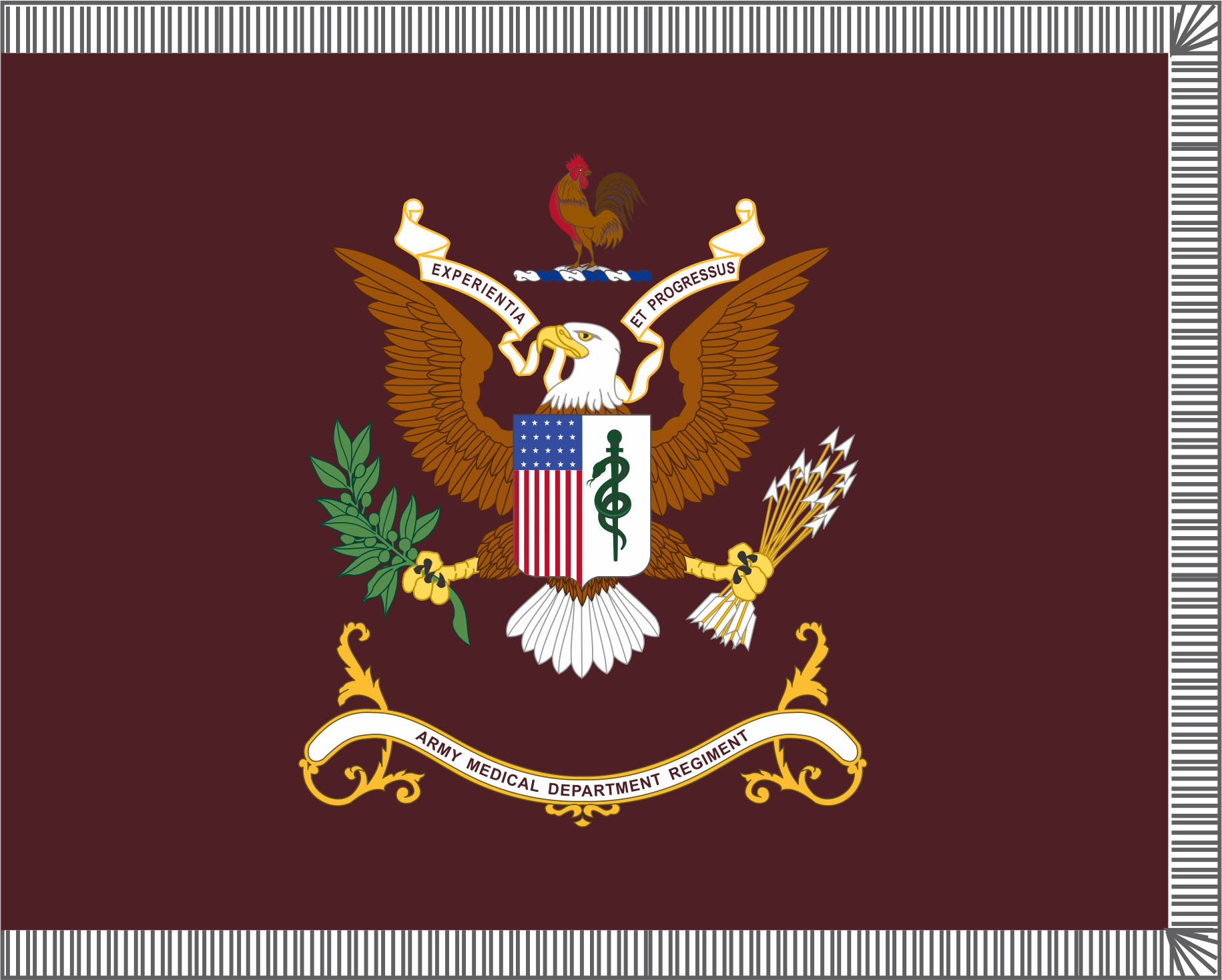
- U.S. Army Medical Department Regimental flag
- Active: 1775 – present day
- Country: United States
- Branch: United States Army
- Motto: "Experientia et Progressus"

The Army Medical Department of the U.S. Army (AMEDD), formerly known as the Army Medical Service (AMS), encompasses the Army's six medical Special Branches (or "Corps"). It was established as the "Army Hospital" in July 1775 to coordinate the medical care required by the Continental Army during the Revolutionary War. The AMEDD is led by the surgeon general of the U.S. Army, a lieutenant general.

The AMEDD is the U.S. Army's healthcare organization (as opposed to an Army Command), and is present in the Active Army, the U.S. Army Reserve, and the Army National Guard components. It is headquartered at Fort Sam Houston, San Antonio, Texas, which hosts the AMEDD Center and School (AMEDDC&S). Large numbers of AMEDD senior leaders can also be found in the Washington D.C. area, divided between the Pentagon and Walter Reed National Military Medical Center (WRNMMC).

The U.S. Army Medical Center of Excellence, within the AMEDDC&S, provides training to the officers and enlisted service members of the AMEDD. As a result of BRAC 2005, enlisted medical training was transferred to the new Medical Education and Training Campus, consolidating the majority of military-enlisted medical training in Fort Sam Houston.

The current Surgeon General of the U.S. Army and commander of the U.S. Army Medical Command (MEDCOM) is LTG Mary Krueger (since 25 January 2024).

== History ==
Both the AMEDD and the United States Army Medical Corps trace their origins back to July 27, 1775, when the Continental Congress established the "Army Hospital", which was at that time overseen by the "Director General and Chief Physician." Pennsylvania and the middle colonies picked up the task of caring for the incapacitated soldiers in various makeshift ways. Congress provided an Army medical organization only in times of war or emergency until 1818, at which point it created a permanent "Medical Department." The Army Nurse Corps originated in 1901, the Dental Corps began in 1911, the Veterinary Corps in 1916, the Medical Service Corps emerged in 1917 (during WW I the Sanitary Corps was created as a temporary organization to relieve U.S. Army physicians from a variety of duties), and the Army Medical Specialist Corps came into existence in 1947.

The Army Organization Act of 1950 renamed the Medical Department to "Army Medical Service" and on June 4, 1968 the Army Medical Service was renamed to the Army Medical Department.

== Heraldry ==
=== Coat of arms ===
A regimental coat of arms was devised for the Medical Department and was most likely first used in 1818. The twenty white stars on a blue background and the red and white stripes represent the U.S. flag of 1818. The green staff entwined with a green serpent combined two symbols: the rod of Asclepius from classical mythology symbolizing medicine and healing, along with the color green associated with the Medical Corps during the last half of the 19th Century. The colors Argent (silver/white) and Gules (red) are associated with the flag of the United States. The rooster is associated with the ancient Greek and Roman god of healing and medicine, Aesculapius. The ancient Greeks believed that the rooster's crowing at dawn drove away the evil disease-spreading demons from the temples so that it could be a place of healing. The torse (twisted rope) below the rooster shows alternating blue and silver colors which were representative of the Army in 1818. The Latin motto Experientia et Progressus (Experience and Progress) is meant to convey the steady and unfailing progress of the Army Medical Department since 1775.

=== Regimental insignia (crest) ===
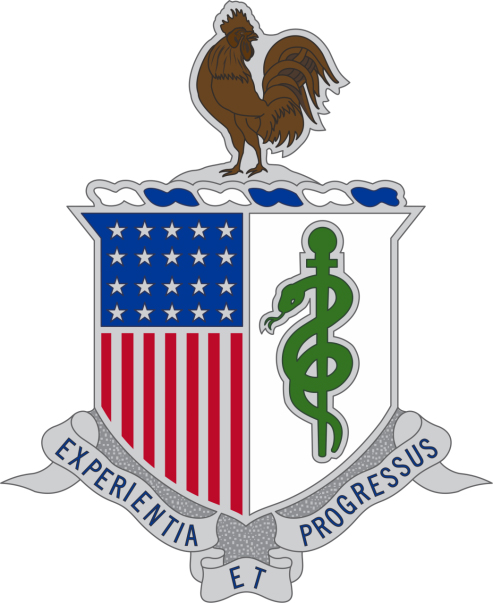
The AMEDD Regimental Insignia

The design of the AMEDD regimental insignia (crest) is derived from the regimental coat of arms. It is one of the US Army's fourteen regimental corps insignias. The insignias are worn over the right breast pocket on the Army Service Uniform (ASU) and signify a service member's branch of service. The "new" AMEDD insignia was approved on October 27, 2014.

=== Branch (corps) insignia ===
In 1851, "a caduceus embroidered in yellow silk on a half chevron of emerald green silk" was first authorized and worn by hospital stewards of the Medical Department. The caduceus in its present form was approved in 1902. Today, the AMEDD branch corps insignia is a gold color medal caduceus, 1 inch in height. With the exception of the Medical Corps, each Corps is identified by a black enamel letter (or letters) centered on the caduceus indicative of the specific branch. The insignia for Medical Service Corps is silver.

The caduceus symbolizes the non-combatant role of the AMEDD and not medicine per se. It came into popular use for medicine in the United States after the First World War. As medical professionals returned to civilian practice, they brought the caduceus symbol back with them. Over time, Americans began to associate the caduceus with medicine. The Rod of Asclepius is the more appropriate symbol for medicine in a civilian setting.

== Medical special branches ==
There are currently six special officer branches (corps) in the AMEDD.

=== Medical Corps (MC) ===
The Medical Corps consists of commissioned medical officers who are physicians (Doctors of Medicine and Doctors of Osteopathic Medicine) who have completed at least one year of post-graduate training (internship) or have been promoted from O-1 to O-3 following completion of medical school through USUHS or the HPSP.

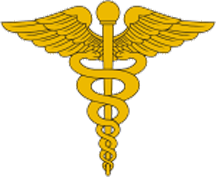

The MC traces its origins to 27 July 1775, when the Continental Congress created "a Hospital", essentially a Medical Department and corps of physicians, for the Continental Army. Medical officers in the United States Army were authorized uniforms only in 1816 and were accorded military rank only in 1847. Congress made the designation of "Medical Corps" official in 1908, although the term had long been in use informally among the AMEDD's regular physicians. Today, members of the MC work around the world at all echelons of the Army. The Chief of the MC is a major general, whereas the senior Army Medical Department officer is the Surgeon General (a lieutenant general).

Military physicians serve in one of several general career fields. The three main fields are operational field, clinical field, and research field.

Operational Medicine is the field of Army medicine that provides medical support to the soldier and his/her Chain of Command. Many operational physicians serve as Division, Brigade and Battalion level surgeons (the word "surgeon" is used to identify a physician that is assigned to a unit as a primary care provider and not necessarily as a General Surgeon). These physicians are either assigned through the "PROFIS" system or through permanent assignment (PCS). Deployments with units to combat theaters are for the duration of a deployment and the jobs are mostly filled by primary care physicians. A PROFIS provider can expect to be deployed away from their family for a total of 16 months (1 month before deployment, 12 months in theater, and 3 months for "stabilization" after return to the assigned units home station). This means that primary care physicians are deployed for longer periods than most "specialist physicians". A specialist (i.e. General Surgeon, Pulmonologist, Cardiologist, Trauma Surgeon, Rheumatologist) are usually deployed for 6 months. Operational Physicians should expect that more than 60% of their time will be spent in administrative roles and non-patient care. 40% of the operational providers time is spent caring for soldiers or supervising unit Physician Assistants (PA). With the recent Brigade Combat Team (BCT) restructuring, the demand for operational surgeons have increased. It is possible that the low retention rates of Captains and junior Major rank Physicians in the primary care fields are due to the discrepancies in deployment length and deployment frequency between primary care and specialty physicians.

Clinical Medicine is the field of Army medicine in which a physician in uniform performs similar functions to a physician in the civilian arena. These physicians are assigned to a PROFIS unit in one of the various Army MEDCEN (Medical Centers) and MEDDAC (Medical and Dental facilities). Primary care physicians usually deploy to fill battalion level surgeon positions. Medical specialists deploy to support CSH (combat support hospitals)

Research Medicine is filled by a minority of military physicians. Most of these research physicians are based in larger Army Medical Centers and the research institutes.

=== Nurse Corps (AN) ===
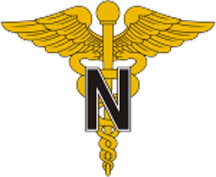

The Army Nurse Corps became a permanent corps of the Medical Department under the Army Reorganization Act (31 Stat. 753) passed by Congress on 2 February 1901. Its motto is "EMBRACE THE PAST – ENGAGE THE PRESENT – ENVISION THE FUTURE" and its mission statement declares "All actions and tasks must lead and work toward promoting the wellness of Warriors and their families, supporting the delivery of Warrior and family healthcare, and all those entrusted to our care and ultimately, positioning the Army Nurse Corps as a force multiplier for the future of military medicine."

=== Dental Corps (DC) ===
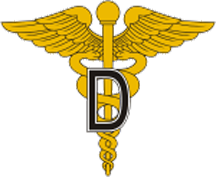

The Dental Corps (DC) consists of commissioned officers holding the Doctor of Dental Surgery (DDS) degree or Doctor of Dental Medicine (DMD) degree. The chief of the Dental Corps is a major general. Enlisted soldiers may be assigned as dental assistants, although their collar insignia lacks the 'D' and is the same as that worn by medics. Army Dental Corps Officers may train further in the following advanced training programs after Dental School:

- Advanced Education in General Dentistry
- Comprehensive Dentistry (2-year AEGD)
- Endodontics
- Oral and Maxillofacial Surgery
- Orthodontics and Dentofacial Orthopedics
- Pediatric Dentistry
- Periodontics
- Prosthodontics
- Public Health Dentistry
- Oral Pathology

The US Army currently offers fellowship training in the following areas for Dental Corps Officers (applicants must have already completed a recognized specialty training program):

- Oral-facial pain
- Maxillofacial prosthodontics
- Healthcare Administration
- Dental informatics

The following ADA recognized specialties are not represented in the US Army Dental Corps:

- Oral and Maxillofacial Radiology

The chief of the Army Dental Corps is Major General Thomas R. "Rob" Tempel Jr. His father, Major General Thomas R. Tempel Sr. served as Chief of the Army Dental Corps from 1990 to 1994.

=== Veterinary Corps (VC) ===
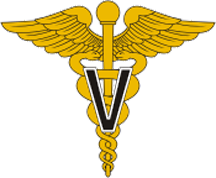

The U.S. Army Veterinary Corps was established by an Act of Congress on 3 June 1916. Recognition of the need for veterinary expertise had been evolving since 1776 when General Washington directed that a "regiment of horse with a farrier" be raised.

The US Army Veterinary Corps plays a significant role in current operations. Veterinary units are critical in ensuring remarkably low food borne illness rates. This is in great measure a result of veterinary inspection of subsistence in the United States as well as the approval of safe food sources around the world. Army veterinarians ensure the health of military working dogs and assist with host-nation related animal emergencies. Veterinary staff advisors also play key roles regarding issues involving chemical and biological defense.

In the United States, military veterinary supervision of operational ration assembly plants, supply and distribution points, ports of debarkation, and other types of subsistence operations are critical to ensuring safe, wholesome food for our Soldiers, Sailors, Airmen, Marines, and their family members. Members of the Veterinary Corps also participate in medical research and development, including vaccine, antitoxin, and antidote work aimed at protecting military personnel.

The Army Veterinary Corps consists of approximately 800 veterinarians and warrant officers in both active component and Army Reserve. Its responsibilities include food safety and security, animal healthcare, veterinary public health, and research and development.

The Chief of the Veterinary Corps is Colonel Deborah Whitmer.

=== Medical Service Corps (MS) ===
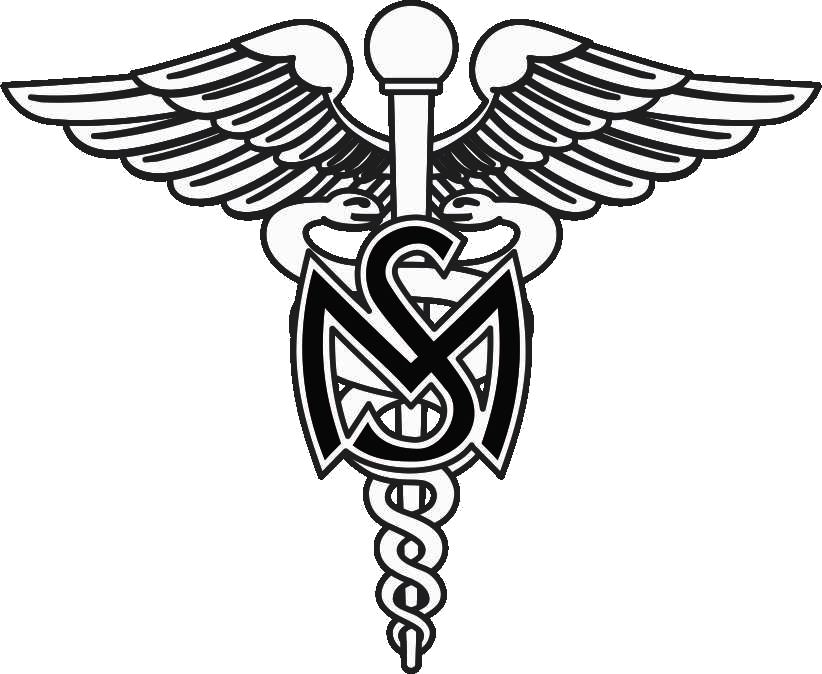

The Medical Service Corps consists of commissioned and warrant officers. Members are required to hold at least a bachelor's degree before receiving a commission. The MSC has the greatest range of duties performed by personnel. These may include administrative and support duties, such as healthcare administrators, health services officers in operational units, healthcare comptrollers, healthcare informatics officers, patient administrators, health service human resource managers, laboratory scientists (biochemists and microbiologists; who developed the Army Biological Defense Strategy based on COVID-19), health physicists, toxicologists, sanitary engineers, medical operations and plans officers, medical logisticians, health services maintenance technicians, and medical evacuation pilots. MSC officers serve in clinical support roles as clinical laboratory science officers, environmental science officers, pharmacists and preventive medicine officers. Medical Service Corps officers serve as commanders of field medical units in garrison and combat environments, and provide healthcare to patients as psychologists (PhD, PsyD), social workers (MSW with state license), optometrists, pharmacist, podiatrists, and audiologists. The Medical Service Corps also functions as a transitional branch, encompassing commissioned medical, dental, and veterinary students who have not completed their training through the Uniformed Services University of the Health Sciences (USUHS) or the Health Professions Scholarship Program (HPSP).

Medical Service Corps officers are drawn from the various Army commissioning sources (USMA, ROTC, and the federal and state Officer Candidate Schools) following a branch-immaterial curriculum. Since a primary function of the Medical Service Corps is to manage combat health support activities, its officers hold general command authority and can compete for company and field grade command of medical support formations and detachments, as well as logistics and aviation commands along with officers of the "Army competitive category" branches, such as infantry, ordnance, quartermaster. In contrast, Medical Corps, Veterinary Corps and Dental Corps officers are limited to command billets specific to their respective corps (e.g. AMEDD Immaterial commands for Medical, Nurse, and Medical Specialist Corps officers; branch specific commands for Medical, Dental, and Veterinary Corps officers).

The 20th Chief of the Medical Service Corps is Major General Michael J. Talley effective November 2022.

=== Medical Specialist Corps (SP) ===
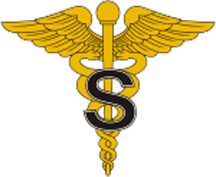

The Army Medical Specialist Corps consists of commissioned officers. Members hold professional degrees and serve as clinical dietitians, physical therapists, occupational therapists, and physician assistants. Members of the SP serve all around the world and at all echelons of the Army. The Chief of the SP Corps is BG Deydre S. Teyhen.

=== Aviation Section ===
On 20 December 1971 the Aviation Branch became part of the Force Structure Branch, Force Development Division.

The section controlled a number of units including:

- 45th Medical Company (Helicopter Ambulance)
- 92nd Medical Helicopter Company
- 171st Air Ambulance Company
- 498th Medical Company (Air Ambulance)
- 8th Medical Detachment
- 25th Medical Detachment
- 41st Medical Detachment
- 50th Medical Detachment (Helicopter Ambulance)
- 54th Medical Detachment (Helicopter Ambulance)
- 57th Medical Detachment (Helicopter Ambulance)
- 82nd Medical Detachment (Helicopter Ambulance)
- 83rd Medical Detachment
- 94th Medical Detachment
- 129th Medical Detachment
- 130th Medical Detachment
- 154th Medical Detachment
- 159th Medical Detachment (Helicopter Ambulance)
- 163rd Medical Detachment
- 236th Medical Detachment
- 237th Medical Detachment (Helicopter Ambulance)
- 254th Medical Detachment (Helicopter Ambulance)
- 283rd Medical Detachment (Helicopter Ambulance)
- 286th Medical Detachment
- 430th Medical Detachment
- 431st Medical Detachment
- 432nd Medical Detachment
- 433rd Medical Detachment
- 534th Medical Detachment
- 546th Medical Detachment
- 571st Medical Detachment (Helicopter Ambulance)
- 755th Medical Detachment
- 756th Medical Detachment
- 758th Medical Detachment
- 759th Medical Detachment
- 772nd Medical Detachment
- 774th Medical Detachment

== Enlisted Medical Career Management Fields (CMFs) ==
There are currently 22 Military Occupational Specialties (MOSs) for enlisted medical Soldiers:

- 68A Biomedical Equipment Specialist
- 68B Orthopedic Specialist
- 68C Practical Nursing Specialist
- 68D Operating Room Specialist
- 68E Dental Specialist
- 68F Physical Therapy Specialist
- 68G Patient Administration Specialist
- 68H Optical Laboratory Specialist
- 68J Medical Logistics Specialist
- 68K Medical Laboratory Specialist
- 68L Occupational Therapy Specialist
- 68M Nutrition Care Specialist
- 68N Cardiovascular Specialist (Deleted 1 Oct 2021)
- 68P Radiology Specialist
- 68Q Pharmacy Specialist
- 68R Veterinary Food Inspection Specialist
- 68S Preventive Medicine Specialist
- 68T Animal Care Specialist
- 68U Ear, Nose, and Throat (ENT) Specialist (Deleted 1 Oct 2021)
- 68V Respiratory Specialist
- 68W Combat Medic Specialist
- 68X Behavioral Health Specialist
- 68Y Eye Specialist
- 68Z Chief Medical NCO

In addition, outside the AMEDD, is the Special Forces Medical Sergeant (18D).

== Badges ==
Combat Medical Badges

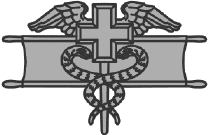
Expert Field Medical Badge

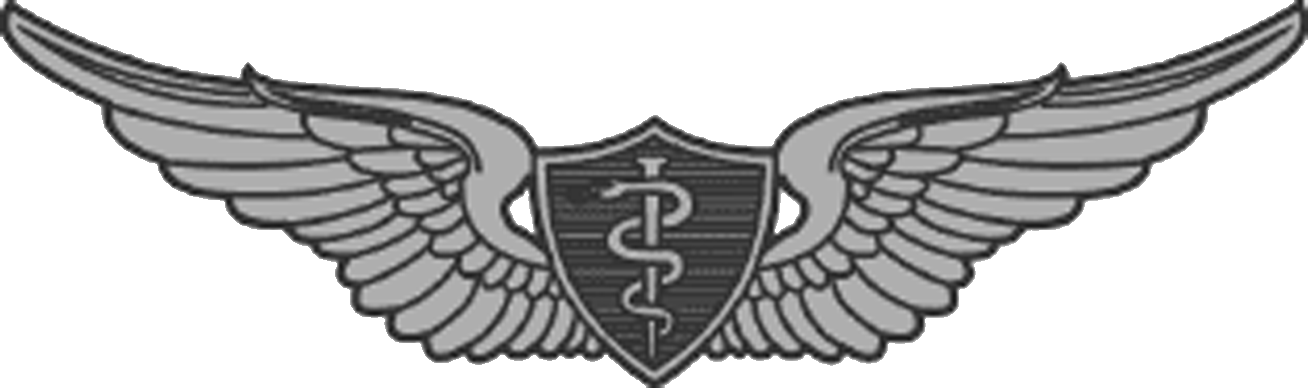
Flight Surgeon Badges

== See also ==
- United States Army Medical Department Museum
- United States Army Medical Command (MEDCOM)
- Order of Military Medical Merit (O2M3)
- Surgeon General of the United States Army (TSG)
- 68W (91W) (medic; U.S. Army)
- List of General Officers of the United States Army Medical Department in World War II
- List of ships of the United States Army#Hospital ships
- United States Army Ambulance Service (World War I)
- Battlefield medicine
- Combat Support Hospital (CSH)
- Field hospital
- Mobile Army Surgical Hospital (MASH)
- Military medicine
- U.S. Navy Dental Corps
- U.S. Air Force Dental Corps
- U.S. Navy Medical Corps
- U.S. Air Force Medical Corps
- U.S. Navy Medical Service Corps
- U.S. Air Force Biomedical Sciences Corps
- U.S. Air Force Medical Service Corps
- U.S. Navy Nurse Corps
- U.S. Air Force Nurse Corps
- United States Army Hospital Corps
