= Combat support hospital =

U.S. military medical unit

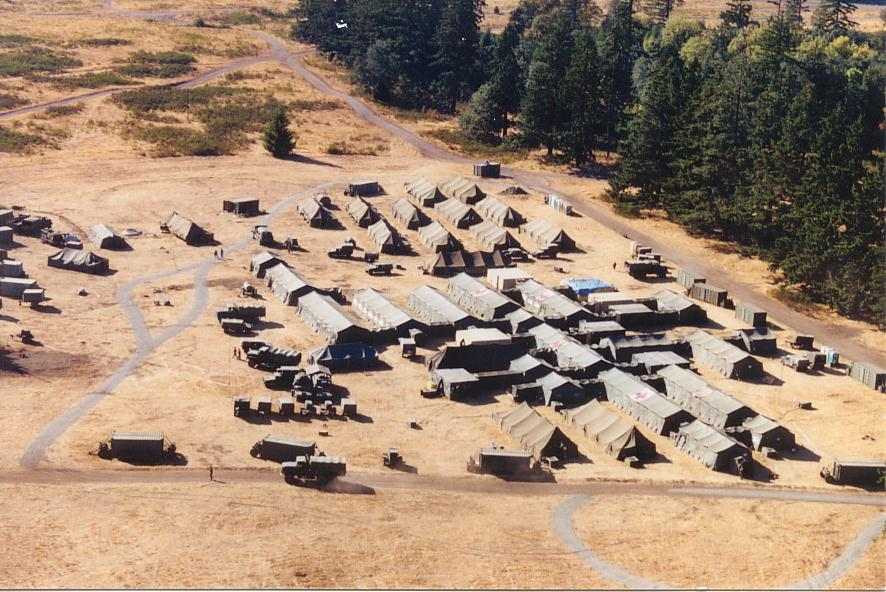
47th Combat Support Hospital at Fort Lewis, Washington, circa 2000.

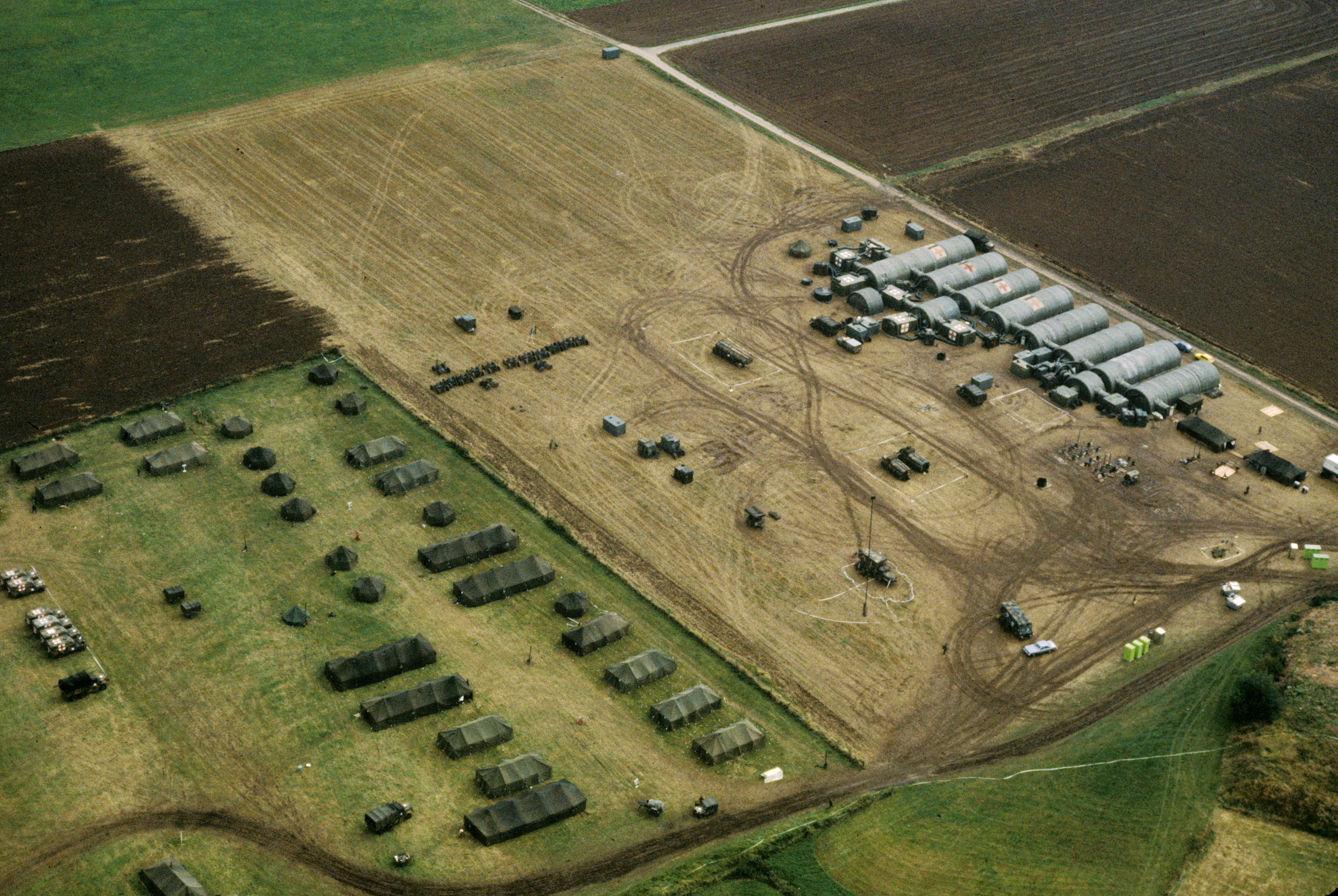
32nd Combat Support Hospital in Germany during Exercise Reforger '83

A Combat Support Hospital (CSH, pronounced "cash") is a type of modern United States Army field hospital. The CSH is transportable by aircraft and trucks and is normally delivered to the Corps Support Area in standard military-owned demountable containers (MILVAN) cargo containers. Once transported, it is assembled by the staff into a tent hospital to treat patients. Depending upon the operational environment (i.e., battlefield), a CSH might also treat civilians and wounded enemy soldiers. The CSH is the successor to the Mobile Army Surgical Hospital (MASH).

From November 2017, the United States Army and United States Army Reserve began reorganizing combat support hospitals into smaller, modular units called "field hospitals".

== Facility ==
The size of a combat support hospital is not limited, since tents can be chained together; it will typically deploy with between 44 and 248 hospital beds, with 44 beds being most common. For patient care the CSH is climate-controlled, and has pharmacy, laboratory, X-Ray (often including a CT Scanner) and dental capabilities (ATP 4-02.5 Casualty Care, May 2013). It provides its own power from generators.

The great operational advantage of the Deployable Medical Systems (DEPMEDS) facility is the use of single or double expanding ISO containers or units to create hard-sided, air conditioned, sterile operating rooms and intensive care facilities, which can produce surgical outcomes similar to that seen in fixed facility hospitals and do so in an austere environment.

== Function ==
Because they are large and relatively difficult to move, combat support hospitals are not the front line of battlefield medicine. Battalion aid stations, the medical companies of Brigade Support Battalions and Forward Surgical Teams are usually the first point of contact medical care for wounded soldiers. The CSH receives most patients via helicopter air ambulance, and stabilizes these patients for further treatment at fixed facility hospitals. Ideally, the CSH is located as the bridge between incoming helicopter ambulances and outgoing air force aircraft.

The CSH is capable of providing definitive care for many cases. Current medical doctrine does not encourage wounded soldiers, if they are not expected to quickly return to operational status, to stay in the combat zone. This is a pragmatic decision as the resources are usually available to bring them home quickly. Military aircraft constantly fly into a theater of operations loaded with equipment and supplies, but often lack a back cargo. Given that adequate "airlift" is usually present, it is easy to evacuate wounded promptly. For this reason, the CSH bed capacity is not as heavily used as in past conflicts.

The CSH will generally have a ground ambulance company attached. This company consists of approximately four platoons of ground ambulances commanded by a Medical Service Corps officer. The ground ambulance company in cooperation with available air ambulances Medical Evacuation (MEDEVAC) is responsible for the movement of sick and wounded from the battalion aid station and other forward-deployed locations to the CSH, as well as evacuation through an established medical treatment chain leading ultimately, for those seriously sick or wounded, to hospitals in the Continental United States in cooperation with resources in the U.S. Air Force.

The CSH is larger than its predecessor, the Mobile Army Surgical Hospital. It is commanded by a colonel, rather than a lieutenant colonel.

A fully staffed CSH has over 600 people when fully staffed and 248 beds. The modular nature of the organization allows for partial deployments, and the full unit is not often deployed (ATP 4.02-5 Casualty Care, May 2013).

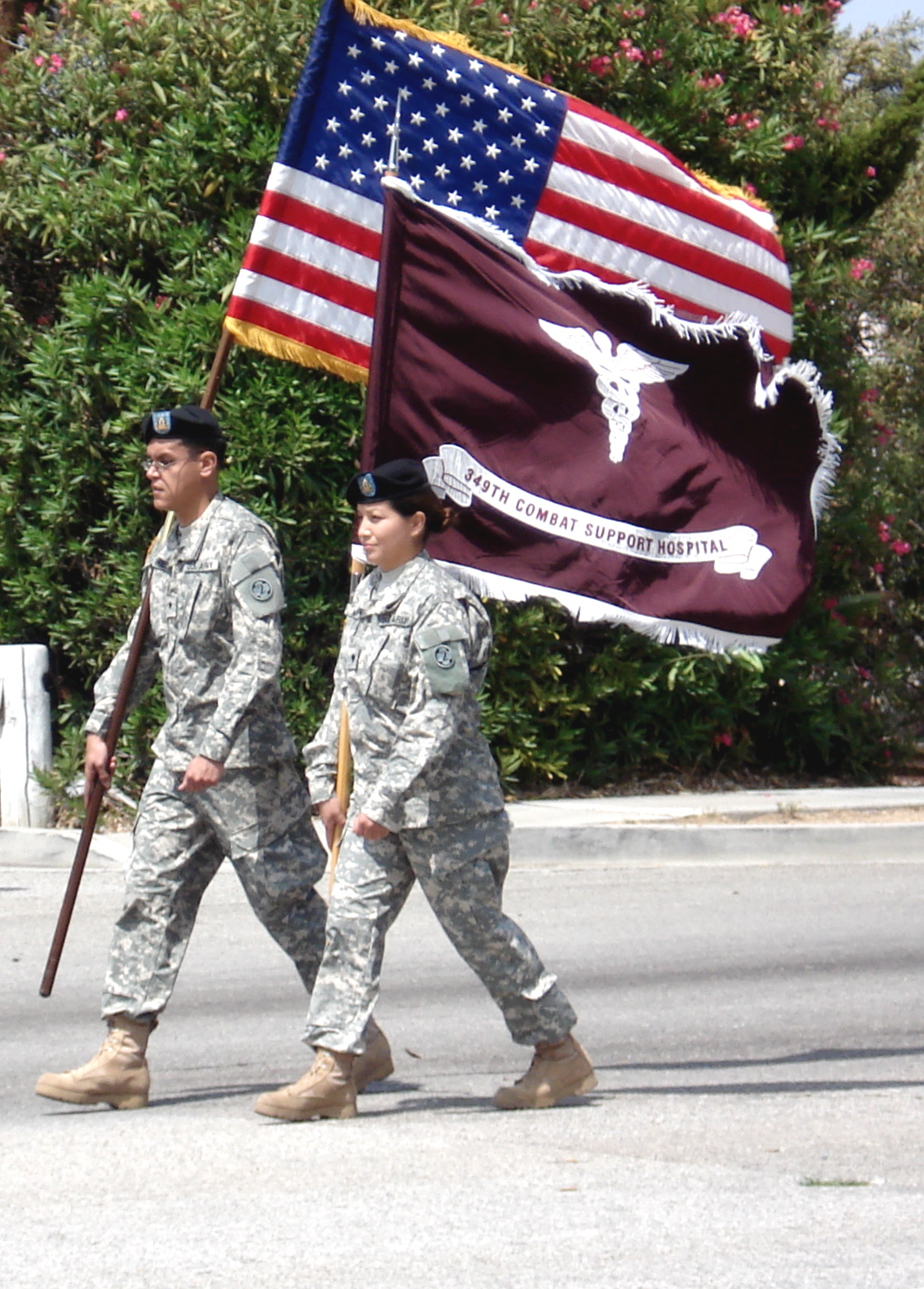
349th CSH unit, marching in the Torrance Armed Forces Day Parade.

== History and past configurations ==
In 1973 and 1974, the 28th Surgical Hospital (Mobile) (Army) (MASH) helped phase-in new designs for operating rooms and patient facilities from the previous canvas tents. Since then, all other configurations of army deployable hospitals have been inactivated or reconfigured to the CSH configuration. The last to convert was the 212th Mobile Army Surgical Hospital.

In the mid-1970s the Medical Unit, Self-contained, Transportable (MUST) designation was applied. During the Cold War, with conflict possible against the Soviet Union and Warsaw Pact, active duty MUST units were staffed by all the basic personnel necessary (e.g., medics, X-ray techs, pharmacists, cooks, clerks). Doctors, nurses and specialists would be mobilized and mate up with the unit in the field. The unit would be flown to West Germany, withdraw pre-positioned complete hospital MUST equipment and military vehicles from warehouses and then deploy. It contained all necessary functions to provide care for 200 beds, including two intensive care units, eight medical wards, an emergency room, four operating rooms, an orthopedic room, a laboratory, an X-ray, a pharmacy and the unit's transport vehicles. It consisted of hard containers, which would be transported to the designated site, then the wheels would be removed and then expanded. They housed the operating rooms, laboratory, X-ray, and pharmacy. Inflatable shelters were used to provide double wall insulated areas for the patient care areas of the hospital. These "inflatables" required a power system called a "utility pack" (also known as a "U-pack" or "power station") to provide utility services, heat, cooling, inflation, hot water, and filtered air from chemical, biological, and radiological contaminants. The utility pack was powered by a centrifugal flow gas turbine engine (Libby Welding Co. Model LPU-71, Airesearch Model PPU85-5, AmerTech Co. Model APP-1, or Hollingsworth Model JHTWX10/96). It provided electricity at 60 Hz AC, 400 Hz AC, and 24 VDC. At 250 beds, the hospital required eight U-packs. Each consumed 30 US gallons (110 L) of jet fuel per hour. After several years of using inflatables they were abandoned in the mid-1980s, largely due to the weight of the inflatables, and the amount of fuel required just to keep the tents from collapsing.

Under the 1980s "Army of Excellence" Table of Organization and Equipment, the MASHs had the task of providing enough emergency, life-saving surgery so that patients could live to be evacuated to hospitals further to the rear from the fighting line. The Combat Support Hospitals were 200+ bed hospitals that, after the MASHs, were next closest to the front line. The CSHs "specialize[d] in performing surgery on patients whose condition [was] not life-threatening." Behind the CSHs, but still within the Corps rear area, were the 400-bed evacuation hospitals, which provided resuscitative and restorative care. The basis of allocation for planning purposes was one MASH, one CSH, and two EVAC hospitals per Division supported, for a total of 1,060 beds per Division. General Hospitals in the Communications Zone (if one were established) or in the Continental United States would provide definitive care. Actual bed requirements would be driven by combat intensity and the theater evacuation policy.

== Field Hospitals ==
- 10th Field Hospital, at Fort Carson (CO)
- 11th Field Hospital, at Fort Hood (TX)
- 14th Field Hospital, at Fort Stewart (GA)
- 115th Field Hospital, at Fort Polk (LA)
- 131st Field Hospital, at Fort Bliss (TX)
- 147th Field Hospital, at Joint Base Lewis–McChord (WA)
- 528th Field Hospital, at Fort Bragg (NC)
- 586th Field Hospital, at Fort Campbell (KY)

Overseas

- Eighth Army
  - 121st Field Hospital, at Camp Humphreys (South Korea)
  - 502nd Field Hospital, at Camp Humphreys (South Korea)
- United States Army Europe and Africa
  - 512th Field Hospital, in Kaiserslautern (Germany)

US Army Reserve

- 18th Field Hospital, at Joint Expeditionary Base Fort Story (VA)
- 75th Field Hospital, in Tuscaloosa (AL)
- 228th Field Hospital, at Joint Base San Antonio (TX)
- 256th Field Hospital, in Twinsburg (OH)
- 301st Field Hospital, in St. Petersburg (FL)
- 303rd Field Hospital, in St. Charles (MO)
- 306th Field Hospital, at Fort Gillem (GA)
- 311th Field Hospital, in Blacklick (OH)
- 325th Field Hospital, in Independence (MO)
- 328th Field Hospital, in Salt Lake City (UT)
- 345th Field Hospital, in Jacksonville (FL)
- 348th Field Hospital, at Fort Meade (MD)
- 349th Field Hospital, in Bell (CA)
- 352nd Field Hospital, in Dublin (CA)
- 385th Field Hospital, at Fairchild Air Force Base (WA)
- 394th Field Hospital, in Seagoville (TX)
- 396th Field Hospital, in Vancouver (WA)
- 399th Field Hospital, in Taunton (MA)
- 405th Field Hospital, in West Hartford (CT)
- 452nd Field Hospital, in Milwaukee (WI)
- 801st Field Hospital, at Fort Sheridan (IL)
- 865th Field Hospital, in Utica (NY)
- 912th Field Hospital, in Niagara Falls (NY)
- 921st Field Hospital, in Bell (CA)

=== Former ===
Active duty combat support hospitals

- 4th Evacuation Hospital (Fort McClellan, Alabama)
- 5th Combat Support Hospital (5th CSH) (Fort Bragg, North Carolina)
- 16th Combat Support Hospital (16th CSH) (Fort Riley, Kansas)
- 41st Combat Support Hospital (41st CSH) (Fort Sam Houston, Texas)
- 46th Combat Support Hospital (46th CSH) (Fort Devens, Massachusetts)
- 67th Combat Support Hospital (67th CSH) (Germany)
- 128th Combat Support Hospital (128th CSH) (Ludwigsburg, Germany)

Reserve

- 48th Combat Support Hospital (48th CSH), reorganized to 410th Hospital Center, November 2017 (Fort George G. Meade, Maryland)
- 114th Combat Support Hospital (114th CSH) (Minneapolis, Minnesota)
- 117th Combat Support Hospital, Texas Army National Guard (1976)
- 309th Combat Support Hospital (309th CSH) (Hanscom AFB, Massachusetts)
- 337th Combat Support Hospital (337th CSH) (Indianapolis, Indiana)
- 339th Combat Support Hospital (339th CSH) (Coraopolis, Pennsylvania)
- 344th Combat Support Hospital (344th CSH) (Fort Totten, New York, transferred to Fort Dix, New Jersey)
- 369th Combat Support Hospital (369th CSH) (San Juan, Puerto Rico)
- 376th Combat Support Hospital (376th CSH) (Liverpool, NY)
- 377th Combat Support Hospital (377th CSH) (Chattanooga, Tennessee)
- 401st Combat Support Hospital (401st CSH) (Grand Rapids, Michigan)
- 914th Combat Support Hospital (914th CSH) (Columbus, Ohio)

The Army's Center of Military History has accessible online lineages for the 86th Combat Support Hospital (18 February 2011); the 115th Combat Support Hospital (18 April 2016); 212th Combat Support Hospital (2 July 2013); the 228th Combat Support Hospital (4 December 2002); the 325th Combat Support Hospital (17 March 2015); the 399th Combat Support Hospital (11 July 1996); the 801st Combat Support Hospital (20 November 2012) and the 914th Combat Support Hospital (11 July 1996).

== See also ==
- Military medicine
- 45th Portable Surgical Hospital
- M*A*S*H
- Ibn Sina Hospital, Baghdad, Iraq
- Casualty Clearing Station
- List of former United States Army medical units
