= PROFIS =

U.S. military personnel management system

The PROFIS or Professional Filler System is used by the United States Military to fill voids in personnel when a unit deploys on a combat or humanitarian mission. Due to the high financial cost of employing physicians, civil engineers, lawyers or other "high dollar specialists" in a military unit, usually at the battalion and sometimes at the brigade level a full time "specialist" is not permanently assigned to these units. When a unit deploys to an austere location, the demand for a specialist increases. The military's solution is to have a PROFIS or assigned specialist to these units that only serves with the unit when they deploy.

The system is mostly used for assigning physicians and other medical providers to a unit. Medical professionals are usually assigned to military hospitals or clinics, where they see patients, exactly like civilian providers. When a unit deploys, a provider is pulled from his or her hospital job and assigned with the unit. A PROFIS provider usually deploys with the unit for the duration of that unit's deployment. That usually means the PROFIS physician is with the unit a month before deployment, through the duration of the deployment (12–15 months), and then three months after the deployment. Usually physicians (family medicine, pediatrics, and internal medicine) are assigned to these lengthy deployments. As a unit surgeon, the physician can expect to do administrative as well as clinical duties. Many times the physician is 60% administrator and 40% clinician.

Medical and surgical subspecialists may be assigned PROFIS to combat support hospitals (CSH). These deployments may be shorter than deployment time for primary care physicians. Additionally, a CSH functions like a hospital, which means these physicians basically do the same job they do in CONUS (the continental United States), but they do the job in a combat theater.
