= Mobile Army Surgical Hospital =

Decommissioned type of U.S. Army medical unit

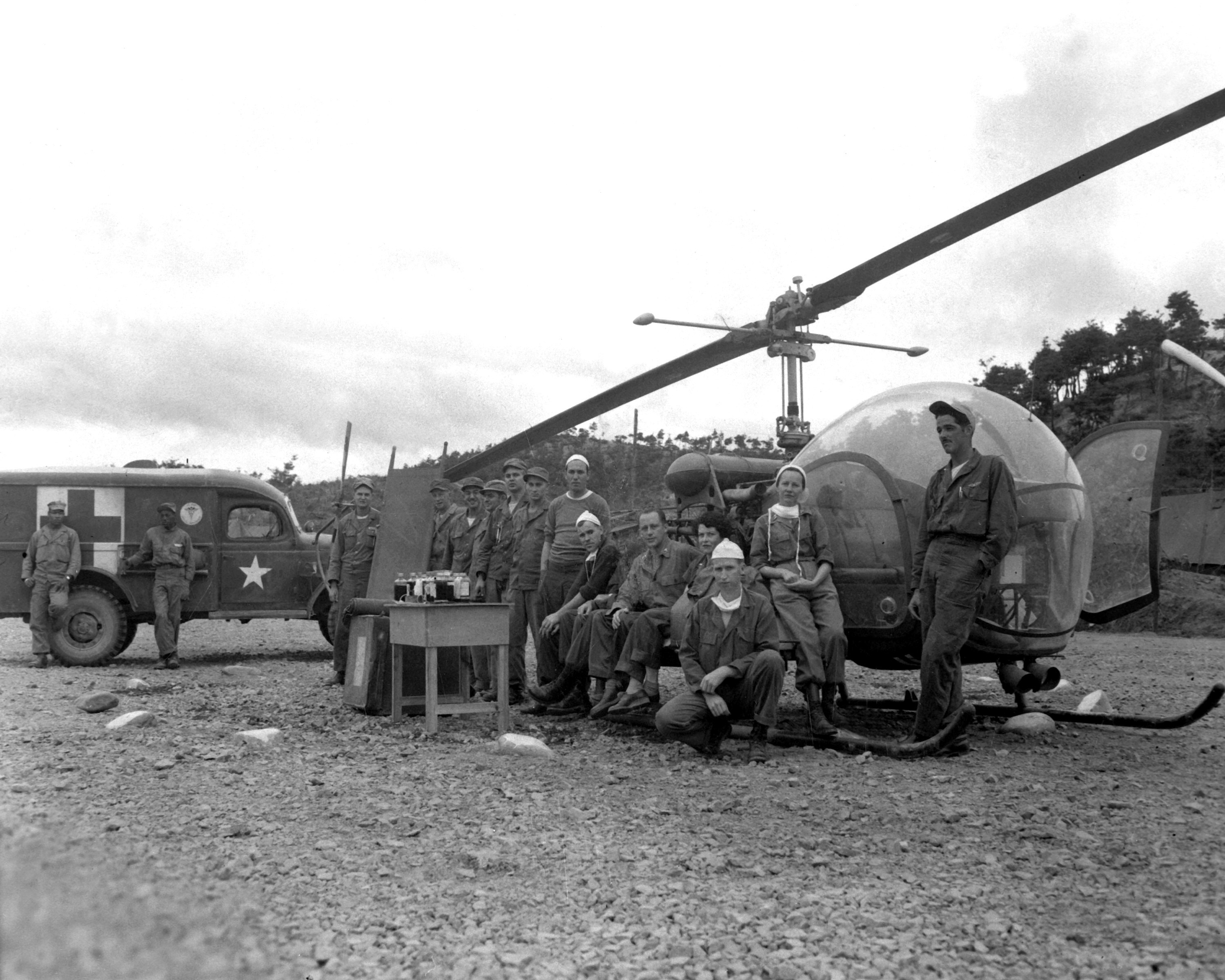
American personnel and equipment needed to save a life are assembled at HQs of the 8225th Mobile Army Surgical Hospital, Korea, in 1951.

Mobile Army Surgical Hospitals (MASH) were U.S. Army field hospital units conceptualized in 1946 as replacements for the obsolete World War II-era Auxiliary Surgical Group hospital units. MASH units were in operation from the Korean War to the Gulf War before being phased out in the early 2000s, in favor of combat support hospitals.

Each MASH unit had 60 beds, as well as surgical, nursing, and other enlisted and officer staff available at all times. MASH units filled a vital role in military medicine by providing support to army units upwards of 10,000 to 20,000 soldiers. These units had a low mortality rate compared to others, as the transportation time to hospitals was shorter, resulting in fewer patients dying within the "Golden Hour", the first hour after an injury is first sustained, which is referred to in trauma as the "most important hour". The U.S. Army deactivated the last MASH unit on February 16, 2006.

== History ==
=== In service ===
==== World War I ====
A precursor to MASH units, the American Expeditionary Force Mobile Hospital No. 1 was established, following the example of the French military automobile-chirurgical units shortly after the American entry to the war.

==== World War II ====
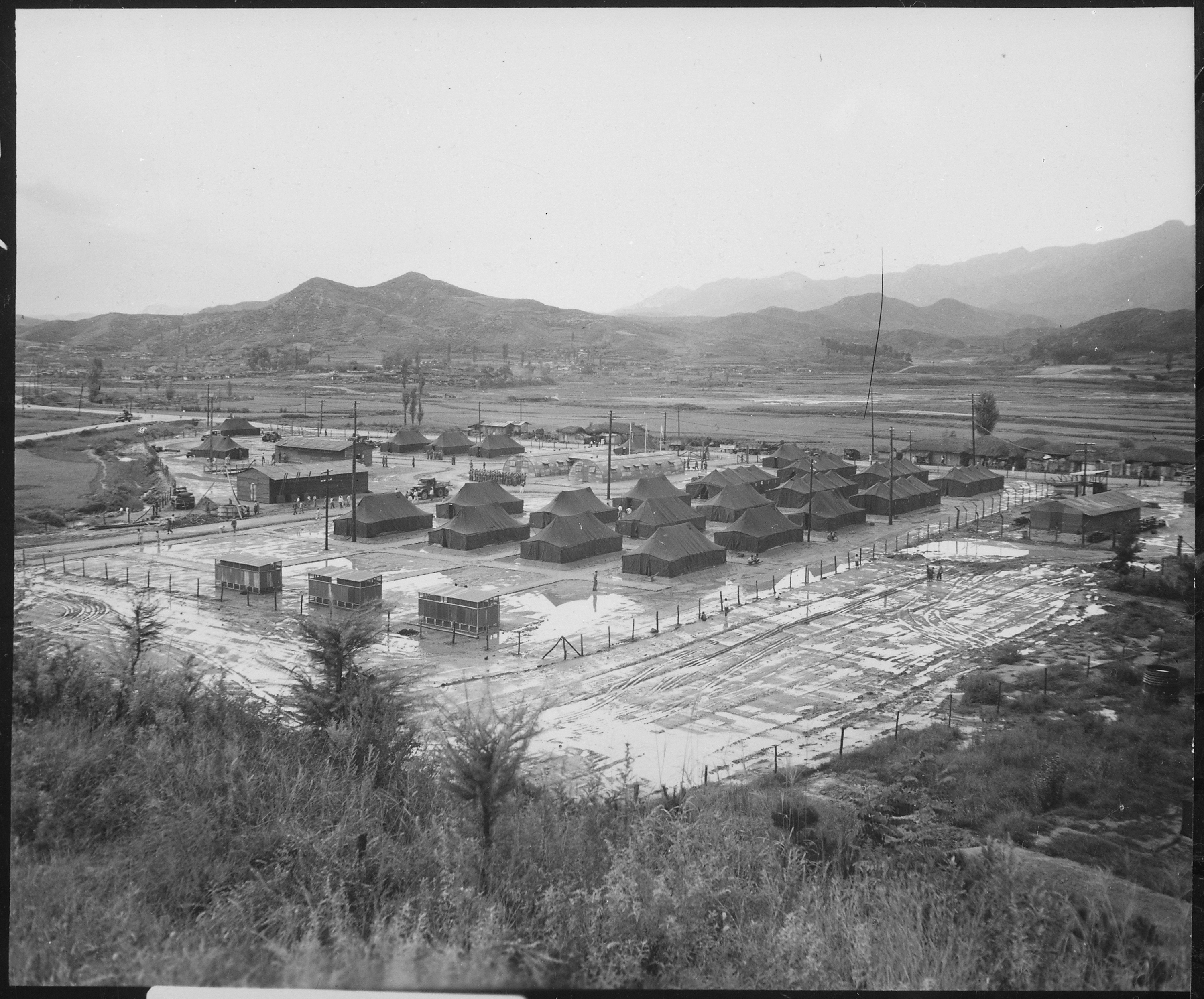
3rd Republic of Korea Mobile Army Surgical Hospital, Wonju, Korea, 1951

Principles for a mobile medical unit and their implementation were established through trial and error in the dental field during World War II by Major Vincent P. Marran, a medic in the United States Third Army. The effectiveness of his efforts were widely admired and supported by the command structure, but no formal designation was established. The first trials for what would become MASH units were established by the U.S. Army during World War II. The necessity for the U.S. Army to have more convenient treatment centers was shown by the long logistics of the stretched out supply lines during World War II. These units were known as "Auxiliary Surgical Groups" and would care for the wounded much closer than permanent hospitals, making them hospitals. In the early 1940s, Colonel Michael DeBakey and his colleague were selected to give recommendations on how to provide surgical care for the U.S. Army. The result was the ASG. Although these units were very inexperienced, they were incredibly effective resulting in five ASG units being created in 1943; this resulted in the ASG units being able to move along with the U.S. Army units located in Italy and was the basis in which MASH would directly come from.

==== Korean War ====
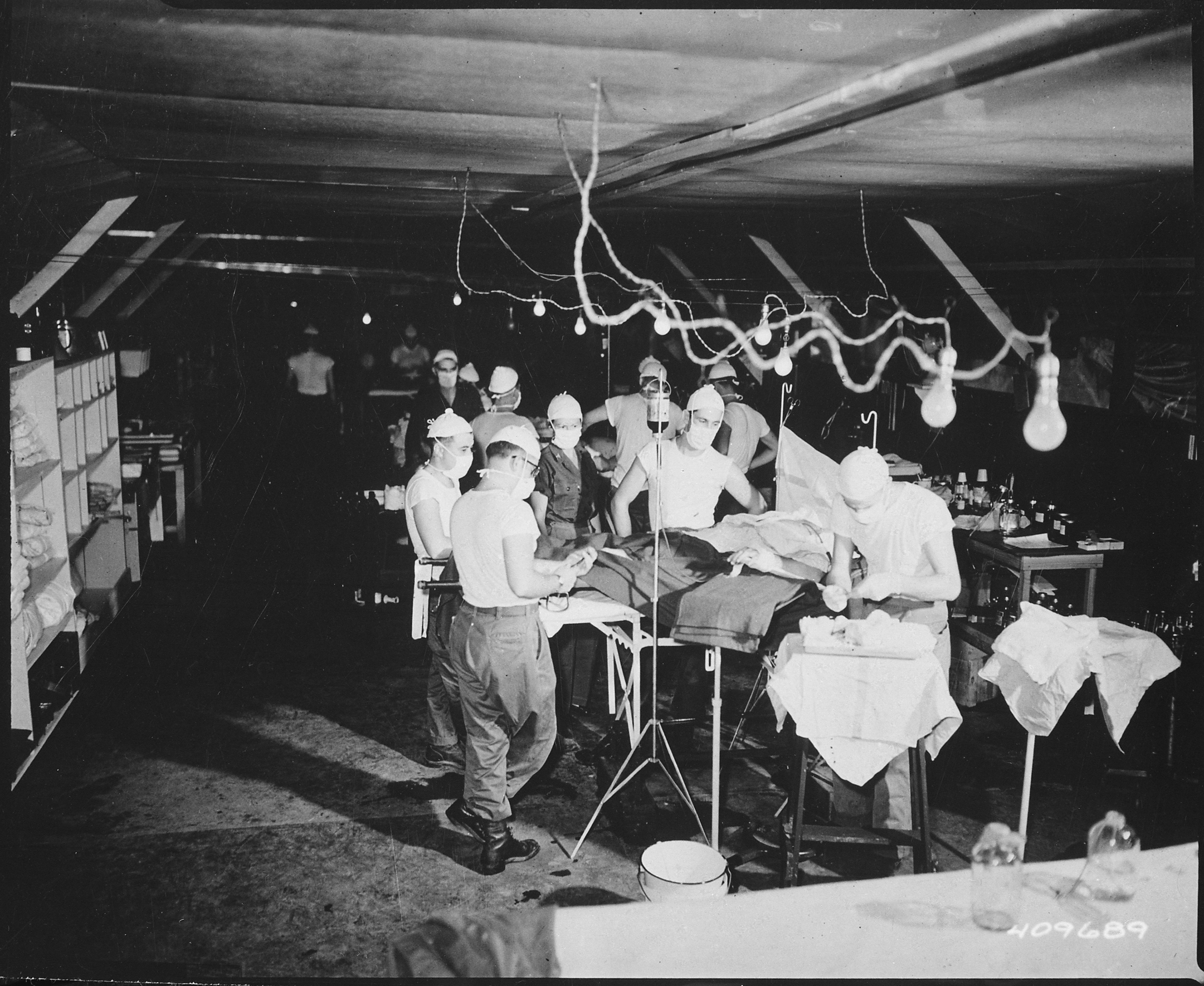
An operation is performed on a wounded soldier at the 8209th Mobile Army Surgical Hospital, 20 miles (32 km) from the front lines, 1952.

Formally, the MASH unit was conceived by Michael E. DeBakey and other surgical consultants as the "mobile army surgical hospital". Col. Harry A. Ferguson, the executive officer of the Tokyo Army Hospital, also aided in the establishment of the MASH program. It was an alternative to the random individual systems of portable surgical hospitals, field hospitals, and general hospitals used during World War II. It was designed to get experienced personnel closer to the front, so that the wounded could be treated sooner and with greater success. Casualties were first treated at the point of injury through buddy aid, then routed through Battalion Aid Stations for emergency stabilizing surgery, and finally routed to the MASH for the most extensive treatment. This proved to be highly successful; during the Korean War, a seriously wounded soldier who made it to a MASH unit alive had a greater than 97% chance of survival once he received treatment. MASH units often took 24 hours to set up at new locations once moved with armored units, trucks and airmobile. Airmobile or the early stages, known today as helicopters, were crucial to the war effort as they were fast traveling units that could pickup casualties and deliver them effectively back to MASH units. With mountainous terrain in Korea, this was crucial as ground transport could compromise the patients lives and would take longer to arrive to MASH units.

In 1997, the last MASH unit in South Korea was deactivated. A deactivating ceremony was held in South Korea, which was attended by several members of the cast of the M*A*S*H television series, including Larry Linville (who played Frank Burns) and David Ogden Stiers (who played Charles Winchester).

==== Vietnam War ====
The Vietnam War had little action for the MASH units within the U.S. Army. The Vietnam War marked the demise of the MASH units as only one unit, known as the "2nd MASH Unit", served actively, and only from October 1966 to July 1967. The Vietnam War was a very different environment from the Korean War which MASH units were created in. The Vietnam War required a change from MASH to MUST, or "Medical Unit, Self-contained, Transportable" units. MUST units had trailers, inflatable sections, and technology focused on a wider range of wounds from war. In MUST units the wounds were greatly different than in the Korean War resulting in many changes needed to the units as a whole with new innovations required. New treatments were also needed for burn victims with MASH units suffering a mortality rate of up to 90% for burn victims. Although this clearly showed progress in the medical field, the type of warfare changed making MASH obsolete in many cases. MUST units had to keep their equipment on standby at all times effectively replacing MASH units and later transferring into more revolutionized units in war-zones. The idea of a MASH unit is to be available at all times to those who have been wounded in combat on the front and required general or trauma surgery but as technology got better, there was a lot more room to improve transportation, technology used to treat soldiers, and the layout of these units resulting in MASH units being converted to MUST units.

==== Gulf War ====
During the Gulf War, in September 1990, the main body of the 5th MASH, 44th Medical Brigade, XVIII Airborne Corps, Fort Bragg, North Carolina, deployed to King Abdul-Aziz Air Base, Royal Saudi Air Force, Daharan Saudi Arabia and was the first fully functional Army hospital in the country. Their forward surgical team and Advanced Party had deployed in mid August to Daharan. This unit moved forward six times, always as the first up hospital for the region. In February 1991, the 5th MASH was operationally attached to the 24th Infantry Division to provide forward surgical care (often right on the front battle lines) to the combat units that attacked the western flank of the Iraqi army. In March 1991, the 159th MASH of the Louisiana Army National Guard operated in Iraq in support of the 3rd Armored Division during Operation Desert Storm.

Other MASH units that served in 1990–91 included the 2nd MASH, 1st Medical Group, Benning; the 10th MASH, 1st Medical Group, Carson; the 115th MASH (DCARNG); the 475th MASH (341st Med Group, KY USAR); the 807th MASH (341st Med Group, KY USAR); and the 912th MASH (TN USAR).

==== Operation Iraqi Freedom ====
The 212th MASH – based in Miesau Ammo Depot, Germany – was deployed to Iraq in 2003, supporting coalition forces during Operation Iraqi Freedom. It was the most decorated combat hospital in the U.S. Army, with 28 campaign streamers on the organizational colors. The 212th MASH's last deployment was to Pakistan to support the 2005 Kashmir earthquake relief operations. The U.S. State Department bought the MASH's tents and medical equipment, owned by the DoD, and donated the entire hospital to the Pakistani military, a donation worth $4.5 million.

==== Conversion to Combat Support Hospital ====
Internationally, the 212th MASH was converted to a Combat Support Hospital on October 16, 2006, as the last MASH unit.

The 212th MASH's unit sign now resides at the Army Medical Department's Museum in San Antonio, Texas.

In addition, one of the last MASH units worldwide was located in Pakistan serving as a civilian hospital to aid in recovery efforts following an earthquake in 2006. Known as the 212th MASH unit which was originally in Miesau, Germany, it was re-established for the Iraq War. In addition to treating soldiers, they treated over thirty thousand civilians. With an average survival rate of 97%, this was impressive considering how many victims there were of an earthquake and the longevity of these units from the late 1940s to the early 2000s. Although these hospitals were very effective in being able to provide suitable care to those in the battlefield and civilian populations, the MASH units soon became obsolete as MASH units were made for conventional wars; the Vietnam War, the Gulf War and the Iraq War were in different terrains than they were designed for resulting in different needs as they were much harder to traverse than Korea. New transportation vehicles such as the Bell H-13 (known as the first evac helicopter) and later the Sikorsky UH-60 made airmobile and other ground units ineffective in desert and tropical terrain. Lastly, technology made for treating patients in the operating room and elsewhere has gotten much more complex resulting in more space and care needed to treat soldiers along with many fewer troops being deployed.

== Field care ==
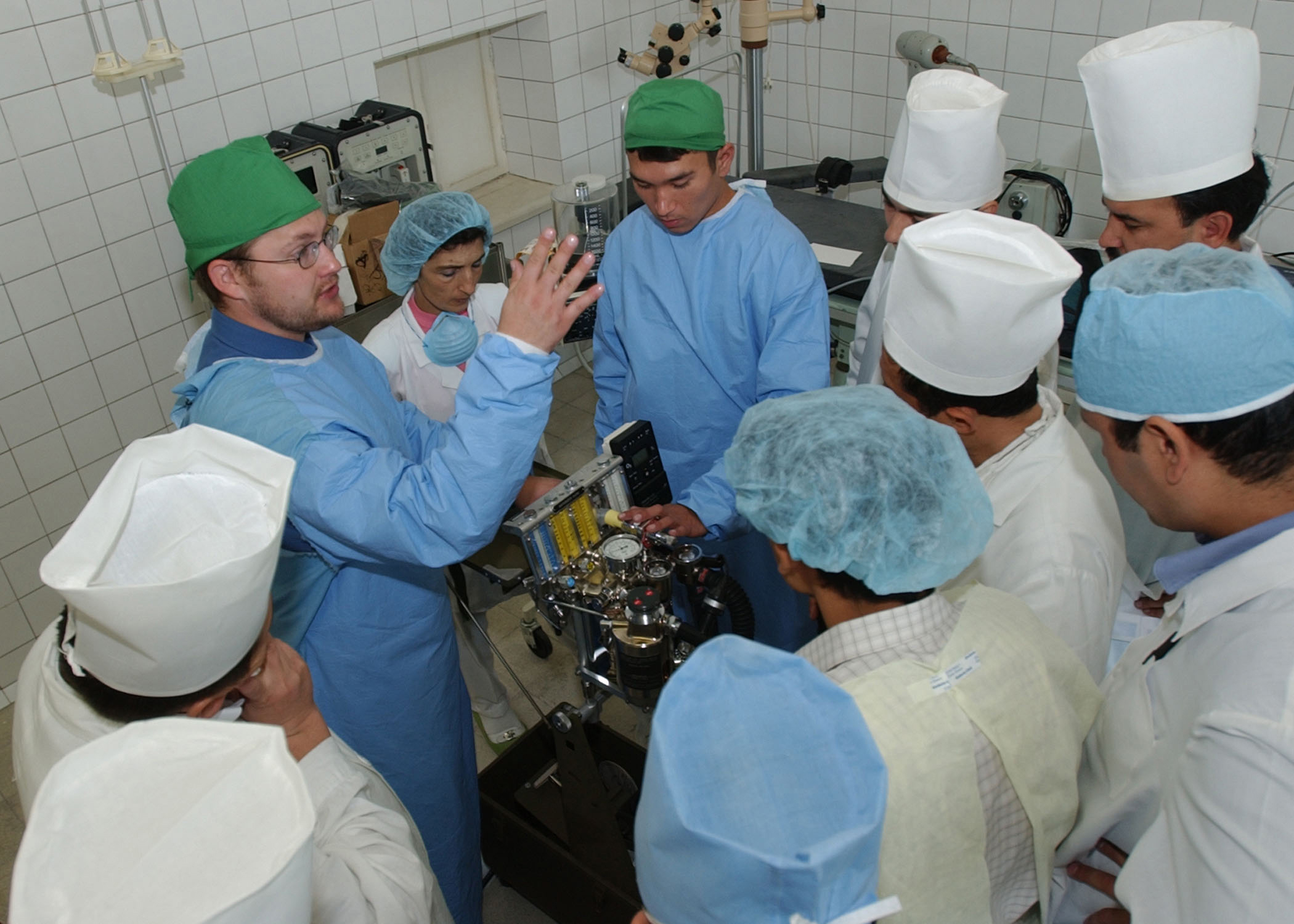
U.S. Army soldiers and interpreters train local Uzbek anesthesia providers on the 885 Mobile Anesthesia Machine at the Fergana Emergency Center in support of Operation Provide Hope.

The Korean War played a great role in defining MASH units. High casualties in the front line called for onsite paramedic care, such as ambulances and medical tents. Having learned from World War II that transporting wounded soldiers to rear hospitals was highly inefficient in reducing mortality rate, MASH units were established near front lines to supply mobile and flexible military medical care. They contributed to making improvements in resuscitation and trauma care, patient transport, blood storage and distribution, patient triage, and evacuation. The aeromedical evacuation system was developed to transport soldiers by aircraft at a quicker pace. Helicopters were frequently used as "air ambulances" during the Korean War, with the Bell H-13 serving as a predominant medical evacuation aircraft during the war. Military doctors stabilized wounded soldiers midair before getting them to a field hospital. MASH onsite paramedic care and air ambulance system decreased post evacuation mortality from 4% in World War II to 2.5% in the Korean War.

== Triage ==
MASH units played an important role in the development of the triage system, a technique that underscores emergency room (ER) medicine in hospitals today.

The system allows for caregivers to prioritize patient's wounds and injuries in order to get those who are severely injured treated as soon as possible. The patient's status is determined an overview of their respiratory, perfusion, and mental status. The current triage system consists of color-coding; each patient (and at times their different wounds) are tagged with either a black, red, yellow, or green tag.

Black	Deceased or so severely wounded that there is no hope for survival.
Red	Requires immediate treatment in order to survive.
Yellow	Not in immediate danger but requires medical care. Requires observation.
Green	Wounds or injuries that aren't completely disabling. Referred to as "walking wounded".

While the concept of triage had been used years before the Korean War, it wasn't until MASH units put it into real practice that the idea was fully developed. World War I and World War II saw the introduction of chemical weapons, such as mustard gas, which created a large influx of casualties and the need for more organization. Triage was first performed on the soldiers at battalion aid stations. Those who worked in the stations, be they nurses or medical officers, used the system to determine which soldiers needed further care or treatment and which soldiers could go back onto the battlefield. The soldiers that needed further treatment were then transferred to the MASH units to undergo triage once more. This time, nurses and doctors would work to prioritize who needed to be taken into surgery first; if it appeared that the soldier wouldn't survive much longer without surgery they were prioritized. MASH units typically followed the saying, "life takes precedence over limb, function over anatomical defects", a phrase which essentially means that they had to repair the most serious defect first. This thought process has since rolled over to the modern technique of triage in ERs nationwide.

== In popular culture ==
The MASH unit made its way into popular culture through the 1968 novel MASH: A Novel About Three Army Doctors by Richard Hooker, the 1970 feature film based on the novel, and the long-running television sitcom (1972–1983) also based on the novel. A 1953 film, Battle Circus, also took place at a MASH.

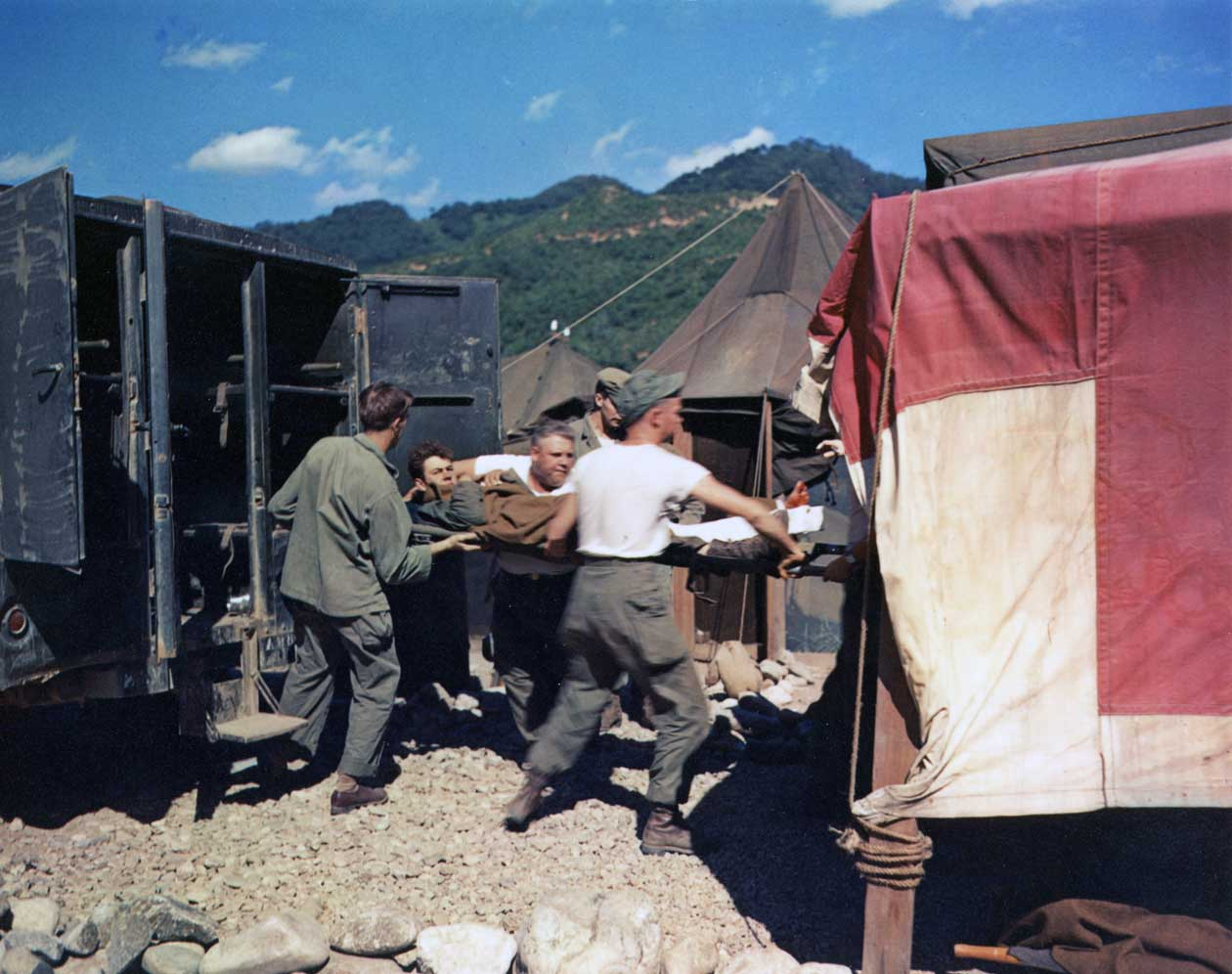
US Army medics move a wounded soldier on a stretcher from a 568th Medical Ambulance Company ambulance into a tent for treatment at the 8225th Mobile Army Surgical Hospital (MASH), Korea, September 1, 1951.

For narrative simplicity, the "4077th MASH" unit depicted in the novel, movie, and television series was smaller than real MASH units. The fictional 4077th consisted of four general surgeons and one neurosurgeon, around 10 nurses, and 50–70 enlisted men. In an average 24-hour period, they could go through 300 wounded soldiers. By comparison, the 8076th Mobile Army Surgical Hospital had personnel including 10 medical officers, 12 nursing officers, and 89 enlisted soldiers of assorted medical and non-medical specialties. On one occasion, the unit handled over 600 casualties in a 24-hour period.

== See also ==
- List of former United States Army medical units
- NORMASH, a Norwegian MASH unit during the Korean War.
- 45th Portable Surgical Hospital
- Battle Circus (1953 movie)
- Combat Support Hospital
- Field hospital
- MASH: A Novel About Three Army Doctors (1968 novel)
- M*A*S*H (1970 movie)
- M*A*S*H (1972–1983 TV series)
