= 1st Medical Brigade =

Medical brigade of the III Armored Corps, US Army

- Shoulder sleeve insignia
- Active: 3 August 1917 – 12 November 1945; 10 June 1950 – 24 March 1962; 3 January 1968 – present
- Country: United States
- Branch: United States Army
- Type: Medical
- Size: Brigade
- Part of: III Armored Corps
- Garrison/HQ: Fort Hood, Texas
- Nickname: Silver Knights
- Mottos: Fortitude and Compassion
- March: 1st Medical Regiment March
- Anniversaries: 28 May, the day the 1st Sanitary Train, 1st Division, AEF began combat operations during the battle of Cantigny, France
- Engagements: World War I World War II; Operation Desert Storm; Operation Enduring Freedom; Operation Iraqi Freedom
- Decorations: Meritorious Unit Commendation

Commanders
- Current commander: Colonel Matthew Hoefer
- Notable commanders: MG Paul R. Hawley MG George F. Lull; MG Glenn J. Collins MG Robert D. Tenhet

Insignia
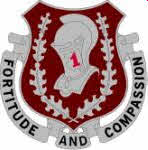
- Distinctive unit insignia

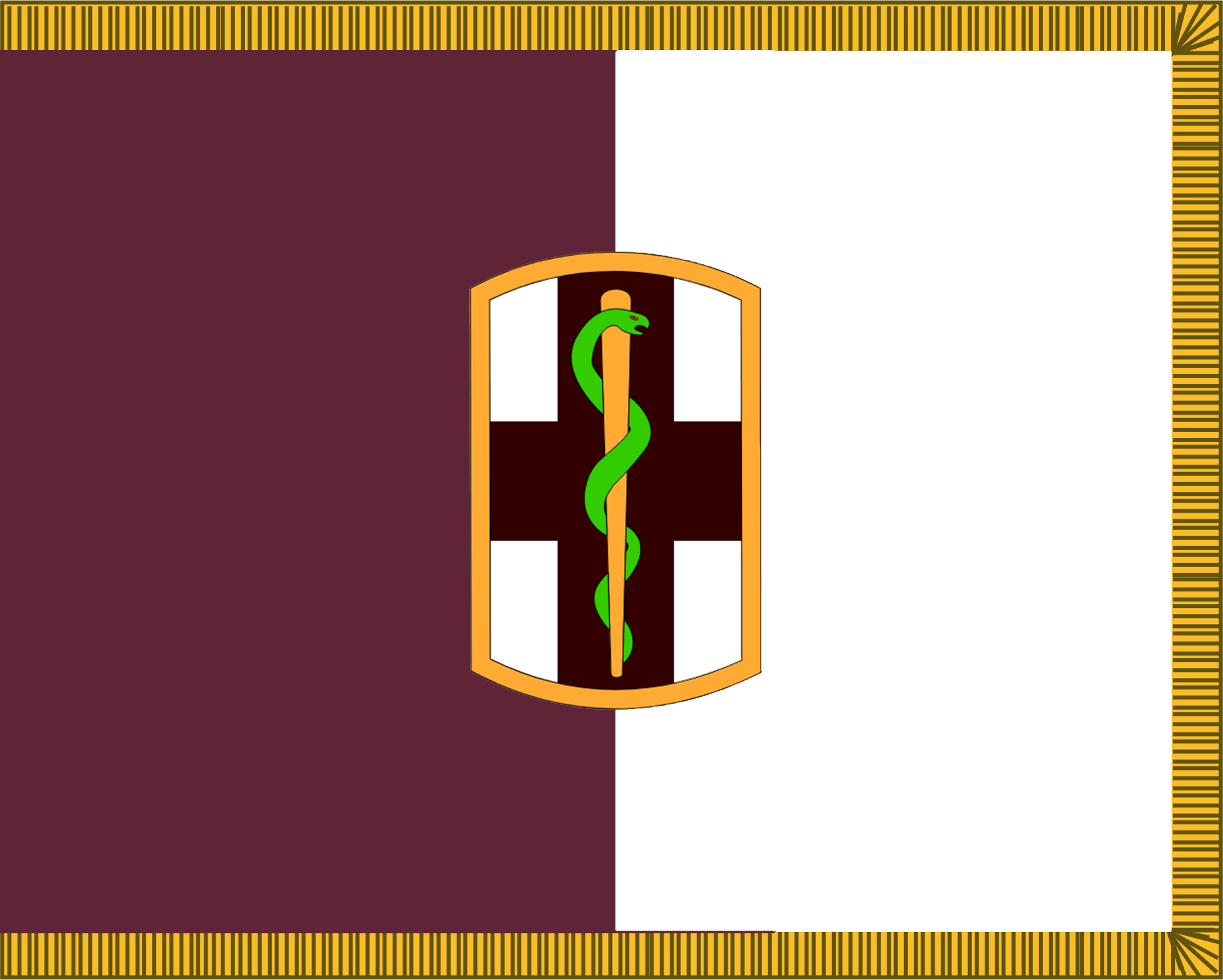
- 1st Medical Brigade Flag

The 1st Medical Brigade is a medical brigade of the United States Army. It is located at Fort Hood, Texas, providing health care and medical services to the Fort Hood community, and continuing training in its combat support mission.

== History ==
=== World War I ===
The 1st Sanitary Train, as originally organized, was composed of two battalions—one motorized and one animal drawn. The companies of the battalions had all been raised well before the start of the war, and were assembled as an organization upon arrival in France. Each battalion was composed of two field hospital companies and two ambulance companies. The first elements of the train—composed of ambulance company 6 (later renumbered 13) and field hospital company 6 (later renumbered 13) began movement to Hoboken, New Jersey, where they embarked for Europe on 14 June 1917, arriving in the port of St. Nazaire on 26 June. On 13 August, field hospital companies 2 and 12 and ambulance companies 2 and 12 landed on 1 and 3 September in Liverpool, England, and later moved to La Harve. On 1 December field hospital company 3 departed Fort Bliss, Texas and ambulance company 3 departed Fort Oglethorpe, Georgia, sailed from Hoboken on 5 December, and arrived at St. Nazaire on 22 December, among the last elements of the 1st Division to arrive in France. The 1st Sanitary Train was assembled, finally, in the Gondrecourt training area, where the division trained for combat operations.

The table of organization for a sanitary train called for a total of 927 officers and men. Each ambulance company had 12 ambulances; the animal drawn companies each had 70 mules to pull their ambulances, as well as 24 riding horses. Each field hospital company could hold 236 patients, although it was authorized no nurses; the animal drawn field hospital companies also had 30 mules and 22 riding horses each. In column, the sanitary train stretched for 1,160 yards—more than half a mile.

==== Sommerville Sector ====
Ambulance Company 13 of the 1st Sanitary Train was the only American ambulance company operational in the Sommerville sector and furnished litter bearers for duty in the trenches, evacuating patients to Field Hospital 13 (like the ambulance company, an organic unit of the 1st Sanitary Train) and from it to Base Hospital 18 at Bazoilles-sur-Meuse, and to Camp Hospital 1 at Gondrecourt. It did not establish a dressing station, as patients were moved direct by litters and by vehicles from the battalion aid stations to the field hospital. Because of road conditions near the front, the ambulance company's collecting point was some distance in the rear of the aid stations, so the wounded were carried through the trenches to the battalion aid stations and then back an additional 3 km to the collecting point at Bathelemont.

Field Hospital 13 was the only field hospital established for the 1st Division in the Somerville sector. Half of it, including X-ray and other necessary equipment, was located in a residence and two pavilions at Einville; the other half was in part of a hospital at Dombasle. As the base and camp hospitals to which this hospital was to evacuate were 81 km to the rear by road, patients were retained with the portion of Field Hospital 13 at Einville.

==== Ansauville Sector ====
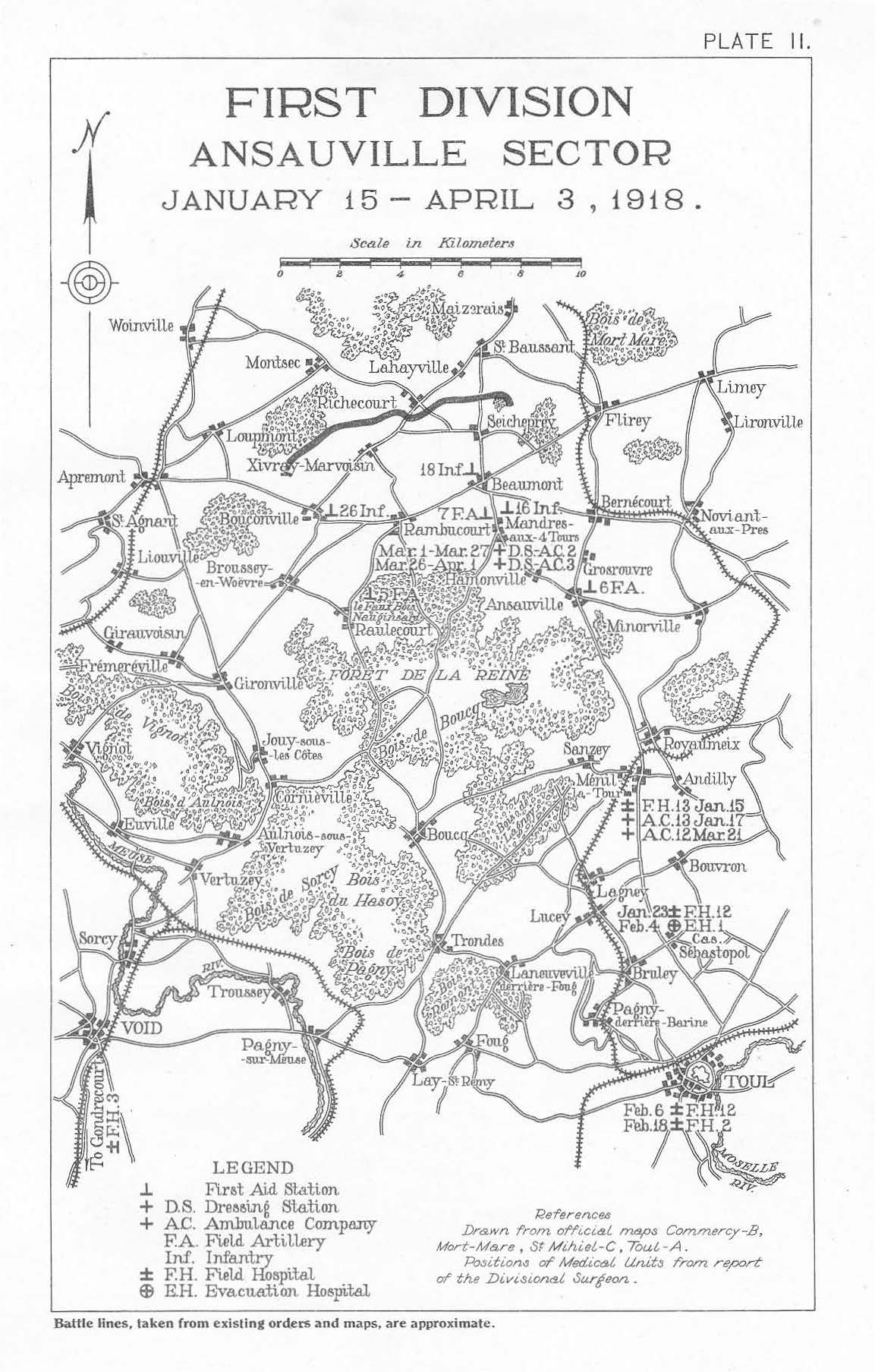
Map showing the location of medical units of the 1st Division, AEF, during Ansauville operations

The division surgeon's office, headquarters of the sanitary train, and headquarters of the train's field hospital and ambulance sections were at Menil-la-Tour. Medical Department personnel established an aid station at each regimental headquarters and battalion aid stations in battalion areas. The most advanced battalion aid stations were located in dugouts at Seicheprey. Because the village was under direct enemy observation and was shelled frequently, patients had to be evacuated at night, when ambulances could travel the road from Beaumont. Evacuation to the regimental aid stations often required that patients be carried a kilometer or more through trenches which often were knee deep in mud and water. Patients were usually suffering from disease, although a moderate number of men suffering from shell wounds, and on occasion a fairly large number of chemical casualties.

Infantry regimental aid stations were first established Beaumont and Mandres, but on 1 March the station Mandres moved to Bouconville. The aid stations at Beaumont and Bouconville were in basements of partially destroyed buildings and were made provided additional protection from indirect fire using logs, sandbags, and stone. The road between Beaumont and Mandres was especially dangerous, as it was shelled day and night, causing many casualties. The regimental aid station of the 16th Infantry at Mandres had at first functioned also as a dressing station, but on 1 March 1918, this service was taken over by Ambulance Company 2, until they, in turn, were relieved by Ambulance Company 3 on 27 March. The station treated chemical casualties as well as other cases and to a limited degree acted as a triage point. It was on the axial road and occupied a building whose walls had been protected by thick sandbags, but occasionally when receiving indirect fire it utilized a dugout which it had constructed nearby. Ambulance Company 13 operated ambulances from Menil-la-Tour and provided litter bearers to forward units until relieved by Ambulance Company 12 on 21 March 1918. That ambulance company, augmented by vehicles from other companies, maintained headquarters and an ambulance park at Menil-la-Tour, dispatching ambulances to the dressing station at Mandres and to forward units. Other ambulances were attached to unit aid stations at important points in rear areas of the sector.

Evacuation Ambulance Company 1 from the Services of Supply maintained two ambulances at Field Hospital 13 for evacuation to Sebastopol, where twenty ambulances were available for use during periods of heavy casualties.

The different ambulance circuits, in forward and rear areas, were established for dealing with battle casualties, with a third circuit for the routine sick. The front circuit was maintained by Ford ambulances working forward from Mandres and returning to deliver patients to the dressing station there. Pertaining to it were emergency ambulances stationed at Beaumont, Rambucourt, and Bouconville, and at times at Seicheprey, with reserve at Mandres. The advance point to which ambulances could go by daylight was on the Beaumont-Bouconville road paralleling the front line and 2 km from it. At night ambulances could be sent forward to Xivray-Marvoisin and Seicheprey, 1 km from the front line. When circumstances warranted the risk, ambulances stationed at Seicheprey could evacuate from Seicheprey by day, but not as a routine measure. The rear circuit of heavy G. M. C. ambulances began at Mandres, where patients were carried to a fixed evacuation hospital. In order to cut down transportation, patients who could stand the longer trip to Toul or to Sebastopol were sent directly from Mandres and were not required to stop at the triage at Menil-la-Tour. Patients were distributed from Mandres as follows: (1) Seriously wounded and sick who could not stand long ambulance transportation, to Menil-la-Tour; (2) chemical agent casualties to Menil-la-Tour; (3) surgical cases to Sebastopol; (4) and sick and contagious diseases to Toul. A few ambulances for this circuit were maintained at Mandres, with reserve at Menil-la-Tour. At times of expected periods of high casualties, the ambulance park was advanced to Hamonville, and ambulances and trucks were dispatched to Mandres as needed.

In quiet times a routine circuit of ambulances was maintained, daily calls being made at all aid stations within the division area that could be reached for the collection of sick and slightly wounded to be triaged at Menil-la-Tour, allowing placement of ambulances posted at outlying aid stations for emergency use.

Field Hospital 13 became operational on 17 January 1918 at Menil-la-Tour, in barracks taken over from a French field hospital and equipped for the care of 200 patients. This served at first as a divisional hospital and, after hospitals in the rear began functioning as a triage, for the reception of chemical casualties and some ill patients until relieved about 31 March by a field hospital of the 26th Division. The location was poorly suited for a hospital because of its proximity to a large supply dump and railhead subject to indirect fire. Several attacks occurred and missiles impacted within a hundred yards of the hospital, but no artillery fire was ever received.

Patients began to be received immediately after arrival of the 1st Division in the sector. Seven wounded were admitted on 21 January, and sixty-two chemical casualties on the 26th, the first chemical casualties in the division. Of the 674 patients received by Field Hospital 13, 323—nearly half of all patients treated—were due to chemical agents.

Field Hospital 12, after being held in reserve, became operational on 23 January at Sebastopol in large, permanent, stone barracks. It functioned as an evacuation and surgical hospital until relieved on 4 February by Evacuation Hospital 1, which then assumed responsibility for care of the seriously wounded. The field hospital personnel had been previously augmented by details from Ambulance Companies 3 and 13. Field Hospital 12 moved 6 February to a large stone barracks—Caserne la Marche—at Toul, where it established a 400-bed hospital for the divisional sick. Since the barracks were large and readily adapted for use as a hospital, the field hospitals here supplemented their normal equipment with the addition of large quantities of supplies suitable for the proper maintenance of a semi-permanent hospital. Field Hospital 2 arrived at Toul on 18 February and established an annex to Field Hospital 12 for the care of contagious cases. It operated until 2 April, when the annex was turned over to a hospital of the 26th Division.

Field Hospitals 12 and 13 evacuated by train from Toul to base hospitals in the rear those cases which did not require surgical attention at Evacuation Hospital 1. This continued until about 3 April, when the facilities were turned over to hospitals of the 26th Division. In this sector Field Hospital 13 received 889 patients (not including those triaged directly to other hospitals) and Field Hospitals 12 and 2 received a combined total of 2,482 patients. As Evacuation Hospital 1 received most of the wounded, their patients were primarily those that were ill, and chemical casualties.

The sick rate of the division was three times that for battle casualties. More than two-thirds of those cases were minor, and most of the patients were returned to duty in a short time directly from the field hospitals. The prevailing diseases in the division in the sector were respiratory or intestinal. Sporadic cases of cerebrospinal meningitis, diphtheria, scarlet fever, mumps, and measles occurred, but no epidemic developed. A camp for venereal cases was established southeast of Raulecourt, and patients who were able to do so were put to work as laborers on road construction and similar heavy work.

The medical supply unit of the division, with a large stock, was maintained at Demange-aux-Eaux in the division rear. An advance medical supply depot was operated by Field Hospital 13 at Menil-la-Tour for issue to all organizations in advance areas. An advance subdepot was maintained at the dressing station at Mandres, for the distribution of supplies by ambulance or runners to front-line aid stations.

The 1st Division was relieved 1–3 April 1918, by the 26th Division and proceeded to the neighborhood of Chaumont-en-Vexin, where headquarters were established 8 April. For the next 10 days the division was trained in open warfare, activities consisting chiefly of brigade and division maneuvers. Regiments evacuated the disabled directly into the French hospitals at Gisors.

==== Cantigny Sector ====
The offensive launched by the Germans on 21 March 1918 placed the Allies in a desperate situation. The lack of complete cooperation among the Allies on the Western Front had been appreciated, and the question of preparation to meet the crisis had already received attention of the supreme war council. Reserves were not available and on 28 March, the 1st Division was placed at the disposal of the allied high command, starting movement toward the battle front on 17 April. On 25 April it took over the Cantigny sector 4.9 km west of Montdidier, relieving French troops and becoming a part of the French First Army. During the first six weeks that the division remained in this line the sector was very active; the remaining period was active. Battery positions were made untenable by high-explosive and chemical shells. Air raids were frequent and severe.

On 27 May 1918, the Germans attacked Chateau-Thierry, and when the French appreciated how serious and how successful the attack was they began to withdraw both their air squadrons and supporting artillery from the Cantigny sector. On the 28th the 1st Division made the first sustained American offensive of the war and captured the village of Cantigny—a date later chosen by the 1st Medical Regiment as its Organization Day. Because of determined German efforts to retake the salient, losses were greater after the attack than during it. Beauvais, where a Red Cross hospital was located 38.4 km to the rear, suffered very severely. Hospitals were not immune from attack, and operation of the evacuation system, particularly at night, was very difficult.

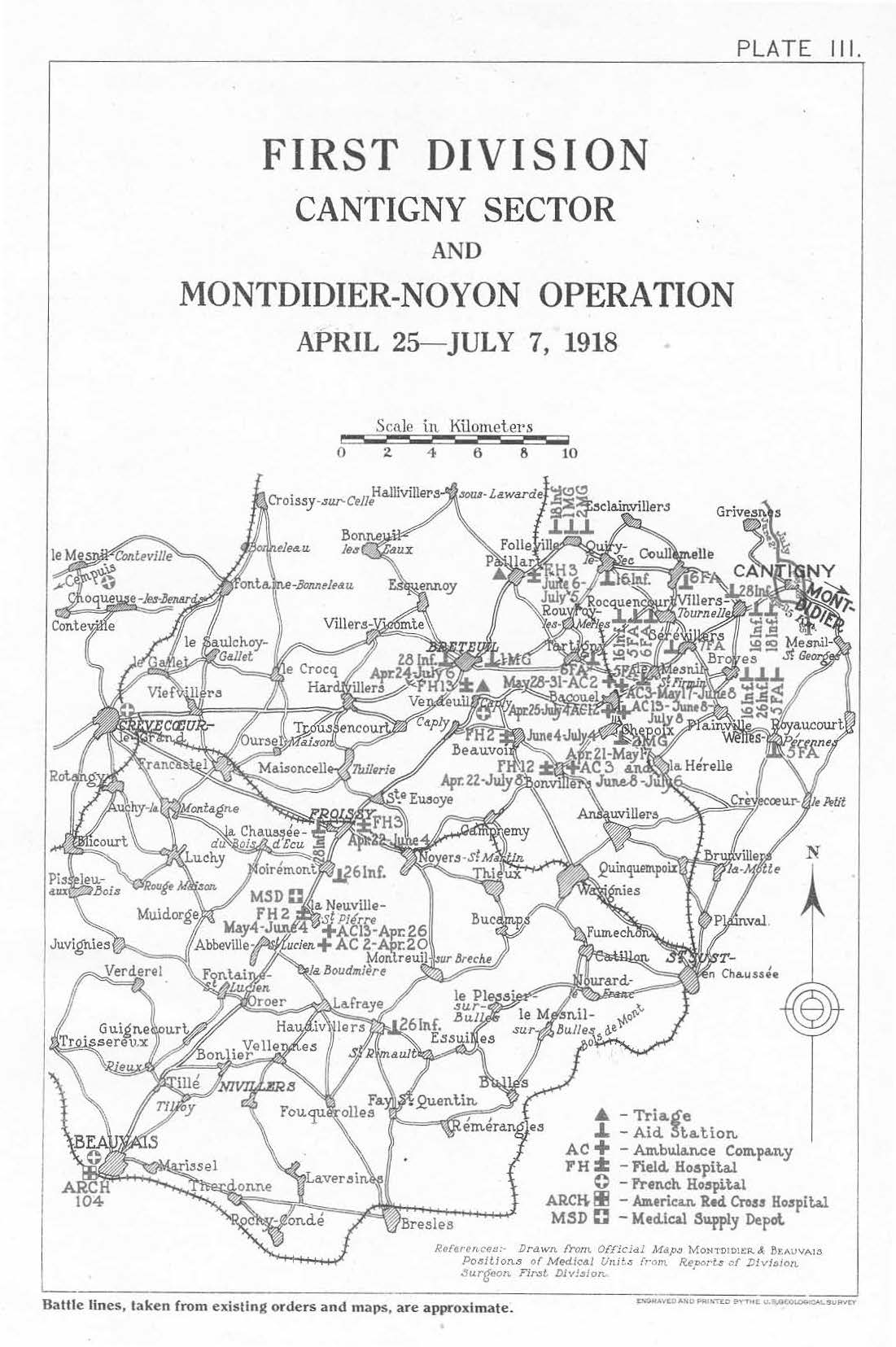
Map showing the location of medical units of the 1st Division, AEF, during operations near Cantigny and Montdidier-Noyon

==== Meuse-Argonne ====
After the Armistice was signed, the 1st Sanitary train marched with the rest of the 1st Division to the Coblenz Bridgehead as part of the US Third Army, which served as part of the Army of Occupation.

=== Interwar period ===
The 1st Sanitary Train arrived at the port of Hoboken, New Jersey, on 5 September 1919 on the troopship USS DeKalb after nine months of occupation duty near Koblenz, Germany. It participated in the 1st Division victory parades down Fifth Avenue in New York City on 10 September 1919 and in Washington, D.C., on 17 September 1919. It was temporarily posted to Camp George G. Meade, Maryland, where emergency period personnel were discharged from the service. It was transferred to Camp Zachary Taylor, Kentucky, and arrived there in October 1919. Transferred in September 1920 to Camp Dix, New Jersey. Reorganized and redesignated 10 February 1921 as the 1st Medical Regiment. Transferred 15 June 1922 to Carlisle Barracks, Pennsylvania.

==== Supporting the Medical Field Service School ====
In support of the 1929 class of the Officer Basic Course at the Medical Field Service School, the regiment accompanied the students—all officers—on their field training exercise, this year conducted on the battlefield at Gettysburg. Students worked problems involving terrain exercises, while the 1st Medical Regiment then demonstrated the approved school solution.

By 1930, the regiment was well integrated into the activities of the school. The regiment was maintained at "full peacetime strength," which equated to the regimental headquarters, a service company, a hospital company, a collecting company, a veterinary company, and two ambulance companies—one motorized and one animal drawn. In addition to serving as the demonstration unit for the school, most of the officers and noncommissioned officers who taught there were drawn from the ranks of the regiment, and senior officers in the regiment frequently moved into department directors in the school after completing their time in the regiment. The Medical Equipment Laboratory, charged with studying and developing equipment and transportation for medical department troops and installations frequently turned to the regiment for assistance in testing equipment in the field, particularly for battalion aid stations and equipment used by the medical regiments of the divisions.

==== The Ohio river floods, 1937 ====
In January and February 1937, the Ohio and Mississippi rivers flooded over 12,700 square miles in twelve states. As part of the Federal response, The 1st Medical Regiment's Company G (Hospital), under the command of Captain Alvin L. Gorby (who would later command the regiment, and who retired as a major general) arrived by train on 30 January. The company included six medical corps officers and 93 enlisted men, with another 21 enlisted and ten ambulances from the regiment's Company E (Motor Ambulance), who were sent to Fort Benjamin Harrison, Indiana to provide support in that area. Inspecting a school building which had been used as an improvised hospital for the prior week by local volunteers, he found it an excellent facility with a modern structure, indoor plumbing, and a cafeteria. Moving his soldiers into rooms on the top floor, he quickly established hospital operations, reorganizing what he found on arrival was an "appalling lack of organization." When the water pressure proved to be inadequate, he had his troops dig latrines on the school grounds and had water for other purposes trucked in.

Once that hospital was up and running, the company assumed responsibility for a typhoid inoculation station, then repaired and reorganized a second school which was being used as a segregated facility for black patients. During the 13 days the company operated in Louisville, they provided more than 5,000 inoculations and provided over 2,000 patient-days of care in the two improvised hospitals they were running. This relief operation would be the Army's last major domestic relief operation before the start of the World War II.

=== World War II ===
The 1st Medical Regiment was relieved from the 1st Division on 8 October 1939 and assigned to the IV Corps. It was reorganized on 1 March 1940, relieved from the IV Corps, and assigned to the Fourth Army. Transferred on 15 June 1940 to Fort Ord, California.

=== Supporting NATO ===
During most of September 1950 the 1st Medical Group participated in a major exercise called "Rainbow." Following spring 1950 a command post exercise named "Shamrock," this exercise saw most of the US medical units in Germany deploy their headquarters elements to the field, as well as sending as many operational elements as could be spared. Although medical play within the Communications Zone was simulated, soldiers role playing as patients were moved between the units in the field in Germany. In all, 40% of all Medical Corps and 20% of all Nurse Corps officers in Germany participated, with most units, according to published reports, rated as "Excellent" in their performance.

=== Fort Sam Houston ===
One of the responsibilities of the 1st Medical Group and its subordinate units at Fort Sam Houston, Texas, was to serve as a test-bed for the Medical Equipment Test and Evaluation Division of the United States Army Medical Materiel Agency. Established in 1964 and based at Fort Sam Houston, the test and evaluation division was responsible for testing new medical products and equipment for suitability for the Army's use. Much as they had done at Carlisle Barracks decades earlier, the 1st Medical Group's units at Fort Sam Houston, including a MUST equipped combat support hospital and an air ambulance company, provided a readily available platform for testing equipment under field conditions.

== Subordinate units ==
=== World War II ===
==== 1 February 1945 ====
- 1st Medical Group
  - 183rd Medical Battalion
    - 442nd Medical Company (Collecting)
    - 472nd Medical Company (Ambulance)
    - 626th Medical Company (Clearing)
  - 430th Medical Battalion
    - 462nd Medical Company (Collecting)
    - 488th Medical Company (Ambulance)

==== 1 March 1945 ====
- 1st Medical Group
  - 183rd Medical Battalion
    - 442nd Medical Company (Collecting)
    - 462nd Medical Company (Collecting)
    - 626th Medical Company (Clearing)
  - 188th Medical Battalion
    - 463rd Medical Company (Collecting)
    - 472nd Medical Company (Ambulance)
  - 430th Medical Battalion
    - 415th Medical Company (Collecting)
    - 488th Medical Company (Ambulance)
    - 489th Medical Company (Ambulance)

==== 23 March 1945 ====
- 1st Medical Group
  - 20th Field Hospital
  - 188th Medical Battalion
    - 463rd Medical Company (Collecting)
    - 472nd Medical Company (Ambulance)
    - 565th Medical Company (Ambulance)
  - 430th Medical Battalion
    - 462nd Medical Company (Collecting)
    - 488th Medical Company (Ambulance)
    - 489th Medical Company (Ambulance)

==== 1 May 1945 ====
- 1st Medical Group
  - 48th Field Hospital
  - 183rd Medical Battalion
    - 442nd Medical Company (Collecting)
    - 463rd Medical Company (Collecting)
    - 626th Medical Company (Clearing)
  - 185th Medical Battalion
    - Ambulance Platoon, 445th Medical Company (Collecting)
    - 627th Medical Company (Clearing)
  - 430th Medical Battalion
    - 95th Medical Battalion (Gas Treatment) (operational control)
    - 415th Medical Company (Collecting)
    - 462nd Medical Company (Collecting)
    - 481st Medical Company (Collecting)
    - 488th Medical Company (Ambulance)
    - 666th Medical Company (Clearing)

=== Cold War ===
==== Frankfurt, 10 June 1950 ====
1st Medical Group

- HHD, 1st Medical Group
- 9th General Dispensary
- 548th Medical Company (Clearing) (Separate)
- 563rd Dental Prosthetic Detachment (Fixed)
- 564th Dental Prosthetic Detachment (Mobile)
- 581st Medical Company (Ambulance)

=== Southwest Asia ===
==== Operation Desert Shield ====
- 1st Medical Group
  - 41st Combat Support Hospital
  - 46th Combat Support Hospital
  - 47th Combat Support Hospital
  - 34th Medical Battalion
    - 498th Medical Company (Air Ambulance)
    - 36th Medical Detachment (RG)--UH-60 Aircraft
    - 57th Medical Detachment (RG)--UH-60 Aircraft
    - 82nd Medical Detachment (RA)--UH-1 Aircraft
    - 440th Medical Detachment (RE)
  - 85th Medical Battalion
    - 517th Medical Company (Clearing)
    - 547th Medical Company (Clearing)
    - 595th Medical Company (Clearing)
    - 702nd Medical Company (Clearing)
    - 690th Medical Company (Ambulance)

==== Operation Desert Storm ====
- 1st Medical Group
  - 2nd Mobile Army Surgical Hospital
  - 5th Mobile Army Surgical Hospital
    - 755th Medical Detachment (KA)
  - 10th Mobile Army Surgical Hospital
  - 28th Combat Support Hospital
    - 250th Medical Detachment (KB)
  - 41st Combat Support Hospital
  - 46th Combat Support Hospital
  - 47th Combat Support Hospital
  - 34th Medical Battalion
    - 498th Medical Company (Air Ambulance)
    - 690th Medical Company (Ambulance)
    - 36th Medical Detachment (RG)--UH-60 Aircraft
    - 57th Medical Detachment (RG)--UH-60 Aircraft
    - 82nd Medical Detachment (RA)--UH-1 Aircraft
    - 374th Medical Detachment (RA)--UH-1 Aircraft
  - 85th Medical Battalion
    - 517th Medical Company (Clearing)
    - 547th Medical Company (Clearing)
    - 595th Medical Company (Clearing)
    - 702nd Medical Company (Clearing)
    - 685th Medical Company (Ambulance)
    - 440th Medical Detachment (RE)
  - 274th Medical Detachment (KA)
  - 248th Medical Detachment (JA)
  - 628th Medical Detachment (OM)

=== Current ===
Units of the 1st Medical Brigade:

- Headquarters Company Fort Hood, Texas
- 9th Hospital Center, at Fort Hood, Texas
  - 11th Field Hospital
    - 151st Medical Detachment
    - 198th Medical Detachment
    - 756th Medical Detachment
  - 36th FRSD
  - 43rd VET
  - 85th COSC
  - 126th FRSD
  - 555th FRSD
- 61st Multifunctional Medical Battalion, at Fort Hood, Texas
  - 176th OPT
  - 224th PM
  - 546th MCAS
  - 566th MCAS
  - 581st MCAS
  - 582nd MLC
  - 932nd BSD
- 528th Hospital Center, at Fort Bliss, Texas
  - 10th FRSD
  - 37th MED
  - 131st Field Hospital
  - 257th MED
  - 745 FRSD
- 502nd DCAS

== Former Commanders ==
Image	Rank	Name	Branch	Begin date	End date	Notes
	Colonel	Bailey K. Ashford	MC	3 August 1917	23 November 1917	Ashford's primary duty was as the Division Surgeon.
	Major	Charles Carroll Demmer	MC	24 November 1917	31 December 1917	A new Table of Organization authorized separate positions for the commander of the 1st Sanitary Train and the 1st Division Surgeon; Ashford remained the Division Surgeon.
	Major	Harry G. Ford	MC	1 January 1918	26 February 1918	
	Colonel	James I. Mabee	MC	1 March 1918	31 August 1918	
	Major	Edwin B. Maynard Jr.	MC	1 September 1918	16 October 1918	Major Maynard received the Silver Star for gallantry in action on 18–21 July 1918 for recovering wounded from the battlefield while assigned to the 1st Sanitary Train
	Lieutenant Colonel	Herbert C. Wolley	MC	20 February 1918	August 1919	
	Major	Joseph E. Bastion	MC	November 1919	August 1920	Promoted to Brigadier General 23 June 1943; Served as Commanding General, Percy Jones General Hospital, Battle Creek, Michigan.
	Major	Henry S. Beckford	MC	August 1920	September 1920	
	Major	Wood S. Woolford	MC	1 September 1920		Served with the Army Air Forces in World War II and transferred to the United States Air Force upon its formation, retiring as a colonel.
				10 February 1921		Reorganized and Redesignated 1st Medical Regiment
	Lieutenant Colonel	Frank A. Pyles	MC	6 October 1921	3 February 1922	
	Captain	William C. Russell	MC	4 February 1922	23 August 1922	
	Captain	John J. Carden	MC	23 August 1922	9 November 1922	
	Major	Joseph E. Bastion	MC	10 November 1922	18 July 1923	Major Bastion had previously commanded the 1st Sanitary Train in France. Promoted to Brigadier General 23 June 1943; Served as Commanding General, Percy Jones General Hospital, Battle Creek, Michigan.
	Major	Garfield L. McKinney	MC	19 July 1923	19 July 1928	
	Major	Robert P. Williams	MC	19 July 1928	26 July 1928	Promoted to Brigadier General 27 May 1949.
	Major	John M. Willis	MC	26 July 1928	30 August 1929	Command Surgeon, United States Army Pacific Ocean Areas; Namesake of Willis Hall, United States Army Medical Department Center and School, Fort Sam Houston, Texas
	Major	Frank S. Matlack	MC	30 August 1929	31 July 1930	
	Lieutenant Colonel	Larry B. McAfee	MC	1 August 1930	30 August 1930	Promoted to Brigadier General 1 March 1941. Executive Officer to the Surgeon General; Assistant Surgeon General; Commanding General, Bruns General Hospital, Santa Fe, New Mexico
	Major	Frank S. Matlack	MC	30 August 1930	5 June 1933	
	Major	Jacob L. Hartman	VC	6 June 1933	30 November 1933	Promoted to Brigadier General 3 March 1953; Chief, Army Veterinary Corps
	Major	Frank S. Matlack	MC	30 November 1933	24 June 1934	
	Lieutenant Colonel	Lanphear W. Webb Jr.	MC	24 June 1934	1 December 1935	
	Major	Howard T. Wickert	MC	2 December 1935	31 August 1938	
	Lieutenant Colonel	George F. Lull	MC	7 September 1936	30 June 1937	Promoted to Brigadier General 11 March 1943; Promoted to Major General 24 September 1943. Deputy Army Surgeon General
	Lieutenant Colonel	Paul R. Hawley	MC	1 July 1937	31 August 1938	Promoted to Brigadier General 10 September 1942; Promoted to Major General 27 February 1944. Chief Surgeon, European Theater of Operations; Acting Medical Director, Veterans Administration under Omar Bradley.
	Major	Alvin L. Gorby	MC	31 August 1938	7 June 1940	Promoted to Brigadier General 11 September 1951; Promoted to Major General 7 May 1954.Second Army Surgeon; Senior Medical Advisor, Office of the Assistant Secretary of Defense (Health Affairs); Deputy Commander, Walter Reed Army Medical Center; Chief Surgeon, US Army Europe; Commanding General, Valley Forge General Hospital.
	Lieutenant Colonel	Robert P. Williams	MC	8 June 1940	24 September 1940	Promoted to Brigadier General 27 May 1949.
	Colonel	Wilson C. von Kessler	MC	24 September 1940	18 December 1940	
	Lieutenant Colonel	Paul R. E. Sheppard	MC	18 December 1940	30 November 1941	
	Major	John B. Minna	MC	1 December 1941	8 December 1941	
	Major	Paul H. Martin	MC	9 December 1941	20 February 1942	
	Colonel	Harry H. Towler	MC	21 February 1942	14 June 1942	
	Major	Eaton W. Bennett	MC	15 June 1942	26 August 1942	
	Colonel	Robert B. Skinner	MC	27 August 1942	21 May 1943	Promoted to Brigadier General 31 October 1959; commander, 9th Hospital Center, USAREUR; commander, Fitzsimmons General Hospital.
	Lieutenant Colonel	Benjamin Woro	MC	22 May 1943	16 June 1943	
	Lieutenant Colonel	Charles W. Mason	MC	17 June 1943	26 July 1943	
	Lieutenant Colonel	Glenn J. Collins	MC	27 July 1943	7 August 1943	Promoted to Brigadier General 25 October 1965; Promoted to Major General 1 August 1968. As a brigadier general, Collins would command the 44th Medical Brigade in the Republic of Vietnam. As a major general, he would command the Walter Reed Army Medical Center and serve as Deputy Army Surgeon General.
				1 September 1943		Reorganized and Redesignated 1st Medical Group
	Colonel	Lester P. Viegel	MC	7 August 1943	16 October 1945	Colonel Viegel transferred to the United States Air Force upon its creation and died while still on active duty in 1959.
	Captain	Harry L. Gans	MAC	16 October 1945	12 November 1945	Captain Gans served as the Headquarters Detachment commander and assumed command of the Group when all the other headquarters officers were released. He would again command the Group in 1971–1972, making his first and last assignments as a commissioned officer in the 1st Medical Group.
				12 November 1945	10 June 1950	Inactivated
	Colonel	John Lemoin Crawford	MC	10 June 1950		Promoted to brigadier general, Army of the United States 25 June 1968, commanded 9th Hospital Center in Germany and Madigan General Hospital, Fort Lewis, Washington
	Colonel	Albert H. Robinson	MC	May 1953		
	Lieutenant Colonel	Edwin H. Czapla	MS	11 November 1954		
	Lieutenant Colonel	John A. Mikuluk	MS	2 November 1955		
	Colonel	Joseph T. Caples	MC	1 September 1957	8 February 1959	
	Lieutenant Colonel	Norman Lepper	MC	9 February 1959	22 April 1959	
	Colonel	Joseph K. Bayne	MC	23 April 1959	5 August 1960	Also served as Command Surgeon, Theater Support Command (TASCOM), Verdun, France
	Major	Samuel M. Allen	MC	6 August 1960	19 August 1960	
	Colonel	Andrew F. Scheele	MC	19 August 1960		Also served as commander of the 42nd Field Hospital, Verdun, France. Scheele was a veteran of both Pearl Harbor and the Normandy landings.
	Colonel	John H. Taber	MC	10 July 1961		
				24 March 1962	3 January 1968	Inactivated
	Colonel	John E. Burns	MS	3 January 1968	31 August 1968	
	Colonel	William E. Schlarb	MS	1 September 1968	15 April 1971	
	Colonel	Raymond P. Bosworth	MS	15 April 1971	18 August 1971	
	Colonel	Harry L. Gans	MS	18 August 1971	28 December 1972	COL Gans also briefly commanded the Group in 1945, as a captain, during its inactivation.
	Colonel	Will J. Cummings	MS	29 December 1972	20 September 1977	
	Colonel	George R. Lynch	MS	21 September 1977	14 February 1979	
	Colonel	Homer B. Moran	MS	15 February 1979	30 June 1980	
	Colonel	Edward R. Pedersen	MS	1 July 1980	13 August 1981	
	Colonel	John R. Sperandio	MS	14 August 1981	12 July 1983	Namesake of the John R. Sperandio Medical Plans, Operations, Training, Security, and Intelligence Professional Short Course, sponsored by the Office of the Army Surgeon General.
	Colonel	John S. Timberlake III	MS	13 July 1983	12 July 1985	
	Colonel	Henry J. Waters	MS	12 July 1985	6 August 1987	Colonel Waters originated the nickname "Silver Knights."
	Colonel	James R. Sawyer	MS	7 August 1987	1989	
	Colonel	Eldon H. Ideus	MS	1989	2 August 1991	
	Colonel	David C. Jackson	MS	2 August 1991	6 August 1993	
	Colonel	Robert D. Deaderick	MS	6 August 1993	1995	
	Colonel	Frank Novier	MS	1995	1997	
	Colonel	Emil F. Meis	MS	1997	1999	
	Colonel	Johnny L. West	MS	1999	10 July 2001	
				6 June 2000		Reorganized and Redesignated 1st Medical Brigade
	Colonel	Joseph C. Hightower	MS	19 July 2001	18 July 2003	
	Colonel	Terry Walters	MC	18 July 2003	5 June 2005	Colonel Waters graduated the United States Military Academy in the first class of female graduates.
	Colonel	James Rice	MS	5 June 2005	16 August 2007	
	Colonel	Robert D. Tenhet	MS	16 August 2007	1 June 2010	Later promoted to major general and served as Deputy Army Surgeon General.
	Lieutenant Colonel	Lee Roupe	MS	1 June 2010	23 July 2010	
	Colonel	Bruce W. McVeigh	MS	23 July 2010	16 January 2013	
	Colonel	Bertram C. Providence	MC	16 January 2013	27 June 2014	Promoted to brigadier general on 2 November 2014.
	Colonel	Allen J. Darden Sr.	MS	27 June 2014	28 June 2016	
	Colonel	Anthony R. Nesbitt	MS	28 June 2016	17 January 2019	
	Colonel	Robert F. Howe II	MS	17 January 2019	14 January 2021	
	Colonel	Roger Giraud	MS	14 January 2021	29 June 2022	
	Colonel	Tracy Michael	MS	29 June 2022	27 June 2024	Promoted to the rank of Brigadier General 25 June 2026
	Colonel	Werner J. Barden	MS	27 June 2024	29 May 2026	
	Colonel	Matthew H. Hoefer	MC	29 May 2026	Current	Board certified in Aerospace Medicine and Occupational Medicine. Managed DOD/NATO level program for ionizing radiation countermeasures, therapies and policy.

== Lineage ==
Constituted 3 August 1917 in the Regular Army as Headquarters, 1st Sanitary Train, assigned to the 1st Expeditionary Division and organized at New York, New York. (1st Expeditionary Division redesignated 6 July 1918 as 1st Division.)

Redesignated 10 February 1921 as Headquarters, 1st Medical Regiment.

Relieved from the 1st Division, consolidated with Service Company, 1st Medical Regiment (organized during June 1925 at Carlisle Barracks, Pennsylvania by consolidation of Headquarters Detachment, Medical Laboratory Section, and Medical Supply Section, 1st Medical Regiment.

Reorganized and redesignated 8 October 1939 as Headquarters, Headquarters and Service Company, 1st Medical Regiment (Corps).

Redesignated 16 December 1940 Headquarters, Headquarters and Service Company, 1st Medical Regiment (Army).

Reorganized and redesignated 1 September 1943 as Headquarters and Headquarters Detachment, 1st Medical Group.

Inactivated 12 November 1945 in Fort Benning, Georgia

Activated 10 June 1950 in Frankfurt, Federal Republic of Germany

Inactivated 24 March 1962 in Verdun, France.

Activated 3 January 1968 at Fort Sam Houston, Texas.

Reorganized and redesignated 6 June 2000 as Headquarters and Headquarters Company, 1st Medical Brigade

== Honors ==
=== Campaign participation credit ===
- World War I:
1. Lorraine
2. Montdidier-Noyon
3. Picardy
4. Aisne-Marne
5. Saint-Mihiel
6. Meuse-Argonne
- World War II:
1. Rhineland
2. Central Europe
- Southwest Asia:
1. Defense of Saudi Arabia;
2. Liberation and Defense of Kuwait

=== Decorations ===
- Meritorious Unit Commendation:
1. Southwest Asia 1990–1991
2. Southwest Asia 2003
3. Southwest Asia 2006
4. Southwest Asia 2010
5. Afghanistan 2012

== Insignia ==
=== Shoulder sleeve insignia ===
- Description/Blazon

On a white rectangle arced at top and bottom with a 1/8 inch (.32 cm) yellow border, 2 inches (5.08 cm) in width and 3 inches (7.62 cm) in height overall, a maroon cross throughout bearing a yellow rod entwined by a green snake with a red eye.

- Symbolism

Maroon and white are the colors used by the Army Medical Department units; gold is for excellence. The staff of Aesculapius and the maroon cross, symbolize the medical arts and allude to the mission of the Brigade.

- Background

The shoulder sleeve insignia was authorized effective 6 June 2000. (TIOH Dwg. No. A-1-844)

=== Distinctive unit insignia ===
- Description/Blazon

A maroon shield bearing within a wreath of silver oak leaves the helmet of an esquire charged with the shoulder sleeve insignia of the First Division, a shield with the figure "1." All above a silver scroll bearing the inscription "FORTITUDE AND COMPASSION" in black letters.

- Symbolism

Maroon and white (silver) are the colors used for the Army Medical Service. The red numeral "1" on an olive drab shield is the shoulder sleeve insignia of the 1st Division as authorized 31 October 1918, and with which the unit served in World War I. The helmet indicates the military character of the organization.

- Background

The distinctive unit insignia was originally approved for the 1st Medical Regiment on 19 December 1923.
It was redesignated and amended to include a motto for the 1st Medical Group on 20 March 1968.
The insignia was amended to correct the symbolism on 26 April 1968.
It was redesignated for the 1st Medical Brigade effective 6 June 2000.
