= 28th Combat Support Hospital (United States) =

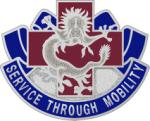
- Distinctive unit insignia
- Active: 1943–45; 1967–2020
- Country: United States
- Branch: United States Army
- Type: Combat Support Hospital
- Size: ~500–600 personnel authorized strength
- Part of: 44th Medical Brigade
- Garrison/HQ: Fort Bragg, North Carolina
- Nickname(s): China Dragons (special designation); Sky Medics
- Motto(s): Service through Mobility
- Colors: Maroon, Red, White, Blue, Black
- Engagements: World War II: China Defensive; China Offensive; Gulf War: Defense of Saudi Arabia; Liberation and Defense of Kuwait; Iraq War; Operation New Dawn Afghanistan

Commanders
- Current commander: COL Laurel Neff
- Deputy Commander Nurse: COL John Kulig
- Command Sergeant Major: CSM John Dobbins
- Notable commanders: MG Philip Volpe; BG Rhonda Cornum

The 28th Combat Support Hospital (28th CSH) was a Combat Support Hospital of the United States Army. It was first constituted in 1943 and served in China during World War II. During the Gulf War in 1990, it was the first Army hospital unit established and deployed into Iraq with combat forces of the XVIII Airborne Corps. More recently it has been involved in relief operations following natural disasters and has undertaken several recent deployments to Iraq. The unit fell under the command of the 44th Medical Brigade and was based at Fort Bragg, North Carolina.

As part of an Army wide force restructuring, the 28th Combat Support Hospital was reorganized and redesignated as the 528th Field Hospital in April 2020. Its assets were also used to resource the 16th Hospital Center, the 437th Medical Detachment (Surgical), the 430th Medical Detachment, and the 131st Medical Detachment.

== History ==
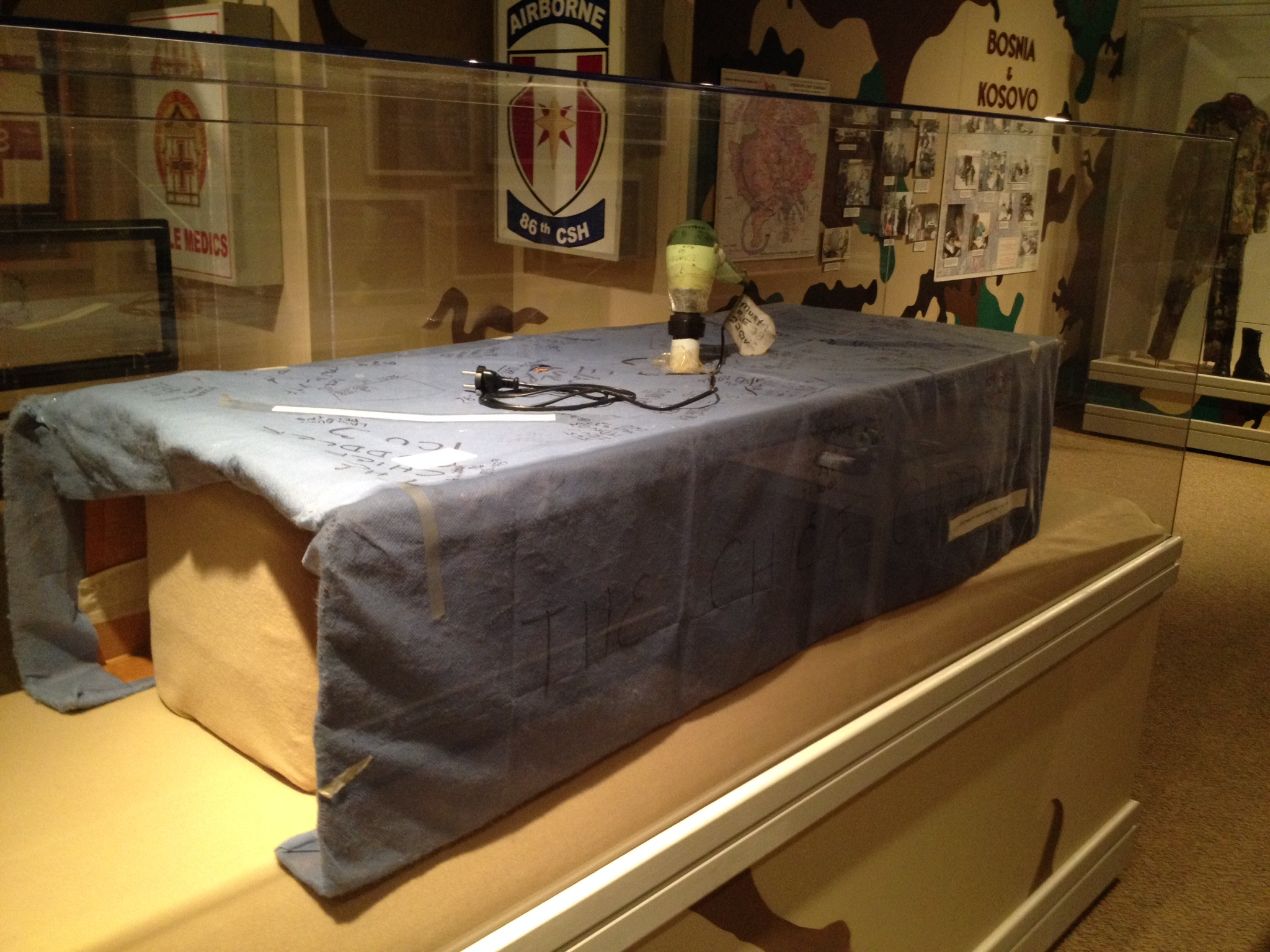
The "Chief Cuddler" on display at Fort Sam Houston. Made by Staff Sgt. Adam R. Irby a member of the 28th Combat Support Hospital, to safely rewarm patients in the Surgical Intensive Care Unit in Iraq in 2003.

The 28th Combat Support Hospital was originally constituted on 25 May 1943. It was activated the following month in the Army of the United States as the 28th Portable Surgical Hospital based at Fort George G. Meade, Maryland. Following this it was deployed to the China Burma India Theater of World War II for which it was awarded two campaign participation credits: "China Defensive" and "China Offensive". For their involvement in the campaign the unit received the special designation of the "China Dragons". Following the end of hostilities, the unit was inactivated on 20 December 1945 in India.

With the expansion of the United States' involvement in the Vietnam War, the decision was made to reactivate the unit in 1967. This occurred on 25 July, however, prior to that occurring, the unit was officially redesignated as the 28th Surgical Hospital on 18 April 1967 and allotted to the Regular Army. Upon reactivation, the 28th was stationed at Fort Bragg, North Carolina, and was brought up to operational status, fielding the Medical Unit, Self-contained, Transportable (MUST) system, which replaced the equipment sets that the Surgical Hospitals had previously been using. On 21 December 1972, the unit was reorganized and redesignated as the 28th Combat Support Hospital.

In 1990, the 28th CSH deployed to Southwest Asia as part of the US contribution to the Gulf War. They were the first Army hospital to be set up during Operation Desert Shield and later during the ground operations phase of the conflict, the 28th CSH crossed into Iraq in support of the XVIII Airborne Corps. Prior to the deployment, the hospital was still equipped with the old MUST equipment as it had not been scheduled to receive the new Deployable Medical System (DEPMEDS) equipment until 1992, however, due to the urgency of the situation they were rapidly re-equipped. The 28th CSH remained in Iraq for a month following the end of the war, during which time it treated a number of Iraqi civilians and prisoners of war. For its involvement in the Gulf War, the 28th CSH received two campaign participation credits: "Defense of Saudi Arabia" and "Liberation and Defense of Kuwait".

Following this the unit returned to the United States, after which it undertook a number of disaster relief operations. In the aftermath of Hurricane Andrew, the unit was deployed to Homestead, Florida in August 1992 to provide assistance. Later, in September 1994, the 28th CSH deployed to Haiti in support of Operation Uphold Democracy. They also deployed to St. Thomas, in the United States Virgin Islands, in October 1995 to support the Hurricane Marilyn relief operations.

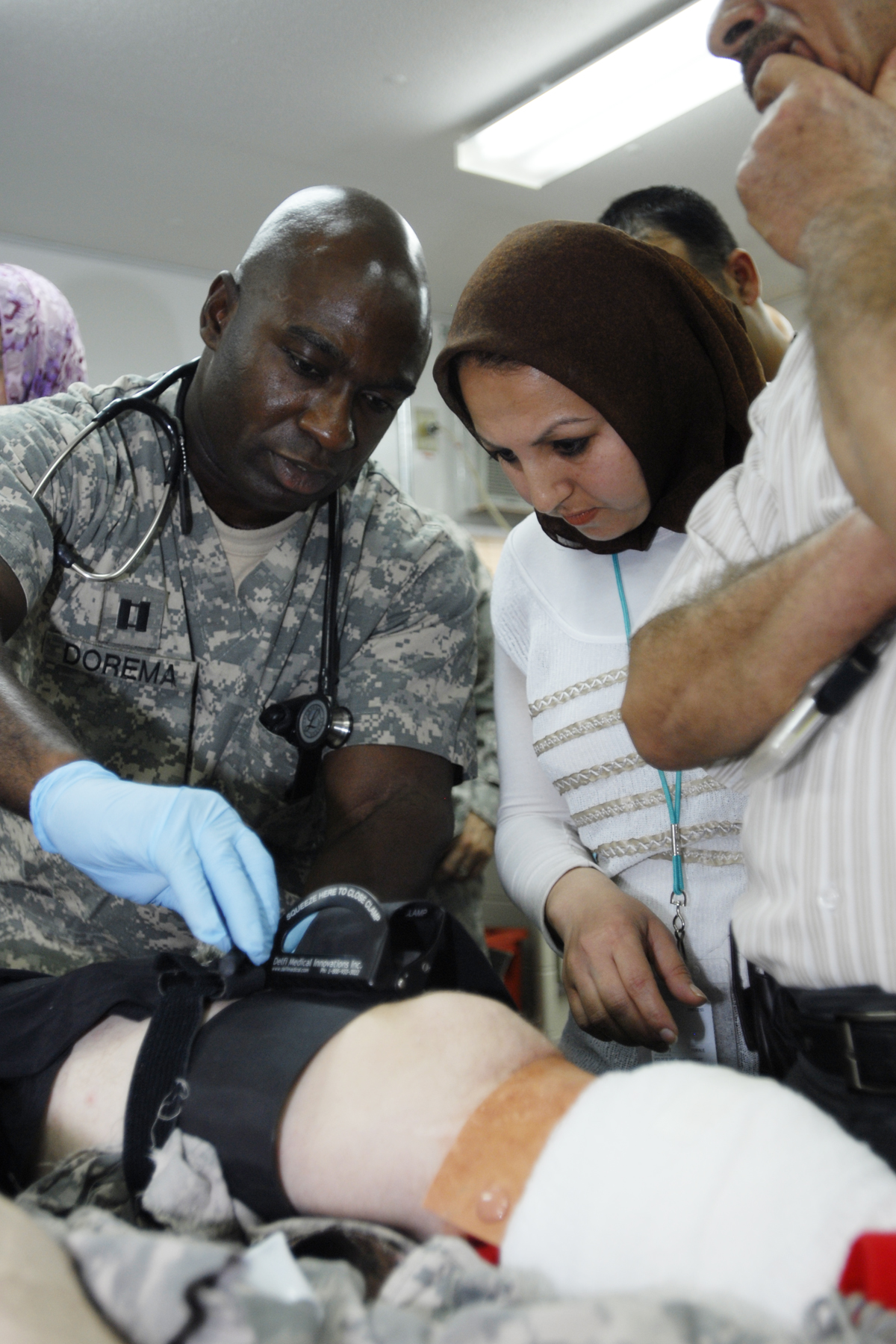
Captain Ernest Dorema, an officer in charge of the emergency room at the 28th Combat Support Hospital shows Sinna Abdul Azeez, an anesthesiologist with Yarmouk Hospital, how to use a Combat Application Tourniquet on the leg of a mock casualty during an exercise as a part of Operation Medical Alliance held at Sather Air Base, 7 April 2007.

In 2001, the 28th CSH was deployed to the Balkans before taking part in the 2003 invasion of Iraq. Subsequently, they established themselves in an Iraqi hospital in the Green Zone in Baghdad. In 2006, the unit was deployed to Baghdad, undertaking a 15-month tour stationed at Ibn Sina Hospital. In October 2009, the 28th Combat Support Hospital deployed in support of Operation Iraqi Freedom where it operated medical treatment facilities in several different locations around the country providing health care to service members, DOD civilians, US contractors, third country nationals, Iraqi civilians, and many others. The 28th CSH continued to serve during Operation New Dawn and redeployed back to Ft. Bragg, North Carolina in October 2010 after 12 months of service.

In 2013–2014, 28 CSH deployed to Bagram, Afghanistan. Throughout the 12-month tour, they earned the nickname "Sky Medics".

In May 2016, a task force medical team from the 28th Combat Support Hospital deployed to Iraq. They were designated as Task Force Medical 28. TFMED28 was the first Role III CSH to come back into theater after the troop draw down to support Operation Inherent Resolve. They had built a Role III tent hospital to support all medical aspects of Iraq and Syria. The team redeployed in February 2017 and was replaced by a task force medical team from 21st Combat Support Hospital.

In October 2018, the 28 CSH hosted the FY 19 Fall XVIII Airborne Corps Expert Field Medical Badge (EFMB) on behalf of the 44th Medical Brigade on Fort Bragg. Despite the FY18 Army-wide EFMB statistics reflecting only a 13% pass rate, the first testing of FY19 produced 77 badge holders of the 255 candidates that were in-processed; resulting in a 30% pass rate.

In March 2019, the 28 CSH undertook a field Training Exercise (FTX) that incorporated nine internal units and 12 external units and organizations. As a result, the Emergency Medical Treatment (EMT) section incorporated Medical Hands-Free Unified Broadcast (MEDHUB) Operational Test and Telemedicine and Advanced Technology Research Center (TATRC); the Patient Administration Director (PAD) Section incorporated US Transportation Command Regulating Command and Control Evacuation System (TRAC2ES) via the 43rd Aeromedical Evacuation Squadron Aeromedical Evacuation Liaison Team (AELT) and Joint Patient Assessment Tracking System (JPATS); 690 Medical Company Ground Ambulance provided in-route care to multiple casualties from the Womack Army Medical Center (WAMC) MASCAL exercise from Point of Injury (POI) through all roles of care; incorporated Medical Hands-Free Unified Broadcast (MEDHUB) Operational Test. CLINOPS incorporated MTOE Assigned Personnel (MAPs) integration into the CSH, validated the FBNC Pre-hospitalization plan; executed the Capability Development Integration Directorate (CDID) proof of concept: 4-bed (FST w/ ICU) and further build to 10-bed w/ EMT+ PLX, eventually complexing a 44- bed hospital in under 72 hours, and conducted the second ever cadaver lab in the CSH footprint; which trained over 60 medical procedures needed to meet ICTLs. The Operations and Clinical Operations section planned and executed the first ever combined student liberation/ repatriation exercise with C/1-1 SWTG (A) SERE-C and C/3-82d GSAB Aeromedical evacuation (AE) assets; resulting in SERE students traveling from Role 1 to Role 3 medical care. The CSH S6 tested and validated the Tampa Microwave Local Area Network system with 50 Expeditionary Signal Battalion – Enhanced (ESB-E); provided feedback towards efforts to improve the Army's prototype (ESB-E) for future Signal operations.

In April 2020, the 28 CSH transformed into the 16th Hospital Center and 528th Field hospital in order to meet the demands of multi-domain battle and provide expeditionary Health Service Support and hospitalization. The mission is: deploy to provide mission command for up to two functioning Field Hospitals (32 BED). The subordinate Field Hospital will be the 528th Field Hospital. Their mission is to deploy to provide hospitalization (32 BED) and outpatient services to all classes of patients in a theater of operations. Under the 528th FH, there will be the 437th MED DET (SURG) with the mission: deploy to augment the capabilities of the Field Hospital (32 BED) with thoracic, urology, oral maxillofacial surgical capabilities, 24 additional ICU beds, outpatient services, and microbiology. The 430th MED DET and the 131 MED DET will have the mission: deploy to augment the Field Hospital (32 BED) with operational dental care, and provision of one additional ICU ward, one ICW ward, additional microbiology capabilities and outpatient services for all classes of patients within a theater of operations.

== Role and structure ==
The 28th Combat Support Hospital is currently attached to the 44th Medical Brigade and is based at Fort Bragg in North Carolina. Equipped with DEPMEDS equipment, it is tasked with providing Level III combat health support when deployed. (Note: Level III combat health support is defined as resuscitation, initial wound surgery and post operative treatment. Joint Doctrine for Civil-Military Operations, Annex A to Appendix C, pp. 1–2.) The DEPMEDS system consists of "canvas tents that are connected to hard-sided boxes" which, when fully established, requires an area of 25 acres (100,000 m^{2}), and provides a suite of medical facilities and support equipment that allows the unit to perform a large number of functions similar to that of more permanent facilities including pharmacology, radiology and surgery. It has a 296-bed capacity, although only 96 of these are able to be used for patients requiring intensive care. At the same time it maintains the ability to detach sub-units to task force level operations to provide front-line medical and surgical support. When the hospital is not deployed, or has not been assigned a patient care role, it is tasked with supporting the XVIII Airborne Corps, and undertaking a range of tasks as part of the Fort Bragg garrison.

The hospital has an authorized strength of between 500 and 600 personnel, of whom about 30 are physicians. However, when not deployed it consists only of a small cadre staff who undertake various administrative tasks to keep the unit operational, while the majority of its medical personnel are stationed elsewhere at permanent facilities where they can use their training on a daily basis. When the unit is warned out for deployment, however, these personnel are recalled to the unit. For a long period of time prior to the mid-1990s, the hospital was commanded by a Medical Service Corps officer who was responsible for maintaining the unit administratively, however, upon assuming a patient care role, a Medical Corps officer, who is a qualified physician, took over command of the unit. This policy was changed following the first Gulf War, however, and the current policy of the Army Medical Department is that all medical treatment facilities are considered to be "AMEDD Immaterial" commands, and may be commanded by officers of any of the six AMEDD Corps, and the commanders no longer swap-out when the hospital moves from a training status to an operational role.

The unit possesses its own command, management and administrative support elements and consists of the following sub-units:

- Headquarters and Headquarters Detachment (HHD)
- A Company
- B Company
- 759th Forward Surgical Team (Airborne)
- 240th Forward Surgical Team
- 274th Forward Surgical Team (Airborne)
- 541st Forward Resuscitative Surgical Team (Airborne)
- 432nd Blood Detachment
- 528th Combat Operations Stress Control
- 207th Med Team Head & Neck.

== Honors ==
=== Campaign participation credit ===
- World War II: China Defensive; China Offensive;
- Southwest Asia: Defense of Saudi Arabia; Liberation and Defense of Kuwait.
- Operation Inherent Resolve, Baghdad Diplomatic Support Center, Iraq 2016-17

=== Decorations ===
- Meritorious Unit Commendation (Army), Streamer embroidered FRANCE.
- Meritorious Unit Commendation (Army), Streamer embroidered IRAQ 2010.

== Distinctive unit insignia ==
=== Description ===
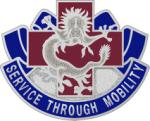
Distinctive Unit Insignia, 28th Combat Support Hospital

A silver color metal and epoxied device 1 3/16 inches (3.02 cm) in width overall consisting of a maroon Greek cross superimposed by a silver stylized Chinese dragon, all surmounting and above a blue scroll the ends of the scroll terminating at the upper ends of the cross and inscribed “SERVICE THROUGH MOBILITY” in silver letters

=== Symbolism ===
Maroon and white are the colors used for the Army Medical Department. The cross refers to the hospital and its mission. The Chinese dragon symbolizes the organization's service in the China Defensive Campaign, World War II.

=== Background ===
The distinctive unit insignia was originally approved for the 28th Surgical Hospital on 5 March 1970. It was redesignated for the 28th Combat Support Hospital on 2 January 1973, and further redesignated for the 528th Field Hospital in April 2020

=== Flag ===
Design as prescribed in accordance with Army Regulation 840–10.

== Notes ==
Footnotes

Citations
