= Paul Ramsey Hawley =

American physician

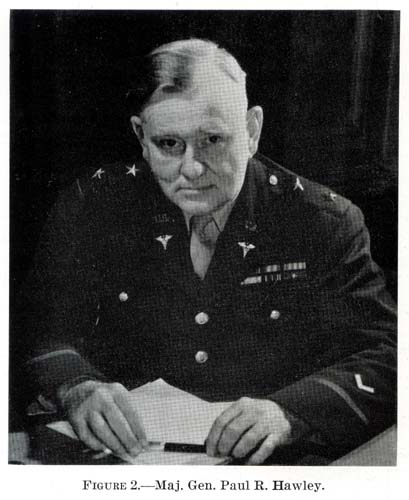
- Major General Paul Ramsey Hawley, Medical Corps, US Army
- Born: January 31, 1891; West College Corner, Indiana
- Died: November 24, 1965 (aged 74); Walter Reed Army Medical Center, Washington, D.C.
- Burial place: Arlington National Cemetery
- Military career
- Allegiance: United States of America
- Branch: United States Army
- Service years: 1916–1946
- Rank: Major General
- Nickname: Ram
- Commands: 1st Medical Regiment; Medical Replacement Training Center, Fort Lee, Virginia
- Conflicts: World War I Second Nicaraguan Campaign; World War II
- Awards: Distinguished Service Medal; Legion of Merit; Bronze Star Medal
- Other work: Medical director, U.S. Veterans Administration chief executive officer Blue Cross/Blue Shield director, American College of Surgeons

Signature
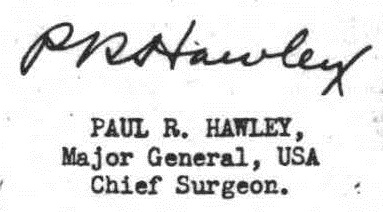

Paul Ramsey Hawley (January 31, 1891 – November 24, 1965) was an American physician who served as command surgeon of the European Theater of Operations, United States Army from January 1942 to May 1945. After the war, he was appointed as medical director of the U.S. Veterans Administration and chief executive officer of Blue Cross/Blue Shield.

== Education and early years, and family ==
Hawley was born in West College Corner, Indiana, on January 31, 1891, to William Harry Hawley and Sabrina Corey (Ramsey) Hawley. After graduating from the College Corner Union School, he enrolled in Indiana University’s Bloomington Campus—at that time, the University’s only campus. While there, he became a member of the Phi Delta Theta fraternity. Following his graduation with a Bachelor of Arts in 1912—with less than stellar performance, which he later attributed to his participation in the fraternity.--Hawley enrolled in the University of Cincinnati College of Medicine in Cincinnati, Ohio. He was awarded his MD degree in 1914 and then completed a 20-month internship at the Cincinnati General Hospital. Following in the footsteps of his father and grandfather, who were both physicians, he returned to West College Corner and joined his father's practice. He married Frances Katherine Gilliland on December 10, 1915, and they had two children, William Harry Hawley and Barbara Hawley, and both his son and son-in-law served as officers in the European Theater during World War II. He and his wife were divorced in 1951, and he remarried, to Lydia Wright, sometime before his death in 1965.

== Career ==
=== World War I ===
Hawley was commissioned as a first lieutenant in the Medical Reserve Corps on 21 August 1916, and was a student at the Army Medical School in Washington, D.C., from October 1916 until February 1917. While at the school, he was commissioned a First Lieutenant in the Medical Corps of the Regular Army. After graduating the school, he was assigned duty as a recruiting officer at Fort Thomas, Kentucky, where he served until March 1918. At that time he was assigned as the Adjutant of the 309th Sanitary Train, a part of the 84th Division at Camp Zachary Taylor, Kentucky. In June 1918 he was transferred to the 334th Infantry Regiment of the 84th Division, a position he would continue to hold until the end of the war in 1918. While serving as regimental surgeon, he would be promoted to both Captain and Major in the Regular Army.

The 84th Division saw no combat during the war, and was "skeletonized," or stripped of 10,000 of its infantrymen, in October 1918 to provide replacements for other organizations. Hawley, however, first came to the attention of his superiors while serving as the 334th Infantry Regiment surgeon. Ordered to Razac, Dordogne, France, he took over a poorly functioning camp hospital to which half of the 84th Division's soldiers were being sent when they fell ill. He reorganized the camp, and his commanding officer, upon arrival at the camp, credited Hawley with "saving many soldiers’ lives" through his prompt actions in reorganizing the camp hospital.

In November 1918, Hawley was transferred from the 84th Division to the Intermediate Base Section, American Expeditionary Forces in Nevers, France, where he served as assistant surgeon. The Intermediate Base Section was the largest of the activities in the AEF's Service of Supply, covering all areas in France from the rear of the Zone of Armies to the coast, less those areas covered by numbered base sections. It had a strength of over 125,000 soldiers at peak, and 10 million square feet of covered warehouse space. The medical activities were extensive as well, with 29 base hospitals, 19 camp hospitals, 2 evacuation hospitals, 2 medical depots, 3 convalescent camps, 2 red cross convalescent camps, 3 veterinary hospitals, and a central laboratory—with more than 60,000 operational beds at peak. Hawley arrived at the point where the Services of Supply, and its base sections, were focused on turning the vast supply system around to return troops, supplies, and equipment back to the United States.

Hawley was struck by influenza during the pandemic of 1918, and spent much of the year hospitalized. He emerged with what his doctors said was a "bad heart," but which he diagnosed as severe anxiety. Working through his problems through physical reconditioning, Halsey avoided a disability retirement—and then proceeded to fracture a vertebra in his neck playing polo in 1921.

=== Between the Wars ===
Hawley returned from France in June 1919, and was assigned as the post surgeon, Fort Benjamin Harrison, Indiana. He would hold that post for three months, leaving it in September 1919. His official biography states that from June 1919 until July 1921 he was the regimental surgeon of the 14th Infantry Regiment and sanitary inspector of the 6th Division, but in all likelihood he served as regimental surgeon for the 14th Infantry at Camp Custer, Michigan, from June 1919 until the regiment was transferred to Fort Davis in the Panama Canal Zone, and then served as 6th Division sanitary inspector at Camp Grant, Illinois, from June 1919 until June 1921. In March 1921, Hawley received a letter of commendation from Major General Leonard Wood, who was then the commander of the VI Corps Area for an excellent report submitted while Hawley was assigned at Camp Grant, Illinois, supporting the argument that his assignments were sequential and not concurrent.

Following his assignment at Camp Grant, he spent August through December 1921 at the Army Medical School in Washington, D.C., following which he returned to Camp Custer, Michigan. There he served as the camp sanitary officer until September 1922. In September, he reported to Johns Hopkins University, where he spent the next nine months studying biostatistics and receiving a Doctorate in Public Health before again returning to Camp Custer, continuing to serve as the camp sanitary inspector until September 1923, when he moved to Chicago, Illinois to serve as the medical inspector for the VI Corps Area. In 1922 and again in 1923, he was commended by Brigadier General George Moseley for his efforts at insect control at Camp Custer. Moseley said, in part, that "In a region formerly noted for the number of its flies and mosquitos, he has made a great record in keeping this Camp free from both those pests."

In 1925 he was assigned as the medical inspector of the Philippine Department. While there, he had the additional duty of serving on the Advisory Committee on Malaria Control, which reported to the Governor of the Philippines, now-retired Major General Leonard Wood. Upon his return to the states in September 1927, Hawley reported to Fort Riley, Kansas, where he was assigned as the Surgeon for the United States Army Cavalry School. He was well thought of there, and his commanding officer stated of Hawley that he was "An officer of superior attainments, with splendid energy and keenly interested in his profess ion. His work as Attending Surgeon has been marked by the most scrupulous attention to the needs of his patients and is worthy of the highest commendation."

From August 1929 until July 1931, Hawley was assigned to the Nicaragua Canal Survey. The United States Interocean Canal Board had approved a two year long project to survey routes for a canal through Nicaragua to join the Atlantic and Pacific Oceans—to be larger than the Panama Canal. A group of 320 engineers and support personnel organized into a provisional engineer battalion—Hawley among them—surveyed multiple routes through the country. In the end the survey's final report found no route truly suitable for a canal at that time. After having fought against malarial bearing mosquitos and a virtual endemic of syphilis in the local population, Hawley was put to work during the March 1931 Nicaragua earthquake, where he and his medical detachment set up a treatment area and provided care for all who presented themselves, performing 10 major and 20 minor surgical procedures. Hawley himself treated the injured from the earthquake for 48 straight hours. For his service, he was one of four officers of the battalion awarded the Presidential Medal of Merit of Nicaragua. Among the other three officers receiving the award were the battalion commander, Lieutenant Colonel Daniel I. Sultan, the battalion executive officer, Major Charles P. Gross, and the A Company Commander, First Lieutenant Leslie R. Groves. All would later raise to positions of prominence in the Second World War. Members of the battalion were also awarded the Second Nicaraguan Campaign Medal for their service there. It was during his tour in Nicaragua that Hawley developed a number of relationships with other officers on the Survey which would serve him well during World War II, when many of them assumed key positions within the European Theater of Operations or the War Department during the war.

When Hawley returned stateside in July 1931, he was assigned as the executive officer of the Army Medical Center. At that time, the Army Medical Center included as subordinate units the Walter Reed General Hospital, the Army Medical School, and several smaller organizations. As the executive officer, he also had teaching responsibilities at the Army Medical School, where he served as an instructor in biostatistics and epidemiology. In August 1934 he left the Army Medical center for Fort Leavenworth, Kansas, where he attended the two-year course of the Command and General Staff School, graduating in June, 1936.

Upon his graduation from the Command and Staff School, Hawley was assigned to Carlisle Barracks, Pennsylvania, where he held two positions simultaneously—Commanding Officer of the 1st Medical Regiment, which served as the demonstration unit for the Medical Field Service School as well as the division-level medical support unit for the 1st Division. In addition, he served as director of the Department of Administration, one of the teaching departments at the Medical Field Service School. This dual assignment was not unusual at that time, which saw the 1st Medical Regiment frequently providing officers and non-commissioned officers to the school to serve as instructors. Although his regiment was at essentially cadre strength, Hawley and his men participated in some particularly notable events during his tenure in command. In 1937 Hawley deployed his hospital company and one of his ambulance companies to Kentucky and Indiana to provide support to flood relief operations in the Ohio River Valley in 1937. Also in 1937, as part of the Federal planning for ceremonies commemorating the 75th Anniversary of the Battle of Gettysburg—billed as "The Last Reunion of the Blue and Grey," the 1st Medical Regiment was tasked to provide the medical support for the reunion, and Hawley was appointed as Surgeon for the event, personally responsible for the medical support planning. It was also at this assignment that Hawley was promoted to Lieutenant Colonel in the Regular Army, having spent nearly 19 years as a major.

In September 1938, Hawley left command, and the Medical Field Service School, to attend the Army War College at Washington Barracks, Washington, D.C., graduating with a "superior" score as a member of the Class of 1939, among whose other members were Leslie Groves (who, like Hawley, had served on the Nicaragua Canal Survey) and Hoyt Vandenberg. Hawley was likely the only Medical Corps officer in his class, as in the 1939–1940 school year two Medical Corps officers attended the Army War College, and that year was noted as a year of significantly increased enrollment of Medical Corps officers in non-medical schools.

After graduation, Hawley returned to the Medical Field Service School, reporting to Carlisle Barracks in August 1939. There he served as the Director of Army Extension Courses and as an instructor until January 1941. At the time of his arrival, the Medical Field Service School was involved in a four-year program of revising all of their corresponding studies material, which was often the only formal training available to officers of the National Guard and Army Reserve. Indeed, between June 1939 and June 1940, some 11,000 Reserve and National Guard Medical Department officers enrolled in various correspondence programs offered by the school. A special course designed for Regular Army lieutenant colonels about to be promoted to colonel was ended in 1939, as was all enrollment of Regular Army officers in the corresponding studies program. The program for Reserve and National Guard officers was discontinued after the general mobilization of September 1940. His program discontinued, Hawley was ordered to Fort Lee, Virginia, to serve as commanding officer of the Medical Department Replacement Training Center being established there.

Hawley, along with Lieutenant Colonel Frank Matlack (like Hawley, a former commander of the 1st Medical Regiment) reported to Fort Lee on January 3, 1941, and activated the center on January 16, 1941. Designed to house and train seven battalions of medical trainees—each with a planned strength of 1,000 soldiers—the center received its first students in mid-March. Hawley spent the time between activation and the first student arrivals to organize the center and procure supplies and equipment. Several months after Hawley's departure from command, it was decided that having a Quartermaster Replacement Center and a Medical Replacement Center on the same installation was too great a strain on the available facilities, and the Medical Replacement Training Center was moved to Fort Pickett, Virginia—with the students conducting a forced march from Lee to Pickett as part of the move.

Two months after the first trainees reported, in May 1941, Hawley returned to Carlisle Barracks to serve as Assistant Commandant of the Medical Field Service School, a position he would hold until September, when he was ordered to England to serve on the Special Army Observers Group, commanded by Major General James E. Chaney. While assistant commandant, he was responsible for the development of all Army Medical Department Field Manuals.

=== The war in Europe ===
For Hawley, the war in Europe began with a phone call in mid-September 1941 asking him to report to the office of the Army Surgeon General's office the next morning packed and ready to go to a "classified location." That location was London, England, and the mission was to serve as the surgeon of the Special Observer Group, a group of American officers tasked with collecting lessons learned from the British—and to survey locations for American bases in the event the United States were to enter the war.

Within three months of his arrival, Hawley found himself part of an army at war. As he told the story in a 1962 oral history interview for the Army Medical Department Historical Unit,

the morning after Pearl Harbor - I hadn’t had my radio on that night... I was going down to Southern Command and I had to catch a train out of Waterloo Station about six o'clock in the morning. And so I got up and at five o'clock that Monday morning - it was in London - I walked over to Baker Street tube station to take a train down to Waterloo Station and, Jesus, headlines this high on the newsstand. I picked it up there - Pearl Harbor has been attacked. I went right back to my apartment - it was about a block away from the Baker Street tube station - and got into a uniform... And I walked into that conference room in uniform and they got up and yelled and cheered.

In early 1942, the United States Army Forces in the British Isles was activated, and Hawley—who had been identified to return to the states, since the Special Observers Group mission was completed—was identified to instead serve as the command surgeon for the organization. He held that position through the preparations for Operation TORCH, which saw most of the US Army medical units in Great Britain committed in support of that operation. Again identified for possible redeployment, Hawley was then offered the job as chief surgeon of the Services of Supply, British Isles, and then later as chief surgeon to the United States Army European Theater of Operations. Hawley believed he had been offered those positions because key staff members in those organizations had served with him on the Nicaragua Canal Survey ten years earlier.

=== The Veterans Administration ===
After the war, Omar Bradley was appointed as the administrator of the Veterans Administration by President Harry S. Truman. Bradley, in turn, asked Hawley to serve as VA Medical Director, and Hawley accepted—even though Bradley described the job as "the toughest job in the Veterans' Administration." Although Hawley's stay at the VA was brief—less than two years, as he departed in December 1947, when the appointment of Bradley as Army Chief of Staff was announced—he is credited with two major accomplishments during his tenure. First, Hawley fought to locate VA hospitals alongside medical schools throughout the country, providing access to specialty care—and interns, clerks, and residents—who were not available in many of the areas that Congress was trying to direct the construction of new VA facilities in, using VA hospitals as a form of patronage for their home districts.

His second major achievement was the adoption of what was then known as the Michigan Plan, a VA test program—using Michigan as a test-bed—aimed at improving access to care for veterans. The plan allowed, when care was not available to veterans through the VA, to be treated by their local physician, with the VA providing payment to the physician for services rendered. Given the large number of patients the VA had to provide care for after the war ended, and a shortage of VA facilities, the plan provided a way to empty the VA of those whose care did not require extensive, specialized care in a VA facility.

Hawley also worked with the army to secure the use of excess army hospitals for the VA, and for the temporary use of Army Medical Service personnel in those hospitals while recruiting VA staff for them. In many cases, these were hospitals which had provided specialty care, such as spinal cord injury care, and the transfer allowed patients to move from the care of the Army to the VA without leaving the facilities they were in. The hospitals were transferred, in most cases, with all of their equipment, which also saved the work of disposing it, and the cost to the VA of buying new equipment. At the same time, the Army agreed to retain treatment of tuberculosis patients in Army facilities, as the VA did not yet have the capability to provide effective treatment.

The workload in the VA system was daunting—in early 1946, Hawley reported that the VA inpatient load was 95,000 veterans, 51% of which were neuropsychiatric cases. Hawley turned to the military again to recruit physicians interested in pursuing work in psychology or neurology, publishing an open letter of recruitment in The Bulletin of the U.S. Army Medical Department. He turned to the Journal of the American Medical Association to recruit physicians as well. He also turned to another group for advice and expertise—the consultants who had worked for him in the ETO, or whom he knew from his many years in the service. He used them as an independent group of examiners who provided him with advice he felt he could trust, and provided without a perspective shaped by years in the VA healthcare system. The consultants had formed their own organization, the Society of Medical Consultants to the Armed Forces, and in the immediate postwar years some 90% of the society's members served as consultants to the VA.

Hawley made quite an impression on the press during his tenure at the VA, as reported by Colliers magazine in 1946:

The man primarily responsible ... is the Acting Chief Medical Director of the V .A., Major General Paul R. Hawley. Pudgy, bespectacled, 56-year-old Hawley is to Omar Bradley what Harold Ickes was to Franklin Delano Roosevelt. He is the picturesque, free-swinging curmudgeon of the Veterans Administration. He even looks like Ickes. And he has set what is probably a new Washington record with the number of people he has thrown out of his office.

He has evicted politicians who wanted medical patronage for their districts, people who demanded that the graduates of the two first-class Negro medical colleges be excluded from practicing in veterans' hospitals, and representatives of John Stelle, National Commander of the American Legion, who wanted to admit en masse to V.A. practice graduates from a little Class-C Illinois medical school.

By the time Hawley left the VA in late 1947, his beneficiary population had reached 4,000,000; he had a $750,000,000 construction budget, and nearly half of the VA's 124 hospitals were affiliated with medical schools. He had doubled the number of nurses employed by the VA, increased the number of physicians sixfold, and increased the number of social workers seven-fold.

=== The Hawley Board ===
In 1947, President Harry S. Truman appointed former President Herbert Hoover to lead the Commission on Organization of the Executive Branch of the Government. This commission, which quickly became known as the Hoover Commission, was composed of multiple committees, and Hawley served on the committee on Federal Healthcare. Within the committee, Hawley was appointed to serve as the chair of the Medical care and Hospitalization in the Armed Forces subcommittee, which became known as the Hawley Board.

The Hawley Board, which was chartered by Secretary of Defense James Forrestal, was charged to look at the full spectrum of healthcare within the services, and in addition to Hawley, the Army Surgeon General, the Navy Surgeon General, and the Air Surgeon were appointed as members. Rear Admiral Joel T. Boone was appointed as the recorder. The committee had virtual free rein throughout the medical departments of the services, and could call witnesses as they saw fit. A portion of the report, detailing 71 recommendations focused primarily on the use of military hospitals, was released by the Secretary of Defense on January 12, 1949.

In the end, only one of the Hawley Board's recommendations was approved by the Hoover Commission—the creation of the National Library of Medicine through the transfer of the Army Medical Library to the Public Health Service in the Department of Health, Education, and Welfare in 1956. Despite the lack of adoption of its recommendations at the time, the Hawley Board is still cited in discussions on military health system governance within the Department of Defense, particularly by the Defense Health Agency.

=== Hawley's later years ===
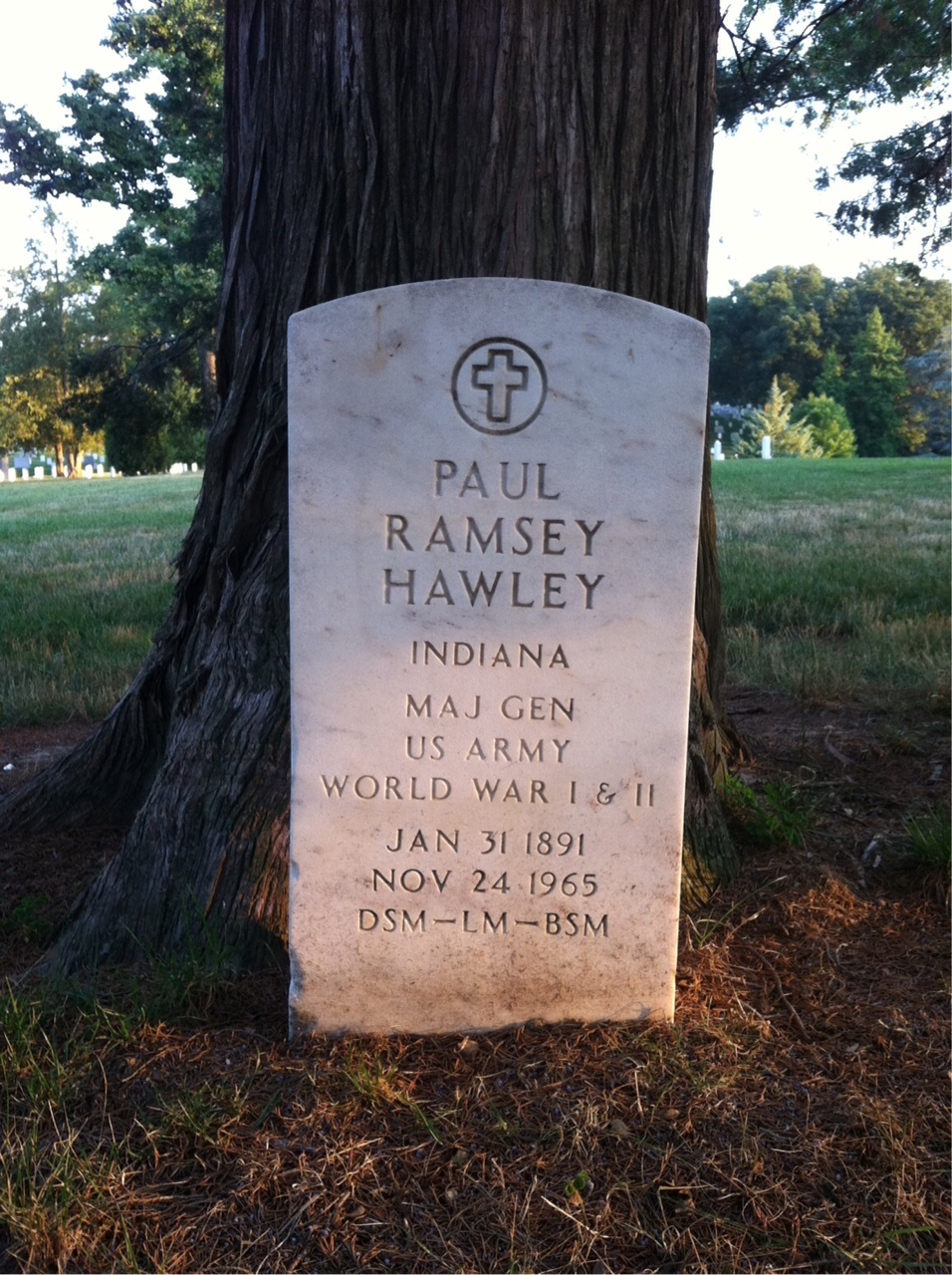
Gravesite of Major General Paul Ramsey Hawley in Arlington National Cemetery

In 1952, Hawley was made an honorary fellow of the American College of Surgeons. Already a fellow, the distinction of honorary fellow meant that he would no longer be required to pay fellowship dues to the college.

In 1957, Hawley established a trust with the American College of Surgeons, bequeathing all of his assets to the college in exchange for receiving a lifetime pension from the college. After Hawley's death, the trust became the heart of a scholarship program which continues to this day.

Hawley served as chairman of The Surgeon General's Advisory Editorial Boards on the History of Training in World War II (a "Maroon Book") from October 1956 until his death and on the History of Medical Service in the European Theater of Operations (a "Green Book") from May 1962 until his death. The history of training was published in 1974, but it would not be until 1995 that the official history of the medical service in the European Theater of Operations was finally published.

Hawley died at the Walter Reed Army Medical Center on November 24, 1965, following a several years long fight with cancer. His burial with military honors took place at Arlington National Cemetery on November 29, 1965.

== Memorialization ==
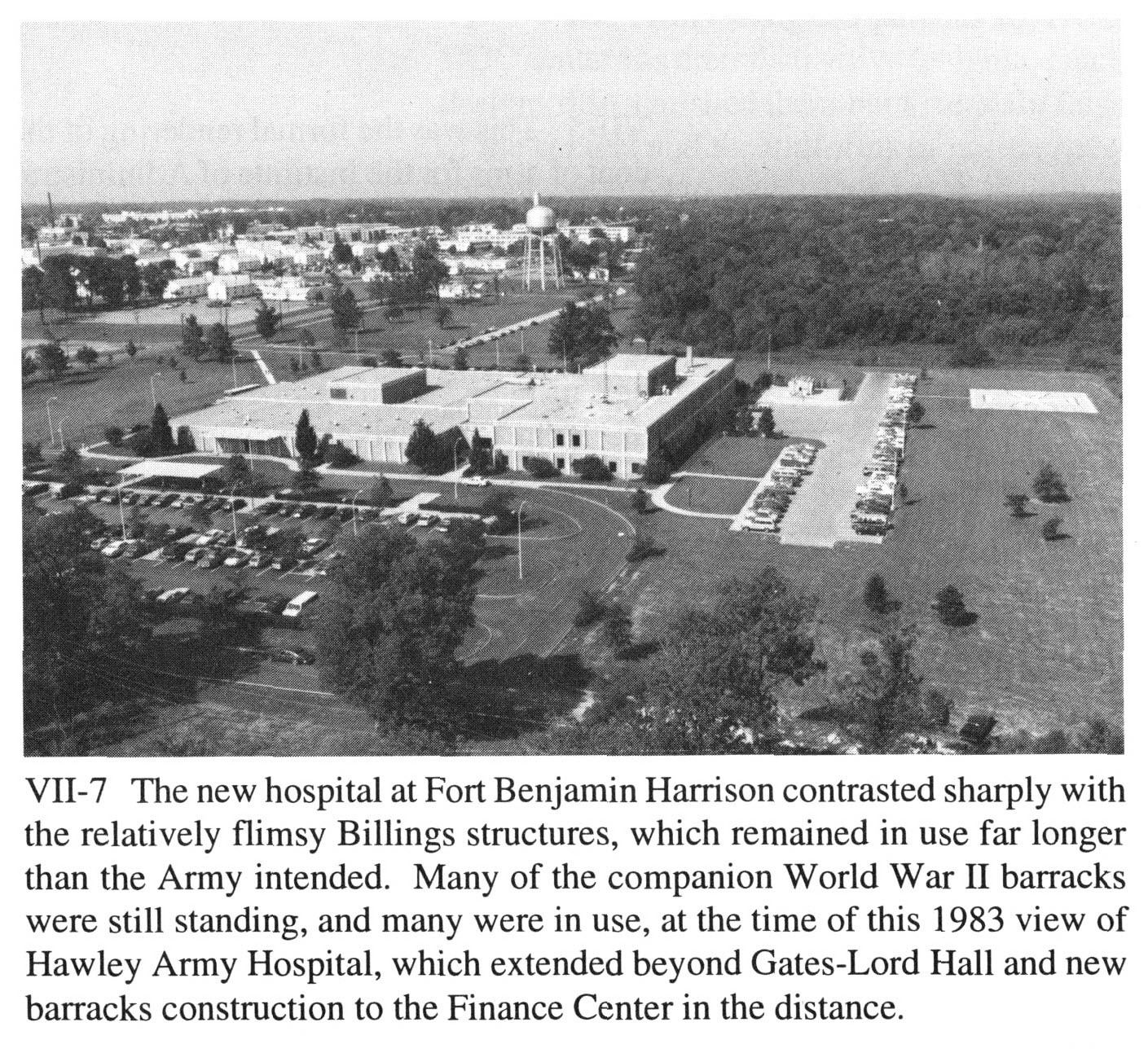
Hawley Army Community Hospital, Fort Benjamin Harrison, Indiana in 1983

The Society of Medical Consultants to the Armed Forces, originally the Society of Medical Consultants of World War II, was formed shortly after the end of the war. As the organization grew, those consultants who had served under Hawley in the ETO formed an intramural club within the organization, known as the Hawley Club. They met for a luncheon at each of the Society's meetings. After Hawley's death in 1965, the Hawley Club disbanded, as the members did not want it to become a "last man standing" club.

The US Army Medical Department Activity at Fort Benjamin Harrison, Indiana, was named the Hawley Army Community Hospital when it opened on May 12, 1973. On October 1, 1977, the hospital was reorganized as the Hawley U.S. Army Health Clinic, a subordinate clinic of the Fort Knox MEDDAC, during force reductions in the post-Vietnam era. On October 1, 1982, Hawley Army Health Clinic was again reorganized and redesignated as Hawley U.S. Army Community Hospital during the Reagan-era military build-up. On October 1, 1993, the hospital was once more reorganized and redesignated as the Hawley U.S. Army Health Clinic as part of Fort Benjamin Harrison's Base Realignment and Closure (BRAC), and on September 30, 1995, the Hawley U.S. Army Health Clinic closed. The hospital was demolished in 2006 to make room for a new Post Exchange/Commissary complex, replacing facilities that had remained open after the BRAC closure of the fort.

The Hawley Army Community Hospital was authorized its own distinctive unit insignia.

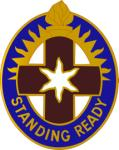
Distinctive unit insignia (DUI) of the Hawley Army Community Hospital

=== Description/Blazon ===
A gold color metal and enamel insignia 1 3/16 inches (3.0 cm) in height consisting of an equilateral maroon cross bearing a white star of six wavy points, issuing from the upper arm of the cross a gold flaming torch; all within and in front of an oval band, the upper half divided blue and gold by a radiant arced partition line and the lower half blue bearing the inscription "STANDING READY" in gold letters.

=== Symbolism ===
The cross, emblem of service and care, stands for medical activity at Fort Benjamin Harrison. The torch issuing from the cross refers to medical enlightenment; the rays allude to the dispensation of knowledge. The star symbolizes excellence and guidance. In addition, the white star formed of six wavy points, called an "estoile" in heraldry, is taken from the coat of arms of Benjamin Harrison for whom the Fort is named. The colors blue and gold and the torch are taken from the State flag of Indiana where the hospital is located. Maroon and white are the colors used for organizations of the Army Medical Department.

=== Background ===
The distinctive unit insignia was originally approved for the US Army Hospital, Fort Benjamin Harrison on 9 July 1970. It was redesignated for the US Army Medical Department Activity, Fort Benjamin Harrison on 22 August 1973. The insignia was redesignated for the Hawley US Army Community Hospital on 31 January 1983.

== Affiliations ==
Fellow, American College of Physicians
Fellow, American College of Surgeons
Honorary Fellow, American College of Surgeons, 1952
Director, American College of Surgeons, 1950-1961
Fellow, Southern Surgical Association
Fellow, Royal College of Physicians (United Kingdom)
Fellow, Royal College of Surgeons (United Kingdom) (honorary)
Fellow, Royal Society of Medicine (United Kingdom)
Fellow, American College of Hospital Administrators (honorary)
Fellow, l'Academie de Chirugie (France) (honorary)
Fellow, American Psychiatric Association (honorary)
Fellow, Colorado Medical Association
Fellow, American Hospital Association
Fellow, Southeastern Surgical Congress
Columbia Medical Association
American Medical Association
Association of Military Surgeons of the United States
Delta Omega
Phi Delta Theta (national president 1956–58)
Phi Rho Sigma (Medical Student Honor Society)

== Awards and decorations ==

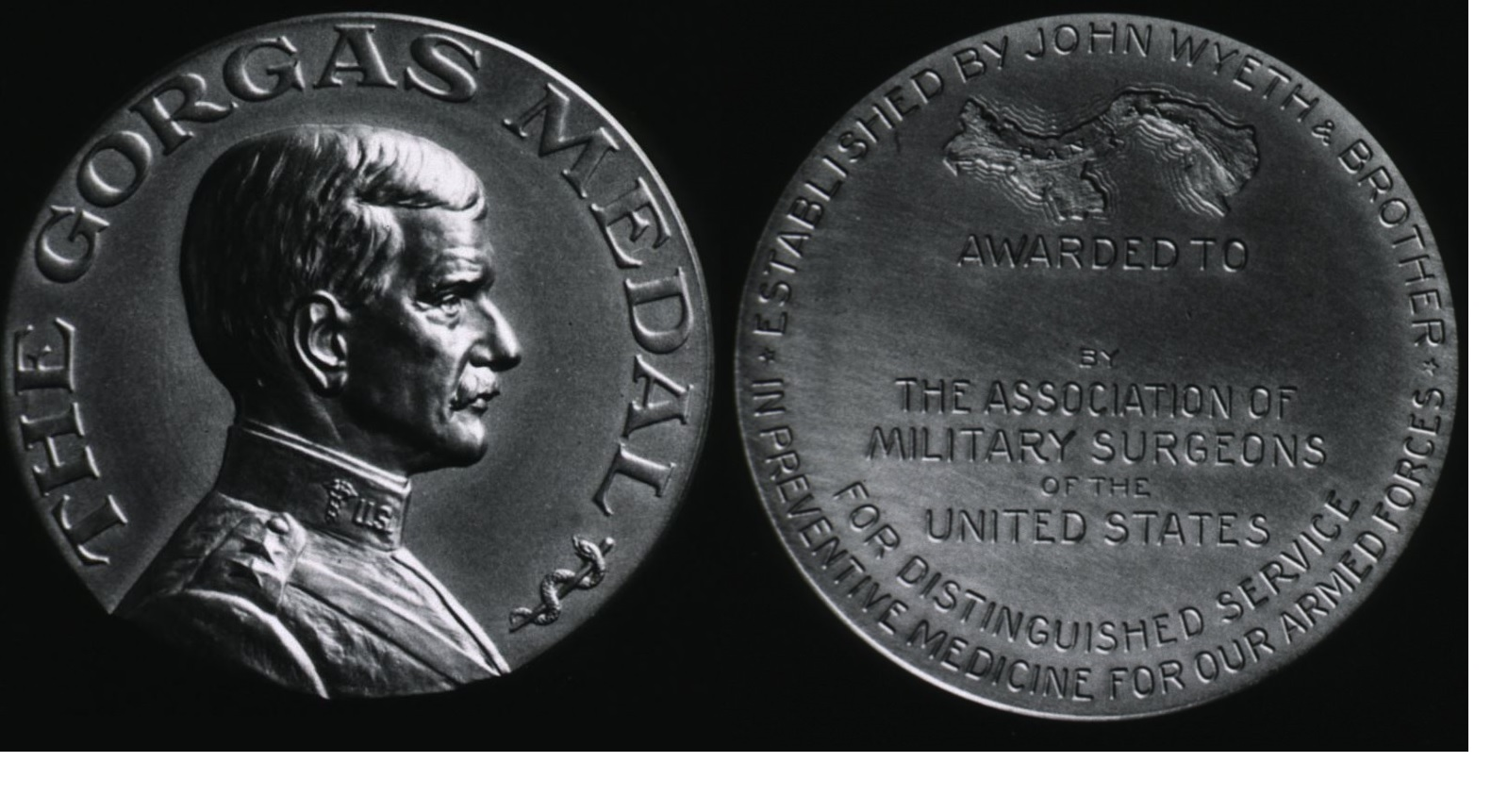

1st Row	Army Distinguished Service Medal			
2nd Row	Legion of Merit	Bronze Star	World War I Victory Medal	Second Nicaraguan Campaign Medal
3rd Row	American Defense Service Medal with "Foreign Service" Clasp	European-African-Middle Eastern Campaign Medal with two bronze service stars	World War II Victory Medal	Presidential Medal of Merit ( Nicaragua)
4th Row	Companion, Order of the Bath (United Kingdom)	Order of St. John of Jerusalem (United Kingdom)	Officer, Legion of Honour (France)	Commander, Order of Public Health (France)
5th Row	Croix de guerre with bronze palm (France)	Commander, Order of the Crown (Belgium)	Commander, Order of St. Olav (Norway)	Officer, Order of Carlos Finlay (Cuba)
6th Row	Gorgas Medal (AMSUS)	Special Award, National Rehabilitation Council	Lasker Award♦ (Lasker Foundation)	Irving S. Cutter Medal (Phi Rho Sigma)

♦The Lasker Award was a group award to the Veterans Administration Department of Medicine and Surgery in 1948.

== Promotions ==
First Lieutenant, Medical Reserve Corps: August 21, 1916
First Lieutenant, Medical Corps (United States Army) (MC) Regular Army: January 26, 1917
Captain, MC, Regular Army: March 28, 1918
Major, MC, Regular Army: 28 March 1918
Lieutenant Colonel, MC, Regular Army: January 26, 1937
Colonel, MC, Army of the United States: June 26, 1941
Brigadier General, Army of the United States: September 10, 1942
Colonel, MC, Regular Army: January 26, 1943
Major General, Army of the United States: February 27, 1944

== Honorary degrees ==
Doctor of Science, Wayne University, Detroit, Michigan
Doctor of Science, Union College
Doctor of Laws, University of Cincinnati, Cincinnati, Ohio
Doctor of Laws, Indiana University, Bloomington, Indiana
Doctor of Laws, Georgetown University, Washington, D.C.
Doctor of Laws, University of Birmingham, Edgbaston, Birmingham, United Kingdom
