= 274th Forward Surgical Team (Airborne) =

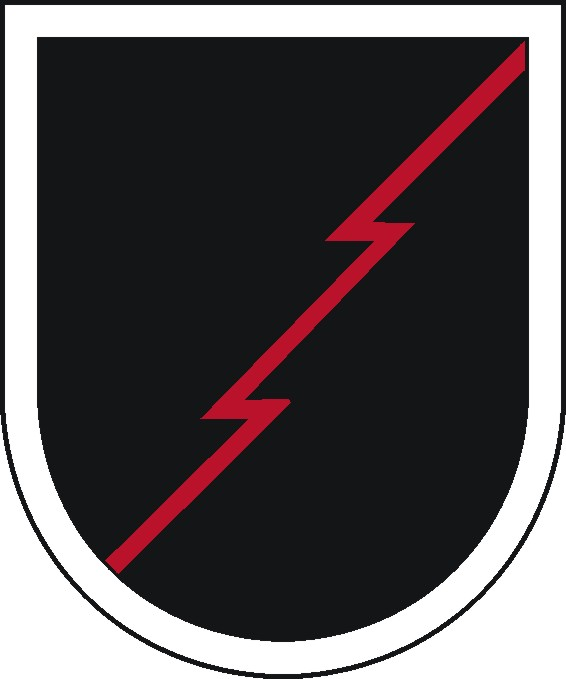
- 274th Forward Resuscitative and Surgical Detachment (Airborne) Beret Flash
- Active: 1944–46, 1952–52, 1953–61, 1963–70, 1976–present
- Country: United States
- Branch: United States Army
- Type: Forward surgical team
- Size: 20 personnel authorized
- Part of: 16th Hospital Center, 44th Medical Brigade
- Garrison/HQ: Fort Bragg, NC
- Engagements: World War II Panama; Gulf War; Iraq War Afghanistan War

Commanders
- Commander: MAJ Matthew Fanning
- Notable commanders: Colonel Brian D. Allgood (1997-1999)

Insignia
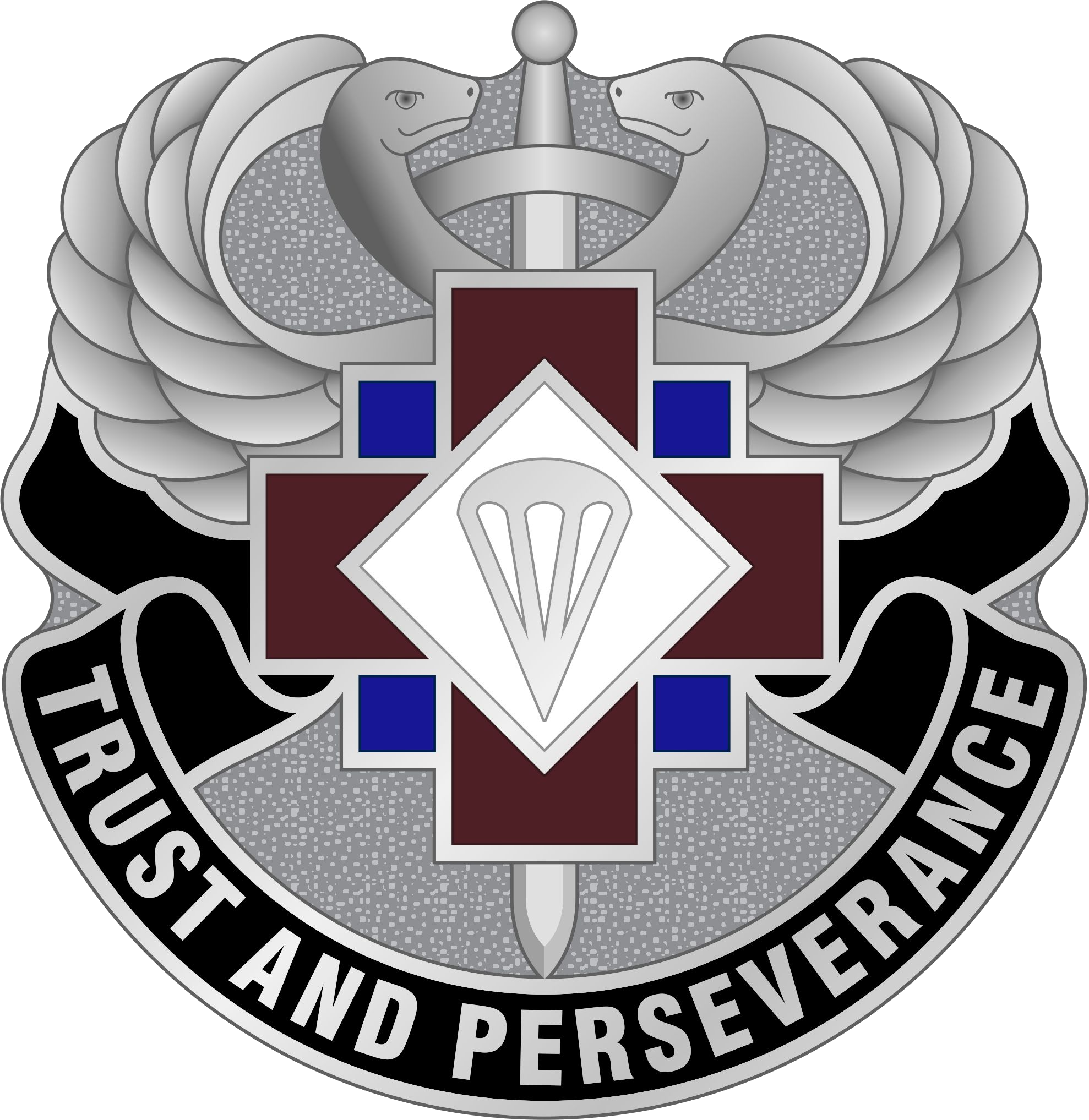
- Distinctive unit insignia of the 16th Hospital Center, parent unit of the 274th Forward Resuscitative and Surgical Detachment (Airborne)

The 274th Forward Surgical Team (Airborne)—part of the 274th Forward Resuscitative and Surgical Detachment (Airborne)—is an airborne forward surgical team of the United States Army providing Level II care far forward on the battlefield. It was first constituted in 1944 and served in Europe during World War II. More recently it has been involved in relief operations following natural disasters and has undertaken several recent deployments to Iraq and Afghanistan. The 274th Forward Surgical Team was part of both the initial entry forces of Operation Enduring Freedom in 2001 and Operation Iraqi Freedom in 2003. Currently the unit falls under the command of the 16th Hospital Center and is based at Fort Bragg, North Carolina.

== History ==
The 274th Medical Section was constituted 19 February 1944 and activated 25 February 1944 at Camp Grant, Illinois. The unit was re-designated as the 274th Medical Detachment on 10 April 1945 during World War II. The 274th Medical Detachment was inactivated on 31 January 1946 in France. The 274th was allotted to the Regular Army on 29 December 1951, activated at Fort Sill, Oklahoma, on 18 January 1952 and inactivated on 18 August 1952. The unit was again activated on 23 November 1953 at Brooke Army Medical Center, Texas, and inactivated on 21 August 1961 in Germany. The unit then moved to Fort Knox, Kentucky, and activated on 8 February 1963 and deactivated at Fort Bragg, North Carolina, on 20 April 1970. After six years, the 274th was activated on 21 June 1976 at Fort Bragg and re-designated in March 1997 as the 274th Medical Detachment, Forward Surgical (Airborne).

In October 2001, the 274th FST (ABN) deployed to Bagram, Afghanistan in support of Operation Enduring Freedom following the September 11th attacks, where it remained until May 2002. During this period, the FST was responsible for functioning as a small combat support hospital, performing in-flight resuscitations and surgeries to soldiers wounded in combat, and leading the multinational coalition that provided medical support for Operation Anaconda.

Most recently, the 274th FST (ABN) deployed to Jalalabad, Afghanistan, in support of Operation Enduring Freedom (XII-XIII) on 29 Jun 2012. During this time the 274th provided trauma resuscitation and emergency surgical support operations for the 4th Infantry Division and 101st Airborne Division in Eastern Afghanistan. The 274th performed over 150 trauma resuscitations and treated over 40 surgical cases during the deployment. The unit also provided medical support for trauma patients during four Mass Casualty (MASCAL) events. The pinnacle of these was on 2 December 2012 when FOB Fenty came under a coordinated attack by Vehicle Borne Improvised Explosive Devices and suicide bombers, as well as small and heavy weapons fire as insurgents attempted to breach the perimeter of the base. There were multiple casualties received by the FST while still under attack by insurgents. For its actions during this event, the 274th Forward Surgical Team (Airborne) was nominated for its second Meritorious Unit Commendation.

== Role and structure ==
The 274th Forward Surgical Team (Airborne) is tasked with providing Level II combat health support to coalition forces, contractors, local nationals, and enemy combatants when deployed. At the same time, it maintains the ability to split for smaller force level operations to provide front-line medical and surgical support. When the surgical team is not deployed, or has not been assigned a patient care role, it is tasked with supporting the XVIII Airborne Corps Global Response Force, and undertaking a range of tasks as part of the Fort Bragg garrison.

The forward surgical team is organized into four functional areas:

- Headquarters – Communications and administrative functions.
- ATLS (Advanced Trauma Life Support) – Triages and prepares multiple casualties for surgery or transport and has a total of four beds.
- OR (Operating room) – Sets up and begins surgery within one hour, can be at full functioning capacity within two hours of establishing an area of operations. The OR has two separate OR tables that can be used at the same time allowing treatment for a greater number of casualties in a given time. The focus is for damage control surgery.
- Recovery / ICU (intensive care unit) – four beds for post-surgical care; two beds reserved for patients awaiting evacuation.

The 274th Forward Surgical Team (Airborne) consists of the following personnel:

- 1 commander
- 1 executive officer
- 1 orthopaedic surgeon
- 3 general surgeons
- 2 certified registered nurse anesthetists
- 1 emergency room registered nurse
- 1 critical care registered nurse
- 1 operating room registered nurse
- 3 surgical techs
- 3 licensed practical nurses
- 4 medics

After a soldier is wounded on the battlefield, the first care he or she receives is the care they give themselves or that which they receive from a fellow soldier. This usually consists of splints, bandages, and other efforts to control bleeding. Here, the combat medic of the unit on the ground focus on the injured soldier's airway, breathing, and circulation. The medic then calls for a medical evacuation (MEDEVAC) to a higher level of care. Often, UH-60 Blackhawk helicopters will be dispatched to pick up the wounded soldiers on the battlefield and bring them back for Level II care. Level II is where the most forward surgical capacity is located. Here, the surgeons evaluate all the wounded and prioritize for surgery. Patients that require operative intervention are taken to the operating room for damage control surgery, which is focused on abbreviated surgical times, control of hemorrhage with ligation or shunting, and control of contamination without definitive repairs. Examples of this would include patients who sustained a gunshot or blast injury through the abdomen that involved perforation of the bowel. The injured bowel segment would be resected, but not reconnected.

For orthopaedic injuries, preliminary fixation is achieved with external fixation through minimally invasive incisions rather than definitive internal fixation (plate-and-screw, or intramedullary fixation). The goal of these surgical interventions is to resuscitate and stabilize, not repair. Those patients that require it, are then evacuated to Level III care at a Combat Support Hospital where there are more advanced interventions available such as CT scanners, MRIs, longer-stay intensive care units, etc. Wounds are re-examined and washed out again, and some definitive repair is done here. Patients with injuries that prevent them from returning to the battlefield will then be evacuated to Level IV care in Landstuhl Regional Medical Center (LRMC) in Germany. This is where some definitive fracture repair and abdominal surgery is performed. From LRMC, patients are then evacuated to the Continental United States (CONUS) for reunion with family and rehabilitation from their injuries. It is not uncommon for a wounded soldier to be in Germany less than 24 hours after sustaining their injury on the battlefield in Afghanistan.

== Campaign participation ==
- World War II: Europe 1944–1945

- Rhineland
- Ardennes-Alsace
- Central Europe

- Dominican Republic Crisis 1965–1966
- Operation Just Cause in Panama, 1989–1990
- The Liberation and Defense of Kuwait 1990
- The Defense of Saudi Arabia, 1990–1991
- Operation Uphold Democracy in Haiti 1994–1995
- Operation Iraqi Freedom

- OIF I 2003, An Nasiriyah, Iraq
- OIF IV 2005–2006, Tal Afar and Mosul, Iraq
- OIF IX-X 2009 Basra, Iraq

- Operation Enduring Freedom

- OEF I 2001–2002, Bagram, Afghanistan, Operation Anaconda
- OEF IX 2009–2010, Split to Shindand and Bala Murghab, Afghanistan
- OEF XII 2012–2013, FOB Fenty, Jalalabad, Afghanistan

- Operation Inherent Resolve, 2016-2017, 2019

== Decorations ==
Presidential Unit Citation for:

- Operation Iraqi Freedom 2003

Meritorious Unit Commendation for:

- Gulf War 1990 - 1991
- Operation Iraqi Freedom 2008–2009
- Operation Enduring Freedom 2012–2013(Nominated).

== In peer-reviewed medical literature ==
In order to share their experiences with the medical community, the surgeons of the 274th Forward Surgical Team have written several articles for publication in peer-reviewed medical literature. Their presence in the initial entry forces of both Afghanistan in 2001 and Iraq in 2003 gave them a new look at the ability of the forward surgical team concept to function in the new "low-intensity" combat expected in each theater. Drs. George Peoples, Tad Gerlinger, Robert Craig, and Brian Burlingame were assigned as the orthopaedic and general surgeons of the FST during the early phases of Operation Enduring Freedom from October 2001 to May 2002, and during Operation Anaconda in early March 2002. They wrote of their combined experiences during this time period including all the lessons learned from their initial setup in Uzbekistan and then the split operations they conducted in Bagram, Afghanistan. At that time, their experience with combat casualties and the surgical care of combat wounds was the largest since the Persian Gulf War.

The 274th Forward Surgical Team treated 90% of the US casualties in this period, consisting of 224 combat casualties, including 153 U.S. soldiers, 19 coalition soldiers, 32 Afghan militia forces soldiers, and 20 detainees. Blast fragments were the most common mechanism of injury (49%), and the extremity was the most common location of injury (58%), whereas gunshot wounds were the most common cause of death (57%). There were few significant head, chest, or abdominal wounds (13%). The FST treated 103 surgical cases (73 with combat wounds), including neurosurgical, thoracic, general, orthopedic, and vascular cases, with a total of 180 procedures. They concluded that the distribution, cause, and severity of wounds were similar to those in the Persian Gulf War, despite the obvious differences between these conflicts. The use of modern technologies, such as compact, portable, ultrasound and digital X-ray systems, expanded the capabilities of the FST. Even low-intensity conflicts can produce significant numbers of combat casualties, and the FST must be manned, trained, equipped, and supplied to treat a wide variety of combat wounds.

Drs. Craig and Peoples also wrote about their modification of a patient warming device for its use in heating intravenous fluids to help address the hypothermia routinely seen in combat casualties. By adapting the Bair Hugger patient warmer to a box they created for the purpose, they were able to raise the temperature of their irrigation and intravenous fluids to a physiologic level to help counteract the peripheral vasoconstriction and coagulopathy seen in hypothermic casualties. This technique is still discussed today in surgical training for preparations of patient care in an austere environment.

The 274th Forward Surgical Team was then, and continues to be, a source of refresher training to the United States Army Special Forces medics. The areas of greatest interest and concern were orthopedics, field transfusions, and field-expedient anesthesia. The surgeons wrote an article explaining their methods for teaching these topics to the Special Forces for the purpose of preparing future FSTs in theater for the task.

In an illustration of how multi-national surgical teams can jointly manage mass casualty situations, Dr. D. Vassalo of the British 34 Field Hospital Troop and the members of the 274th Forward Surgical Team wrote of their collaborative efforts in the treatment of 16 injured service members involved in a Chinook helicopter crash on 28 January 2002. This was the largest mass casualty incident to be dealt with in a combined fashion by the British and American medical services in Afghanistan during the initial months of Operation Enduring Freedom.

In an editorial published by the New England Journal of Medicine, Dr. Atul Gawande describes the current methodology of medical treatment in a deployed theater of operations, describing the roles of the 274th Forward Surgical Team and the 28th Combat Support Hospital. He explains the focus of the forward surgical teams being that of "damage control" in lieu of definitive fixation and repair. Orthopaedic surgeons forego X-rays and diagnose fractures by feel for treatment with external fixation. Perforated bowel injuries are stapled off, bleeding livers are packed with sponges, and dirty wounds are washed out. Surgical times are kept less than two hours to prevent the patients from becoming hypothermic and coagulopathic. Abdomens can be left open, laparotomy pads left in, bowel unanastomosed, the patient paralyzed, sedated, and ventilated. He also describes the hardships seen by the FST surgeons due to multiple deployments with only short periods of time at home.

Most recently, LTC Robert Lim and MAJ William Rice (surgeons with the 274th FST from June – October 2012) wrote of their experiences as bariatric surgeons specializing in weight loss surgery and how they adapted their skills to function in a trauma setting in Afghanistan. They describe how it is not unusual for a military bariatric surgeon to go from performing a single incision laparoscopic sleeve gastrectomy in a state-of-the-art laparoscopic suite one month to performing a neck exploration for a penetrating zone II gunshot wound in a poorly lit, nonventilated operating room in the mountains of Afghanistan the next month.
