= Medical Unit, Self-contained, Transportable =

US Army medical equipment system

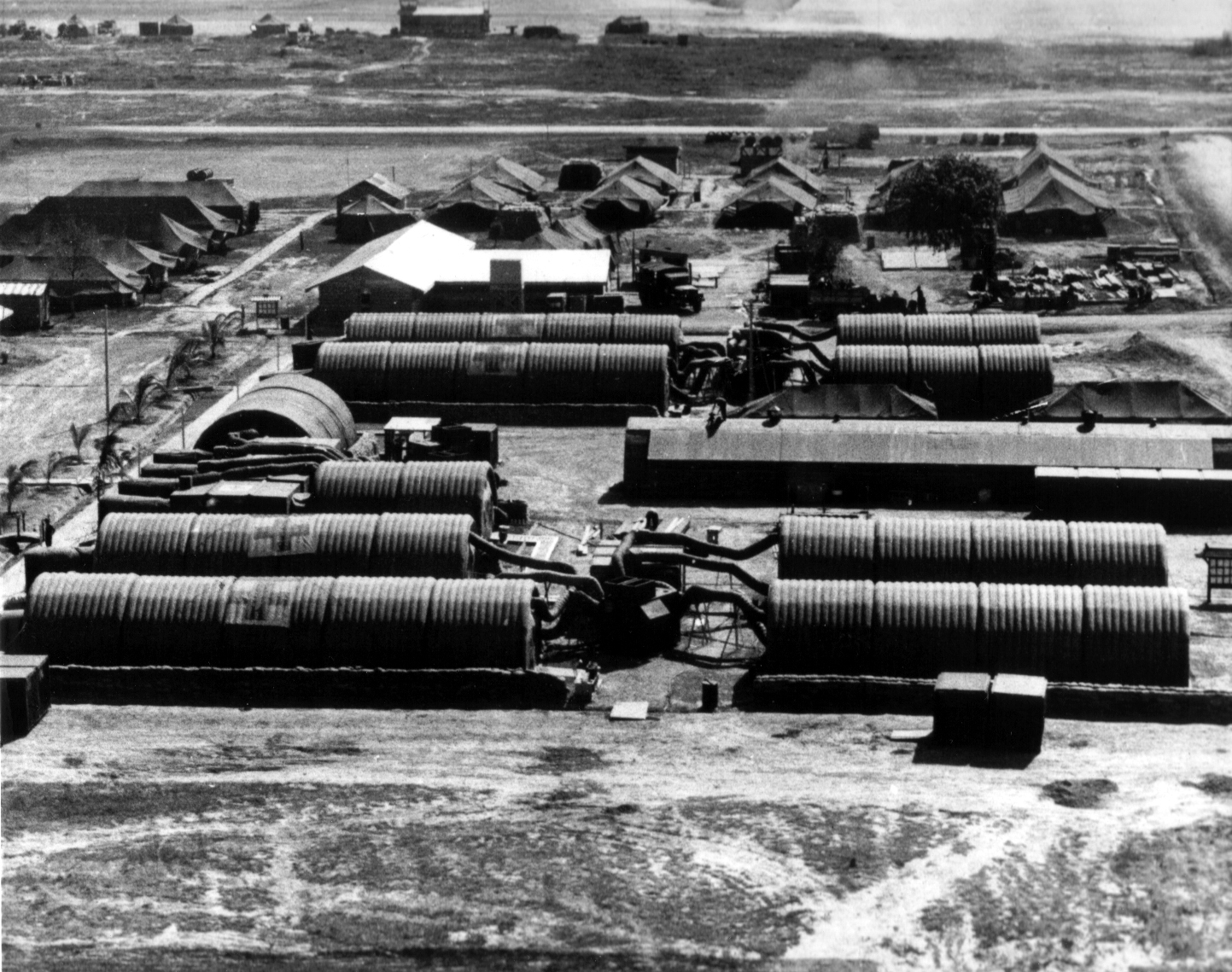
A US Army Hospital in Vietnam, equipped with MUST (Medical Unit, Self Contained, Transportable) equipment

Medical Unit, Self-contained, Transportable (MUST) was a type of medical equipment system developed for field hospitals in the United States Army in the late 1950s and early 1960s. The system used inflatable shelters for ward and patient care space, and expandable shelters for operating rooms and other sections. They were powered by auxiliary power units which used JP-4 as fuel, producing power and air conditioning for the hospital in addition to air to keep the shelters inflated. A 60-bed surgical hospital in Vietnam could use up to 3,000 gallons of JP-4 per day to keep the hospital inflated and operational.

== Procurement ==
The units were manufactured by Missouri Research Manufacturing Company, Inflated Products Company, Firestone Tire and Rubber Company, Brunswick Corporation, with spare parts supplied by Coats & Clark Company and Scoville Manufacturing Company (zippers,) Beckett Lace and Velcro (fasteners.)

== Operation ==
According to Major General Spurgeon Neel, a commander of the 44th Medical Brigade in South Vietnam:

MUST-equipped surgical hospitals were operated for several years in Vietnam with mixed success. These units consisted of three basic elements, each of which could be airlifted and dispatched by truck or helicopter. The expandable surgical element was a self-contained, rigid-panel shelter with accordion sides. The air-inflatable ward element was a double-walled fabric shelter providing a free-space area for ward facilities. The utility element or power package contained a multifuel gas turbine engine which supplied electric power for air-conditioning, refrigeration, air heating and circulation, water heating and pumping, air pressure for the inflatable elements, and compressed air or suction. In addition, other expandables were used for central materiel supply, laboratory, X-ray, pharmacy, dental, and kitchen facilities.

In 1969, the 44th Medical Brigade conducted a test of the mobility of their MUST hospitals, which had been essentially serving as static facilities. During the period 16–21 October 1969, the 2d Surgical Hospital conducted a test of the mobility of MUST equipment under combat conditions. The test involved the temporary relocation of one air inflatable shelter, one expandable, one utility pack and other MUST peculiar equipment from Lai Khe to Di An. Upon completion of the test, the following observations were made:

1. Removing MUST components from permanently revetmented areas over concrete pads by forklift is time-consuming and could possibly damage the components
2. After being placed in a static situation for a prolonged period of time, many small movable parts of expandables and ward boxes became rusted and ceased to function properly
3. It would be extremely difficult, if not impossible, to set up the MUST unit in total darkness and under blackout conditions unless all personnel were specially trained for that situation
4. With the rapid turnover of personnel, desired proficiency in packing, marking and erecting the MUST unit cannot be maintained
5. It was felt that the recommended time (1/2 hour) to erect one inflatable and one expandable is impractical because of the fixed status of the unit and inability of personnel to become proficient in this exercise. A period of one hour is more reasonable.
6. The lesson learned from this exercise was that a surgical hospital (MUST) is capable of relocating a portion of its facilities to a new site and becoming operational while it continues to operate the base element.
