= United States Army Medical Department Center and School =

U.S. Army school for the education and training of medical personnel

Coordinates: 29°27′38″N 98°26′55″W

U.S. Army Medical Center of Excellence (MEDCoE)
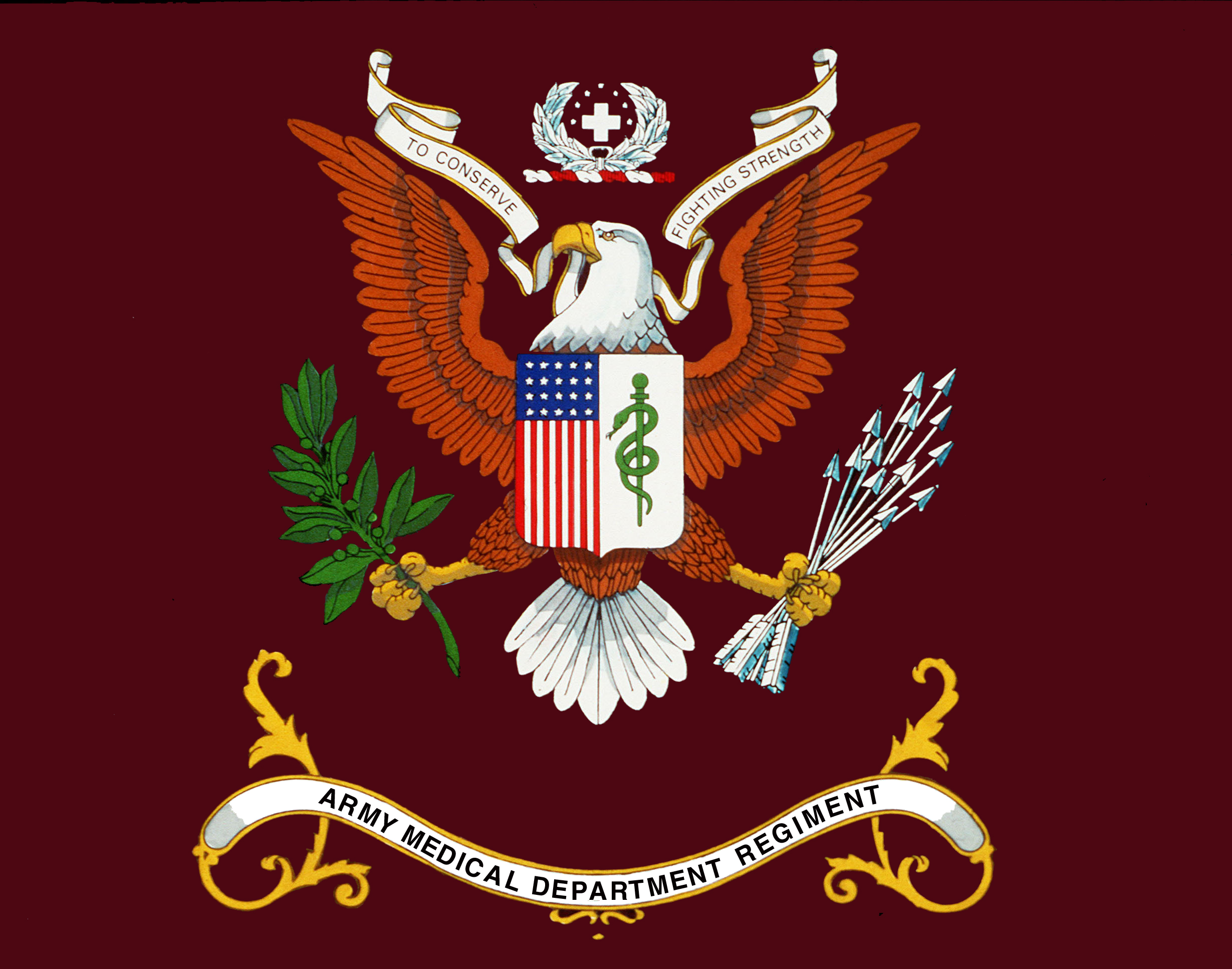
- U.S. Army Medical Department Regimental Flag
- Active: 1 September 1920-present
- Country: United States
- Allegiance: Army Medical Department (United States) (AMEDD)
- Branch: United States Army
- Type: Medical
- Role: Develops, trains, and educates health care personnel and leaders
- Part of: United States Army Combined Arms Command
- Garrison/HQ: Joint Base San Antonio, Fort Sam Houston, Texas
- Motto: To Conserve Fighting Strength
- Colors: Gold and Sanguine (maroon)

Commanders
- Commanding General: MG Anthony L. McQueen
- Deputy to the Commanding General: Mr. Joseph Holland (SES)
- Command Sergeant Major: CSM Jesus H. Gonzalez
- Command Chief Warrant Officer: CW5 Lee Nelson
- Chief of Staff: COL Aristotle Vaseliades

Insignia
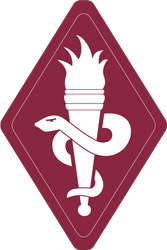
- Shoulder sleeve insignia

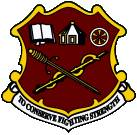
- Distinctive unit insignia

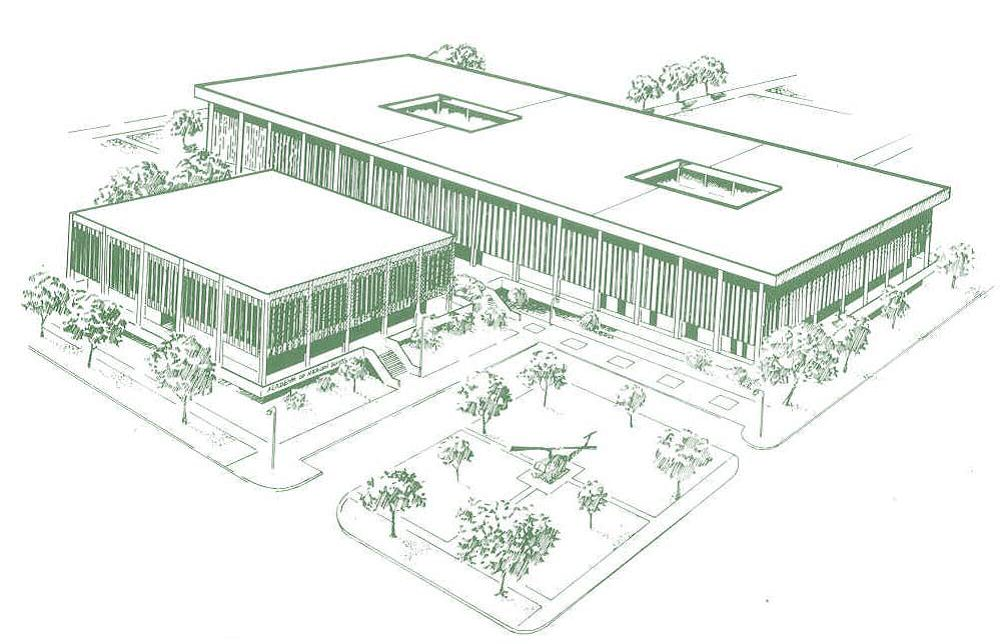
The headquarters and primary instructional facility of the AMEDDC&S, HRCoE, located on the Military Medical Education and Training Campus, Joint Base San Antonio (JBSA) Fort Sam Houston, Texas.

The U.S. Army Medical Center of Excellence (MEDCoE) is located at Fort Sam Houston, Joint Base San Antonio, Texas. MEDCoE comprises the Academy of Health Sciences (AHS), the 32nd Medical Brigade, and the AMEDD Noncommissioned Officers Academy (NCOA). MEDCoE enables effective and efficient integration and synchronization of Army Medical Department (AMEDD) Doctrine, Organization, Training, Material, Leadership, Personnel and Facility, and Policy (DOTMLPF-P) development to ensure the latest solutions to any perceived or predicted Army Medicine gaps are documented and incorporated into doctrine and instruction.

Although its institutional lineage dates back to 1920, the present "CoE" was established by permanent order of the Department of the Army in 2018 after realignment from the U.S. Army Medical Command (MEDCOM) to the U.S. Army Training and Doctrine Command (TRADOC), with operational control by the U.S. Army Combined Arms Center (CAC).

== History ==
On 1 September 1920, the Medical Department Field Service School was established at Carlisle Barracks, Pennsylvania at the request of the Surgeon General, Major General Merritte W. Ireland. In December that same year, the Army renamed it the Medical Field Service School (MFSS).

After 25 1/2 years of operation, the school was deactivated on 15 February 1946 and its mission transferred to multiple schools located at Fort Sam Houston, Texas. The school underwent various name changes and restructuring over the years; incorporating the diverse medical functional areas of the Army Medical Department (AMEDD) along the way. One significant change was on 10 December 1972, when the Secretary of the Army, Robert F. Froehlke re-designated the school to the Academy of Health Sciences.

On 15 July 1991, the Surgeon General, Lieutenant General Frank F. Ledford Jr., established the AMEDDC&S by permanent order 103-1. The Academy of Health Sciences (AHS) now constitutes the "school" portion of the AMEDDC&S.

In 1993, AMEDD Center and School was realigned under the U.S. Army Medical Command (Provisional) and remained under the U.S. Army Medical Command (MEDCOM) as it became fully functional in 1994.

As a result of 2005 BRAC legislation that required the bulk of enlisted technical medical training in the Army, Air Force, and Navy to be collocated to Fort Sam Houston, Texas, much of the enlisted medical training was moved from AHS to the Medical Education and Training Campus (METC). The transition took place during 2010 and 2011. In 2015, it was designated as the US Army Health Readiness Center of Excellence (HRCoE).

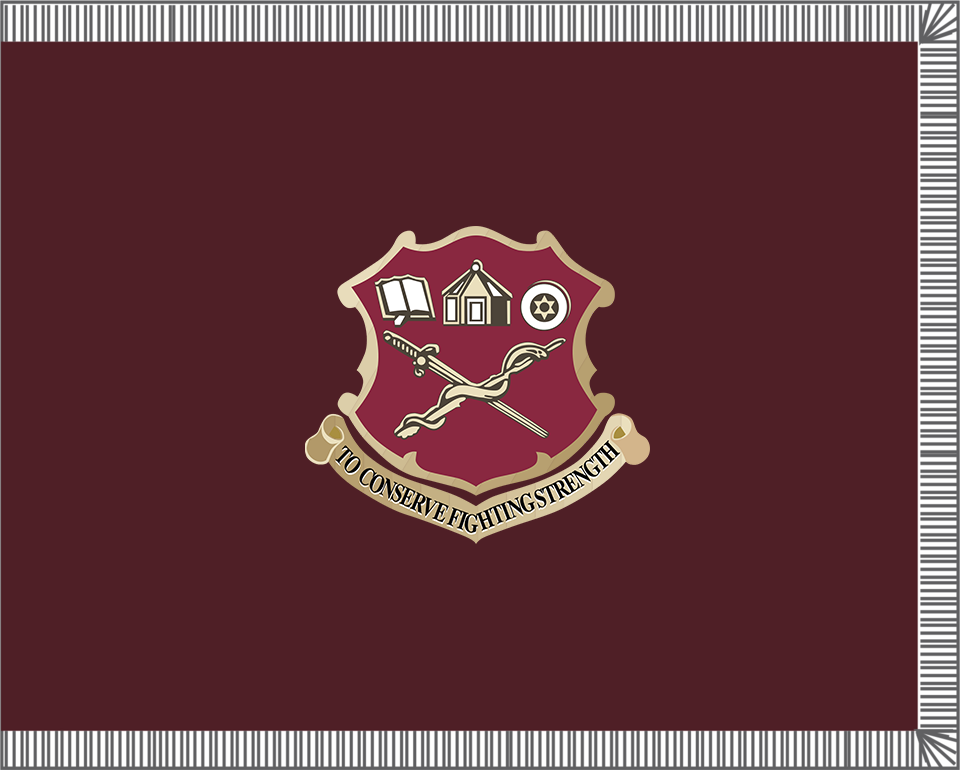
US Army Medical Center of Excellence Flag

In 2008, the Clinical Investigation Regulatory Office (CIRO) began realignment under the U.S. Army Medical Research and Materiel Command (USAMRMC).

In 2015, AMEDDC&S reorganized to become AMEDDC&S HRCoE. Also during this time period, the Defense Programs Defense Medical Readiness Training Institute (DMRTI) was realigned under the Defense Health Agency (DHA).

On 19 October 2018, AMEDDC&S HRCoE began realignment from the U.S. Army Medical Command (USAMEDCOM) to U.S. Army Training and Doctrine Command (TRADOC) with operational control by the U.S. Army Combined Arms Center, to be completed effective 2 October 2019.

Effective 15 September 2019, the CoE was finally redesignated as the U.S. Army Medical Center of Excellence (MEDCoE) to further solidify their abiding dedication to Army Medicine, reverence to their profound history, and their commitment towards Army modernization with the singular focus of training Soldiers who will win our nations wars and then come home safely.

== Structure ==
There are several major organizations that compose the U.S. Army Medical Center of Excellence:

=== Center components ===
- Office of the Commanding General
- Chief of Staff (CoS)
- Coordinating Staff, including the International Military Student Office
- Special Staff
- AMEDD Personnel Proponent Directorate (APPD)
- U.S. Army Medical Test and Evaluation Activity (MTEAC)
- Medical Capabilities Development and Integration Directorate (MEDCDID)
- Directorate of Training and Doctrine (DOTD)
- Department of Simulations (DOS)

=== School components ===
32d Medical Brigade

- 187th Medical Battalion
- 188th Medical Battalion
- 232d Medical Battalion
- 264th Medical Battalion

AMEDD Noncommissioned Officers Academy (NCOA)

- Advanced Leader Course (ALC)
- Senior Leader Course (SLC)

AMEDD Personnel Proponent Directorate (APPD)

MEDCOE Credentialing Program (MEDCP)

=== Other organizations ===
- Department of Simulations (DOS)
- Statistical Analysis Cell
- Fielded Force Integration Directorate (FFID)
- Army Capabilities Manager-Army Health System (ACM-AHS)
- The Army Medical Department Museum

== See also ==
- Fort Sam Houston, Texas (FSH-TX)
- Military Health System (MHS)
- Uniformed Services University of the Health Sciences (USUHS)
- Medical Education and Training Campus (METC)
- U.S. Army Medical Command (MEDCOM)
- U.S. Army Medical Department (AMEDD)
