= National Museum of Health and Medicine =

Museum in Silver Spring, Maryland, US

National Museum of Health and Medicine (founded as the Army Medical Museum)
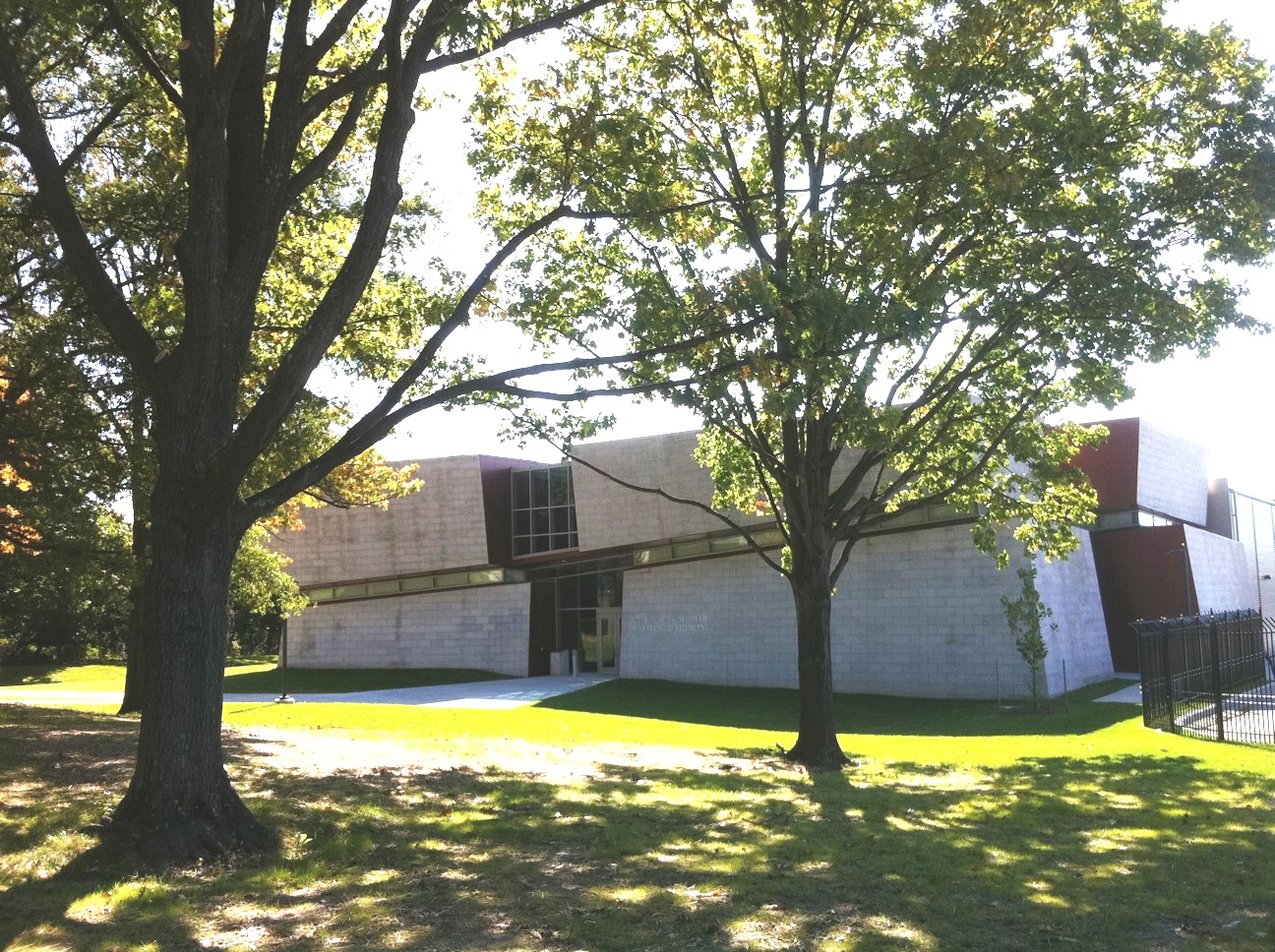
- The new NMHM facility, which opened on September 15, 2011.

- Location within Maryland National Museum of Health and Medicine (the United States)
- Established: 1862 (new building, 2011)
- Location: 2500 Linden Lane, Silver Spring, Maryland
- Coordinates: 39°0′32″N 77°3′14″W
- Type: Medicine, Military medicine
- Visitors: 40,000–50,000 annually
- Public transit access: Forest Glen
- Website: medicalmuseum.health.mil

The National Museum of Health and Medicine (NMHM) is a museum in Silver Spring, Maryland, near Washington, D.C. The museum was founded by U.S. Army Surgeon General William A. Hammond as the Army Medical Museum (AMM) in 1862; it became the NMHM in 1989 and relocated to its present site at the Army's Forest Glen Annex in 2012. An element of the Defense Health Agency (DHA), the NMHM is a member of the National Health Sciences Consortium.

== History ==
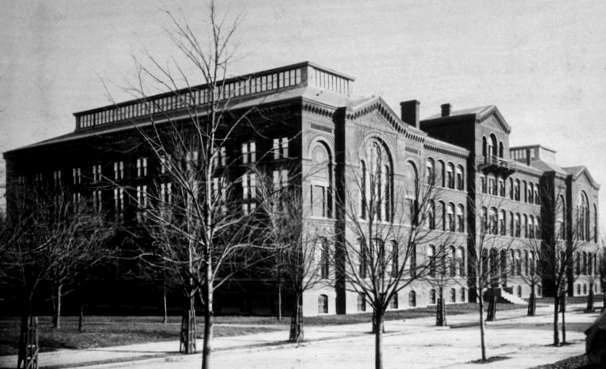
The Army Medical Museum and Library building housed the Army Medical Museum from 1887 to 1947, and again from 1962 to the building's destruction in 1969.

=== 19th century ===
The AMM was established during the American Civil War as a center for the collection of specimens for research in military medicine and surgery. In 1862, Hammond directed medical officers in the field to collect "specimens of morbid anatomy...together with projectiles and foreign bodies removed" and to forward them to the newly founded museum for study. The AMM's first curator, John H. Brinton, visited mid-Atlantic battlefields and solicited contributions from doctors throughout the Union Army. During and after the war, AMM staff took pictures of wounded soldiers showing the effects of gunshot wounds as well as results of amputations and other surgical procedures. The information collected was compiled into six volumes of The Medical and Surgical History of the War of the Rebellion, published between 1870 and 1883.

=== 20th century ===
During the late 19th and early 20th centuries, AMM staff engaged in various types of medical research. They pioneered in photomicrographic techniques, established a library and cataloging system which later formed the basis for the National Library of Medicine (NLM), and led the AMM into research on infectious diseases while discovering the cause of yellow fever. They contributed to research on vaccinations for typhoid fever, and during World War I, AMM staff were involved in vaccinations and health education campaigns, including major efforts to combat sexually transmissible diseases.

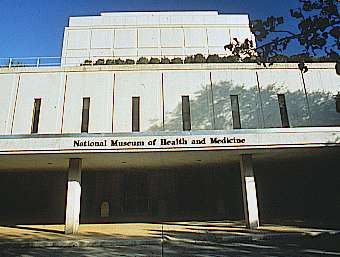
The former NMHM building (actually the basement of the AFIP building) on the Walter Reed Army Medical Center (WRAMC) garrison, Washington, D.C., where it was housed from 1971 to 2011.

By World War II, research at the AMM focused increasingly on pathology. In 1946 the AMM became a division of the new Army Institute of Pathology (AIP), which became the Armed Forces Institute of Pathology (AFIP) in 1949. The AMM's library and part of its archives were transferred to the National Library of Medicine when that institution was created in 1956. The AMM became the Medical Museum of the AFIP in 1949, the Armed Forces Medical Museum in 1974, and the NMHM in 1989. During its peak years on the National Mall in the 1960s, every year the museum saw "as many as 400,000 to 500,000 people coming through". But after its moves to increasingly obscure and out-of-the-way sites, it fell into a period of relative neglect. By the 1990s, it was attracting only between 40,000 and 50,000 visitors a year.

In 1989, C. Everett Koop (in his last year as Surgeon General) commissioned the "National Museum of Health and Medicine Foundation", a private, nonprofit organization to explore avenues for its future development and revitalization, intending to ultimately returning its collection to a venue on the National Mall. Proposed was “a site on land that is located east of and adjacent to the Hubert H. Humphrey Building (100 Independence Avenue, Southwest, in the District of Columbia)”. In 1993, a draft bill authored by Sen. Edward Kennedy proposed $21.8 million for moving the existing collection to a new facility to be constructed on that site. That bill, however, was never introduced owing to political difficulties including objections from Constance Breuer—widow of Marcel Breuer, architect of the Humphrey Building—who objected to the view obstruction that the proposed construction would entail. A letter from the Department of Defense to Koop in the mid-1990s, expressed hope that the NMHM exhibits would "one day be provided the appropriate and prominent home they deserve back at the National Mall in the new National Health Museum". The DoD backed away from contributing to funding a new museum. The foundation was superseded by a new organization, dedicated to creating a National Health Museum, that focused on public health education.

=== 2011 move ===
Due to the closure of Walter Reed Army Medical Center, National Museum of Health and Medicine relocated—for the tenth time—to U.S. Army Garrison-Forest Glen in Silver Spring, Montgomery County, Maryland.

Authority over the Forest Glen garrison was transferred from WRAMC to Fort Detrick in October 2008. The NMHM closed its exhibits on April 3, 2011, and reopened in a new building on May 14, 2012, at Forest Glen. On October 1, 2015, the NMHM became part of the Defense Health Agency.

== Holdings ==
=== Major collections ===
The NMHM embodies five collections consisting of about 25 million artifacts, including 5,000 skeletal specimens, 8,000 preserved organs, 12,000 items of medical equipment, an archive of historic medical documents, and collections related to neuroanatomy and developmental anatomy. The museum's most famous artifacts relate to President Abraham Lincoln and his assassination on April 14, 1865, by John Wilkes Booth.

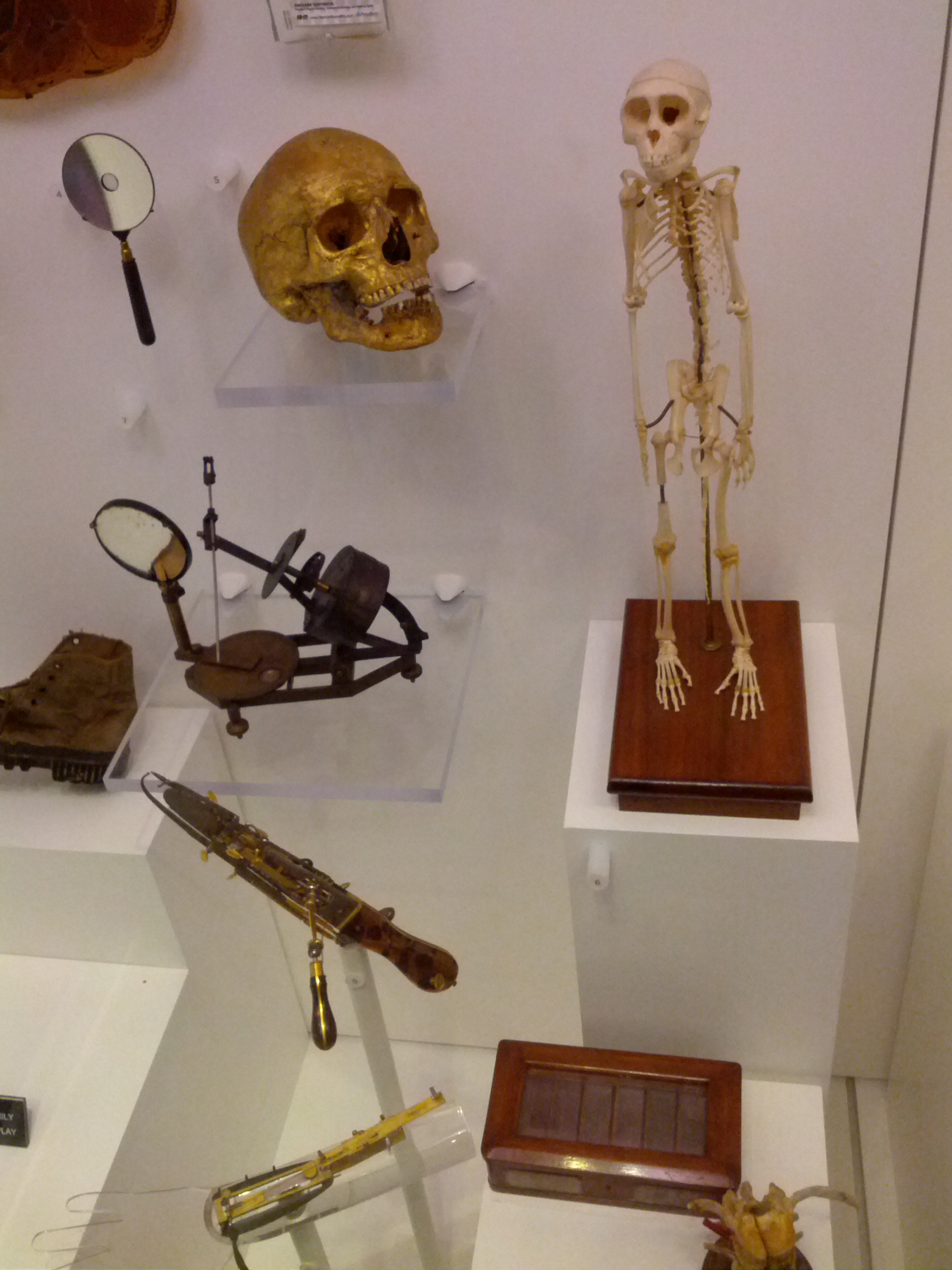
A typical display case at the museum. Clockwise from top right: the skeleton of Able, a rhesus macaque who was among the first primates ever to be sent to space; a box containing the tumor that killed Ulysses S. Grant, sectioned; a hand-cranked surgical saw used for cutting through bone in amputations, etc.; and a gilded skull, the first item in the museum's catalogue – original owner unknown.

On display is a copy by sculptor Avarel Fairbanks of Lincoln's life mask and hands made by Leonard Volk in 1860, the bullet fired from the Derringer pistol which ended the president's life, the probe used by the U.S. Army Surgeon General to locate the bullet during autopsy, pieces of Lincoln's hair and skull, and the autopsy surgeon's shirt cuff, stained with Lincoln's blood. Also on display is a small portion of Booth's spine, surgically removed to dislodge the bullet that killed him after his escape from justice ended at Port Royal, Virginia, fired from Union soldier Boston Corbett.

Museum collections include:

- The Historical Collections document changes in medical technology since the early 19th century. Included in this growing assemblage of more than 12,000 objects are x-ray equipment, microscopes, surgical instruments, numismatics and anatomical models.
- The Anatomical Collections are made up of bones and body parts. More than 5,000 skeletal specimens and 10,000 preserved organs document medical cases of disease and injury.
- The Otis Historical Archives houses photographs, illustrations, and documents related to health and medicine. More than 350 different collections document, in pictures and words, the practice of medicine from the Civil War to the present.
- The Human Developmental Anatomy Center maintains the largest collection of embryologic material in the United States. The center is known for its imaging and 3-D reconstructions of embryo development.
- The Neuroanatomical Collections comprise nine different collections focusing on human and non-human neuroanatomy and neuropathology.

=== Major exhibitions ===
Museum exhibition Galleries feature several permanent exhibits alongside several rotating displays.

In this category, the museum houses a notable holding brought directly from the Middle East, “Trauma Bay II, Balad, Iraq”. The exhibit features a section of the actual emergency room tent used at Balad, Iraq, from 2003 to 2007. These operating theaters throughout Iraq have posting survival rates topping 95%. Arrangements were made to ship these items from Iraq when a visiting US Congressional delegation was moved by the stories they had heard.

- Anatomy and Pathology: These specimens provide examples of healthy anatomical structures. Healthy specimens establish a reference point for anatomical study. Comparing healthy specimens with diseased or injured tissues can help illustrate the changes caused by illness and trauma. Understanding these processes is often the first step towards improved prevention and treatment.
- Collection that Teaches: The Army Medical Museum, nearly from the time of its founding in 1862, was engaged in an innovative effort to collect, collate and share the lessons of battlefield medicine during the course of the Civil War.
- Abraham Lincoln: The Final Casualty of the War: To mark the 200th anniversary of President Abraham Lincoln's birth in 2015, NMHM honors the 16th president of the United States with this exhibition of items associated with his last hours and the physicians who cared for him. artifacts.
- Advances in military medicine: These exhibits include Object Theater: Meeting Challenges, Generating Innovations; Innovations in Repair, Facial Reconstruction, Surgical Response, Protection, Research, Transportation, Rehabilitation; The Legacy of Walter Reed; and Trauma Bay II, Balad, Iraq, which offers a view inside a former Air Force tent hospital in Balad, Iraq.

Past exhibits include

- To Bind Up the Nation's Wounds: Medicine During the Civil War shows Civil War medicine from the perspective of battlefield surgeons and the stories of Union and Confederate sick and wounded.
- Evolution of the Microscope displays collections in tracing the development of the basic tool of the bioscientist over the last 400 years.
- Battlefield Surgery 101: From the Civil War to Vietnam, exclusively from the museum's historical archives and historical collections, presents military surgical activities over the last 140 years through a selection of photographs and 19th- and 20th-century
- Resolved: Advances in Forensic Identification of U.S. War Dead highlights forensic sciences in the nation's commitment to the identification and commemoration of U.S. service members.

=== Programs offered ===
Flier for October 8, 2011 NMHM Science Café.

The museum offers programs on topics in medical, scientific, and historical subjects. It is for children and adults.

- Public Programs
- Tours
- Brain Awareness Week

== Location and hours ==
The museum is located at 2500 Linden Lane in Silver Spring, Maryland, one mile outside the District of Columbia. It is open from 10 a.m. to 5:30 p.m. Wednesday through Sunday except Christmas, and admission is free.

== See also ==
- Army Medical Museum and Library
- United States Army Medical Department Museum
- Daniel Sickles's leg
