= United States Army Medical Department Museum =

Museum in San Antonio, Texas

Coordinates: 29°27′41″N 98°26′17″W

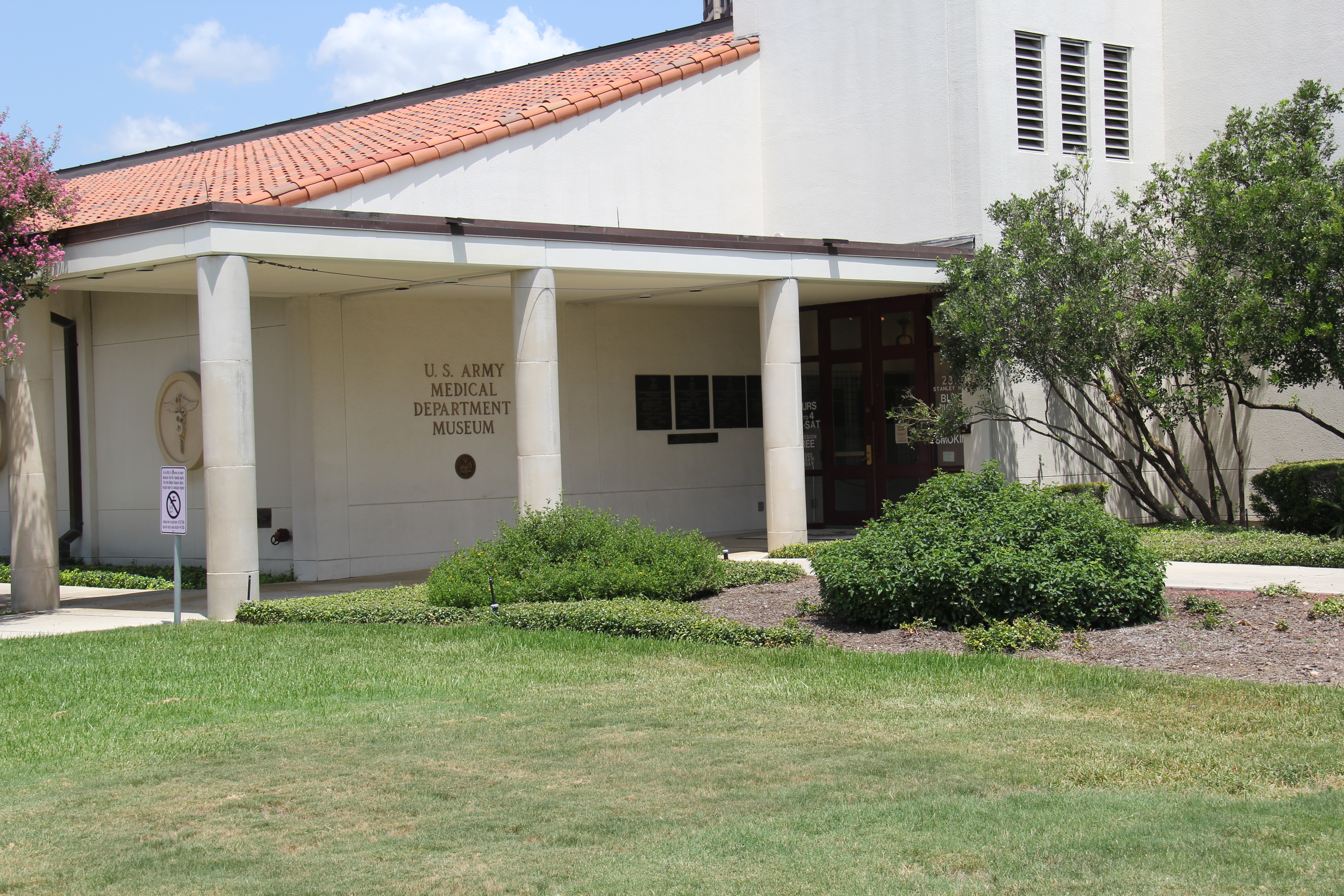
- United States Army Medical Department Museum Entrance
- Location: Joint Base San Antonio

The U.S. Army Medical Department Museum — or AMEDD Museum — at Fort Sam Houston, San Antonio, Texas, originated as part of the Army's Field Service School at Carlisle Barracks, Pennsylvania. It moved to Fort Sam Houston in 1946. It is currently a component of the U.S. Army Medical Department Center and School.

The museum features the history of the Army Medical Department from 1775 to the present, as well as medical contributions of the Army during times of peace and war. General areas covered are significant historical events, scientific and technological advances, development of the medical field service and contributions of key officers and enlisted personnel. Audio-visual presentations introduce the history of the Department. Two large galleries house the medical equipment, uniforms, medals, insignia and artwork that make up the museum's exhibits. Museum holdings include material on medical personnel, POWs in World War II's Pacific Theater, unit insignia and archival documents and photographs.

The museum has been chosen to preserve historic artifacts from Naval Hospital Corps School Great Lakes. BRAC 2005 resulted in transferred of Corps School from Chicago to the Medical Education and Training Campus (METC), also located on Fort Sam Houston.

== Exhibits ==
Specific displays of interest include:

- Dr. William Beaumont, the Army surgeon known as the "Father of Gastric Physiology"
- Brigadier General George Sternberg, MD, the Surgeon General known as the "Father of American Bacteriology"
- MASH (Mobile Army Surgical Hospital) units in Korea
- Medical air evac in Vietnam
- Combat Medic Medal of Honor recipients (43 from 1861 to 1970)
- Images of all (but one) of the Army Surgeons General
- Aftermath of the 1876 Battle of the Little Bighorn in Montana

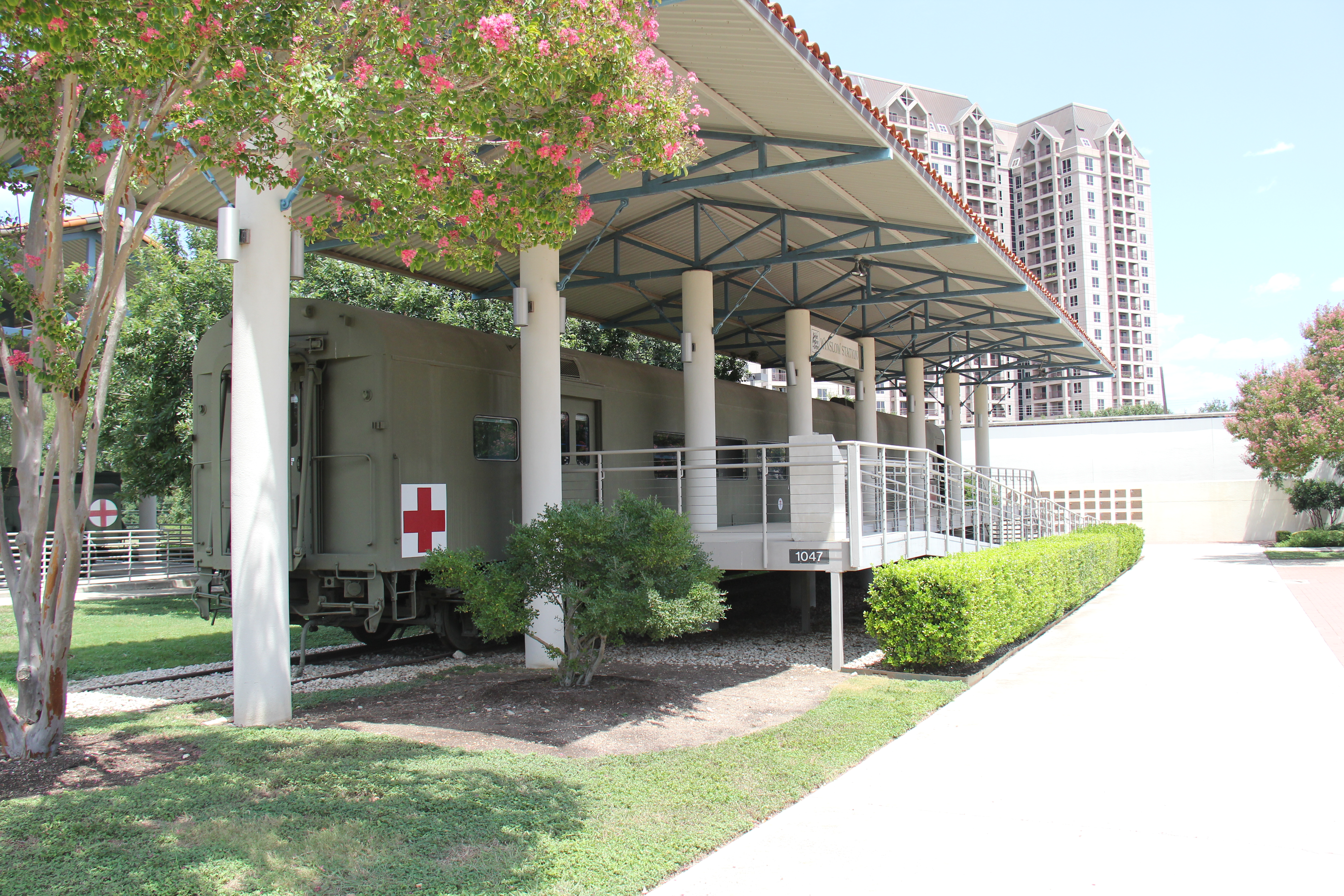
Hospital train ambulance car

Outside the museum are examples of medical vehicles including ambulances and a fully equipped hospital train ambulance car. A Medical Combat Memorial honors the Army's combat medics.

== See also ==
- Army Medical Museum and Library
- List of ships of the United States Army § Hospital ships
