= United States Army Medical Department Captains Career Course =

The United States Army Medical Department (AMEDD) Captains Career Course (CCC) is an Officer Advance Course (OAC) taught at Fort Sam Houston, Texas that provides graduate level leadership training for all six special officer branches (corps) in the AMEDD.

The AMEDD Captains Career Course is designed to train officers to lead company or equivalent-sized organizations and serve successfully in U.S. Army staff positions. Graduates are prepared for subsequent assignments by learning the leader, tactical, and technical tasks, including the supporting knowledge and skills necessary to support joint operations across the full spectrum of military operations.

== History ==
In 1994 the AMEDD Director of Personnel raised the issue of a combined, all-corps AMEDD Officer Advance Course (OAC) to promote consistency in education for AMEDD officers competing for command positions.

The AMEDD Center and School (AMEDDC&S) initiated the reengineered course in 1996. The course consisted of a distance learning phase followed by ten weeks of resident training (forty-five days all corps and one week for corps-specific training).

In 2001, the Commanding General of the AMEDDC&S at the time further reduced the length of the course to nine weeks of resident training (forty-three days all corps and two days for corps-specific training).

== Organization ==
Academic Structure

- AMEDD Center & School

- Academy of Health Sciences

- Leader Training Center

- Captains Career Course Branch

Administrative Structure

- AMEDD Center & School

- 32nd Medical Brigade

- 187th Medical Battalion

- Alpha Company

== Phases and Variations ==
The AMEDD Captains Career Course is organized into two phases. Phase I consisting of distributed learning (dL) that must be complete before moving on to the next phase. Phase II consists of a temporary duty (TDY) resident phase at Fort Sam Houston, Texas. Depending on which version of the course students are attending, Phase II can be up to nine weeks long.

Title	ATTRS Course #	Length	Target Audience
Captains Career Course	6-8-C22	9 Weeks	All corps; Active Component
Combined Logistics Captains Career Course Phase II (Note: Other phases of CLC3 overseen and executed at the Army Logistics University at Fort Lee, Virginia.)	6-8-C22(CLC3)	5 Weeks	Medical Operations and Logistics Officers
Medical Corps Course (Note: Not a permanent course.)	6-8-C22(MC)	2 Weeks	Medical Corps Officers overdue but unable to attend regular 9 Week Course
Reserve Component Course	6-8-C22(RC)	2 Weeks	Reserve and National Guard Officers

== See also ==
- Fort Sam Houston, Texas
- Military Health System
