= Army Medical Museum and Library =

Building in Washington, D.C. (1887–1969)

Coordinates: 38.888256°N 77.022829°W

- U.S. National Register of Historic Places
- U.S. National Historic Landmark
- D.C. Inventory of Historic Sites
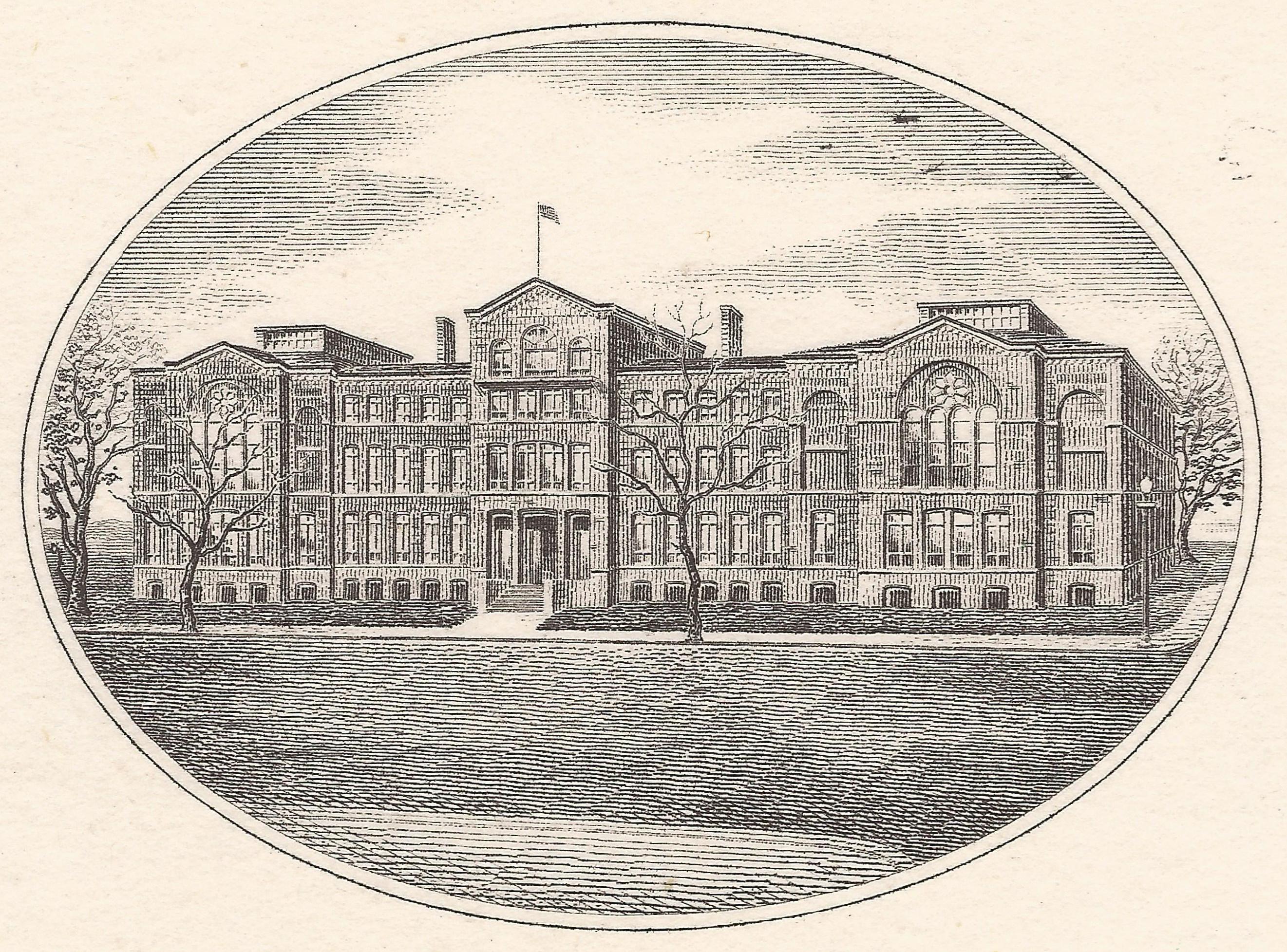

- Location within the District of Columbia
- Location: South B Street [now Independence Avenue] and 7th Street, SW, Washington, D.C.)
- Built: 1887
- Architect: Adolf Cluss
- Architectural style: Romanesque
- NRHP reference No.: 66000854

Significant dates
- Added to NRHP: October 15, 1966
- Designated NHL: January 12, 1965
- Designated DCIHS: March 3, 1979

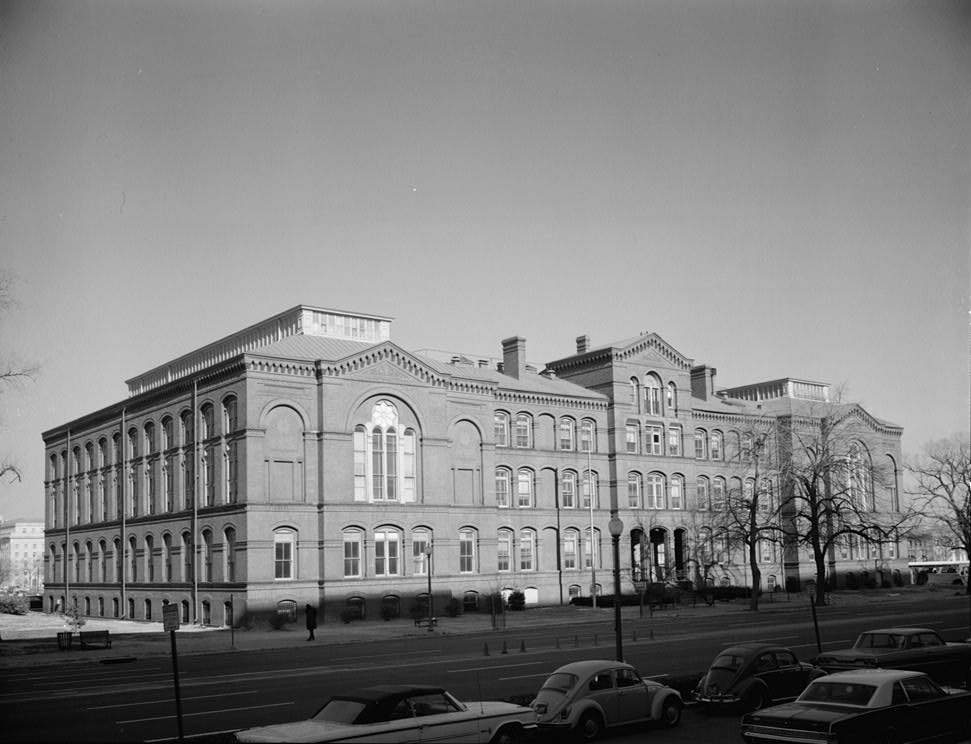
The AMML in 1969.

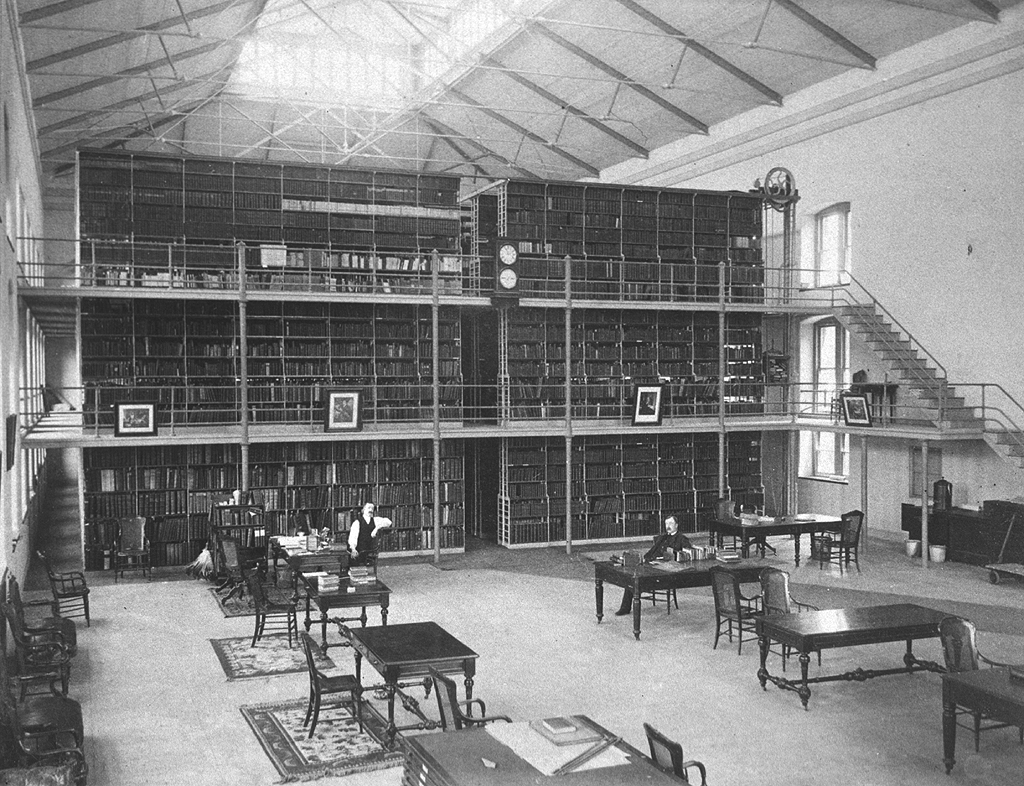
Library Hall at the AMML; Dr John Shaw Billings (1838–1913) sits at a table on the right; Photo ca. 1890.

The Army Medical Museum and Library (AMML) of the U.S. Army was a large brick building constructed in 1887 at South B Street (now Independence Avenue) and 7th Street, SW, Washington, D.C., which is directly on the National Mall. It was designated a National Historic Landmark in 1965 and added to the National Register of Historic Places in 1966. The building was demolished in 1969, and the collections at the focus of the landmark designation were dispersed.

== History ==
=== Building ===
The AMML was designed by German-born architect Adolf Cluss (1825–1905) to house the Army Medical Museum, the Library of the Surgeon General's Office (later called the Army Medical Library), and some of the Army's medical records. Between 1893 and 1910, it also housed the Army Medical School.

The AMML remained on the Mall until the 1960s, when the Museum and Library were moved to their present separate locations. The old building (known affectionately as "Old Red" or "The Old Pickle Factory") was razed and replaced by the Smithsonian's Hirshhorn Museum and Sculpture Garden in 1969.

=== Collection ===
The AMML collection had its origins in the federal government's decision in 1862, during the American Civil War, to begin a collection of items of medical and surgical interest related to the treatment of Union Army wounded and sick in the war. At first focused on diseases related to the military (a major cause of death and incapacity during that war), it grew over the next two decades to include a wider array of samples for the use of military medical investigators. In 1888 the collection was formally opened to civilian medical researchers as well.

The collection resided in a variety of buildings prior to the construction of the AMML building in 1887, including Ford's Theatre. It remained in the AMML building until October 1968, at which point it was dispersed. Its principal successor is the National Museum of Health and Medicine in Silver Spring, Maryland.

== Successor institutions ==
- The Armed Forces Institute of Pathology (AFIP) was located on the campus of Walter Reed Army Medical Center from February 1955 until its disestablishment on May 15, 2011
- The National Museum of Health and Medicine, located in Forest Glen Annex of Fort Detrick Silver Spring, Maryland beginning September 15, 2011. It is now part of the U.S. Army Medical Research and Materiel Command.
- The Library of Surgeon General's Office, after various name changes (Army Medical Library, Armed Forces Medical Library) became the National Library of Medicine (NLM) – then a part of the U.S. Public Health Service – in 1956. The NLM moved to the National Institutes of Health campus in Bethesda, Maryland in 1961.

== See also ==
- United States Army Medical Department Museum
- National Museum of the United States Army § Other Army museums
- List of National Historic Landmarks in Maryland
- National Register of Historic Places listings in Montgomery County, Maryland
