= Naval Hospital Corps School =

United States Navy's only basic hospital corpsman school

Naval Hospital Corps School was the United States Navy's only basic hospital corpsman school. It was located within Lake County, Illinois, at 601 D St., Bldg 130H, Naval Station, Great Lakes, Illinois 60088, for nearly a century.

== History ==
It was established in January 1913. It is an "A" School. Its mission is to field Basic Hospital Corpsmen into the fleet. The mission of Naval Hospital Corps School is to develop, teach basic principles and techniques of patient care and first aid procedures and put forward Hospital Corpsmen into the fleet: aboard ships, aboard Naval Hospitals, Department of Defense medical facilities, with United States Marine Corps units, or elsewhere. Previously there were hospital corps schools located in San Diego, CA and Orlando, FL, and Bainbridge, MD.

The Naval Hospital Corps School at Great Lakes IL closed after the last class graduated on July 28, 2011. Its last class was Class 11-125. The school relocated – along with the newly commissioned Naval Medicine Training Center command – to the Medical Education and Training Campus at Fort Sam Houston, Joint Base San Antonio, Texas. The Naval Hospital Corps "A" School curriculum has varied in length over the years. In 1979 it was 10 weeks in duration, the change to the current 14-week duration occurred as part of a new curriculum implemented in July 2017, with the first class under this length graduating in October of that year.

== See also ==
- Hospital Corpsman Pledge
- Hospital Corpsman Prayer
