= 232d Medical Battalion =

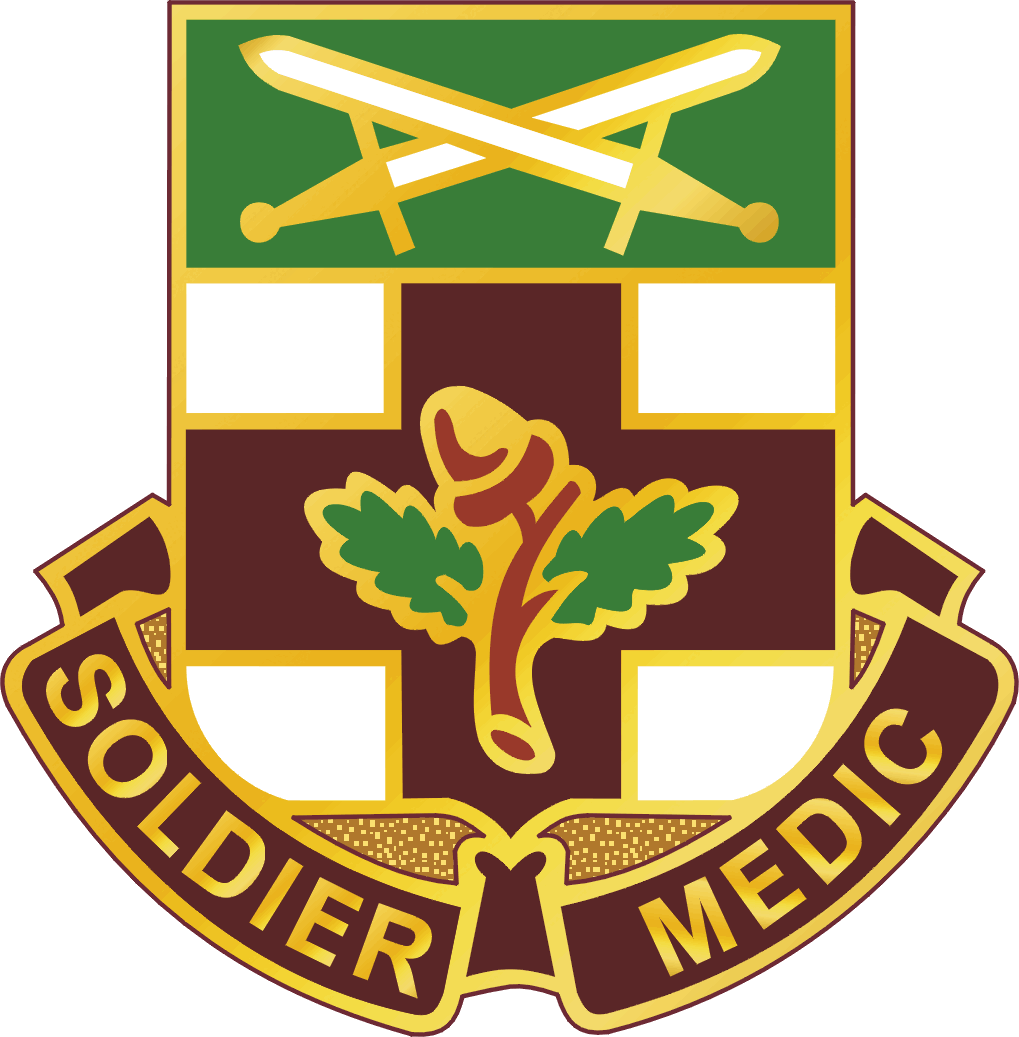
- 232d Medical Battalion Distinguished Unit Insignia
- Country: United States
- Branch: Army
- Type: Medical
- Role: Medical Training
- Size: Battalion
- Garrison/HQ: Fort Sam Houston, TX
- Motto(s): Soldier Medic Warrior Spirit
- Website: 32d Medical Brigade

Commanders
- Commander: LTC Jordan P. Gammons
- Command Sergeant Major: CSM Tyrone Thompson

The 232d Medical Battalion is a medical battalion in the United States Army formed in 1944. The unit is a part of the 32d Medical Brigade. The 232nd Medical Battalion, the largest of its kind within the 32nd Medical Brigade, operates under the U.S. Army Medical Center of Excellence. It facilitates the training of over 4,000 combat medics each year.

It is also responsible for training 68W combat medics, which is the second largest military operational specialty (MOS) in the U.S. Army.

== Structure ==
The following units are subordinate to the battalion:

- Alpha Company
- Bravo Company
- Charlie Company
- Delta Company
- Echo Company
- Foxtrot Company
- Headquarters & Headquarters Company

== Lineage ==
Constituted 15 July 1944 in the Army of the United States as the 232d Medical Composite Battalion

Activated 15 August 1944 in Italy

Inactivated 1 May 1946 in Italy

Redesignated 27 September 1951 as Headquarters, 232d Medical Service Battalion, and allotted to the Regular Army

Activated 16 November 1951 in Korea

Inactivated 24 January 1953 in Korea

Redesignated 27 July 1987 as the 232d Medical Battalion; Headquarters concurrently transferred to the United States Army Health Services Command (later redesignated as the United States Army Medical Command) and activated at Fort Sam Houston, Texas

== Campaign participation credit ==
- World War II
  - Rome-Arno
- Korean War
  - UN Summer-Fall Offensive
  - Second Korean Winter
  - Korea, Summer-Fall 1952
  - Third Korean Winter

== Decorations ==
- Meritorious Unit Commendation (Army), Streamer embroidered ITALY
- Republic of Korea Presidential Unit Citation, Stream embroidered KOREA 1952-1953
