= Fort Sam Houston =

US Army post in San Antonio, Texas

- Part of Joint Base San Antonio
- San Antonio, Texas in United States of America
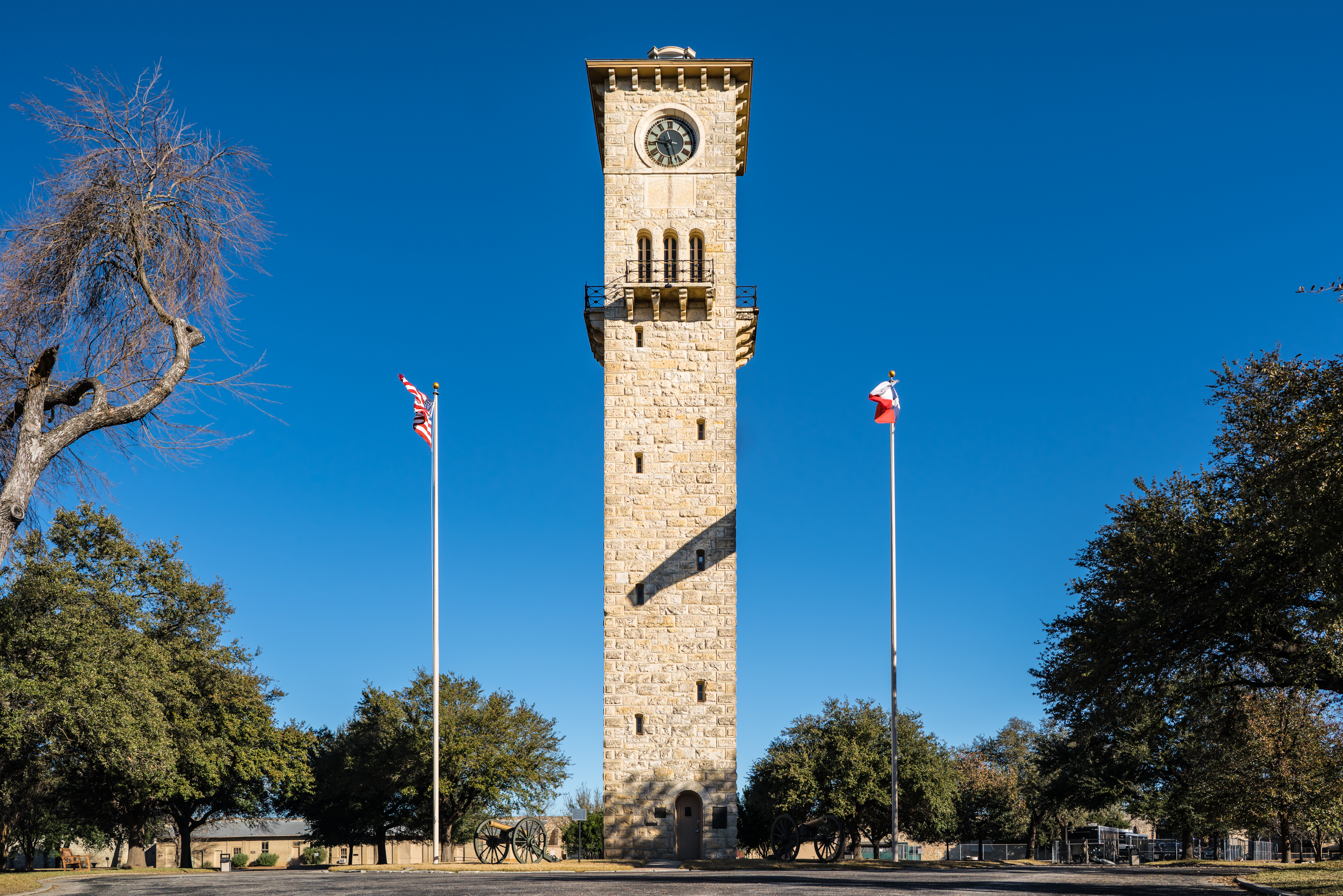
- Clocktower on the Quadrangle

Site information
- Type: U.S. Army post
- Owner: Department of Defense

Location
- Location within Texas Location within the United States
- Coordinates: 29°27′27″N 98°26′24″W

Site history
- Built: 1876
- Fort Sam Houston
- U.S. National Register of Historic Places
- U.S. National Historic Landmark District
- Area: 400 acres (160 ha)
- NRHP reference No.: 75001950

Significant dates
- Added to NRHP: 15 May 1975
- Designated NHLD: 15 May 1975

Fort Sam Houston is a U.S. Army post in San Antonio, Texas. Known colloquially as "Fort Sam", it is named for the first president of the Republic of Texas, Sam Houston.

The installation's missions include serving as the command headquarters for United States Army North, United States Army South, the Army Medical Command (MEDCOM) headquarters, the Army Medical Department (AMEDD) Center and School, the Fifth Recruiting Brigade, Navy Regional Recruiting, the San Antonio Military Entrance and Processing Station, and the Medical Education and Training Campus (METC). On 1 October 2010, Fort Sam Houston joined Lackland Air Force Base and Randolph Air Force Base to create Joint Base San Antonio, under Air Force administration.

== Hosted units ==
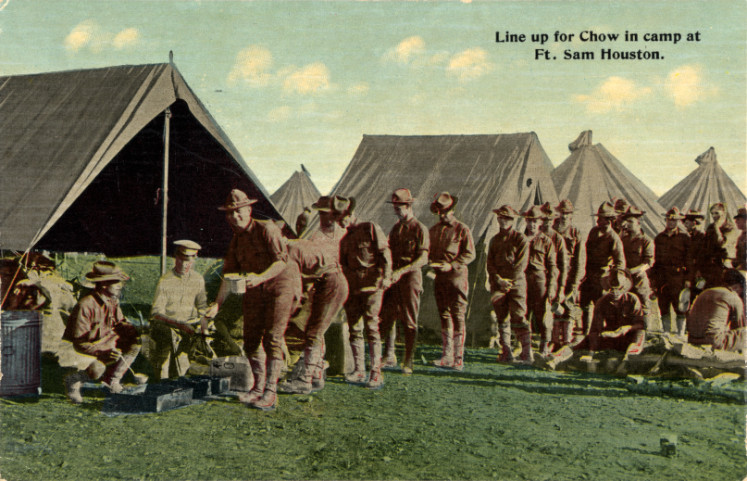
Line up for chow in camp at Fort Sam Houston

U. S. Department of Defense (DoD) Elements

- Medical Education and Training Campus (METC)
United States Military Entrance Processing Command (USMEPCOM) Elements
- MEPS San Antonio

U. S. Army Elements

U.S. Army North (ARNORTH) Elements
- HQ, U.S. Army North (Fifth US Army)
- 323rd Army Band
U. S. Army Installation Management Command (IMCOM) Elements
- HQ, U.S. Army IMCOM
- IMCOM West
- Mission Training Complex
U. S. Army Medical Command (MEDCOM) Elements
- HQ, U.S. Army MEDCOM
- U.S. Army Veterinary Command (VETCOM)
- U.S. Army Dental Command (DENCOM)
- Southern Regional Medical Command (SRMC)
  - Brooke Army Medical Center (BAMC)
    - Troop Command, Brooke Army Medical Center, HHC & companies A–D
    - Warrior Transition Battalion, Brooke Army Medical Center
- U.S. Army Institute of Surgical Research (ISR)
- U.S. Army Medical Department Center and School Health Readiness Center of Excellence (AMEDDC&S HRCoE)
  - Academy of Health Sciences
  - 32nd Medical Brigade
    - 187th Medical Battalion, HHD & companies A–D
    - 232rd Medical Battalion, HHD & companies A–H
    - 264th Medical Battalion, HHD & companies A–F
    - Training Support Company (TSC)
    - U.S. Army Medical Department Student Detachment
  - Non-Commissioned Officer Academy
  - Defense Medical Readiness Training Institute (DMRTI)
- US Army Medical Information and Technology Center (USAMITC)
U.S. Army South (ARSOUTH) Elements
- HQ, U.S. Army South (Sixth US Army)
U.S. Army Forces Command (FORSCOM) Elements
- 5501st US Army Hospital
- 418th Medical Logistics Company
- 591st Medical Logistics Company
- 470th Blood Detachment
- 79th Ordnance Battalion (Explosive Ordnance Disposal)
U.S. Army Recruiting Command (USAREC) Elements
- U.S. Army Fifth Recruiting Brigade
- 5th Brigade, U.S. Army Cadet Command
Army Contracting Command Elements
- 410th Contracting Support Brigade
Mission and Installation Contracting Command
- 412th Contracting Support Brigade
U.S. Army Criminal Investigation Command
- 6th Region CID Ft. Sam Houston
- 25th Military Police Detachment
U.S. Army Intelligence and Security Command (INSCOM) Elements
- 470th Military Intelligence Brigade, HHC & companies A–B
U.S. Army Network Enterprise & Technology Command
- 106th Signal Brigade
U.S. Army Environmental Command

U. S. Air Force Elements

- HQ, 502nd Air Base Wing
- 502nd Mission Support Group (replaced the garrison command)
- Camp Bullis

== Senior command ==
United States Army North is the senior command and responsible for all Army activities on Fort Sam Houston, but not for the post itself. Commanded by LTG Allan Pepin, Army North's primary missions are land-based Homeland Defense, Defense Support of Civil Authorities and Theater Security Cooperation with the Bahamas, Canada and Mexico. Because Fort Sam Houston is part of Joint Base San Antonio, the installation commander is the commander of the 502d Air Base Wing.

== History ==
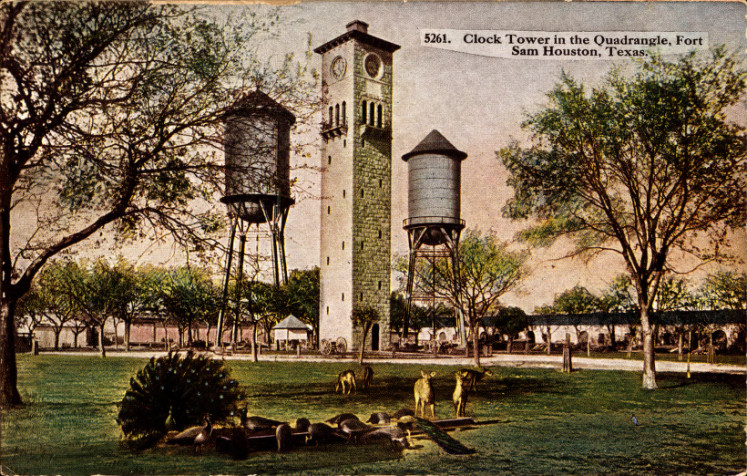
Illustration from a postcard of the Quadrangle at Fort Sam Houston

Construction at Fort Sam Houston began in the mid-1870s under the supervision of the military commander of the Department of Texas, Major General Edward Ord, a West Point-trained army engineer. As one of the Army's oldest installations with more than 900 buildings in its historic districts, Fort Sam Houston boasts one of the largest collection of historic military post structures. The significant contributions of Fort Sam Houston to the United States were recognized in 1975 when the post was designated as a National Historic Landmark.

The Sundry Civil Service Bill of 3 March 1873 included a $100,000 allotment for a new army post in San Antonio, on 93 acres (38 ha) of land deeded by the city on Government Hill. Edward Braden Construction Co. won the contract to build the post on 7 June 1876, for $83,900 ($2.54 million in 2025). Included on the Quadrangle was a combination 87 feet (27 m) tall watchtower and 6,400 US gal (24,000 L) water tank designed by General Montgomery C. Meigs, based on one he had seen in Europe, and which he called "his work of art".

On 19 February 1877, the new train station on Austin Street opened, connecting San Antonio to Galveston. The quartermasters soon moved their depot supplies from the Alamo to the Quadrangle, and the headquarters of the "Post at San Antonio" moved in on 22 December 1879.

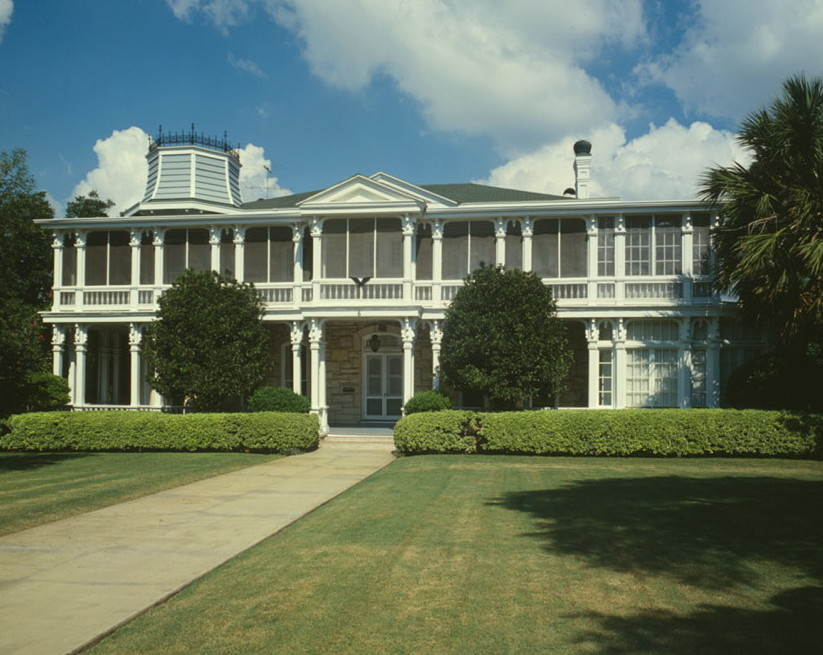
Pershing House

In 1880, fifteen officers' quarters were designed by architect Alfred Giles, west of the Quadrangle, and bordering a parade ground. This included the Commanding General's home, constructed in 1881, now known as the Pershing House, and first occupied by Brig. Gen. Christopher Augur.

Between 1885 and 1893, 60 additional buildings were built on 43 acres (17 ha), Upper post or Infantry Post, purchased by the army east of the Quadrangle, including the 1893 Band Barracks overlooking another parade ground. The hospital, now known as Sam Houston House, was built in 1886. The post was formally named Fort Sam Houston on 11 September 1890.

The Fort Sam Houston Quadrangle, built by George Henry Griebel, is the oldest structure at Fort Sam Houston. The quadrangle was originally a supply depot. During that time, it housed the Apache war chief Geronimo and warriors captured with him, while the Federal government decided whether to treat them as prisoners of war (POWs) or common criminals. Legend has it that the deer in the Quadrangle were there because Geronimo refused to eat food he did not hunt. The deer pre-date Geronimo in the Quadrangle. It is unknown why the deer and peacocks were introduced into the confined courtyard of the Quadrangle.

The Quadrangle includes an office complex housing the commanding general and staff of U.S. Army North as well as the Fort Sam Houston Museum. The base has maintained the historical integrity of the post's different sections, which represent different eras of construction, and reflect various Army concepts in planning and design. Careful preservation of these areas allows the post to live with its history, surrounded by the traditions established when the first soldier arrived here in 1845.

The Gift Chapel was dedicated by President William Taft on 17–18 October 1909.

During World War II, space at the fort was made available for up to 1,000 German POWs. This took place on 15 September 1942 while POW camps could be built.

== Military medicine ==
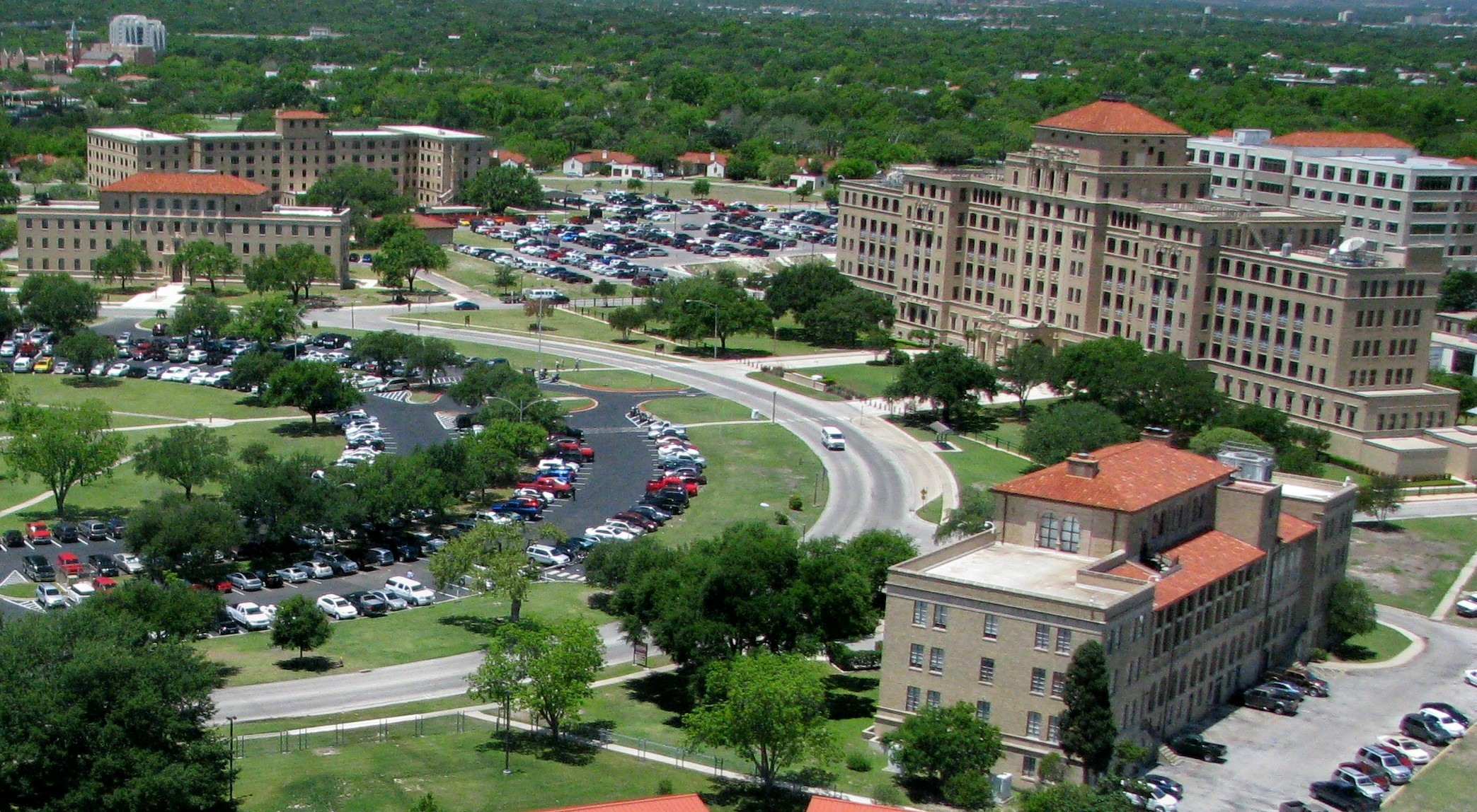
Aerial view of the Old Brooke Army Medical Center

Fort Sam Houston is known as the "Home of Army Medicine" and "Home of the Combat Medic". At the end of World War II, the Army decided to make Fort Sam Houston its principal medical training facility. In conjunction with this decision came the determination to develop Brooke General Hospital into one of the Army's premier medical centers. This combined the capabilities of Wilford Hall Medical Center located at nearby Lackland Air Force Base to create the largest medical treatment facility and teaching hospital in the Department of Defense. Construction associated with this transition increased the square footage of the hospital by 50%, including a much larger, variable capacity emergency department, additional surgical suites and recovery facilities, as well as teaching facilities and bed space. Despite the installation transitioning to Air Force control, the command and control of the facility will remain with the Army. The command and other key positions will rotate between the Army and Air Force. Staffing consist of members of both services, as well as a large number of civilians.

As of 2011, Fort Sam Houston is the largest and most important military medical training facility in the world. Military medical training is provided by numerous elements, including Military Education and Training Campus (METC), AMEDD Center and School, Brooke Army Medical Center, US Army Institute of Surgical Research, The Center for Battlefield Health and Trauma, Defense Medical Readiness Training Institute, as well as many smaller organizations.

Known as the brain trust for the AMEDD, the Army Medical Department Center and School annually trains more than 25,000 students attending 170 officer, NCO and enlisted courses in 14 medical specialties. The command maintains several academic affiliations for bachelor's and master's degree programs with major universities such as Baylor University, University of Texas Health Science Centers at Houston and San Antonio, and the University of Nebraska–Lincoln.

As a result of the Base Realignment and Closure Commission (BRAC) 2005 recommendations, all military medical training has been consolidated at Fort Sam Houston. This consolidation concluded with the opening of the METC in 2011. The Navy moved its medical training from San Diego, California; Great Lakes, Illinois; and Portsmouth, Virginia. The Air Force moved its medical training from Sheppard Air Force Base in Wichita Falls, Texas. This increased the average student load and required additional support staff. The expansion in training has required construction approaching one billion dollars, a windfall of federal investment in Texas.

== Community connections ==
Throughout its existence, a close and harmonious relationship has prevailed between Fort Sam Houston and the City of San Antonio. The two have grown and matured together. The city often has been called the "mother-in-law of the Army" because so many soldiers, including Dwight D. Eisenhower, met their future spouses there. After the September 11, 2001 terrorist attacks, in 2003 the Army decided to close New Braunfels Avenue to through traffic. Until this closure, New Braunfels Avenue had been a major north–south thoroughfare used by soldiers and San Antonio citizens alike; this had the result of closing many businesses near the north and south entrances from New Braunfels Avenue.

More than 27,000 military and civilian personnel work at the post, with an annual payroll and operating budget of $1.9 billion. Local purchases made by installation activities total almost $105 million annually. Funding for construction projects on post average $30 million annually. Fort Sam Houston has also initiated public–private partnerships to renovate and adaptively reuse significant historic buildings.

In June 2006, the San Antonio Express-News reported that Fort Sam Houston received utility disconnection notices due to budget constraints.

Fort Sam Houston is one of three military facilities in Texas (all in the San Antonio area) to have its own school district, the Fort Sam Houston Independent School District.

The United States Postal Service operates the Fort Sam Houston Post Office at 1804 Stanley Road.

== Notable postings ==
Several notable figures have served at the fort, including Arthur MacArthur Jr., Leonard Wood, Benjamin Foulois, Frederick Funston, and John J. Pershing. Maj. Gen. John Wilson Ruckman, Commander of the Southern Department, was based at Fort Sam Houston just after the Houston Riot of 1917. Brig. Gen. Billy Mitchell was posted there after being demoted to colonel for disobeying orders. Dwight D. Eisenhower was posted to Fort Sam Houston twice during his career, as was Walter Krueger. During Eisenhower's first posting from 1915 to 1917, he met and married Mamie Doud. He was posted at the fort when the attack on Pearl Harbor occurred in 1941. Their first home is one of the buildings preserved as an historic monument. Gen. Wainwright took command of the Fourth United States Army here in 1946.

== See also ==
- Russell W. Volckmann
- Fort Sam Houston National Cemetery
- United States Army Medical Department Museum
- Dodd Army Airfield
- United States Army Medical Department Captains Career Course
- List of World War II prisoner-of-war camps in the United States
- Thomas Quinton Donaldson Jr.
