= Medical Education and Training Campus =

US Department of Defense Medical College at JB San Antonio, TX

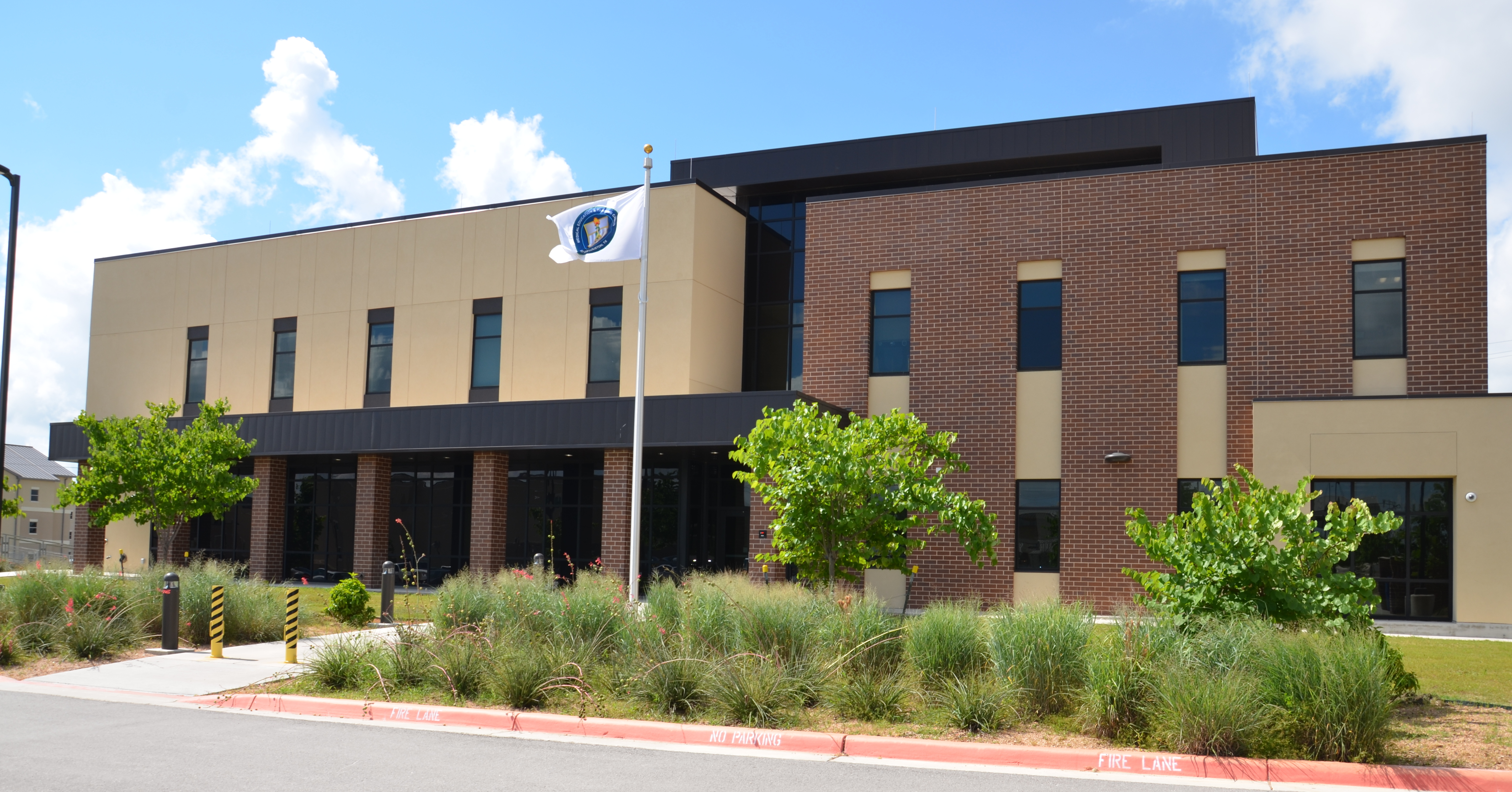
- METC Headquarters Building
- Active: 2005 – present
- Country: United States
- Branch: Tri-service
- Type: Medical
- Role: Training
- Garrison/HQ: Fort Sam Houston; San Antonio, Texas, U.S.
- Website: http://www.metc.mil/

Commanders
- Commandant: Colonel Jack Davis, US Army

Insignia

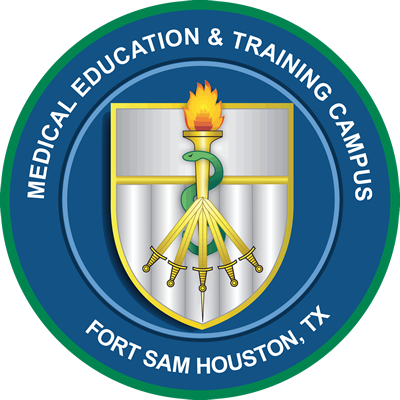

The Medical Education and Training Campus (METC) is a United States Department of Defense (DoD) integrated campus under a single university-style administration, with nearly 50 programs of study available to U.S. military enlisted students and a small number of foreign military students. METC is located at Joint Base San Antonio on Fort Sam Houston, Texas, with a field training site located at Camp Bullis.

== Base Realignment and Closure ==
METC is the result of the 2005 BRAC legislation that required the bulk of enlisted technical medical training in the Army, Air Force, and Navy to be collocated to Fort Sam Houston, Texas, with the potential of transitioning to a tri-service education and training effort. Consolidation is expected to result in government savings and makes the campus the largest enlisted military medical education and training facility in the world.

== Construction ==
METC's footprint covers more than one million square feet on Fort Sam Houston and cost more than $1 billion to build and equip. Eleven new facilities have been built, including three 1,200-student dormitories, and five existing buildings were renovated/transitioned to accommodate METC students. Construction began July 21, 2008. Three dormitories were built to accommodate Air Force and Navy students. Other facilities include a dining facility, fitness center, five new medical instructional facilities (MIFs), a biomedical equipment technician field training site, a Navy and Air Force shared command building, student activity center, academic support facility, and a METC headquarters building. Two other dorms were built nearby for Army students, with one housing technical school students. The dorm rooms themselves were individually constructed offsite at a plant in Belton, Texas, and shipped. Each of the five, 4-story dormitories cost approximately $140 million to complete. The dormitories consist of 600 apartment-styled dorms on three upper floors while the bottom floor are classrooms and administrative spaces. Due to the unique circumstances of a military dormitory over traditional college dorms (such as noise from aircraft, armored vehicles, and artillery, as well as the Army's policies on the amount of floor space allocated per soldier), contractors were forced to find a unique way to deal with the sound. The traditional method of party walls would not work because of the already limited floor space. A new soundproof drywall was used instead to give students as much living space as possible.

== Academics ==
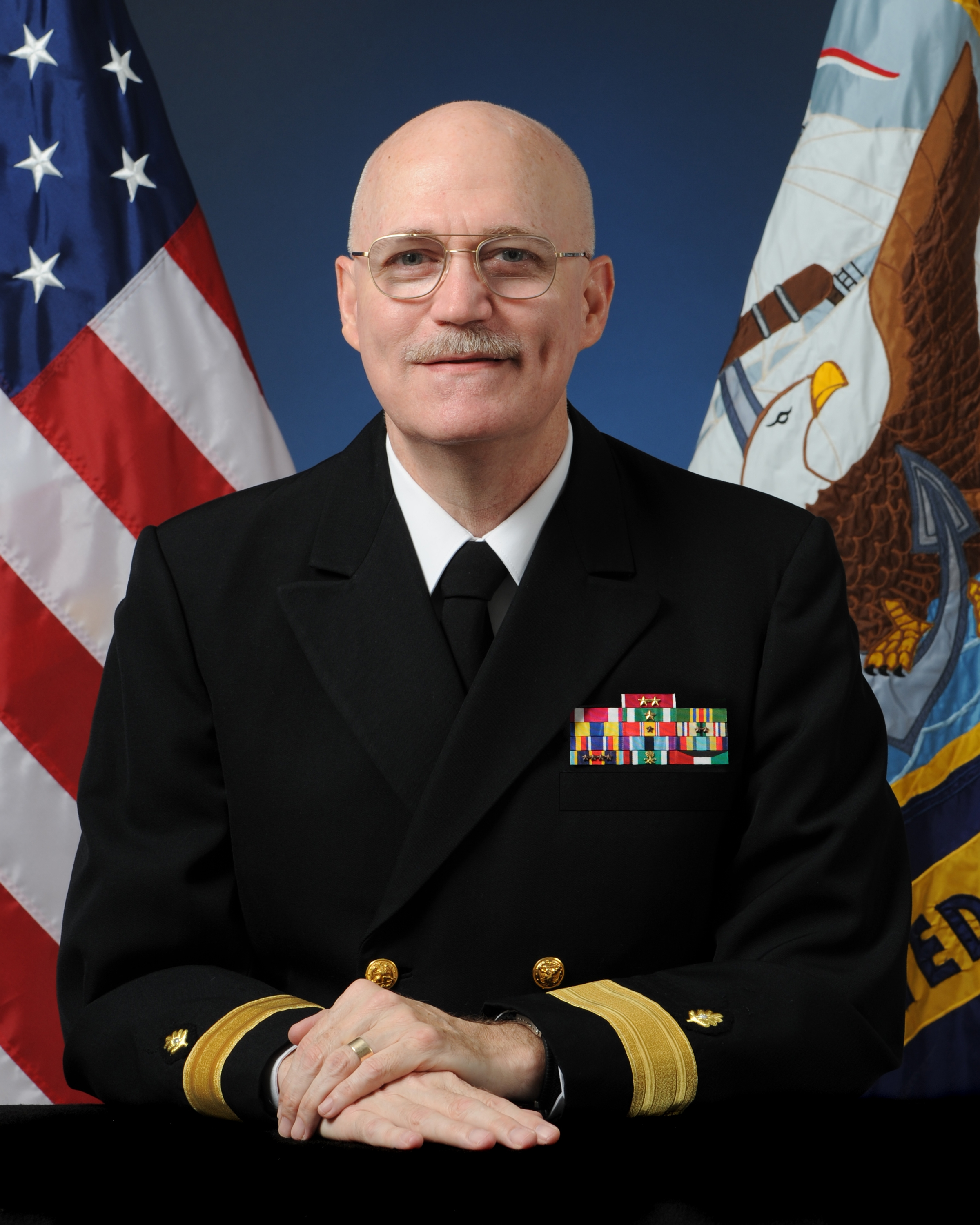
Founding Commandant Rear Admiral Kiser USN, (RET)

METC entered into its initial operating capability June 30, 2010 and reached full operating capability on September 15, 2011. Its initial training course was Radiology Technician. Their courses were phased in throughout the rest of the year and into 2011. The METC campus graduates around 16,500 students each year, with an average daily student load of approximately 5,500. METC officials will also employ an operating staff and faculty of 1,200.

On August 10, 2014, METC came under the control of the Education and Training Directorate of the newly established Defense Health Agency and reached initial operational capability.

In 2016, the 937th Training Group of the 37th Training Wing, the Air Force component of the Medical Education and Training Campus, was replaced by the 59th Training Group, part of the 59th Medical Wing.

By service, the student breakdown includes approximately 51 percent Army, 31 percent Navy and 18 percent Air Force. The longest program offered is cytology, which is the study of cells, at 52 weeks; and the shortest, at four weeks, is patient administration. Consolidated basic and specialty enlisted training from five separate service medical learning centers have moved to San Antonio, Texas.

== Local impact ==
The Medical Education and Training Campus has already brought $621 million to San Antonio and is estimated to bring an additional $15 billion per year after 2011.

== See also ==
- Army Medical Department Center & School
- Naval Hospital Corps School
