= 32nd Medical Brigade =

32d Medical Brigade
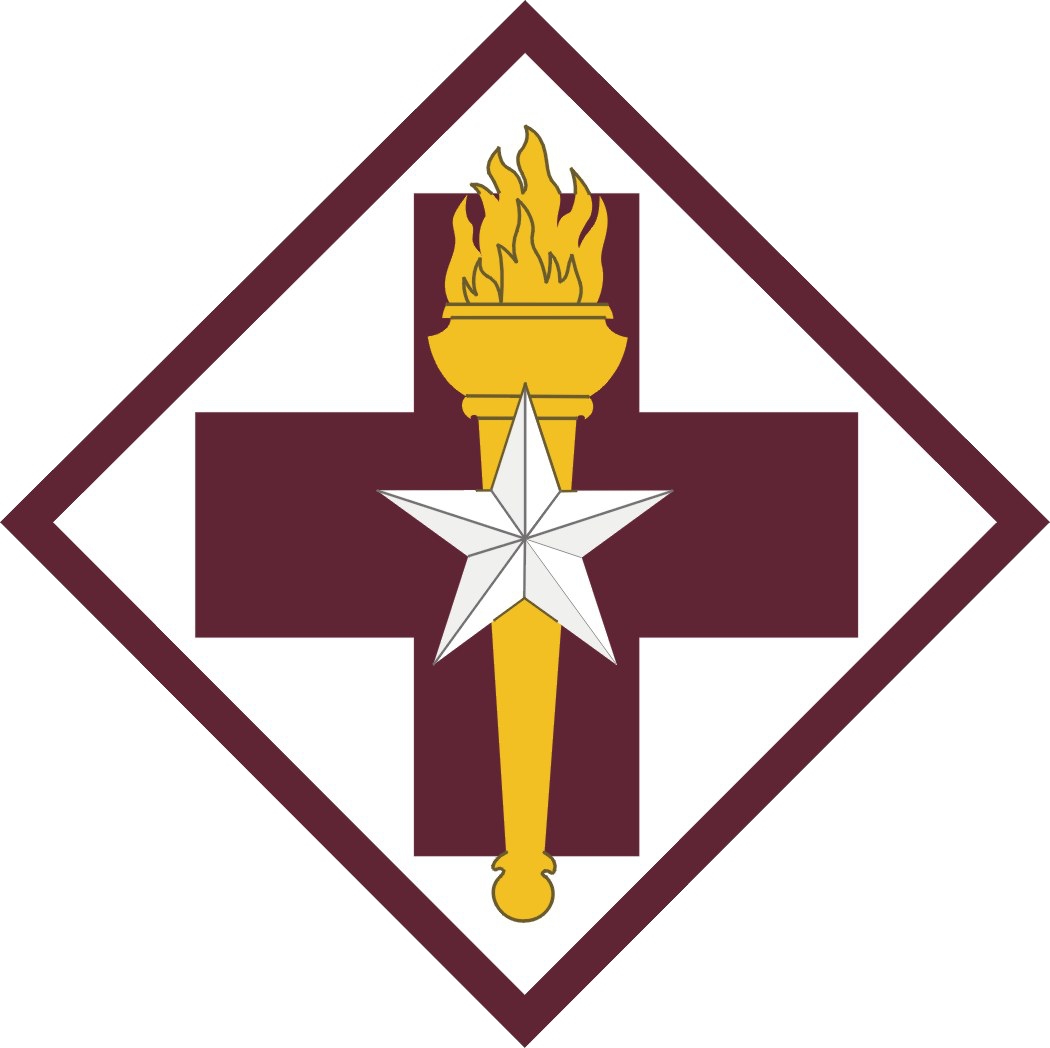
- 32d Medical Brigade's Shoulder Sleeve Insignia
- Active: 1940 - present
- Country: United States
- Branch: United States Army
- Type: Medical
- Role: Medical Training
- Size: Brigade
- Part of: United States Army Medical Department Center and School
- Garrison/HQ: Fort Sam Houston, TX
- Motto: Excellence in Action
- Website: 32d Medical Brigade

Commanders
- Commander: COL Manuel Menéndez
- Command Sergeant Major: CSM Angela Bowley

Insignia
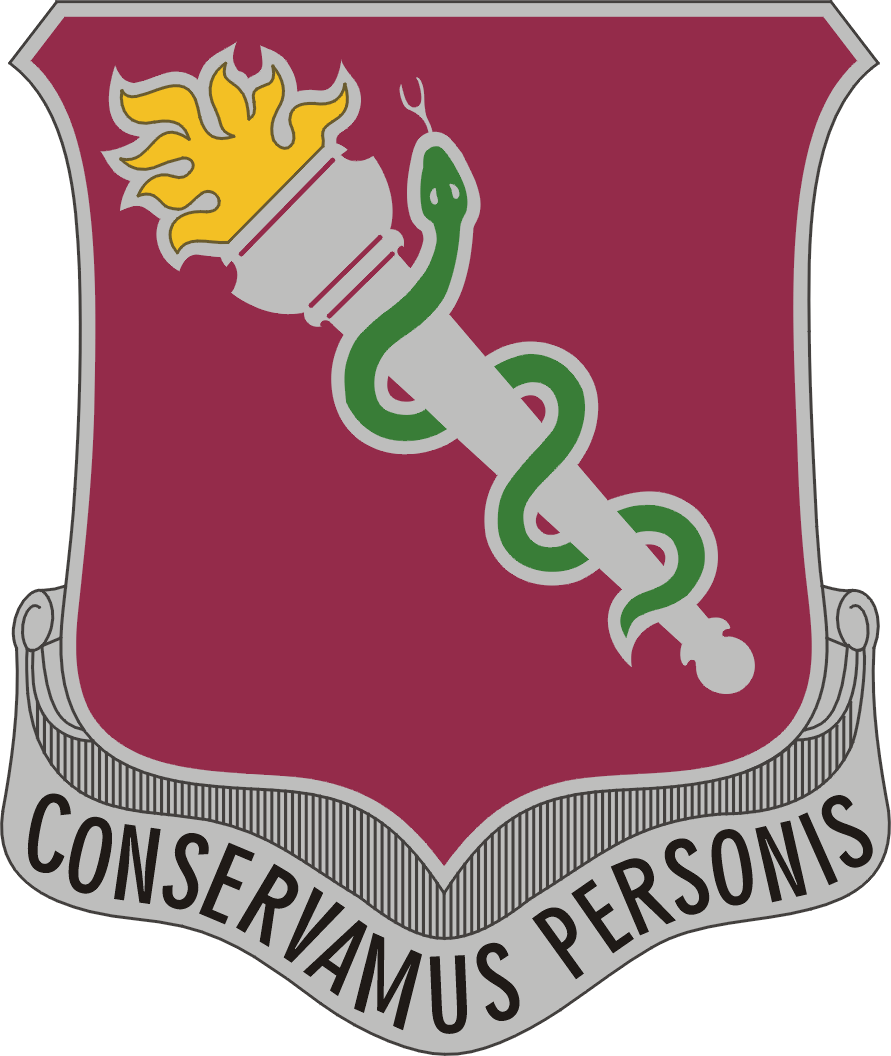
- 32nd Medical Brigade DUI

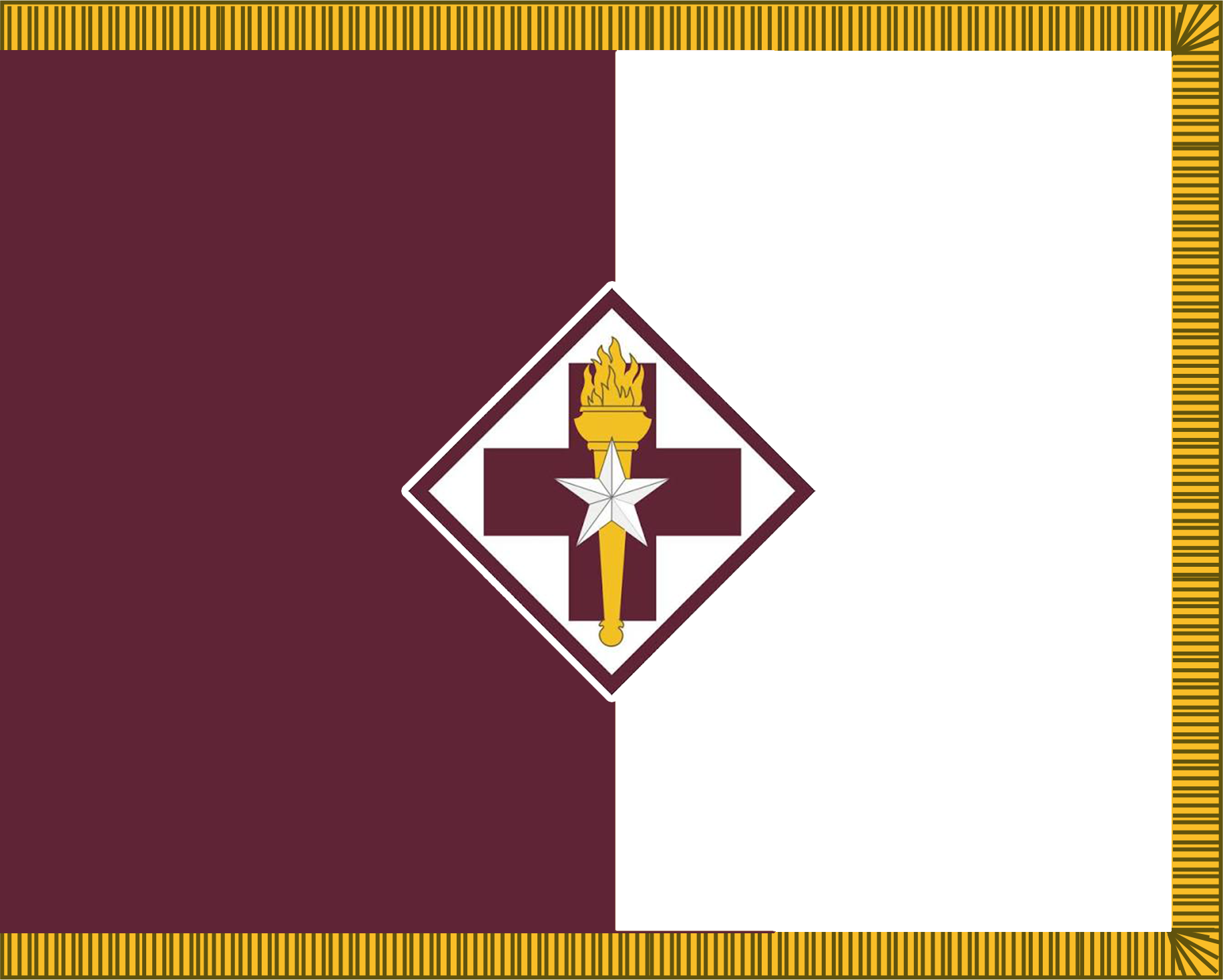
- 32nd Medical Brigade Flag

The 32d Medical Brigade is a medical brigade in the United States Army formed in 1940. The unit is a part of the U.S. Army Medical Center of Excellence (MEDCoE).

== Structure ==
The following units are subordinate to the brigade:

- 187th Medical Battalion
- 188th Medical Battalion
- 232d Medical Battalion
- 264th Medical Battalion
- US Army Element at Defense Language Institute English Language Center (DLIELC)

== Lineage ==
Organized 1 June 1940 in the Regular Army at Carlisle Barracks, Pennsylvania, as Provisional Medical Battalion, The Medical Field Service School

Consolidated 11 August 1940 with the 32d Medical Battalion (concurrently constituted in the Regular Army), and consolidated unit designated as the 32d Medical Battalion

Inactivated 30 April 1948 at Fort Sam Houston, Texas

Redesignated 19 August 1992 as the 132d Medical Battalion

Headquarters, 132d Medical Battalion, redesignated 1 October 2002 as Headquarters and Headquarters Company, 32d Medical Brigade (remainder of the battalion disbanded); concurrently transferred to the United States Army Medical Command and activated at Fort Sam Houston, Texas

== Decorations ==
- Meritorious Unit Commendation (Army) for AMERICAN THEATER
