= 44th Medical Brigade =

- Shoulder sleeve insignia
- Active: 30 December 1965 – 19 March 1973; 21 September 1974 – present
- Country: United States
- Branch: United States Army
- Type: Medical
- Size: Brigade
- Part of: XVIII Airborne Corps
- Garrison/HQ: Fort Bragg
- Nickname: Dragon Medics
- Engagements: Vietnam War; Operation Urgent Fury; Operation Just Cause; Operation Desert Storm; Operation Enduring Freedom; Operation Iraqi Freedom
- Decorations: Meritorious Unit Commendation

Commanders
- Current commander: COL Caryn Vernon
- Notable commanders: BG Hal B. Jennings BG Spurgeon Neel; BG James B. Peake BG George Weightman

Insignia
- Distinctive unit insignia

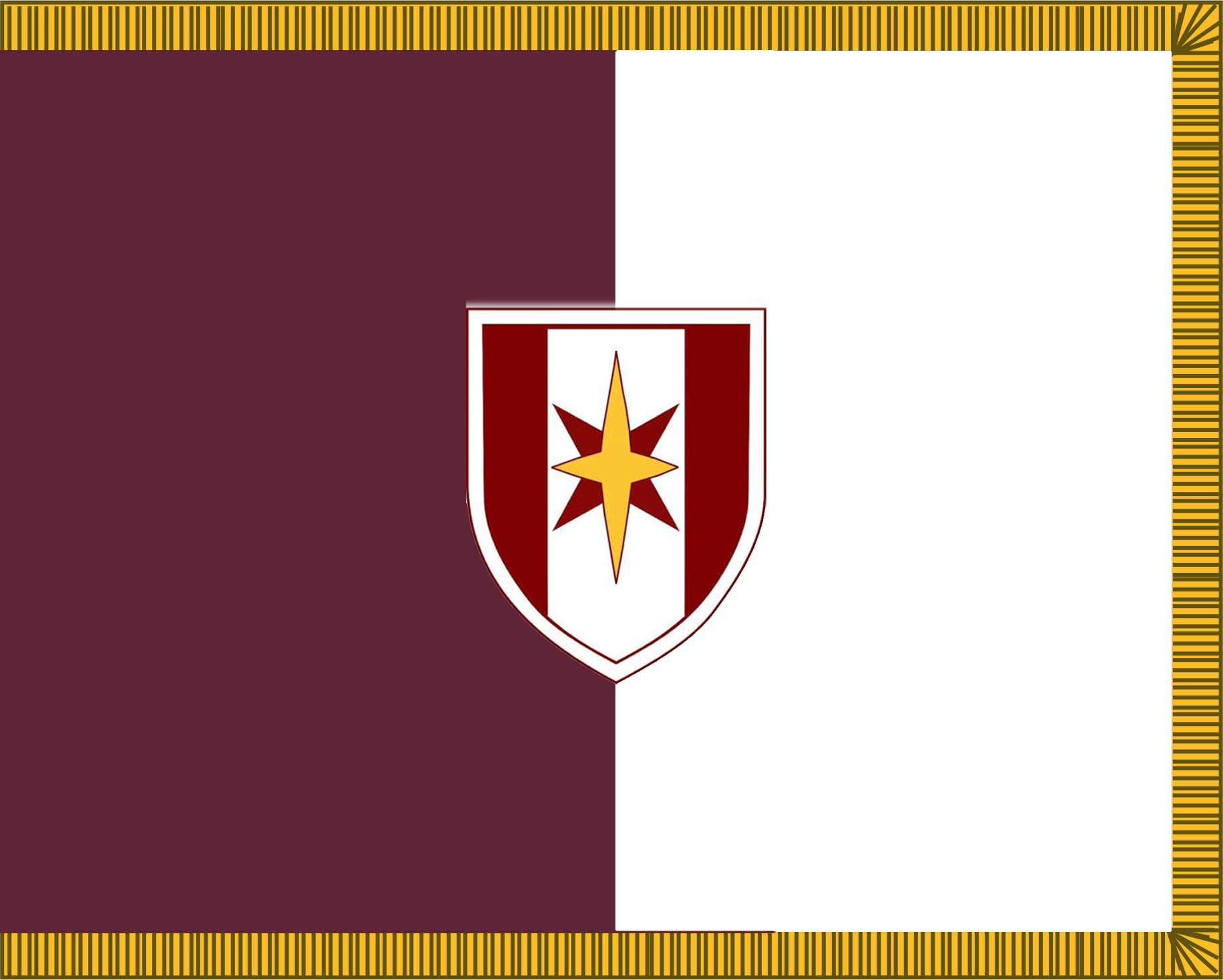
- 44th Medical Brigade Flag

The 44th Medical Brigade is a US Army unit located at Fort Bragg, North Carolina, providing health care and medical services to the Fort Bragg community, and continuing training in its combat support mission. It was the US Army's second operational medical brigade and, when deployed to the Republic of Vietnam in 1966, the first to support ground combat operations. It has since participated in every major ground combat operation of the United States Army.

== Command group ==
- Commander: COL Caryn Vernon
- Command Sergeant Major: CSM Scott Dinse

== Lineage and key dates ==
- Constituted 30 December 1965 in the Regular Army as Headquarters and Headquarters Detachment, 44th Medical Brigade.
- Activated 1 January 1966 at Fort Sam Houston, Texas
- Advance Party arrived in Vietnam on 18 March 1966, and was located in Saigon, Republic of Vietnam.
- Brigade became operational on 1 May 1966 in Saigon, Republic of Vietnam..
- Brigade headquarters relocated to Long Binh Post, Republic of Vietnam in September 1967.
- 44th Medical Brigade was consolidated with the United States Army, Vietnam Surgeon's Office to form the US Army Medical Command, Vietnam (Provisional) on 1 March 1970 at Long Binh Post, Republic of Vietnam and reduced to zero strength.
- 44th Medical Brigade colors redeployed to Fort George G. Meade, Maryland, 14 December 1970; 18th Medical Brigade reflagged as 44th Medical Brigade.
- Inactivated 18 March 1973 at Fort George G. Meade, Maryland.
- Activated 21 September 1974 at Fort Bragg, North Carolina.
- Redesignated 21 June 1976 as Headquarters and Headquarters Company, 44th Medical Brigade.
- Reorganized and redesignated as Headquarters and Headquarters Company, 44th Medical Command on 16 October 2001 at Fort Bragg, North Carolina.
- Reorganized and redesignated as Headquarters and Headquarters Company, 44th Medical Brigade on 24 April 2010 at Fort Bragg, North Carolina.

== Honors ==
=== Campaign participation credit ===
- Vietnam:
1. Counteroffensive;
2. Counteroffensive, Phase II;
3. Counteroffensive, Phase III;
4. Tet Counteroffensive;
5. Counteroffensive, Phase IV;
6. Counteroffensive, Phase V;
7. Counteroffensive, Phase VI;
8. Tet 69/Counteroffensive;
9. Summer-Fall 1969;
10. Winter-Spring 1970;
11. Sanctuary Counteroffensive;
12. Counteroffensive, Phase VII
- Southwest Asia:
1. Defense of Saudi Arabia;
2. Liberation and Defense of Kuwait

=== Decorations ===
- Meritorious Unit Commendation (Army) for:
1. Vietnam 1968–1969
2. Vietnam 1969–1970
3. Southwest Asia 1990-1991
4. Iraq 2004-2005
5. Iraq 2008-2009
- Republic of Vietnam Civil Action Honor Medal, First Class for:
1. Vietnam 1969–1970

== History ==
=== Vietnam War ===
==== 1966 ====
===== Activation and deployment activities =====
Headquarters and Headquarters Detachment, 44th Medical Brigade was constituted in the Regular Army on 30 December 1965 and activated at Fort Sam Houston, Texas on 1 January 1966 for future service in Vietnam. The unit was organized under Table of Organization and Equipment (TOE) 8-112E, with an authorized strength of 20 officers and 47 enlisted.

1st Lieutenant Byron L. Evans, a Medical Service Corps (MSC) officer, was the first officer to report to the 44th's headquarters at Fort Sam Houston and assumed command on 7 January 1966. On 25 January, Lieutenant Colonel John W. Hammett, MSC, assumed command. He was succeeded by Colonel Thomas P. Caito, MSC, on 7 February. In Vietnam, Colonel (later Brigadier General) James A. Wier, a Medical Corps (MC) officer, was assigned as Director of Medical Services, 1st Logistical Command on 26 January, and was designated as the Commanding Officer of the 44th Medical Brigade, to join the unit in-country.

Orders for the April movement of the Brigade Headquarters from Fort Sam Houston were issued on 31 January. The unit would be assigned to the United States Army, Pacific upon debarkation. Readiness dates were set at 1 April for equipment and 21 April for personnel.

Personnel for the brigade headquarters reported to Fort Sam Houston throughout January and February. Preparation for overseas movement training was conducted in cooperation with the 67th Medical Group and the United States Army Medical Training Center, Fort Sam Houston-an organization separate and distinct from the Medical Field Service School that was charged with initial entry training of combat medics. The Fort Sam Houston Post Headquarters provided logistical assistance to the 44th to help meet the equipment readiness date. Other activities at Fort Sam Houston included the preparation of Standing Operating Procedures; assembly and packing of supplies, equipment, and administrative and professional references; and arranging transportation.

On 18 March, an advance party from the 44th Medical Brigade, composed of 8 officers and 10 enlisted arrived in Vietnam to establish the Medical Brigade (Provisional), which became a working unit of the Medical Directorate of the 1st Logistical Command. Colonel Caito commanded the advance party en route while Colonel Herbert R. Faust, Veterinary Corps (VC), Staff Veterinarian, remained in Texas to command the main body. On 24 March Colonel Wier assumed command of the Medical Brigade (Provisional) and Colonel Caito became the executive officer.

The main body of the 44th touched down at Tan Son Nhut Airport on 21 April 1966. The Medical Brigade (Provisional) was immediately discontinued while the Headquarters and Headquarters Detachment of the 44th Medical Brigade established its offices and billets at 24/8 Truong Quoc Dung, a group of rented villas in suburban Saigon. The Brigade Headquarters, assigned to the 1st Logistical Command, became operational on 1 May and assumed command and operational control of all medical units assigned to the 1st Logistical Command.

===== Mission and organization =====
When the advance party of the 44th arrived in Vietnam in March to establish the Medical Brigade (Provisional), the 1st Logistical Command had command and control of those medical units in country which were not organic to divisions, separate brigades, or similar units. The 43d and 68th Medical Groups were the principal subordinate medical commands within the 1st Logistical Command.

The Medical Directorate, 1st Logistical Command, was staffed to develop, coordinate, and supervise medical plans and operations, medical supply and maintenance policies, medical statistics and records, professional medical and dental activities, preventive medicine, and medical regulating activities.

The Medical Brigade (Provisional) served as a vehicle of transition in transferring the direct command and control of medical support units from the 1st Logistical Command to the 44th Medical Brigade. Colonel Wier continued to direct his staff in the Logistical Command's Medical Directorate while also serving as Brigade Commander.

The mission of the Headquarters, Medical Brigade (Provisional) was to "Provide medical service to the United States Army, Vietnam (USARV) through command and control of operating units of the 1st Logistical Command medical service system; developing; [sic] refine and implement operations; reinforce the medical service of the Army divisions, separate brigades and other units having organic medical support, as required; provide staff and technical supervision over religious activities of assigned and attached units; and perform the overall medical service support operations which include patient evacuation, care and treatment; medical supply and maintenance; and the dental, veterinary, preventive medicine and laboratory services."

The Brigade Commander was to "Direct the medical service of the 1st Logistical Command and as the Medical Director, 1st Logistical Command is responsible to the Commanding General, 1st Logistical Command for the accomplishment of the overall medical service mission."

During the time that the Provisional Brigade was functioning, some of the personnel of the Logistical Command's Medical Directorate were transferred to the Brigade Headquarters; others were transferred elsewhere; and some rotated, so that when the 44th became operational, the only personnel left in the Medical Directorate other than Colonel Wier was a Field Army Support Command (FASCOM) Staff Medical Section, consisting of two plans officers, a supply and maintenance officer, a chief medical non-commissioned officer, a typist and a driver.

The Medical Directorate was physically located at Headquarters, 1st Logistical Command throughout the period, but on 1 October 1966 all functions of the section were absorbed by staff sections of the 44th, and the office at the Logistical Headquarters was retained for liaison purposes only. The supply officer continued working in the Brigade S-4, the assistant plans officer became the S-3 of the 43d Medical Group, while the plans officer, the medical NCO, the typist, and the driver remained at the Logistical Command for liaison.

After the 44th Medical Brigade became operational on 1 May, the mission remained essentially the same as it had been for the Medical Brigade (Provisional). A more detailed account of the mission stated that the Commanding Officer, 44th Medical Brigade, in support of USARV elements, would:

1. Provide area medical support to units without an assigned organic medical support capability
2. Provide dental service on an area basis
3. Provide a system of hospitalization and evacuation
4. Supervise professional medical services of subordinate units
5. Exercise custody of medical records and render reports on patients treated
6. Collect, evaluate, interpret, and consolidate required medical statistical data from assigned or attached units and submit to this headquarters, as required.
7. Provide technical inspection and maintenance support of medical equipment and supplies
8. Provide medical supply for US Forces and for designated Free World Military Assistance Forces as directed by the 1st Logistical Command
9. Provide veterinary food inspection and animal veterinary service
10. Provide preventive maintenance support
11. Provide medical laboratory support
12. Provide medical equipment maintenance and repair facilitation
13. Support the medical equipment status reporting system
14. Provide for medical regulation of patients intra-army or as directed by 1st Logistical Command
15. Provide for the security of personnel, equipment, facilities, and billets of elements of the 1st Logistical Command assigned or attached to the Brigade

The Brigade Commander retained his other role as Medical Director, 1st Logistical Command. The staff organization of the Brigade continued to function along similar lines, though with expanded activities and responsibilities.

Colonel Wier became USARV Surgeon on 10 June 1966. On 13 June 1966 a change of command ceremony was held within the 44th Medical Brigade compound where Colonel Wier turned command of the Brigade over to Colonel Ray L. Miller, MC.

Major Stuart A. Chamblin, Jr., MC, served as Deputy Commander of the Provisional Brigade during the time of its existence. He rotated to the United States in early May and the position remained vacant until 6 June, when Lieutenant Colonel Lewis VanOsdel, MC, became Deputy. After he rotated on 12 September the position remained vacant until Lieutenant Colonel Robert E. Miller filled the position on 14 November 1966.

There were 58 medical units in the 1st Logistical Command on 1 January 1966, and 65 under the 44th Medical Brigade when it became operational on 1 May. On 31 December 1966 the Brigade had command and control of 121 units. The veterinary, dental, medical laboratory, and preventive medicine units, the medical depot, and the medical group headquarters were organized directly under the Brigade Headquarters, while the remaining units were organized under the medical groups by geographic area. The overall strength of the Brigade was 3,178 on 1 May 1966 and 7,830 on 31 December.

===== Units =====
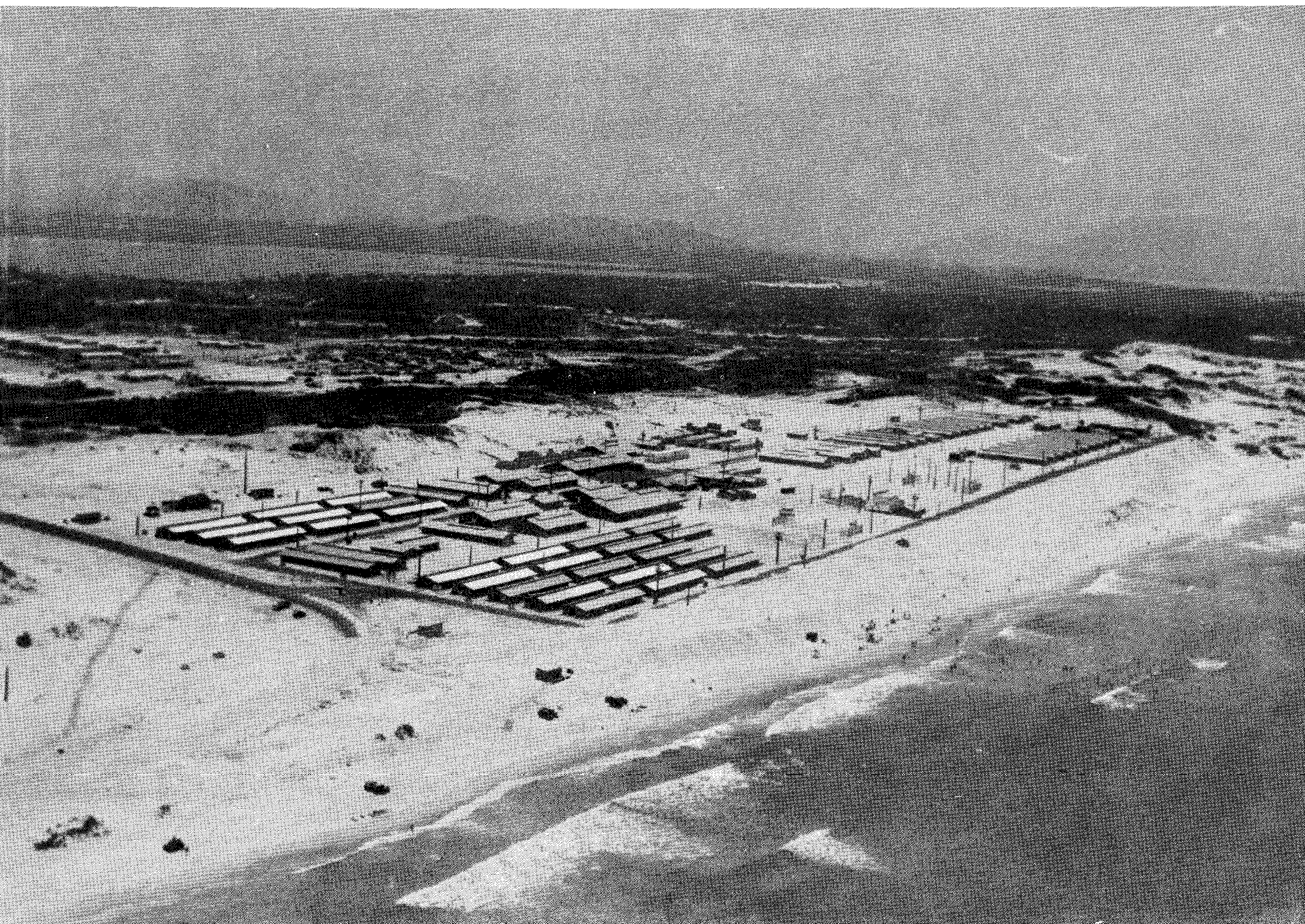
6th Convalescent Center, Cam Ranh Bay

Unit	Arrival Date	Date Operational	Location
1st Medical Company (Ambulance)	20 November 1966	3 December 1966	Pleiku
2d Medical Detachment (MA)	1 October 1964	5 December 1964	Cholon
2d Surgical Hospital	31 October 1965	5 January 1966	An Khe
3d Surgical Hospital	5 August 1965	15 September 1965	Bien Hoa
3d Field Hospital	26 April 1965	11 May 1965	Saigon
3d Medical Detachment (LA)	20 November 1966	5 December 1966	Pleiku
4th Medical Detachment (JB)	15 July 1965	July 1965	Saigon
6th Convalescent Center	15 April 1966	16 May 1966	Cam Ranh Bay
7th Surgical Hospital	4 June 1966	1 August 1966	Cu Chi
7th Medical Detachment (MA)	31 August 1966	15 September 1966	Cu Chi
8th Field Hospital	10 April 1962	April 1962	Nha Trang
9th Field Hospital	14 July 1965	20 July 1965	Nha Trang
9th Medical Laboratory	4 June 1966	1 August 1966	Saigon
12th Evacuation Hospital	9 September 1966	15 December 1966	Cu Chi
17th Field Hospital	10 March 1966	1 April 1966	Cholon
18th Surgical Hospital	18 June 1966	1 July 1966	Pleiku
20th Preventive Medicine Unit (Service) (Field)	15 July 1965	August 1965	Saigon
24th Evacuation Hospital	10 July 1966	9 January 1967	Long Binh
25th Medical Detachment (MA)	2 November 1965	23 December 1965	Long Binh
27th Military History Detachment	1 September 1966	2 September 1966	Saigon
32d Medical Depot	4 October 1965	16 October 1965	Cam Ranh Bay
36th Medical Detachment (KJ)	April 1965	April 1965	Saigon
36th Evacuation Hospital	7 March 1966	30 March 1966	Vung Tau
38th Medical Detachment (KJ)	4 June 1966	15 July 1966	Long Binh
39th Medical Detachment (KJ)	4 June 1966	21 July 1966	Pleiku
40th Medical Detachment (KJ)	6 May 1966	1 June 1966	Cu Chi
43d Medical Group	20 September 1965	1 November 1965	Nha Trang
45th Surgical Hospital	15 September 1966	13 November 1966	Tay Ninh
45th Medical Detachment (KB)	10 July 1966	1 August 1966	Cu Chi
46th Medical Detachment (KB)	6 November 1965	10 November 1966	Long Binh
48th Medical Detachment (KA)	23 August 1965	14 September 1965	An Khe
50th Medical Company (Clearing)	4 June 1966	24 October 1966	Long Binh
51st Medical Company (Ambulance)	7 November 1966	25 December 1965	Phu Thanh
53d Medical Detachment (KA)	18 May 1966	23 May 1966	Long Binh
55th Medical Group	11 June 1966	1 July 1966	Qui Nhon
56th Medical Detachment (KJ)	4 September 1965	20 September 1965	An Khe
57th Medical Detachment (RA)	16 April 1962	April 1962	Tan Son Nhut
58th Medical Battalion	27 May 1965	15 July 1965	Long Binh
61st Medical Battalion	8 June 1966	15 June 1966	Cam Ranh Bay
61st Medical Detachment (LB)*	13 July 1965	15 July 1965	Saigon
61st Medical Detachment (MB)*	23 June 1966	28 June 1966	Long Binh
62d Medical Detachment (KA)	28 November 1965	2 December 1965	Saigon
67th Evacuation Hospital	7 March 1966	5 October 1966	Qui Nhon
67th Medical Detachment (KF)	31 July 1966	31 July 1966	Nha Trang
68th Medical Group	7 February 1966	1 March 1966	Long Binh
70th Medical Battalion	7 November 1965	7 November 1965	Phu Than
71st Evacuation Hospital	15 November 1966		Pleiku
74th Medical Battalion	4 June 1966	5 July 1966	Long Binh
75th Medical Detachment (JA)	7 September 1965	13 October 1965	Na Trang
82d Medical Detachment (RA)	17 October 1964	November 1964	Soc Trang
84th Medical Detachment (OA)	30 November 1966	28 December 1966	Long Binh
85th Evacuation Hospital	31 August 1965	6 September 1965	Qui Nhon
91st Evacuation Hospital	3 December		Tuy Hoa
93d Evacuation Hospital	4 November 1965	10 December 1965	Long Binh
98th Medical Detachment (KO)	4 June 1966	11 July 1966	Nha Trang
104th Medical Detachment (KD)	24 June 1966	28 June 1966	Saigon
105th Medical Detachment (LA)	28 November 1966	15 December 1966	Cam Ranh Bay
126th Medical Detachment (OA)	7 November 1966	19 December 1966	Nha Trang
128th Medical Detachment (OA)	2 November 1966	4 December 1966	Dalat
133d Medical Detachment (OA)	28 November 1966	8 December 1966	Long Binh
136th Medical Detachment (MA)	24 August 1965	1 October 1965	Cam Ranh Bay
137th Medical Detachment (KJ)	13 July 1965	20 July 1965	Saigon
138th Medical Detachment (KE)	30 July 1966	30 July 1966	Pleiku
139th Medical Detachment (KB)	30 July 1966	30 July 1966	Qui Nhon
142d Medical Detachment (MA)	4 September 1965	10 December 1965	Phu Than
151st Medical Detachment (KI)	29 May 1965	20 June 1965	Vung Tau
152d Medical Detachment (MA)	23 August 1965	8 November 1965	Qui Nhon
155th Medical Detachment (KF)	4 November 1965	6 November 1965	Saigon
161st Medical Detachment (OA)	28 May 1965	3 June 1965	Cam Ranh Bay
202d Medical Detachment (MA)	21 August 1965	14 September 1965	Saigon
221st Medical Detachment (MB)	31 July 1966	9 August 1966	Phan Rang
229th Medical Detachment (MC)	8 September 1966	17 October 1966	Long Binh
240th Medical Detachment (KF)	30 July 1966	30 July 1966	Pleiku
241st Medical Detachment (MB)	31 July 1966	9 August 1966	Cam Ranh Bay
254th Medical Detachment (RA)	23 October 1965	1 February 1966	Long Binh
257th Medical Detachment (KJ)	4 November 1965	28 November 1965	Di An
275th Medical Detachment (FB)	6 September 1965	29 September 1965	Qui Nhon
283d Medical Detachment (RA)	1 September 1965	1 October 1965	Long Binh
332d Medical Detachment (MB)	4 June 1966	25 August 1966	Long Binh
345th Medical Detachment (MA)	26 April 1965	5 May 1965	Vung Tau
346th Medical Detachment (MA)	4 June 1966	25 August 1966	Long Binh
349th Medical Detachment (MB)	21 June 1966	25 August 1966	Cam Ranh Bay
406th Medical Laboratory	14 September 1963	24 September 1964	Nha Trang
418th Medical Company (Ambulance)	21 June 1966	1 July 1966	Cam Ranh Bay
435th Medical Detachment (KA)	23 May 1966	23 May 1966	Nha Trang
436th Medical Detachment (AC)	1 September 1966	15 September 1966	Long Binh
438th Medical Detachment (RB)	15 September 1966	3 October 1966	Qui Nhon
439th Medical Detachment (RB)	1 September 1966	24 October 1966	Long Binh
440th Medical Detachment (RB)	15 September 1966	1 October 1966	Cam Ranh Bay
463d Medical Detachment (KH)	23 August 1965	14 September 1965	An Khe
495th Medical Detachment (AC)	29 August 1966	1 September 1966	Qui Nhon
498th Medical Company (Air Ambulance)	7 September 1965	20 September 1965	Nha Trang
501st Medical Detachment (MA)	29 August 1966	12 October 1966	Pleiku
504th Medical Detachment (IE)	21 October 1966	30 October 1966	Da Nang
516th Medical Detachment (AC)	31 August 1966	20 November 1966	Cam Ranh Bay
523d Field Hospital	23 September 1965	25 September 1965	Nha Trang
528th Medical Laboratory	19 September 1965	20 October 1965	Qui Nhon
541st Medical Detachment (MA)	4 June 1966	13 July 1966	Long Binh
542d Medical Company (Clearing)	27 August 1965	14 September 1965	Phu Thanh
544th Medical Detachment (FC)	14 July 1965	28 July 1965	Nha Trang
561st Medical Company (Ambulance)	6 September 1965	7 September 1965	Long Binh
563d Medical Company (Clearing)	16 September 1966	1 November 1966	Tuy Hoa
568th Medical Company (Clearing)	11 January 1966	30 January 1966	Nha Trang
575th Medical Detachment (MB)	6 April 1966	14 April 1966	Nha Trang
584th Medical Company (Ambulance)	15 October 1966	16 November 1966	Long Binh
616th Medical Company (Clearing)	4 November 1965	28 December 1965	Long Binh
629th Medical Detachment (KP)	3 June 1966	6 June 1966	Saigon
673d Medical Detachment (OA)	1 November 1965	12 November 1965	Saigon
872d Medical Detachment (RB)	8 September 1966		Vung Tau
874th Medical Detachment (RB)	31 October 1966	1 November 1966	Nha Trang
915th Medical Detachment (KH)	4 November 1966	6 November 1966	Saigon
926th Medical Detachment (LB)	22 October 1966	26 December 1966	Qui Nhon
933d Medical Detachment (KE)	14 April 1966	14 April 1966	Nha Trang
934th Medical Detachment (KJ)	23 December 1965	8 January 1966	Nha Trang
935th Medical Detachment (KO)	23 December 1965	26 December 1965	Long Binh
936th Medical Detachment (ID)	23 December 1965	15 January 1966	Tan Son Nhut
945th Medical Detachment (KA)	14 November 1965	12 December 1965	Long Binh
946th Medical Laboratory	14 December 1965	10 February 1966	Long Binh

-*The 61st Medical Detachment (LB) was a preventive medicine detachment, and the 61st Medical Detachment (MB) was a large dispensary. They were two separate and distinct organizations with the same numerical designation, but separate Unit Identification Codes (UICs).

Personnel Status as of 31 December 1966

		Authorized	Assigned
Officers		1,729	1,459
	Medical Corps	547	480
	Medical Service Corps	362	351
	Dental Corps	168	153
	Veterinary Corps	19	20
	Army Nurse Corps	612	435
	Chaplain Corps	21	15
	Other	0	5
Warrant Officers		66	50
Enlisted		5,358	6,321
TOTAL		7,153	7,830

===== Air ambulance support =====
The medical air ambulance helicopter in Vietnam supported combat operations and gave general area medical support for all forces in-country. The secondary mission included delivery of emergency whole blood and medical supplies as well as airliftincg keoy medical personnel (i.e., surgical teams, etc.).

Combat operations were supported by placing one or more air ambulances and ground ambulance support in direct support of the combat troops. The aircraft picked up the wounded, not at an aid station, but at the point of injury. On average the wounded were in a hospital or being treated by a surcical team at a clearing station within thirty minutes. All combat wounded were evacuated by air at least once before being air evacuated out of country.

Aeromedical Evacuation Statistics 1966

Month	Missions Flown	Patients Evacuated
January	1,873	3,054
February	1,791	4,096
March	1,695	4,209
April	2,780	5,025
May	2,975	5,103
June	3,062	4,674
July	3,189	4,755
August	3,081	4,688
September	3,525	4,929
October	3,322	5,357
November	3,586	7,151
December	3,601	7,163

This led to an operational shift in Vietnam, as medical mobility no longer lay with the treatment facility, but with the evacuation units. This allowed the establishment of more or less fixed medical facilities throughout the country and enabled them to install better equipment and, in turn, provide better care for their patients.

Throughout 1966, the 44th Medical Brigade operated 49 air ambulances, while another 12 were organic to the Air Ambulance Platoon, 15th Medical Battalion, 1st Cavalry Division (Airmobile). The Brigade's air ambulances were organized into two companies. One TOE Medical Company (Air Ambulance), the 498th had 25 aircraft organized into four flight platoons. The second air ambulance company was organized under the 436th Medical Detachment (AC) as company headquarters with four medical detachments (RA) operating under it, variously referred to as the 436th Medical Company (Air Ambulance) or the Air Ambulance Company (Provisional). The 498th had responsibility for air ambulance support of II Corps Tactical Zone and the 436th had responsibility for supporting III and IV Corps Tactical Zones.

In September 1966 air ambulance units received their first in-country shipment of helicopter hoists. These hoists were used to extract patients from inaccessible areas where helicopters could not land, such as deep woods or jungle, mountainsides, water, or small boats.

===== Medical regulating =====
The mission of regulating patients from forward areas to hospitals capable of providing definitive care (Forward Aeromedical Evacuation System) became a responsibility of medical groups for the first time after the Brigade became operational. This resulted in the 44th Medical Brigade Medical Regulating Officer (MRO) becoming responsible for overall in-country evacuation. The unusual aspect of this situation was that the Republic of Vietnam (RVN) represented the entire forward area. Medical groups controlled the movement of patients (intra-area) from tactical areas to hospitals in their group. Further movement of patients from one group area to another was coordinated by medical group MROs with the brigade MRO, who maintained overall control in order to ensure proper utilization of all medical facilities. Throughout these transfers, patients never leave the forward area, while in previous conflicts they would move from the forward area to the rear area of the field army. The Tactical Aeromedical Evacuation System began with the transfer of patients from the combat zone (the RVN) to the United States Pacific Command (PACOM) and the Strategic Aeromedical Evacuation System began with the movement of patients from PACOM hospital facilities to those in the Continental United States (CONUS). The latter two phases were directly controlled by the Air Force, which was responsible for aeromedical evacuation. A Far East Joint Medical Regulating Office (FEJMRO) a tri-service organization, maintained the responsibility for designating hospitals in PACOM and CONUS where patients could receive adequate treatment. Only those patients requiring extensive (for example burn cases, major amputations, or paraplegies) were sent to CONUS.

Hospitalization Statistics for 1966

Month	Operational Beds	Beds Occupied	Admissions IRHA	Admissions DNBI	Evac Out of RVN	Returned to Duty
January	1,742	1,112	972	1,734	832	3,281
February	1,775	1,221	1,146	1,660	1,330	3,281
March	1,785	1,154	905	2,006	1,062	3,549
April	2,112	1,379	739	3,397	853	5,086
May	2,694	1,586	1,395	3,135	1,298	5,226
June	3,061	1,874	1,448	3,856	1,256	5,976
July	3,276	1,977	928	4,450	766	6,208
August	3,488	2,097	1,245	4,064	957	6,885
September	3,948	2,381	1,060	5,110	942	6,996
October	4,326	2,730	1,062	5,610	983	7,833
November	4,418	2,820	2,237	6,444	1,331	9,380
December	4,659	2,941	1,245	7,172	996	9,608

- IRHA=Injured as a Result of Hostile Action
- DNBI=Disease and Non-Battle Injury
- Patients admitted in one month may be discharged or evacuated in a subsequent month

==== 1967 ====
===== Mission =====
The mission of the 44th Medical Brigade throughout 1967 was to provide Field Army level medical support to United States Army personnel, Free World Military Assistance Forces personnel, and other categories of personnel as directed by higher headquarters.

On 10 August 1967, the 44th Medical Brigade was detached from the 1st Logistical Command and assigned directly to Headquarters, United States Army, Vietnam. Actual function and supervision of the Brigade mission was clarified but essentially unchanged by the reassignment. Execution of the Brigade mission was specifically stated as:

The 44th Medical Brigade would:

1. Command all Army Medical Service units assigned or attached (note 1)
2. Provide personnel and administrative support to units assigned or attached
3. Provide medical support to United States Army units not having an assigned or organic medical support capability
4. Provide dental service to United States Army personnel and other United States Forces on an area basis, as required
5. Provide humanitarian type dental treatment for United States nationals, Republic of Vietnam Armed Forces and Free World Military Assistance Forces when indicated
6. Pursue an aggressive preventive dentistry program
7. Be prepared to augment division and separate brigade medical service
8. Provide a medical system of hospitalization and evacuation to support United States and Free World Military Assistance Forces and such other activities and organizations as directed by higher headquarters
9. Supervise professional medical service of subordinate units
10. Exercise custody of medical records and render reports on patients treated, as required
11. Provide technical inspection and maintenance support of medical equipment and supplies
12. Provide inventory control, receipt, storage, and issue of all medical stocks for United States Army Forces, other US military forces and agencies and for designated other Free World Military Assistance Forces as directed by higher headquarters
13. Provide medical equipment maintenance and repair facilities
14. Supervise the medical equipment status reporting system
15. Provide veterinary food inspection and animal veterinary service to United States Army Forces and such other United States Forces as directed by higher headquarters
16. Provide medical laboratory support to United States Army Forces and other United States Forces as directed
17. Provide medical regulating of patients intra-Army, or as directed by higher headquarters
18. Provide guidance on the establishment of security of personnel, equipment, facilities and billets of elements of assigned and attached units
19. Provide medical support to civilian contract agencies in accordance with contractual agreements
20. Provide medical support to Free World Military Assistance Forces, prisoners of war, and to civilian war casualties, as directed by higher headquarters
21. Inspect personnel, materiel, and training of subordinate units to evaluate unit readiness
22. Conduct civic action programs in accordance with established policies
23. Perform acting Inspector General functions of receiving and processing complaints, requests for assistance, advice or information, and for such other purposes as may be authorized by Army Regulation 20-1
24. Provide chaplain activities within the command, supervise and provide staff direction to chaplains and chaplain activities of all elements of the brigade and provide morale and welfare support
25. Conduct public information and command information programs for all assigned and attached medical units in accordance with established policies of higher headquarters
26. Provide primary preventive medicine services for organizations lacking organic medical support
27. Provide preventive medicine services beyond the capability of surgeons of subordinate USARV units or commands
28. Provide preventive medicine services to other United States Forces, Free World Military Assistance Forces and Government of Vietnam Forces as directed by higher headquarters
29. Assist in controlling or preventing epidemic disease in local civil populations as necessary to protect the health of USARV personnel or as directed by higher headquarters
- Note 1: In 1950, Congress changed the name of the Army Medical Department (AMEDD) to the Army Medical Service (AMEDS) as part of the Army Organization Act of 1950. In March 1968, at the urging of Army Surgeon General Leonard D. Heaton, then in his ninth year of service as the Surgeon General, Secretary of the Army Stanley R. Resor petitioned Congress to restore the name of the Army Medical Service to the Army Medical Department, and Congress approved the restoration of the Department's name in June 1969.

===== Relocation of brigade headquarters =====
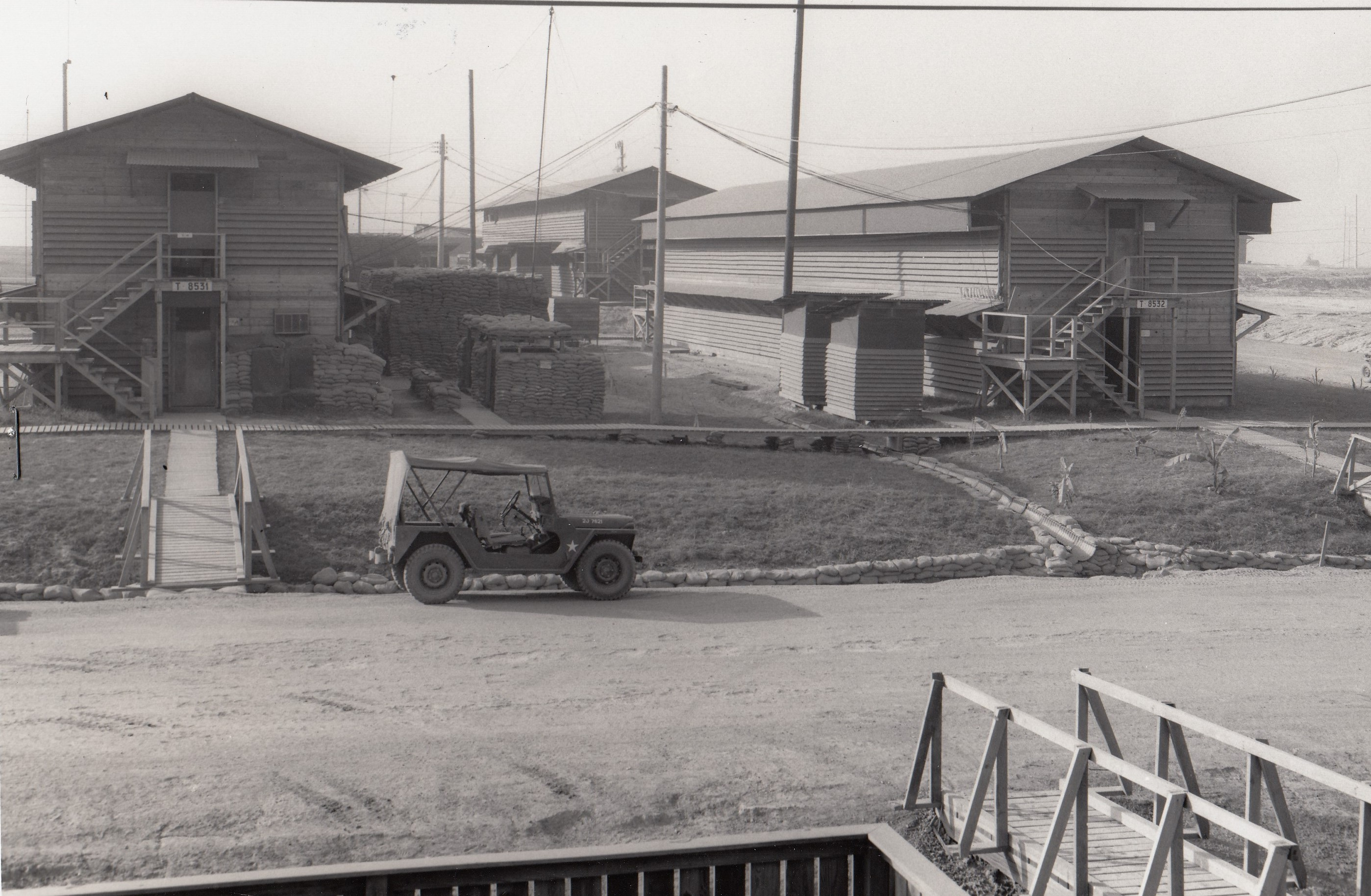
44th Medical Brigade Headquarters, 8500 Area, Long Binh Post, Republic of Vietnam, January 1968

With the increased emphasis on moving units from the Saigon-Cholon-Tan Son Nhut area, the brigade headquarters moved from its suburban villas at 24/8 Truong Quoc Dung to buildings 8528-8532 on Long Binh Post. The two-phased move was accomplished during late September 1967. Being in close geographical proximity to Headquarters USARV, and the USARV Surgeon's Office was notably beneficial in time saved and in alleviating communications problems.

===== Organization of groups and subordinate units =====
Intergroup and intragroup organization remained essentially stable until the third calendar quarter. On 23 October 1967 the 67th Medical Group became operational and medical facilities in the Saigon area, the extreme western part of III Corps Tactical Zone, and all of IV Corps Tactical Zone were detached from the 68th Medical Group and assigned to the 67th Medical Group. This divided a previously large geographical group into two groups of more workable size and resulted in more effective command and control.

This table reflects changes between 31 December 1966 and 31 December 1967

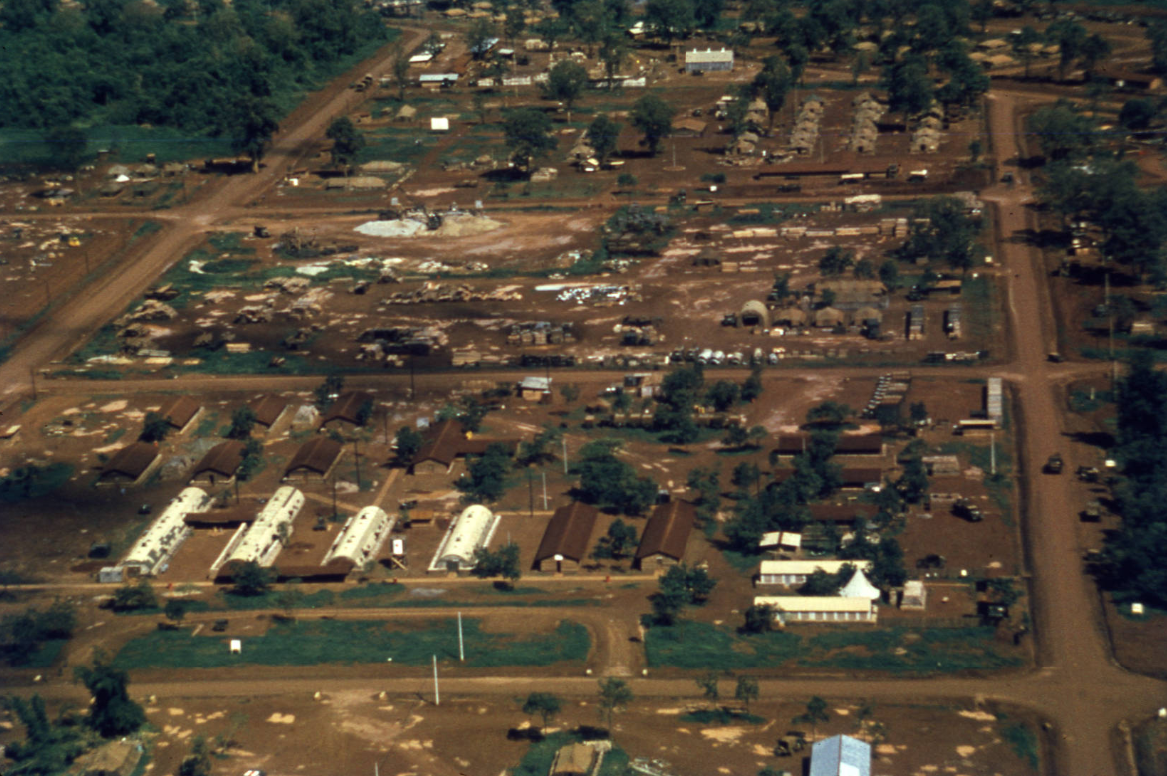
7th Surgical Hospital, Blackhorse Base Camp, 19 July 1967

Unit	Arrival Date	Date Operational	Location
2d Medical Detachment (MA)	*	*	Long Binh
2d Surgical Hospital	*	*	Chu Lai
3d Surgical Hospital	*	*	Dong Tam
4th Medical Detachment (JB)	*	*	Tan Son Nhut
7th Surgical Hospital	*	*	Long Giao
7th Medical Detachment (MA)	*	*	Cam Ranh Bay
9th Medical Laboratory	*	*	Cholon
14th Medical Detachment (MC)	20 January 1967	6 February 1967	Qui Nhon
18th Surgical Hospital	*	*	Lai Khe
20th Preventive Medicine Unit (Service) (Field)	*	*	Bien Hoa
22d Surgical Hospital	27 December 1967		Long Binh
27th Military History Detachment	*	*	Long Binh
45th Medical Company (Air Ambulance)	15 September 1967	13 November 1967	Long Binh
50th Medical Detachment (RA)	26 October 1967	11 November 1967	Phu Heip
54th Medical Detachment (RA)	23 August 1967	25 September 1967	Chu Lai
57th Medical Detachment (RA)	*	*	Long Binh
61st Medical Detachment (LB)	*	*	Dong Tam
67th Medical Group	24 September 1967	23 October 1967	Bien Hoa
71st Evacuation Hospital	*	29 May 1967	Pleiku
74th Medical Battalion	*	*	Chu Lai
75th Medical Detachment (JA)	*	*	Da Nang
84th Medical Detachment (OA)	*	*	Bien Hoa
91st Evacuation Hospital	*	15 March 1967	Phu Heip
98th Medical Detachment (KO)	*	*	Long Binh
104th Medical Detachment (KD)	*	*	Long Binh
133d Medical Detachment (OA)	*	*	Cat Lai
137th Medical Detachment (KJ)	*	*	Bear Cat
138th Medical Detachment (KE)	*	*	Qui Nhon
139th Medical Detachment (KB)	*	*	An Khe
152d Medical Detachment (MA)	*	*	Cha Rang
159th Medical Detachment (RA)	24 October 1967		Cu Chi
161st Medical Detachment (OA)	*	*	Long Binh
202d Medical Detachment (MA)	*	*	Long Binh
221st Medical Detachment (MB)	*	*	Cam Ranh Bay
222d Personnel Services Company (Type B)	17 January 1967	1 February 1967	Long Binh
229th Medical Detachment (MC)	*	*	Tan Son Nhut
254th Medical Detachment (RA)	*	*	Nha Trang
283d Medical Detachment (RA)	*	*	Pleiku
346th Medical Detachment (MA)	*	*	Can Tho
435th Medical Detachment (KA)	*	*	An Khe
437th Medical Detachment (KJ)	16 May 1967	22 May 1967	Cam Ranh Bay
440th Medical Detachment (RB)	*	*	Phu Heip
498th Medical Company (Air Ambulance)	*	*	Qui Nhon
498th Medical Detachment (RB)	2 February 1967	29 May 1967	Long Binh
500th Medical Detachment (RB)	21 February 1967	21 March 1967	Long Binh
507th Medical Detachment (FC)	24 September 1967	26 September 1967	Chu Lai
518th Medical Detachment (KJ)	10 July 1967	18 July 1967	Qui Nhon
551st Medical Detachment (KH)	14 April 1967	16 April 1967	Nha Trang
563d Medical Company (Clearing)	*	*	Chu Lai
568th Medical Company (Clearing)	*	*	Cam Ranh Bay
571st Medical Detachment (RA)	21 November 1967	4 December 1967	Nha Trang
616th Medical Company (Clearing)	*	*	An Khe
658th Medical Detachment (AC)	6 September 1966	15 September 1966	Long Binh
667th Medical Detachment (AC)	29 August 1966	1 September 1966	Bien Hoa
668th Medical Detachment (AC)	4 May 1967	4 May 1967	Cam Ranh Bay
673d Medical Detachment (OA)	1 November 1965	12 November 1965	Saigon Port
915th Medical Detachment (KH)	*	*	Chu Lai
926th Medical Detachment (LB)	*	*	Chu Lai
932d Medical Detachment (AI)	23 December 1965	27 December 1965	Long Binh

- (Note 1) *Event occurred prior to 1 January 1967—Change of location in 1967 only
- (Note 2) Units with dates prior to 1 January 1967 were not listed in the Brigade's 1966 report

===== Personnel =====
The 222d Personnel Services Company (PSC), an Adjutant General (AG) company with MSC personnel officers assigned in place of AG officers, was assigned to the brigade in February and by 31 March had assumed personnel functions for the brigade including the administrative functions formerly accomplished by the various area support commands. The 222d PSC organized separate teams stationed at each group headquarters and the brigade headquarters, providing area personnel services with centralized personnel records at each team. Although this, in most cases, deprived the unit commanders of ready access to their units' personnel records, the increased standardization of procedures, personnel actions, and personnel management functions greatly outweighed this inconvenience.

On 10 August when the brigade became a major command under Headquarters, USARV, the immediate impact on the S-1 office was the increase in awards processed as a result of increased awards approval authority. This required an increase of personnel to handle the workload, and at the end of 1967 there were 3 enlisted and one officer devoting their full efforts to the awards program.

With the September arrival of the 67th Medical Group and the subsequent division of units located in the III Corps Tactical Zone between the 67th and the 68th Medical Groups, the additional requirement was placed on the 222d Personnel Services Company to provide another personnel team to service the group and attached units. This was accomplished by augmenting the team servicing the 68th Medical Group and having the team serve both groups.

A program to convert some military positions to local civilian hires, known as "Program 5 Civilianization," was initiated in the last quarter of 1967, with implementation scheduled for January 1968. This program converted low-skilled and basic entry MOS spaces in medical TOE units to civilian spaces.

There was a total of 872 civilian Local National personnel employed within units of the brigade at the end of 1967. The majority of these personnel were within the brigade's evacuation hospitals and were being utilized as ward attendants, kitchen personnel and in the clerical fields. More than 90% of the total employed were involved in support of the patient care mission. A number of employees assisted the 9th Medical Laboratory as laboratory assistants while others performed dental assistant jobs within the brigade's dental (KJ) detachments. The Civilian Personnel Directorate for the Republic of Vietnam had numerous training programs in effect to meet the brigade's requirements for skilled jobs.

Personnel Status as of 31 December 1967

		Authorized	Assigned
Officers		1830	1894
	Medical Corps	544	523
	Medical Service Corps	415	451
	Dental Corps	200	205
	Veterinary Corps	19	27
	Army Nurse Corps	671	653
	Army Medical Specialist Corps	1	9
	Chaplain Corps	21	21
	Adjutant General	3	5
Warrant Officers		138	115
Enlisted		5909	5979
Civilians		878	872
TOTAL		8755	8860

- (Note 1) This represents an increase in authorizations of 101 officers, 72 warrant officers and 551 enlisted for a total increase of 724 military spaces during the year.

===== Plans and operations =====
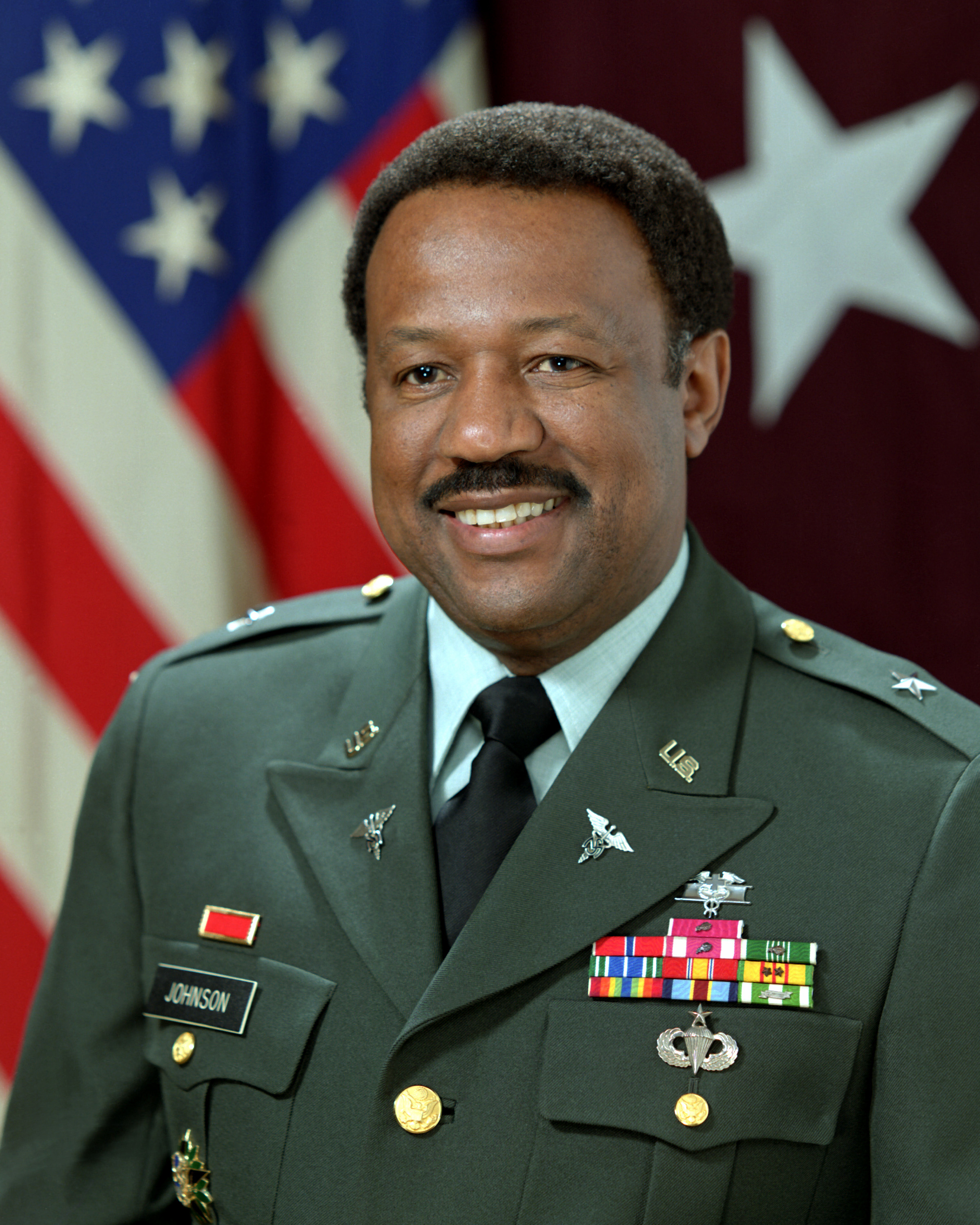
Captain Walter F. "Wally" Johnson III served as a plans and operations officer in the 44th Medical Brigade S-3 from December 1966-January 1968. As a Brigadier General, he would serve as Chief of the Army Medical Service Corps from October 1985 to October 1988

The brigade continued to provide Army level medical service in support of the Allied forces in the Republic of Vietnam during 1967 and medical resources increased commensurate with the rising troop strength. Medical service was provided by brigade units on an area basis by field, evacuation and surgical hospitals nearest the area of operation. Evacuation was provided by standby air ambulances within the area of operation. There was a sharp increase in combat operations in Vietnam in 1967. Brigade units were therefore faced with new challenges in providing the required Army level medical service.

These challenges were most capably met. Numerous offensive operations were conducted by allied Army forces that extended from I Corps Tactical Zone in the north to the delta in the south. Each of these operations was supported by brigade units. Several brigade units were relocated to support the fluid tactical situation. An additional mission was given to the brigade in the latter part of 1967. This involved providing hospitalization, medical, and surgical care to Vietnamese civilians wounded as a result of hostile action. Three hundred brigade beds were allocated for Vietnamese civilians to help satisfy this new requirement.

===== Aeromedical evacuation =====
At the start of 1967, the brigade had 49 air ambulances in one air ambulance company and four medical detachments (RA) to provide primary evacuation support for US and Free World Military Assistance Forces (FWMAF). Other forces were provided support on an as-available basis, with US and FWMAF receiving priority. The increase in allied troops in Vietnam was not accompanied by an attendant increase in medical aviation resources and the increased evacuation workload placed a strain on the existing aeromedical evacuation resources. Therefore, additional medical aviation units were requested for Vietnam based on projected increases in the US and Free World Military Assistance Forces. Until these added medical aviation units arrived, the increased evacuation requirements were met by a special issue of six helicopters by USARV to augment the medical evacuation capability. The special issue aircraft were assigned to "Dustoff" units according to demonstrated workload requirements. By the end of the year the brigade was performing the aeromedical evacuation mission with two air ambulance companies and eight helicopter ambulance detachments, which represented a doubling of the number of available air ambulances. The additional air ambulance units permitted a greater degree of flexibility in stationing, so as to provide more responsive support. From the widely scattered unit base heliports, individual air ambulances were field sited to increase responsiveness to combat forces engaged in operations. A total of 88,696 patients were evacuated by "Dustoff" units during 1967.

Aeromedical Evacuation Statistics 1967

Month	Patients Evacuated
January	7,420
February	5,299
March	6,592
April	6,506
May	7,349
June	6,971
July	5,408
August	7,356
September	7,033
October	7,780
November	9,730
December	11,190

Aircraft maintenance required close attention at all levels of command due to low aircraft availability rates. To provide increased availability, non-divisional aviation units, equivalent in size to the air ambulance company, were augmented with an organic direct support level maintenance capability. In addition, these same units were furnished back-up support from field army level direct support units from the 34th General Support Group. Medical units were not augmented with a direct support level maintenance capability as were the non-medical evacuation units of similar size. Since medical units received support from the same direct support units which were furnishing backup support for the non-medical units, the aircraft availability rate of medical units was less favorable. The medical mission, coupled with the absence of an organic direct support maintenance capability, prompted the aircraft maintenance support units to give "Dustoff" the highest priorities. Every effort was made to meet the Department of the Army goal of 80% aircraft availability but an availability rate of 70% was considered acceptable due to maintenance support limitations.

Many evacuation missions could be accomplished only with the aid of a hoist due to the heavy jungle canopy. Hoist missions, although extremely dangerous and employed only as a last resort, often provided the only opportunity for evacuating the wounded.

Insufficient hoists were introduced into Vietnam and the attendant maintenance difficulties reduced the total number available for "Dustoff" use. Only by shifting operational hoists from unit to unit, as required, were the hoist mission requirements adequately met.

Flying conditions in Vietnam proved to be a great threat to the safety of medical aircraft and crew in 1967 than combat damage resulting from enemy action. Though some accidents were caused by the failure pilots to react properly to a critical condition, the most prevalent causes of serious accidents were weather and poor visibility. Most of the medical pilots were instrument qualified with either a standard Army qualification or a tactical qualification. However, after arriving in Vietnam units did not stress instrument flying proficiency which left the average aviator with a minima1 ability to cope with actual instrument conditions suddenly thrust upon him. Upon recognizing this situation corrective action was taken by the Commanding General, 44th Medical Brigade, requiring every medical aviator to practice instrument flying in conjunction with assigned missions on a monthly basis.

Protective equipment for air crews was in severe shortage in 1967 as a result of additional aviation units being assigned to Vietnam. New stocks of ballistic helmets and chest protectors were not available in Vietnam or in the United States. Consequently, the 44th Medical Brigade redistributed assets throughout all medical aviation units with the guidance that the equipment would be shared by all crew members to the maximum extent.

The nature of tactical operations in Vietnam established that helicopter ambulance detachments were more suitable than air ambulance companies for supporting stability operations. The company was too large for centralized operations in Vietnam and the platoons had little or no capability for sustained independent operations. Detachments proved to be much better suited for Vietnam since they were small, capable of sustained independent operations, and could be easily moved from one location to another as the tactical situation dictated.

===== Medical regulating =====
Medical regulating in Vietnam was divided into the four distinct phases which had existed since the 44th Medical Brigade arrived in Vietnam in 1966. During 1967 the phases became more distinct because of increased efficiency which resulted from the application of experience to medical regulating and establishing a more definitive in-country aeromedical evacuation system.

Phase I involved the evacuation of patients from the site of injury to the nearest tactical, division level (Echelon/Role II) medical treatment facility.

Phase II overlapped Phase I and included the evacuation of patients from the site of injury or the division forward medical company to the nearest 44th Medical Brigade treatment facility capable of providing necessary and immediate treatment. Contrary to the classical concept of evacuation, this may have been a surgical hospital, field hospital, evacuation hospital (all Echelon/Role III) or field army level clearing company (Echelon/Role II). Medical group Medical Regulating Officers (MROs) located at group headquarters or group forward command posts had the primary responsibility for control of this phase and the primary means of evacuation was usually "Dustoff."

Phase III involved movement of patients to in-country treatment facilities to provide further definitive care, in-country convalescence, or an even distribution of patient workloads. Patients in this category usually had an expected length of hospitalization of less than 30 days. The initial responsibility for Phase III began with the medical group MRO. If evacuation to hospitals of another medical group was required, a request was submitted to the brigade MRO. At that point, the brigade MRO assumed responsibility for Phase III and distributed patient workload to hospitals capable of completing required treatment. The primary means of evacuation was provided by US Air Force fixed-wing aircraft, with "Dustoff" providing some assistance.

Phase IV included evacuation to out of country to United States Pacific Command (PACOM) or continental United States (CONUS) treatment facilities for extended definitive treatment or convalescence in excess of thirty days. Phase IV was the complete responsibility of the Brigade MRO and a change in procedure for out-of-country evacuations was initiated in November 1967. Although the change was referred to as a "new" system, there were no new concepts initiated because the "new" system was existing Army doctrine. It had not, however, previously been applied to aeromedical evacuation in Vietnam.

Prior to the change, patients identified by medical officers for out-of-country evacuation were moved from hospitals to the nearest US Air Force casualty staging facility. There, the patients were regulated through the Far East Joint Medical Regulating Office (FEJMRO) and the PACOM or CONUS destination hospital was obtained and recorded. Brigade and group MROs received an "after the fact" report of the number of patients evacuated out of country.

Major disadvantages included:

1. Lack of control of out-of-country evacuation by the brigade MRO
2. Hospitals were not aware of where patients were being transferred, which made follow-up of patients virtually impossible
3. Casualty staging facilities were completing and closing out clinical records since destination hospitals were not available at the time patients were moved from hospitals to casualty staging facilities

In early November the "new" system was tested and shortly thereafter put into effect. In this system, all hospitals submitted a request to their respective group MROs utilizing formats and diagnosis codes established in current regulations and submitted them to the brigade MRO. Brigade MRO consolidated the group reports and submitted them to the FEJMRO at which time the destination hospital for each patient was provided. This information was passed through groups to the hospitals, the patient's record was closed out, and the patient was prepared for movement to a casualty staging facility and subsequent evacuation out of country.

Initially, there was concern that this system would require excessive time to accomplish administrative requirements and this, in turn, would bog down an already "effective" system. However, it was soon shown that urgent evacuation requests could be processed within an hour, depending on the availability of aircraft. A 36-hour time frame was established for routine requests to provide hospitals with the necessary time for preparation of clinical records and completion of other administrative requirements.

Another problem area involved acquainting personnel with the system to ensure that patients were regulated to facilities capable of providing complete medical care. However, this problem was soon overcome, and the system proved to be very effective.

The major advantages were shown to have been the direct control of out-of-country evacuation by the brigade MRO and that hospitals were now aware of where patients were being transferred. One advantage, not anticipated, was that desirable advance information concerning the number of patients for evacuation was available much sooner for coordination with casualty staging facilities, the Military Airlift Command, and PACOM treatment facilities.

The system passed its most severe test in late November during McArthur, when over 400 patients were effectively evacuated to PACOM treatment facilities.

Hospitalization Statistics for 1967

Month	Admissions IRHA	Admissions DNBI	Evac Out of RVN	Returned to Duty	Hospital Deaths
January	1,388	5,615	1,469	5,891	56
February	1,752	5,616	1,851	5,246	86
March	2,204	6,043	2,178	5,970	116
April	2,135	6,363	1,780	6,163	75
May	3,141	7,227	2,367	7,174	107
June	2,307	7,791	2,072	7,279	120
July	1,756	10,158	1,595	7,226	120
August	1,419	9,885	1,521	7,490	100
September	1,317	7,283	1,431	6,785	130
October	1,503	8,138	1,851	7,341	117
November	2,194	7,793	2,435	7,453	154
December	1,790	7,528	2,152	7,038	161
Total	22,906	89,440	22,702	81,056	1342

- IRHA=Injured as a Result of Hostile Action
- DNBI=Disease and Non-Battle Injury
- Patients admitted in one month may be discharged, evacuated or die in a subsequent month

===== S-2/historian =====
The reassignment of the brigade directly under USARV required the brigade to create a full-time office to process and validate security clearances for the brigade's 8,000-plus personnel. Since these tasks had formerly been performed by the 1st Logistical Command, it was necessary for the brigade to establish a new system of records keeping, filing, and clearance processing procedures. The transition to a major division within the S-3 section was completed concurrently the brigade's move to Long Binh Post in late September 1967. At the beginning of October 1967 daily briefings were established by the S-3 for the brigade commanding general and staff. Intelligence summaries then routinely constituted a part of the briefings in which operations, aviation, and bed status reports were also given daily.

The assignment of the brigade historian to the S-2 position resulted in the historical duties also being assigned to that position. The two separate duties, although seemingly incompatible, proved to be quite complementary in their performance.

===== S-4 activities =====
By USARV Directive, a Medical Supply Satellization Program was initiated in July 1967. The support of non-divisional units, including separate brigades, battalions, and other units assigned to USARV or MACV, was initially established at the evacuation and field hospital level. It became apparent that this arrangement was insufficient since units were widely scattered throughout RVN. Surgical hospitals, dispensaries, and clearing companies operating medical treatment facilities had to be incorporated into the support effort.

The initial burden of the program was almost overwhelming due to the limited unit level accounting procedures in effect at the time. Limited medical supply staffs were further burdened with completely inadequate stocks from which to support their new customers. There were no standardized supply procedures in effect at the unit level and it became obvious to the brigade staff that without action on their part, units would be unable to support themselves and their satellites.

To correct these problems, the brigade took several actions:

1. Personal visits were made to all units in the command to analyze the problem
2. A comprehensive study was prepared, submitted and approved by the brigade commander which outlined the major deficiencies and proposed solutions to the problems at hand
3. Interim directives were developed and published on Materiel Accounting and Control Implementation, for use at all levels
4. With the concurrence of the UUSARV G-3 and G-4, stockage levels of the hospitals were established at levels authorized for direct support units
5. Recognition of additional warehouse and storage requirements for hospitals was obtained and entered in the MACV construction criteria
6. Supply Information Letters were initiated to provide information to the field
7. Supply shortages were monitored at the group and brigade levels in conjunction with the medical depot and 1st Logistical Command to pinpoint problem areas and effect redistribution
8. 9Excesses were uncovered and returned to the supply system
9. In conjunction with the theater consultants, outmoded supply controls were eliminated or modified to permit greater flexibility at the hospital commander's level to procure sorely needed medical supplies and equipment
10. An aggressive control on requisition priorities was implemented which conclusively improved the supply operations.
11. Group S-4s were required to:
- Conduct quarterly meetings with all supply personnel to assist and help clarify problem areas
- Make quarterly inspections of their commands using inspection sheets and guidelines furnished by the brigade and require correction of deficiencies

===== Chief nurse =====
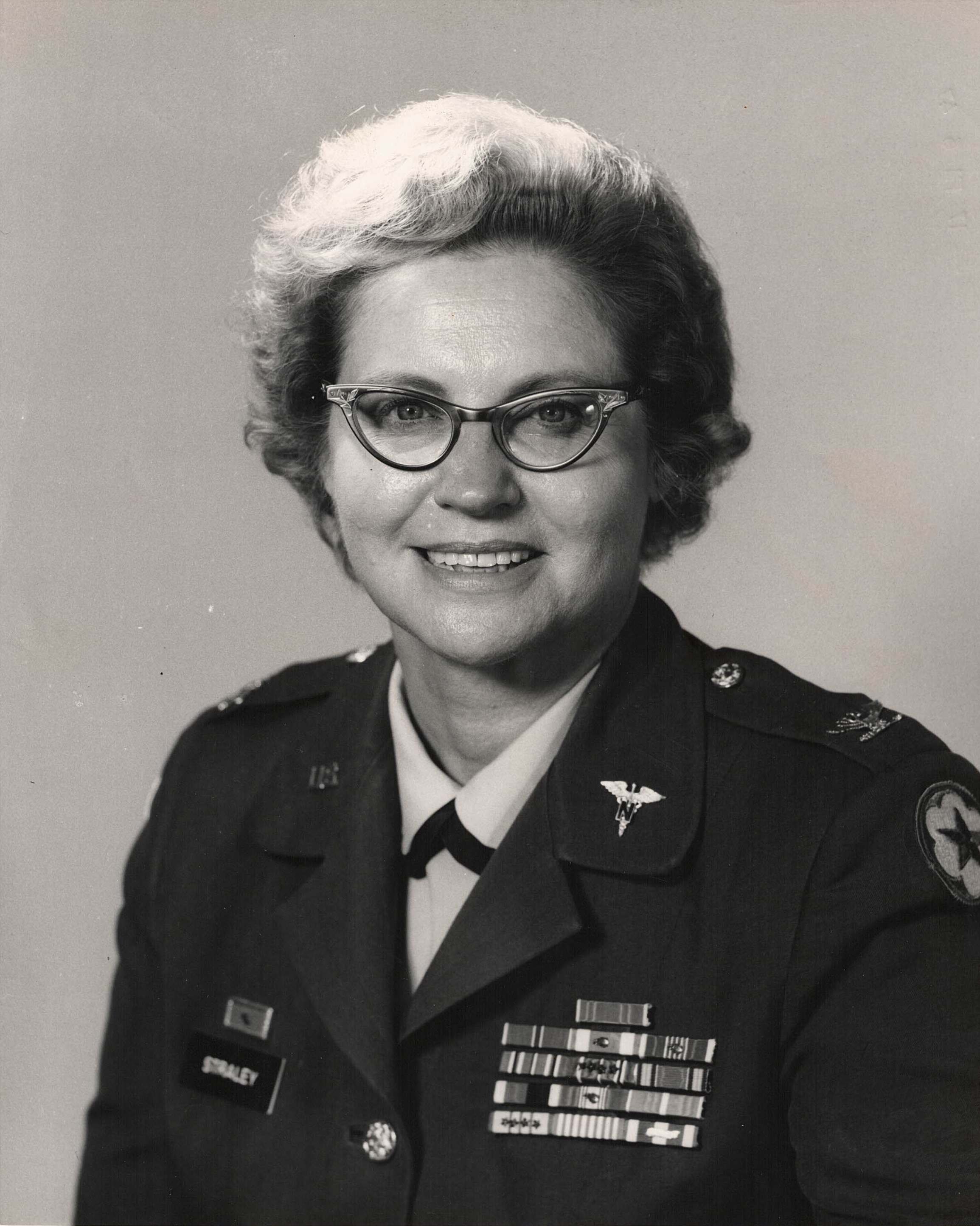
In March 1967, Lieutenant Colonel Rose V. Straley (shown here as a colonel in 1972) was assigned as the 44th Medical Brigade's first chief nurse

On 12 March 1967, Lieutenant Colonel Rose V. Straley, Army Nurse Corps (ANC), was assigned to headquarters, 44th Medical Brigade as its first chief nurse. Following the reassignment of the brigade directly under USARV, the offices of the chief nurse, USARV, and the chief nurse of the brigade were merged. Lieutenant Colonel Jennie L. Caylor, the ranking nurse, assumed the duties of brigade chief nurse on 27 September 1967.

==== 1968 ====
===== Mission and functions =====
Throughout 1968, the mission of the 44th Medical Brigade was to provide medical service support to United States Army personnel, Free World Military Assistance Forces Personnel, and other categories of personnel as directed, to provide hospitalization, medical and surgical care to Vietnamese civilians injured as a result of hostile action.

The 29 specified functions of the brigade remained unchanged from 1967.

===== Relocation of brigade headquarters =====
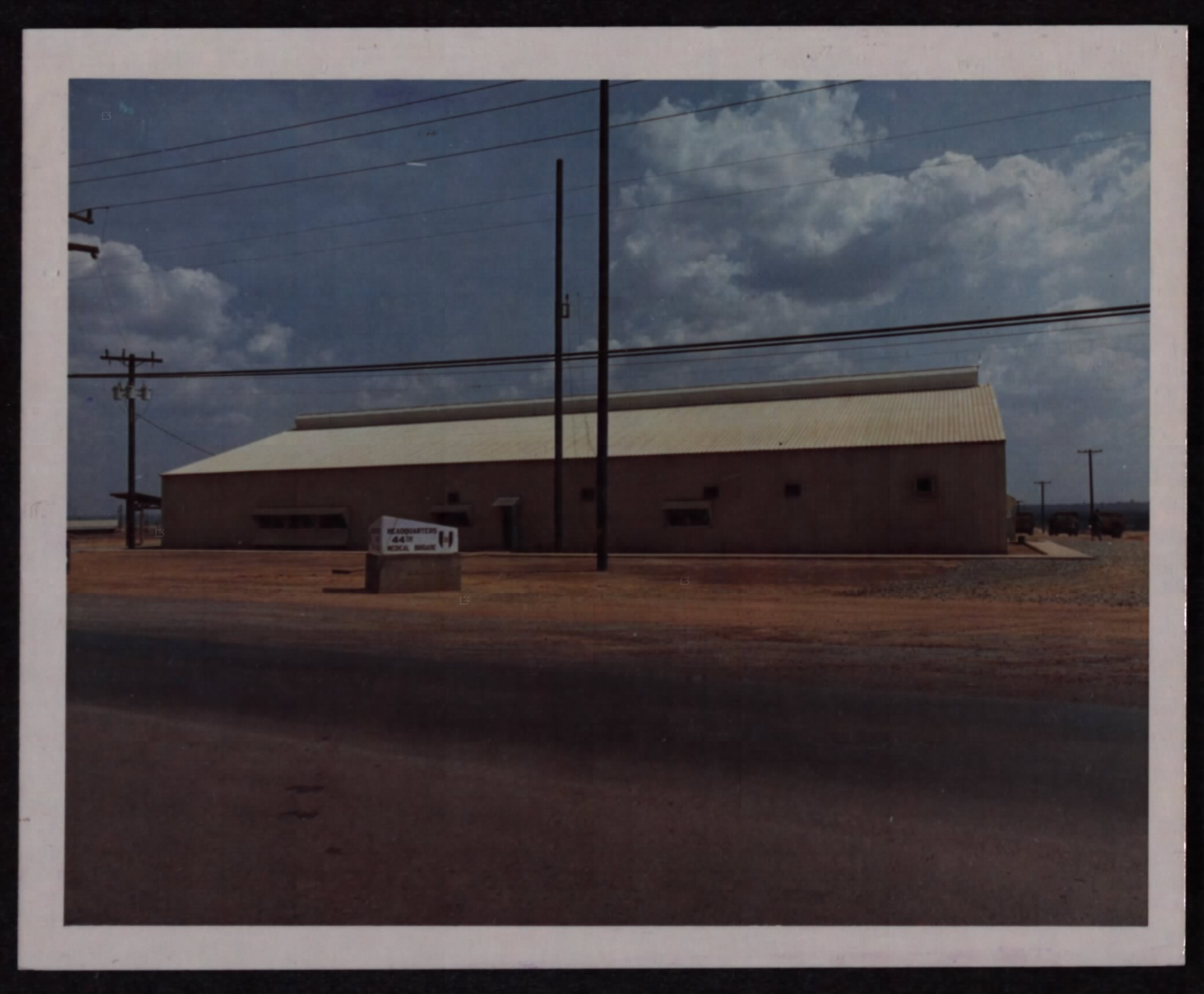
44th Medical Brigade Headquarters, Building 5743, Long Binh Post, Republic of Vietnam, January 1969

On 4 October 1968, the 44th Medical Brigade relocated its headquarters, moving from temporary buildings to a permanent building, #5743, located off MacArthur loop on Long Binh Post. All brigade staff sections were consolidated in the new building which provided a considerable increase in office space. The brigade headquarters detachment and enlisted billets remained in buildings #5523 to No. 5525 in the old brigade headquarters area, located approximately 500 meters from the new building.

===== Organization of groups and subordinate units =====
A major geographical realignment of medical groups occurred in February 1968 when the 67th Medical Group relocated its headquarters from Bien Hoa in III Corps Tactical Zone (CTZ) to Da Nang and assumed responsibility for medical care in the I CTZ. At the end of the 1968, the majority of 44th Medical Brigade units were deployed by geographical areas under the control of four medical groups: the 67th Medical Group in I CTZ with headquarters in Da Nang, the 55th Medical Group in II CTZ North with headquarters in Qui Nhon, the 43d Medical Group II CTZ South with headquarters in Nha Trang and the 68th Medical Group responsible for medical care in III and IV CTZ with headquarters at Long Binh.

Dental, veterinary, laboratory and preventive medicine units and the medical depot came under direct operational control of the 44th Medical Brigade Headquarters. The arrival of the 522d Medical Detachment (Team AF) (Veterinary Professional Services) in March 1968 provided one command and control element for all brigade veterinary units. With the arrival of the 172d Preventive Medicine Unit in June 1968 the command structure was changed to include two preventive medicine units under direct operational control of the brigade headquarters.

The only other major subordinate unit to relocate during 1968 was the 9th Medical Laboratory which moved from Saigon to Long Binh in November.

At the end of 1968 the 44th Medical Brigade was composed of 169 units. Of those, 42 arrived in-country during 1968.

A chronological summary with pertinent information depicting the arrival of new units during 1968 follows:

Unit	Arrival date	Date operational	Location
930th Medical Detachment (MB)	19 January	15 February	Long Binh
764th Medical Detachment (IE)	1 February	10 February	Cam Ranh Bay
218th Medical Detachment (MC)	4 March	20 March	Cholon
238th Medical Detachment (KA)	15 March	13 April	Chu Lai
760th Medical Detachment (JB)	24 March	3 April	Qui Nhon
27th Surgical Hospital	25 March	13 April	Chu Lai
95th Evacuation Hospital	25 March	28 April	Da Nang
566th Medical Company (Ambulance)	26 March	5 April	Da Nang
522d Medical Detachment (AF)	27 March	10 April	Long Binh
245th Medical Detachment (JB)	29 March	3 April	Long Binh
359th Medical Detachment (IE)	30 April	5 May	Dong Tam
459th Medical Detachment (IE)	30 April	5 May	An Khe
185th Medical Detachment (MA)	30 April	6 May	Phu Loi
194th Medical Detachment (MC)	30 April	1 June	Long Binh
210th Medical Detachment (MC)	1 May	8 May	Pleiku
499th Medical Detachment (KJ)	20 May	24 May	Bien Hoa
29th Evacuation Hospital	20 May	24 August	Can Tho
176th Medical Detachment (JB)	22 May	27 May	Cam Ranh Bay
219th Medical Detachment (KJ)	24 May	27 May	Chu Lai
175th Medical Detachment (JB)	24 May	27 May	Da Nang
520th Medical Company (Clearing)	23 March	5 April	Chu Lai
172d Preventive Medicine Unit (Service) (Field)	27 June	29 Jul	An Khe
188th Medical Detachment (PA)	28 June	30 July	Long Binh
43d Medical Detachment (RB)	29 June	23 August	Can Tho
545th Medical Detachment (FC)	24 August	18 September	Cam Ranh Bay
666th Medical Detachment (GA)	24 August	18 September	Cam Ranh Bay
**650th Medical Detachment (KJ)	27 August	4 September	Long Binh
*312th Evacuation Hospital	6 September	10 October	Chu Lai
*74th Field Hospital	15 September	14 October	Long Binh
*305th Medical Detachment (KB)	17 September	1 October	Chu Lai
*378th Medical Detachment (KE)	19 September	1 October	Chu Lai
*316th Medical Detachment (NC)	19 September	26 September	Saigon
*313th Medical Detachment (KA)	30 September	4 October	Phu Bai
*472d Medical Detachment (RB)	26 September	6 October	Chu Lai
*482d Medical Detachment (GD)	28 September	14 November	Cam Ranh Bay
*889th Medical Detachment (KA)	30 September	1 October	Chu Lai
*311th Field Hospital	11 October	9 November	Phu Thanh
1st Medical Laboratory (Mobile)	26 October	15 Dec	Phu Bai
68th Medical Detachment (RA)	28 November	10 January 1969	Tuy Hoa
236th Medical Detachment (RA)	28 November	30 December	Da Nang
237th Medical Detachment (RA)	28 November	1 January 1969	Camp Evans
247th Medical Detachment (RA)	21 December	23 December	Dong Tam

- (Note 1) *=US Army Reserve unit called to active duty
- (Note 2) **=National Guard unit called to active Federal service

A sponsorship program for newly arriving units was developed and published as a brigade regulation. The purpose of the program was to ensure that arriving units were integrated into the command with minimum delay and provided necessary support and assistance until they became operational or otherwise self-supporting. The sponsoring unit was required to prepare a plan for support for the incoming unit to include arrival of their advance party, main body, and unit equipment. Because of the emphasis given to detailed advanced planning and command interest, effective coordination was accomplished and units arriving in-country were fully integrated into the brigade and ongoing operations with minimal delay.

===== S-1 =====
At the beginning of 1968 the S-1 activities of the brigade were limited to officer assignments, awards and decorations, safety program monitoring, and public information liaison with Headquarters, USARV. The primary personnel action agency was the 222d Personnel Services Company located on Long Binh Post, which in turn placed a personnel service team at each medical group head quarters. Personnel records were maintained by each team at the medical group headquarters. Assignment authorization for Medical Corps officers was retained by USARV and accomplished by specialty consultants located at that headquarters. In early 1968 the S-1 Section consisted of an S-1 officer and three branch chiefs: Officer Personnel Branch, Awards Branch, and Manpower Control. Safety reporting was the responsibility of the Chief, Awards Branch, while the Chief of Officer Personnel handled Public Information Officer (PIO) activities. All enlisted assignments and requisitions were made by the 222d Personnel Services Company.

Numerous changes were made during the year which resulted in a complete overhaul of the missions and functions as well as the physical organization of the S-1 Section. In March 1968 the S-1 Section was reorganized to perform the seven basic functions outlined in FM 101-5, "Staff Organization and Operations," as follows:

1. Maintenance of unit strength including policy, procedures, and strength reporting
2. Personnel management
3. Manpower control
4. Development and maintenance of morale
5. Discipline, law, and order
6. Headquarters management
7. Miscellaneous

In order to fully implement the functions described above, an enlisted branch was organized, a requirement for MOS inventories instituted, and staff management of enlisted personnel in such areas as distribution, promotion, monitoring of MOS progression, and infusions was instituted. Additionally, a separate PIO Branch was established and information specialists requisitioned to meet brigade information requirements.

Affecting S-1 operations significantly in 1968 were the following notable events:

- 22 March—Establishment of the Enlisted Personnel Branch
- 1 April—Imposition of a 200-space cut by USARV
- 1 May—Establishment of Program Six civilianization with a loss of 317 military spaces and gain of 476 local hire (Vietnamese) spaces
- June—Review of strength accounting procedures
- 1 June—Implementation of centralized orders system
- 15 August—Formation of Morale and Welfare Branch with full time emphasis on safety, awards, and special services
- 7 September—Establishment of full-time PIO Section
- 10 October—Graduation of the first US trained civilian medical corpsman through training program conducted by the 68th Medical Group
- 8 November—Implementation of an additional manning level (MOS) drawdown of 493 enlisted spaces

In early April a review of enlisted promotion procedures was required by inspector general complaints. This review resulted in a complete revision of promotion procedures and the brigade's internal management system.

Major activities in the Manpower Branch during 1968 were related to a series of personnel cuts instituted by the Department of the Army and USARV levels. The first or these cuts, a civilianization plan call "Program Six", was initiated in January 1968. This plan called for a loss of 317 military spaces and their replacement by 476 locally hired and trained Vietnamese civilians. A temporary deferment was required during the Tet Offensive period, but in May the program resumed with a scheduled completion date of May 1969.

In selecting the positions to be converted, the following criteria were used:

1. No replacement of personnel higher than grade E-3
2. Lowest skill MOS were replaced
3. Replacement personnel in labor-type positions were utilized
4. Clearing companies and surgical hospitals, because of their mission requirements and possibility of deployment were not levied

In April the Phase I Program was instituted involving a cut of two hundred spaces, followed in November by the Phase II reduction of two hundred additional spaces. The final development in this area was a loss of 493 spaces in a November MOS drawdown.

The strength of the command as of l January 1968 was 8,860 assigned personnel. The end of the year assigned strength was 10,468.

Personnel Status as of 31 December 1968

		Authorized	Assigned
Officers		2,504	2,129
	Medical Corps	760	532
	Medical Service Corps	480	496
	Dental Corps	249	223
	Veterinary Corps	54	55
	Army Nurse Corps	928	782
	Army Medical Specialist Corps	1	15
	Chaplain Corps	27	25
	Adjutant General	3	1
Warrant Officers		198	170
Enlisted		7,670	6,889
Civilians		1,616	1,280
TOTAL		11,989	10,468

- (Note 1) This represents an increase in authorizations of 775 officers, 60 warrant officers and 1,761 enlisted for a total increase of 2,496 military spaces during the year.

A special emphasis area during 1968 was the hiring of Vietnamese civilians. As of 31 December, 1,280 civilians were being utilized throughout the brigade. Included in their tasks were such jobs as clerks, ambulance orderlies, kitchen police, mechanics' helpers, warehousemen, preventive medicine helpers and veterinary assistants. In furtherance of this program a medical training class was established on 21 October 1968 by the 68th Medical Group. Based on the Fort Sam Houston Medical Training Center's 91A program, this eight-week series of classes followed by two weeks on-the-job training prepared Vietnamese workers for jobs previously held exclusively by relatively low-skilled US military personnel. The first class of thirty-three students graduated on 21 December 1968 and would be followed by a second group in early 1969.

On 1 October 1968 a new system for Medical Corps officers was implemented. Previously, all medical corps officers had been assigned directly to brigade units by the USARV Surgeon's office. Transfers could not be made within the medical groups without approval from both the brigade and the surgeon's office. To correct the shortcomings of this situation, the brigade commander, General Neel, directed that all Medical Corps officers would be assigned only to group level and that each group commander would determine the specific unit of assignment. The authority to reassign officers between groups and to make initial group assignments was retained by the Commanding General, 44th Medical Brigade. This new policy greatly increased the flexibility of both the group and the brigade by allowing for the rapid relocation of Medical Corps officer resources to meet changing tactical situations. Under the old system it was possible for transfers to be delayed as long as seven days; however, under the new system, relocation could be accomplished within 24 hours. The assignment of personnel in other Medical Department branches were not affected by these changes.

On 1 December 1968, using the computer capabilities of the 222d Personnel Services Company, the Officer's Branch established a card file for better control of Medical Corps officers. Two sets of cards were maintained in the file: one set filed to show the resources of each medical unit and the other filed according to MOS. As a result, the brigade headquarters was able to present a complete picture of Medical Corps resources both by unit and MOS. This system greatly enhanced the management of Medical Corps officer resources by enabling the brigade commander to determine immediately the status of any given Medical Corps MOS in the brigade and to determine the specialties available at any given hospital. Files were constantly updated by maintaining a flow of input to the system showing changes in duty, MOS, or assignment.

The most significant enlisted personnel developments during 1968 concerned alterations in the enlisted promotion system resulting from changes 21 and 23 to AR 600-200 and the beginning of the E-8 and E-9 centralized promotion system.

The arrival in-country of eleven reserve units during 1968 created a significant infusion problem for the brigade. However, the infusion was well on its way to being completed at year's end and the brigade as a whole was well infused. While individual units may have faced local infusion problems, the means for overall infusion were available to the brigade and complete infusion of the units were expected to be accomplished on schedule in 1969.

The Morale and Welfare Branch was organized on 15 August 1968 to establish procedures and policies in the areas of non-appropriated funds, safety, grants, and special services.

Until organization of a separate branch, non-appropriated fund activities were shared as additional duties by the three officers in the S-1 office. Many problems were encountered in these areas, particularly in non-appropriated funds. In August 1968 the brigade had thirty unauthorized other sundry funds, several of which were in serious financial condition. As a first step to correct this situation, command letters of instruction were disseminated to all units directing them either to submit their funds for review and authorization by the brigade headquarters or to dissolve their funds immediately in accordance with established directives and regulations. On 28 August 1968 the first other sundry fund in the brigade was approved and by 25 November, twenty-five approved other sundry funds were in operation in facilities from Phu Bi in I Corps to Can Tho in the IV Corps area. The remaining unauthorized funds were liquidated.

The brigade safety program underwent major revisions beginning on 4 September 1968 when strong command emphasis was given to the expeditious reporting of accidents to ensure that adequate corrective actions were taken to prevent recurrences. Through liaison with USARV, many safety handouts and posters were obtained and distributed throughout the brigade as part of a vigorous safety program. In November 1968, follow-up actions were taken during command inspections. Utilizing a brigade safety checklist, particular attention was focused on vehicle, fire, weapons, and water safety.

Having been given awards authority up to the Bronze Star Medal in August 1967, the brigade awards program peaked during 1968. Through the use of streamlined filing and processing procedures, an average of 200 awards per week were processed. These awards ranged from the USARV Certificate of Achievement to a recommended Medal of Honor for Major Patrick Henry Brady.

Decorations awarded by month

Month	AM	AM w/V	ARCOM	ARCOM w/V	BSM	BSM w/V	Purple Hearts*	Total less Purple Hearts
January	563	43	126	1	62	2	1,958	797
February	573	8	76	5	39	7	2,683	708
March	443	37	110	2	94	2	2,462	688
April	810	14	138	1	98	8	2,769	1,069
May	748	6	159	13	88	3	3,952	1,017
June	525	12	151	5	104	5	1,858	802
July	345	10	250	7	133	9	1,468	754
August	372	5	150	4	66	11	2,140	708
September	764	10	75	2	126	12	1,964	1,064
October	204	8	90	0	58	0	1,493	345
November	575	0	90	0	76	0	1,659	741
December	256	29	139	25	48	9	1,513	506
Total	6178	182	1714	65	992	68	25,919	9,199

- (Note 1) Included in these figures are Purple Hearts awarded by hospital commanders to patients
- (Note 2) Abbreviation: AM=Air Medal; ARCOM=Army Commendation Medal; BSM=Bronze Star Medal; w/V=awarded for Valor

The 222d Personnel Services company provided personnel support to approximately 165 separate medical units, processing an average of 800-850 individuals in and out of Vietnam each month during 1968. The total number of records maintained at any given time during the year Was slightly less than 10,000. The 222d headquarters at Long Binh Post controlled four separate teams located at Long Binh, Nha Trang, Qui Nhon, and Da Nang. Each team provided support to a medical group plus those separate units reporting directly to brigade headquarters which were located within the area of responsibility of the medical group. The AG section, administrative section, and machine branch, which included a Univac 1005 computer, were also located at Long Binh. Unit strength was as follows:

	Authorized	Actual
Officer	3	7
Warrant Officer	4	3
Enlisted	132	193

The increased strength was dictated by the mission and the dispersal of the unit to provide decentralized support.

The commander of the 222d served as Adjutant General for the 44th Medical Brigade. The 222d was commanded and staffed by Medical Service Corpe officers and an Adjutant General Corps (AGC) officer in contrast to other personnel service companies which were usually exclusively staffed by AGC officers. This system enabled young MSC personnel officers an opportunity to gain valuable experience in the personnel field.

In early 1968 the lack of a brigade courier system resulted in a very slow, time-consuming distribution system. For example, distribution required from 20 to 25 days to travel from Da Nang to Long Binh. Additional time was required to return information to the sender. A courier system was instituted in August 1968 which expedited the exchange of information between medical units throughout Vietnam. The timeframe for exchange of information between Da Nang and Long Binh was reduced, in some cases, to three days. Related to this problem was the lack of effective and regular communication with the teams located throughout the country.

===== S-3 operations =====
The year 1968 can be divided into three distinct but somewhat overlapping phases. The first part of the year was concerned with a major relocation of medical units into the I Corps Tactical Zone (CTZ). This was followed and accompanied by a large-scale deployment of medical units into Vietnam. The third phase occurred during the latter part of the year when command and staff attention was directed to realignment and refinement of the field army medical service within the Republic of Vietnam.

The first major operational event that occurred during 1968 was the redeployment of major US Army tactical units into I CTZ. This buildup consisted of approximately two divisions plus support troops. In order to provide medical support to these forces, brigade units were relocated into and within I CTZ as follows:

1. The 67th Medical Group headquarters was moved from Bien Hoa to Da Nang to exercise command and control over brigade units in I CTZ.
2. The 22d Surgical Hospital was moved from Long Binh to Phu Bai
3. The 18th Surgical Hospital was moved from Lai Khe to Quang Tri
4. The 571st Medical Detachment (RA) and the 874th Medical Detachment (RB) were relocated from Nha Trang to Phu Bai
5. The 500th Medical Detachment (RB) was moved from Long Binh to Da Nang.
6. The 2dPlatoon, 563d Medical Company (Clearing) was relocated within I CTZ from Chu Lai to Phu Bai
7. The 4th Advance Platoon (Provisional) 32d Medical Depot was organized in early February and stationed at Phu Bai to provide medical supply throughout I CTZ

The second phase involved the deployment of medical units from the continental United States (CONUS) into the Republic of Vietnam (RVN). In March, five medical units arriving in-country were assigned to the 67th Medical Group. These units were the 95th Evacuation Hospital and the 566th Medical Company (Ambulance) stationed at Da Nang, and the 27th Surgical Hospital, 520th Medical Company (Clearing), and the 238th Medical Detachment (KA) stationed at Chu Lai. By the end of April there were 20 brigade units employed in the I CTZ. To provide dental support for the increased number of troops in I CTZ, the 56th Medical Detachment was relocated from Camp Radcliff (near An Khe) to Phu Bai. During the period or this buildup, medical units subordinate to the 67th Medical Group supported Operation Pegasus in the relief of the siege of Khe Sanh and Operation Delaware in the A Shau Valley. Major army units supported were the 1st Cavalry Division (Airmobile), 101st Airborne Division, and the Americal Division.

A second major operational event occurred during the year when major US tactical units were deployed to the Mekong Delta in IV CTZ. In order to provide medical support to the operations of the 9th Infantry Division in IV CTZ, a hospital unit arriving in-country was designated to be stationed in the Delta. This hospital, the 29th Evacuation Hospital, became operational at Can Tho during August 1968 and, together with the 3d Surgical Hospital, already located at Dong Tam, provided hospitalization in the Mekong Delta. The aeromedical capability in this area was doubled with the arrival of the 247th Medical Detachment (RA) at Dong Tam in December, joining the 82d Medical Detachment (RA), which had been stationed at Soc Trang since November 1964. At the end of 1968, the alignment of medical services provided efficient, responsive support to the operations of the US Army and ARVN forces in the IV CTZ.

In the third phase, measures were taken to refine and realign medical services within Vietnam. In order to ensure a more balanced alignment of evacuation and surgical hospitals in I and II CTZs, the following plan was implemented:

1. The 2d Surgical Hospital would relocate in October 1968 from Chu Lai to Lai Khe
2. The 312th Evacuation Hospital, a mobilized Army Reserve unit scheduled to arrive in late September would operate the hospital facility at Chu Lai vacated by the 2d Surgical Hospital
3. The 85th Evacuation Hospital would relocate from Qui Nhon to Phu Bai when facilities became available at the new location

The plan was implemented. During the first week of September the 2d Surgical Hospital was alerted for movement and directed to vacate and release facilities to the incoming reserve evacuation hospital. The 85th Evacuation Hospital was alerted to move to Phu Bai.

Construction of the facilities for the 2d Surgical Hospital at Lai Khe did not proceed in accordance with the original schedule; because of this, the move of the 2d Surgical Hospital to Lai Khe was deferred and a provisional 100 bed hospital was formed at Phu Bai using the personnel resources of the 2d Surgical Hospital. In November 1968, the 85th Evacuation Hospital was moved to Phu Bai. During December the 2d Surgical Hospital moved to Lai Khe and the provisional hospital at Phu Bai was discontinued.

This plan had the following effects:

1. Provided a surgical hospital in direct support of the 1st Infantry Division at Lai Khe
2. Provided immediate employment of the arriving 312th Evacuation Hospital in Chu Lai in facilities more suited to an evacuation hospital than a surgical hospital
3. Reduced the number of evacuation hospitals in Qui Nhon from two to one by moving the 85th Evacuation Hospital to Phu Bai
4. Permitted the deletion of the 94th Evacuation Hospital from the units programmed to arrive in country

Other significant unit relocations which occurred during 1968 included:

1. During October, the 9th Medical Laboratory moved from Saigon to Long Binh. This movement was part of the command effort to reduce the US military presence in the Saigon area
2. In December, the 18th Surgical Hospital was moved within I CTZ from Quang Tri to Camp Evans. This relocation resulted in a more secure location for the hospital as well as improved facilities

===== Utilization of USAR hospitals for POW care =====
Two field hospitals (POW) arrived in RVN in October 1968. Both units, the 74th Field Hospital (POW) and the 311th Field Hospital (POW), were USAR hospitals that were called to active duty in May 1968. After a brief acclimatization period, each unit assumed the mission of providing complete medical and surgical care for a 250 bed Prisoner of War (POW) hospital.

The 74th Field Hospital was located at Long Binh and assumed responsibility for medical treatment of prisoners of war in III and IV CTZs. The 311th Field Hospital was divided into two hospital units: the unit in Qui Nhon provided primary medical and surgical care while the unit located in the Phu Thanh Valley served as a convalescent center. These units would be consolidated upon completion of the new hospital facilities in the Phu Thanh Valley.

Prior to the arrival of the field hospitals, the POW hospital mission was accomplished by two clearing companies (TOE 8-128G) The utilization of field hospitals, rather than clear-ng companies, to operate POW hospitalization facilities resulted in certain distinct and inherent advantages. The most obvious advantage was the increased number of beds operated by the field hospitals (250 beds) versus that of the clearing company (160 beds). Additionally, the organic professional capability of the field hospitals permitted these units to expand the POW mission in the areas of surgery, x-ray, pharmacy, and laboratory services. It was further recognized that the Army Nurse Corps officers assigned to the hospitals contributed greatly to the overall reduction in POW patient recovery time. This achievement was primarily due to their supervisory abilities as well as their individual nursing talents.

===== S-3 plans =====
In addition to publishing operations plans and orders implementing plans and orders of higher headquarters the 44th Medical Brigade published a plan to support contingencies which would require the brigade to rapidly deploy medical units in support of tactical operations. This plan provided for deployment of various types of units subordinate to the brigade.

Implementing plans were published by each subordinate medical group and by the veterinary and dental command and control detachments. Specific units were designated to react within a short time frame to orders of the brigade headquarters. The result of this planning action was the establishment of a cross section of medical units capable of deploying within a minimum time.

===== S-3 area medical surveys =====
In October 1968, Headquarters, United States Army, Vietnam (USARV) directed the brigade to conduct a survey of medical resources on all major bases and tactical operating bases. Headquarters, Military Assistance Command, Vietnam (MACV) authorized the brigade to survey US Army medical facilities throughout Vietnam and those US Air Force and US Navy medical facilities located on installations designated to be surveyed. The main purpose of the survey was to ensure that each geographic area in which USARV troops were stationed was provided adequate medical coverage without an overlap or duplication of medical resources. An additional objective was to obtain a clearer visualization of the manner in which the medical service functioned at each of the major logistical bases.

The following 19 bases were selected by the brigade headquarters to be surveyed by medical groups responsible for medical care in their areas:

- 43d Medical Group
  - Cam Ranh Bay
  - Nha Trang
  - Tuy Hoa
  - Phan Rang
- 55th Medical Group
  - Qui Nhon
  - Pleiku
- 67th Medical Group
  - Chu Lai
  - Da Nang
  - Phu Bai
  - Camp Evans
- 68th Medical Group
  - Long Binh
  - Vung Tau
  - Saigon/Cholon/Tan Son Nhut
  - Cu Chi
  - Can Tho
  - Bien Hoa
  - Lai Khe
  - Bear Cat
  - Long Giao

The groups were not allowed to delegate responsibility for the conduct of the surveys to subordinate units. A detailed format was developed for the groups to utilize in documenting the results of each survey. This format, along with the requirement that the group headquarters conduct the surveys insured both comprehensiveness and standardization. Every aspect of medical support at a given base was required to be surveyed, to include preventive medicine, evacuation, hospitalization, laboratory service, dental service, veterinary service and dispensary service. At the end of 1968, the first two surveys had been completed and forwarded to Headquarters, USARV.

===== Medical regulating =====
During 1968, the mission of the Medical Regulating Office continued to be the control of patient evacuation within and out of the Republic of Vietnam. Accumulation of daily medical statistics for medical regulating purposes remained a function of the office. The Medical Record Statistics Division, USARV Surgeon's Office continued to function as the primary agency for medical records and reports.

The importance of having a responsive medical regulating system was dramatically demonstrated during both the Tet Offensive and the May Offensive.

During February and May, close coordination with the US Air Force aeromedical evacuation team was necessary to preclude overloads at the casualty staging flights and to arrange additional special flights, which in some cases originated at alternate air fields not normally used for out-of-country evacuations. The support and cooperation of the US Air Force played an extremely important role in the successful operation of the 44th Medical Brigade's medical regulating system.

In early 1968, there were few scheduled in-country and out-of-country flights available which limited evacuation and created the need for nonscheduled special flights. Shortly after the Tet Offensive, the number of scheduled in-country flights by the 903d Aeromedical Evacuation Squadron was increased to seven. These flights included stops at every major airfield in Vietnam and thereby provided fixed-wing evacuation capability to every major brigade hospital. Out-of-country evacuation flights operated by the Military Airlift Command originated from casualty staging facilities located at Da Nang, Cam Ranh Bay and Tan Son Nhut and provided evacuation to Japan, Clark Air Force Base in the Philippines, Guam, Okinawa and Hawaii. With the increase in scheduled flights adequate coverage became available throughout Vietnam and allowed almost continuous medical evacuation.

During the May Offensive, a total of 3,948 patients, 3,789 of which were US Army personnel, were medically evacuated out-of-country to PACOM hospitals. These figures were the highest in the brigade's history.

Hospitalization Statistics for 1968

Month	Admissions IRHA	Admissions DNBI	Evac Out of RVN	Returned to Duty	Hospital Deaths
January	3,563	6,184	2,417	6,771	196
February	4,996	4,982	3,576	6,458	270
March	3,866	5,171	2,471	5,840	216
April	3,752	6,156	2,782	6,747	198
May	5,715	6,950	3,952	8,285	271
June	2,981	7,184	2,701	7,147	184
July	2,102	7,414	2,569	7,673	203
August	3,712	7,894	2,700	6,491	212
September	3,528	7,938	3,401	6,428	242
October	2,676	8,637	2,856	6,331	198
November	3,170	8,120	2,790	6,706	277
December	3.118	8,261	3,176	6,920	244

- IRHA=Injured as a Result of Hostile Action
- DNBI=Disease and Non-Battle Injury
- Patients admitted in one month may be discharged, evacuated, or die in a subsequent month

Hospitalization Statistics—Tet Offensive
0001 Hours, 29 January 1968 — 2400 Hours, 3 February 1968
Total Direct Admissions = 3261
Total Injured as a Result of Hostile Action (IRHA) = 2171

- US Army IRHA = 1213
- Civilian War Casualty Program (CWCP) Admissions = 477
- Other IRHA = 481

Total Dispositions = 2342

- Dispositions to Duty and Discharge = 1255
- Evacuation Out of Country = 1005
- Died in Hospital = 82

31 Jan 1968- Hospitals experienced heaviest admission workload as outlined below:
Total Direct Admissions = 707
Total IRHA = 541

- US Army IRHA = 385
- CWCP Admissions = 49
- Other IRHA = 107

Prisoner of War Patients as of 2400 hours, 28 January 1968 = 258
Prisoner of War Patients as of 2400 hours, 3 February 1968 = 386
Increase = 128

Civilian War Casualty Program Patients as of 2400 hours, 28 January 1968 = 129
Civilian War Casualty Program Patients as of 2400 hours, 3 February 1968 = 505
Increase = 376

44th Medical Brigade Daily Medical Statistics—Tet Offensive
0001 Hours, 29 January 1968 — 2400 Hours, 3 February 1968

	29 January	30 January	31 January	1 February	2 February	3 February	Total
Total Direct Admissions	324	549	707	628	542	511	3,261
Total IRHA Admissions	75	380	541	467	387	321	2,171
U.S. Army IRHA	57	164	385	215	224	168	1,213
CWCP Admissions	7	100	49	146	84	91	477
Other IRHA	11	116	107	106	79	62	481
Total Dispositions	342	240	303	440	589	428	2,342
Return to Duty/Discharge	203	154	222	213	247	216	1,255
Evacuations Out of Country	132	83	59*	206	323	202	1,005
Died in Hospital	7	3	22	21	19	10	82
Daily Beds Occupied**	3,094	3,401	3,829	3,969	3,863	3,941	

- (Note 1) Only Qui Nhon Airfield was open on 31 January 1968
- (Note 2) As of 2400 hours daily
- Abbreviations: IRHA=Injured as a Result off Hostile Action; CWCP=Civilian War Casualty Program

The brigade staff found it interesting to note the difference in the Tet and the May Offensives. During Tet, the enemy penetrated many cities and towns throughout South Vietnam. This action resulted in heavy civilian war casualties in addition to military casualties. Throughout the May Offensive, however, the enemy was unable to penetrate the cities to any great extent. As a result, the ratio of military casualties to civilian casualties was higher and resulted in a greater number of out-of-country evacuations.

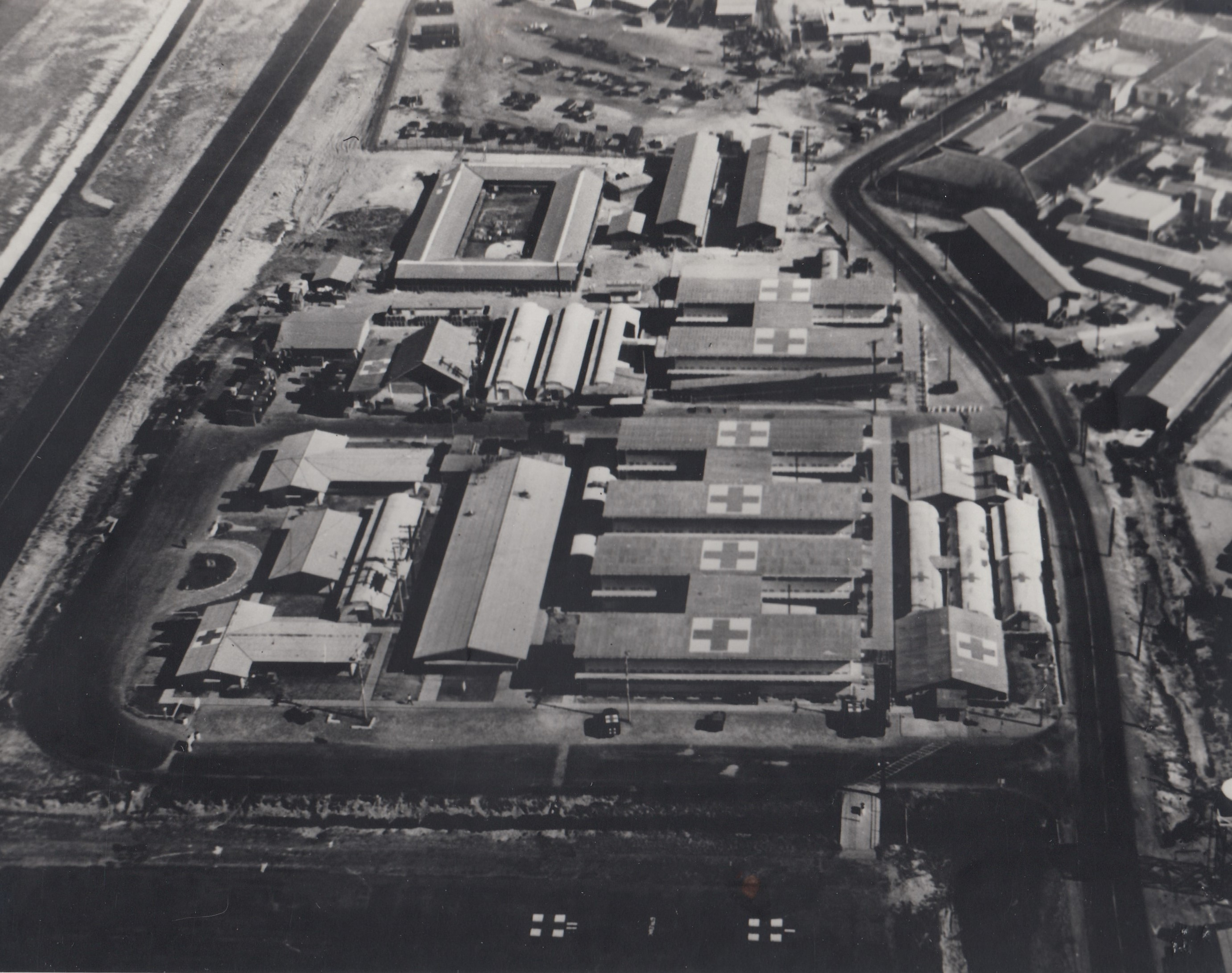
67th Evacuation Hospital, Qui Nhon, Republic of Vietnam, 1967

At the request of the brigade headquarters, the 7th Air Force Surgeon's Office inactivated the 25th Casualty Staging Flight (CSF) at Qui Nhon on 11 July 1968. This CSF had been utilized as a staging area for out-of-country evacuation of patients from the 67th Evacuation Hospital. Evacuation out-of-country from Qui Nhon was disadvantageous because all flights terminated at Clark Air Force Base. where it was necessary for patients regulated to Japan to remain overnight. As a result, patients lost at least one additional day prior to being further evacuated. After the 25th CSF was inactivated, all US military patients from the Qui Nhon area were evacuated to the 26th CSF at Cam Ranh Bay for further evacuation directly to Japan utilizing regularly scheduled Military Airlift Command flights. Korean patients were also evacuated to the 26th CSF for movement to Clark Air Force Base, and further evacuation to Korea. The primary advantages were the elimination of delays en route to destination hospitals and consolidation of out-of-country evacuations at casualty staging facilities serviced on a regular basis by Military Airlift Command flights.

During 1968, the average daily beds occupied by MEDCAP patients throughout the brigade's medical treatment facilities rose from 61 per day in January to 285 per day in December. The brigade observed that as military activities decreased, the number of MEDCAP admissions increased. Civilian War Casualties accounted for approximately 27% of the total patients in brigade facilities. This figure remained fairly stable since April 1968. Following the May Offensive, the number of POWs hospitalized throughout the brigade remained constant at about 400 beds per day.

===== Aeromedical evacuation =====
Aviation activities at the beginning of 1968 were similar to those of 1967. Workload continued to increase slightly with a new high of 12,520 evacuated in January. The Tet Offensive in February substantially increased the workload to 16,885 and the all-time high of 21,915 patients were evacuated by brigade aircraft during the month of May. Workload throughout the remainder of the year was fairly level in the range of 14,000 to 15,000 patients evacuated monthly with the exception of August and September when evacuation rose to nearly 17,000 in each month.

Air ambulance resources available to support the increased workload were two medical companies (air ambulance) located at Long Binh and Qui Nhon, and 8 medical detachments (RA) located at Gia Le, Phu Bi and Chu Lai in the I CTZ, Pleiku and Nha Trang in the II CTZ, Long Binh and Cu Chi in the III CTZ, and Soc Trang in the IV CTZ. With these units, the 44th Medical Brigade was authorized 98 aircraft which provided minimally adequate evacuation support to the theater. On numerous occasions this capability was severely strained and frequently on short notice aircraft and crews were moved from one tactical zone to another to support areas of increased activities. This was especially true in the I CTZ where, because of limited air ambulance coverage, the assets of II CTZ North were repeatedly called upon to provide additional aircraft and crews.

Aircraft maintenance throughout 1968 was generally satisfactory. Minimum acceptable availability was established at 70% and this availability rate was maintained with several exceptions. During February when the number of aircraft damaged by hostile fire doubled, availability rates dropped to 63%, and at times to below 50%. Although the same number of aircraft were damaged by hostile fire during the May Offensive, aircraft availability was maintained at 74%. This high availability was attributed to increased field maintenance responsiveness and the use of float aircraft issued to the air ambulance units by the supporting maintenance activities. The problem of limited resources and large geographic areas to support required field siting of aircraft to support a conflict characterized by small unit engagements at scattered locations. Often as many as 26 aircraft were field sited at 20 locations. Although the field siting of aircraft at sites remote from maintenance facilities created problems, it provided a responsiveness to tactical units that could not be assured by conventional area support.

On 1 July 1968, the 101st Airborne Division was redesignated as an airmobile division. The 50th Medical Detachment (RA), located at Gia Le was assigned to the division and became the nucleus of the air ambulance platoon of the 326th Medical Battalion. The loss of the 50th Medical Detachment (RA) had no adverse effects on the brigade aeromedical evacuation capability because the unit had previously directed the bulk of its resources in support of the 101st Airborne Division.

The arrival in-country of four additional medical detachments (RA) in November and December significantly increased the brigade capability. The addition of these units resulted in the following benefits:

- Permitted a reduction in field site requirements
- Reduced individual aviator flying time
- Increased aircraft availability and
- Obviated the need to shift resources between groups

The new units were distributed as follows:

- The 68th Medical Detachment (RA) to Tuy Hoa
- The 236th Medical Detachment (RA) to Da Nang
- The 237th Medical Detachment (RA)to Camp Evans (Northwest of Hue)
- The 247th Medical Detachment (RA) to Dong Tam

The requirement for a full-time aviation staff officer had long been recognized and the position was requested in an MTOE change submitted in February 1968. Approval was granted by USARPAC General Order Number 812, dated 9 December 1968. In addition to the aviation staff officer, a program was instituted to select and assign a company grade aviator to the brigade as the assistant aviation staff officer for a period of 90 days. The program ensured coverage in the aviation section during the absence of the aviation staff officer and allowed company grade officers an opportunity to gain valuable staff experience. Selection of officers alternated between the various air ambulance units in the brigade.

In May 1968 the brigade was assigned a U-1A Otter fixed wing aircraft. After pilots were trained in May, the Otter became operational in June and proved to be a valuable addition to the brigade's aviation capability. It was used generally for the long-range transportation of medical personnel and critical supplies and equipment. Availability was excellent and utilization high. The Otter averaged 65 hours a month, with its high month being June when 96 hours were logged. At the end of 1968, the brigade was giving serious consideration to including a requirement for a fixed wing aircraft in the next brigade MTOE change submission.

Aeromedical Evacuation Statistics 1968

	January	February	March	April	May	June	July	August	September	October	November	December
Number of Times Hit by Hostile Fire	28	54	28	29	54	25	28	33	44	26	15	22
Number of Hoist Missions (Patients)	107	77	106	312	233	169	100	91	137	115	122	160
Number of Times Hit by Hostile Fire (Hoist Missions)	1	2	0	5	9	1	5	3	3	4	1	1
Number of Crew Killed	0	0	0	1	4	1	1	1	3	9	1	2
Number of Crew Wounded	14	11	4	8	19	2	6	8	12	7	6	10
Number of Patients Killed	0	0	0	0	1	1	0	0	4	7	1	0
Number of Patients Wounded	1	0	0	0	0	0	0	1	0	5	0	0
Number of Aircraft Combat Losses	2	5	3	3	3	0	1	4	5	4	1	2
Total Number of Missions Flown	5,600	6,755	6,545	7,329	8,801	7,437	6,419	7,439	6,938	6,926	6,639	7,530
Total Flight Hours	5,964	5,107	5,448	6,226	6,975	5,690	5,197	6,282	5,188	5,385	5,111	6,103
Number of Patients Evacuated												
U.S. Patients	7,396	9,332	8,540	10,570	11,454	7,179	6,536	7,181	7,108	6,125	5,457	5,836
FWMAF	445	1104	622	526	757	611	502	610	445	362	426	410
ARVN	2,424	3,327	2,951	4,081	5,585	4,466	3,301	5,489	5,707	4,254	3,384	4,298
RVN Civilians	—	—	—	2,390	3,175	2,697	2,550	3,038	2,836	3,523	3,483	3,733
Other	2,255	3,122	2,818	513	944	481	316	597	680	420	528	574
Total	12,520	16,885	14,931	18,080	21,915	15,434	13,205	16,915	16,776	14,684	13,278	D14,851
Average Aircraft on Hand	101	99	101	103	109	110	104	102	102	101	102	112
Average Percentage Aircraft on Hand	70%	63%	73.2%	74%	70%	68%	74%	73%	67%	68%	67%	78%

- (Note 1) RVN Civilians included in "Other" for January–March 1968
- (Note 2) Abbreviations: FWMAF=Free World Military Assistance Forces; ARVN=Army of the Republic of Vietnam

===== Communications =====
The success of the 44th Medical Brigade's mission accomplishment during 1968 was directly related to its communications facilities.

The two primary nets within the brigade were the single side band (SSB) and the Dustoff (medical evacuation) radio nets. A discussion of the systems follows:

1. During 1968 the Department of the Army approved a brigade request for thirty-eight AN/FRC-93 Collins SSB radios. Thirty of these radios were received and utilized in a brigade net and four internal medical group nets. The SSB nets were used primarily in the regulating of patients within the brigade and the exchange of command message traffic. The SSB brigade net allowed the brigade commander to communicate readily with even his most distant units.

2. Dustoff radio nets utilized both FM and UHF radios. The primary FM net was composed of VRC-46s at the local Dustoff control stations and ARC-54s in the aircraft. The primary FM net was used to receive and relay Dustoff missions and for command and control of the aircraft. The UHF net was composed of VRC-24s at the local Dustoff control station and VRC 15s in the aircraft. The UHF net served as the back-up system for the primary FM net. The alternate FM net was utilized to relay information on the type of casualties aboard to the medical groups which in turn directed the aircraft to the appropriate destination hospital.

===== S-2/historian =====
Throughout 1968, the S-2 officer supervised the 44th Medical Brigade personnel security and intelligence program, directed the brigade historical program and was responsible for the preparation of activities and operations reports.

In mid-1968, efforts were undertaken to establish a working relationship between the 521st Medical Detachment (QA), a medical intelligence unit under the Combined Materiel Exploitation Center at MACV and the 44th Medical Brigade. In late December, brigade headquarters hosted a conference which brought together members of the medical intelligence unit, commanders of the brigade prisoner of war hospitals in the 74th Field Hospital on Long Binh Post and the 311th Field Hospital in the Phu Thanh Valley, and brigade headquarters personnel. The result was the establishment of procedures to implement an open-ended study of medical records of VC/NVA prisoners of war who received treatment in US Army medical facilities. Under the study, the prisoner of war hospitals would forward select medical information to the 521st Medical Detachment which in turn would use the data in compiling a study of non-effectiveness among VC/NVA troops.

===== S-4 =====
Throughout 1968, the mission of the brigade S-4 remained essentially unchanged, as follows: To advise and act for the brigade commander, as directed, in all aspects of medical and general supply, maintenance of equipment, transportation and services as pertains to the effective operation of all units assigned or attached to the brigade; to advise, assist and act for the brigade commander, as directed, in all aspects of construction and maintenance of medical facilities occupied or required for all units assigned to the brigade, and to serve as brigade claims officer.

On 5 July 1968, the Staff Dietitian's activities were established as a staff section separate from the S-4. The organization of the S-4 Section again changed on 2 December to include a Brigade MUST Officer for "the purpose of coordinating all matters pertaining to MUST equipped hospitals.

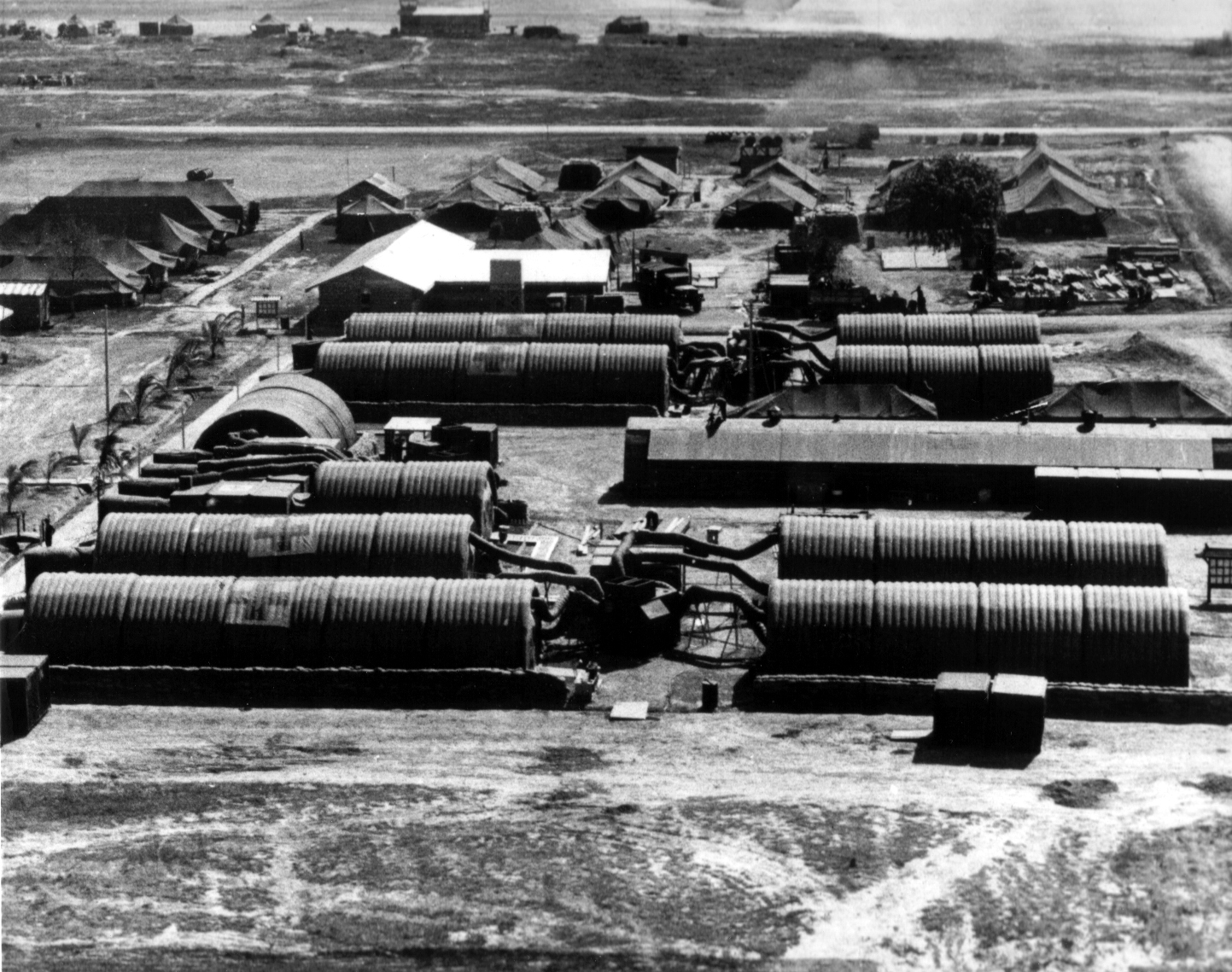
A US Army Surgical Hospital in Vietnam, equipped with MUST (Medical Unit, Self-Contained, Transportable) equipment

The medical supply officer position within the brigade S-4 section was re-established during the March 1968

The medical supply section continued to implement and refine programs that had been initiated during 1967. In addition, several new programs were developed. Among these were the following:

1. Resupply sets (30 day) were developed based on actual demand data from surgical and evacuation hospitals. As new hospitals arrived in-country or were relocated under emergency conditions, the sets were assembled in Okinawa and shipped directly to the unit
2. Mass casualty levels of supply, over and above routine requirements, were established for each hospital. During the Tet and May Offensives, these supplies proved essential to the treatment of casualties
3. Out-of-country activity address codes for all major hospitals were obtained permitting direct emergency shipments from Okinawa or directly from the continental United States

General supply and maintenance support of brigade units was satisfactory throughout the year. Although there were no items or logistic services in chronic short supply, there were shortages of some items at any given time. Stationery and printing supplies, spark plugs and non-medical repair parts for medical equipment were often unavailable. Command assistance in dealing with support units and redistribution of brigade assets generally resolved problems caused by shortages.

During the year the Commanding General, 1st Logistical Command established a program to assist other commanders with critical problems related to support provided by his command. This commander-to-commander program produced excellent results.

Some units with personnel billeted in hotel-type quarters in metropolitan areas experienced a serious shortage of rations and fuel during the Tet Offensive in January. Accordingly, such units subsequently positioned a portion of their basic load of these supplies in their billeting areas.

A vigorous command maintenance program was inaugurated in August 1968. The main thrust of this effort turned on command emphasis and traini.ng. The CMMI team was employed as an instructional activity. During inspections and special maintenance liaison visits, the team instructed commanders and maintenance personnel. The CMMI team completed its initial round of inspections in October. Second round inspections revealed substantial improvement in maintenance throughout the brigade.

One of the principal problems in unit maintenance programs was a lack of knowledge among officers as to the meaning of command responsibility for maintenance. It was a common misunderstanding that the maintenance officer, not the line supervisor, was responsible for supervision of operator maintenance. Command emphasis was directed at correcting that view.

During 1968 an extensive construction program was implemented that was designed to satisfy the current requirements as well as formulate a plan of action for future needs. While it was realized that there was a certain amount of rigidity inherent in any program that was developed on an annual basis, the program was a conscious effort by brigade to be responsive to immediate needs.

Some of the major projects completed in 1968 were:

1. A 10,080 square foot administration building for the brigade headquarters was completed in October 1968
2. The first phase of construction was completed for the three hospitals authorized by the Civilian War Casualty Program; the 27th Surgical Hospital at Chu Lai, the 29th Evacuation Hospital at Can Tho and the 95th Evacuation Hospital at Da Nang. These hospitals became operation in June 1968. Additional construction was planned to add such features as connecting service corridors between wards, additional electrical capability, and a Red Cross building
3. A 26,880 square foot laboratory complex was completed, and the 9th Medical Laboratory assumed occupancy in November 1968. Facilities were also constructed on the same site for the 20th Preventive Medicine Unit which was expected.to assume occupancy in 1669.
4. Six hospital wards, 11,000 square feet, were completed and occupied in September 1968 by the 74th Field Hospital (POW). Latrines and air conditioning for pre-op, post-op and surgery were included in the scope of work
5. A 4,000 square foot metal building was renovated by engineer troops to provide a fourteen-chair dental clinic for the ·650th Medical Detachment. Support systems include air conditioning and water and sewerage distribution systems
6. In May 1968, a Military Construction Army (MCA) project to air condition all patient treatment areas in hospitals was submitted to USARV. The request was approved; however, due to the time required for design, procurement and installation of equipment, it became evident that window air conditioners should be installed as an interim measure for critical areas such as pre-op, post-op, and surgery. A release of MCA funds for the air conditioners could not be obtained. The problem was resolved by obtaining a special grant from the Central Welfare Fund which provided for the purchase of two hundred 10,000 BTU air conditioners from the USARV Po.t Exchange. These units were distributed to the hospitals.

The projected number of medical facilities scheduled for construction in 1969 exceeded that of any previous year in Vietnam. The projects vary from the construction of completely new hospitals to the renovation and up grading of existing facilities. Outlined below are some of the major projects planned for 1969:

1. A 400-bed evacuation hospital at Phu Bai. The hospital would be constructed by the 32d Naval Construction Regiment. Completion of the hospital is scheduled for October 1969
2. Upgrading of an existing cantonment site for the 18th Surgical Hospital was underway at Camp Evans. The hospital (MUST) moved to the site and became operational on l January 1969
3. A project to remove the MUST equipment from three hospitals, the 3d, 45th and 22d Surgical Hospitals was underway. The designs for

the permanent facilities to replace MUST equipment were in various phases of completion

1. A new veterinary clinic with dog kennels for the 245th Medical Detachment and a veterinary hospital for the 936th Medical Detachment were programmed for completion in 1969
2. An extensive program for new construction and renovation was in progress at the 6th Convalescent Center. Included in the scope of the work were the following: complete renovation of the mess hall, to include additions to the food service area, physical therapy building, gymnasium, latrines, sewage disposal system and area lighting throughout the compound. The project was scheduled for completion in June 1969
3. The 32d Medical Depot, Cam Ranh Bay and its advanced depots at Long Binh; Qui Nhon and Phu Bai were scheduled to receive major new construction during 1969
4. Completion of a new hospital for the 311th Field Hospital (POW) at Phu Thanh
5. There were numerous supply buildings, medical maintenance facilities, BOQ and BEQ programmed for various hospitals in 1969

Programs for construction in 1970 were being formulated at the end of 1968. It appeared that the major emphasis would be on upgrading and renovation rather than construction of new facilities. The basic and fundamental construction requirements relating to patient care were being met and continued to receive the highest priority of all construction projects.

===== Staff dietitian =====
The mission of the staff dietitian remained unchanged throughout 1968 as "to be responsible for the food service program within the medical brigade; to supervise and to provide staff direction to food services and food service personnel for all elements of the brigade; provide supervision and guidance for food service programs to all elements of the brigade.

Authorization for a dietitian (MOS 3420) in the Office of the Surgeon, USARV became effective 5 August 1968. The dietitian was assigned to the Professional Services Division as the USARV dietetic consultant with the additional duty of staff dietitian, 44th Medical Brigade.

Although only two dietitians were authorized in the 44th Medical Brigade, there were five dietitians assigned during 1968. The dietitians were assigned as staff dietitians in each of the four medical groups. This number of dietitians equalized the workload in the supervision of food service activities in 32 medical units in the 44th Medical Brigade. Due to the large number of medical units in the 68th Medical Group, two dietitians were assigned to supervise food service activities in that medical group.

During the first quarter of 1968, a severe shortage of food service advisors or technicians existed in medical units. Only 6 of the 14 warrant officers authorized were assigned. At the end of 1968 the authorized strength of 18 warrant officers (MOS 941A) was realized. Since the warrant officers lacked experience in hospital food service, it was necessary to institute an orientation and training program for those officers. Initial orientation was conducted by the brigade dietitian upon the arrival of each food service advisor or technician in-country C, Further training was continued by the medical group staff dietitian upon assignment to a hospital. As for the end of this reporting period, the authorized number of 55 hospital mess stewards (MOS 94F40) were assigned to medical treatment facilities in Vietnam.

During 1968, the brigade staff dietitian reviewed, analyzed and evaluated space design and layouts for upgrading present medical food service facilities and planning new mess facilities for future medical units. Recommendations were made to the construction engineers. Dietitians were also tasked with the project of locating cantonment (now called garrison) mess equipment in the various depots and processing correspondence to secure the items to be installed in field ration messes in hospitals.

On liaison visits to hospitals the staff dietitian observed that the majority of the incoming enlisted personnel assigned to hospital messes lacked experience in food preparation and service and were unfamiliar with hospital feeding. Also, supervisory personnel lacked experience and knowledge in hospital food service and were therefore unable to give the proper guidance and super11ision in the operation of patient feeding. The TO&E change authorizing hospital food service personnel and the arrival in-country of these personnel resulted in an improvement in modified diet preparation and ward food service to patients.

The staff dietitian made1 37 staff visits to medical treatment facilities. Emphasis was placed on mess hall sanitation, space design and layout, procurement of garrison mess equipment training of cooks in preparation and service with particular emphasis on patient feeding on the ward, training or local Vietnamese national (LVN) personnel, mess management and administration standard hospital diets, procurement of supplemental foods and beverages for patient feeding, and organization of mess operation in the utilization of MOS 94F40 personnel.

Five visits were made to mess facilities of the Free World Military Armed Forces to lend assistance with the garrison mess equipment program. Hospitals visited included the Republic of Korea Army hospitals in Vung Tau and Qui Nhon and the Australian hospital in Vung Tau. Permission was given by the medical group commanders, in the areas in which these hospitals were located, to permit the staff dietitians of the groups to give assistance to the hospital personnel on their regular consult visits in the area.

Plans for the renovation of the 6th Convalescent Center mess hall were completed and approved. The construction was scheduled to be completed in the first quarter of 1969. The equipment was replaced with garrison mess equipment.

The installation of equipment in the mess hall constructed at the 93d Evacuation Hospital in 1967 was completed in May 1968.

Space design and layout for the renovation and enlargement of the mess hall of the Jd Field Hospital in Saigon was, in the planning stage at the end of 1968.

During 1968, TO&E equipment was replaced with garrison mess equipment in all medical units within the 44th Medical Brigade except for those field ration messes in the I Corps Tactical Zone.

Most equipment for the medical units in the I Corps Tactical Zone was located in the Saigon, Cam Ranh and Qui Nhon Support Commands and with the assistance of the personnel at the 32d Medical Depot, the equipment was in the process of being shipped to Chu Lai and Da Nang at the end of 1968.

Two renovation or upgrading projects were accomplished for the field ration mess at the 29th Evacuation Hospital in Can Tho. Due to non-availability of garrison mess equipment in the Da Nang Support Command, the upgrading of the mess hall at the 27th Surgical Hospital in Chu Lai and the 95th Evacuation Hospital in Da Nang was not completed during 1968.

Design and layout plans were completed for the mess hall of the 311th Field Hospital (POW) in Phu Thanh and construction began in September 1968.

Standard Hospital Diets: 44th Medical Brigade Pamphlet 30-1 was published on 8 September 1968. This pamphlet included the type and general description and approximate dietary analysis of diets available.

28 Day Master Hospital Menu: 44th Medical Brigade Pamphlet 30-2 contains the regular hospital diet based on the Department of the Army Supply Bulletin SB10-261 and the 14 modified diets most frequently ordered by medical and dental corps officers in hospitals throughout the command.

The USARV medical treatment facilities subsisted on the field ration menu as established for all troops in RVN. Supplemental foods and beverages were ma.de available for issue through Class I facilities for patients on modified diets according to 44th Medical Brigade Pamphlet 30-2. Combat troops and hospital patients had priority for issue of fresh food items. The support and management of the entire subsistence program by 1st Logistical Command was commendable throughout 1968.

The 28 Day Master Menu, SB10-261, dated 6 May 1968, was made available to field ration messes in II, III, and IV CTZ, to include hospitals, on 8 September 1968. Problems existed in subsistence supply to hospitals in I Corps Tactical Zone due to support by the US Navy. A master menu was not available to hospitals serviced by the Navy which resulted in daily planning of menus after the food arrived in the units. In addition, most fresh fruits and vegetables were not made available to US Army Units through the US Navy during the first five months of the year. Since that time, the 1st Logistical Command solved this problem by shipping fresh fruits and vegetables from Dalat to units in I CTZ.

Carbonated beverages were made available to post-operative patients through the local Post Exchange facilities which in turn billed US Army Procurement Agency, Vietnam.

A recommendation by the International Red Cross to purchase Nuoc Mam (fish sauce) £or POW patients in Vietnam was extended to Vietnamese patients in all hospitals. Local purchase of the sauce for each hospital was approved and was in the process of being procured at the end of 1968.

During the year units of the Medical Brigade served a total of approximately 4,000,000 rations. Of these 1,700,000 were patient rations. Modified diets comprised approximately 9% of patients' rations.

The starring guide utilized by Headquarters, USARV for the hiring of local Vietnamese National (LVN) personnel as mess attendants in the field ration messes in RVN presented a hardship to hospitals. The formula, allowing one LVN for the first 40 persons served and one employee for each 40 thereafter, was applied theater wide to messes without regard to the vastly different functions of hospital feeding. Several of the evacuation and field hospital messes were serving 650 - 700 rations per day including up to 200 bed patients with a total or 38 - 40 authorized military and civilian personnel. Other than the use of compartmented trays in lieu of China, the type of service, the menus ("A" rations) and the food service equipment were not markedly different from that found at the CONUS hospitals which would be staffed at least 100% higher. Recommendations, justification and job descriptions to obtain an increased authorization for local national employees for food service to patients of the wards were submitted and action was pending at the end of the reporting period.

Transporting and service of food to the ward bed patients continued to be a problem for food service personnel in RVN. Bulk food carts presently in the medical supply system were a satisfactory food transporting system only for those hospitals having covered ramps and cement walkways to wards. In the MUST units, the bulk food cart could not be rolled into wards due to the two high sills located at the entrance ways. Additionally, these hospitals were usually placed on terrain where hard surface walkways were unavailable which also eliminated the use of mobile food carts. Since the introduction of the "A Ration" into the supply system in Vietnam on 8 September 1968, a new problem was experienced due to the lack of sufficient space on the bulk food cart for hot and cold food for bed patients.

===== Nursing services =====
The mission of the brigade chief nurse was to advise the brigade commander on all aspects of the nursing service program within the command; coordinate overall nursing service activities; supervise and provide staff direction in professional matters pertinent to nursing service to all elements within the command.

A total of 51 staff visits were made during the first quarter of 1968, 103 during 2d quarter, 46 during 3d quarter and 70 during 4th quarter. Emphasis was made on staffing needs, career guidance and standards of patient care.

During the 3d quarter of 1968, a Chief Nurses Conference was held in each medical group with chief nurses of Navy, Air Force, Australian and Korean Hospitals in Vietnam as guests.

Beginning the 3d quarter of 1968, monthly meetings of the chief nurses in the I CTZ were conducted with US Army, Air Force and Navy chief nurses attending. The meetings were held at various installations and mutual problems were discussed. One result was the exchange or Navy Nurse Corps and Air Force Nurse Corps officers for a 2-week period between a surgical hospital and a Navy hospital ship.

During the 4th quarter, a Nursing Conference was conducted in Saigon on 20 October and again on 17 December 19&80. Nursing consultants assigned to the MACV Surgeon's Office the Chief Nurse of the Ministry of Health — Government of Vietnam, Nursing Consultant with the nursing Branch of the US Agency for International Development, the Chief Nurse of the Republic of Korea Forces in Vietnam, the Chief Nurse of the Air Force Casualty Staging Facility and the Chief Nurse USARV/44th Medical Brigade attended. Monthly meetings are planned in an effort to coordinate the programs of all agencies toward improving the profession of nursing in Vietnam.

A total of seven units arrived in-country during 1968. Three of the units were reserve units and a total of ten nurses arrived with their respective units. The professional complement of all units was made up or active-duty fillers. A small cadre was kept for each unit, with the majority of officers being reassigned to other units in-country. The assignment of officers who had already adjusted to the situation in Vietnam made it possible for the new units to carry out their mission more rapidly and effectively.

MTOE authorizations were received for the 8th Field Hospital and the 6th Convalescent Center. These authorizations combined the 8th, 9th and 523d Hospital Units and authorized a chief nurse for this facility. The 6th Convalescent Center had been operating with 12 ANC officers but did not have any authorizations.

The living quarters for Army Nurse Corps officers throughout the command varied from tents to tropical buildings, to villas and trailers. Major difficulties were experienced by various units in obtaining items of furniture, such as chests of drawers, mirrors, washing machines, dryers, etc.; however, progress was made in resolving these shortages.

The requirements for nurse anesthetists increased because of the change in type of patients admitted to the medical facilities in Vietnam and because of the additional medical units. The shortages of nurse anesthetists throughout the uniformed services was cause for concern and special effort was being made to analyze retention and training factors.

==== 1969 ====
===== Mission and functions =====
Throughout 1969, the mission of the 44th Medical Brigade was to provide medical service support to United States Army personnel, Free World Military Assistance Forces personnel, and other categories of personnel as directed, and to provide hospitalization, medical and surgical care to Vietnamese civilians injured as a result of hostile action.

The 29 specified functions of the brigade remained unchanged from 1967 and 1968.

===== Organization of groups and major subordinate units =====
The year 1969 was a period of reorganization, consolidation, and realignment for 44th Medical Brigade units. A major consolidation of medical groups occurred on 15 June 1969 when the 55th Medical Group was reduced to zero strength and equipment status. The 43d Medical Group assumed command and control of all 55th Medical Group units. At the end of 1969, the majority of 44th Medical Brigade units were deployed by geographical area under the control of three medical groups: The 67th Medical Group in I Corps Tactical Zone (CTZ) with headquarters at Da Nang, the 43d Medical Group in II CTZ with headquarters at Nha Trang, and the 68th Medical Group responsible for medical care in III and IV CTZs with headquarters at Long Binh.

During 1969 the 20th Preventive Medicine Unit and the 172d Preventive Medicine Unit were removed from the direct control of the brigade headquarters and reassigned along with their subordinate units to medical groups.

===== S-1 =====
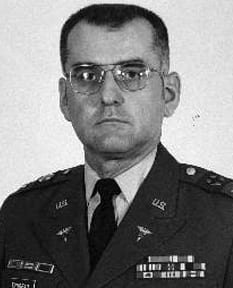
Lieutenant Colonel Thomas L. Trudeau, MSC, became the 44th Medical Brigade S-1 on 24 March 1969. As a Colonel, he would assume command of the brigade at then-Fort Bragg, North Carolina in December 1977

On 1 January 1969, the S-1 section consisted of an S-1 and five commissioned branch chiefs: officer personnel, enlisted personnel, manpower control, morale and welfare, and the Information Office. Ten enlisted personnel were also assigned.

With the arrival of an Adjutant General Corps (AG) Reenlistment Officer on 31 January, the Reenlistment Branch was established. The branch consisted of the reenlistment officer; two career counselors were assigned to, and worked from, the 222d Personnel Service Company.

In April 1969, an assistant S-1 was appointed from within the section. The assistant S-1 also serves as the Chief, Manpower Control Branch.

In April 1969, Headquarters and Headquarters Detachment of the brigade and the 658th Medical Detachment (Augmentation) (both commanded by the same officer) were placed under the supervision of the S-1. They had previously been responsible directly to the brigade executive officer.

By June 1969, it became evident that the duties and responsibilities of the enlisted personnel branch were duplicating and overlapping those of the 222d Personnel Services Company. The enlisted personnel branch was discontinued.

Weekly liaison trips to subordinate units continued throughout the year by the S-1 and his staff on a regularly scheduled basis. These visits proved to be most effective, especially during the second half of the year, as eleven units were redeployed and ten others were inactivated in 1969.

At the beginning of the year the S-1 was also the acting inspector general for the brigade; however, in April 1969 the S-1 was relieved of this responsibility based on the recommendation of both the USARV Inspector General and the departing S-1.

The brigade became involved in the troop withdrawal in July. Personnel and administrative functions involved in the redeployment or inactivation of units of the brigade were the responsibility of this section and were closely monitored by the S-1.

Included in the first withdrawal beginning in July and continuing into August were all National Guard and US Army Reserve medical units which had been activated in 1968. These included the 312th Evacuation Hospital, the 74th and 311th Field Hospitals, and eight smaller units, such as medical detachments and a dental KJ team. One of the many administrative requirements involved in the redeployment of these particular units was that of the return of all National Guard and US Army Reserve personnel to the redeploying unit:

- In 1968, on arrival of those units in-country, a complete infusion program was started, the object being that not more than 15% of any one unit would rotate in any given month. This program was completed in early 1969
- With the requirement that all National Guard and US Army Reserve personnel be returned to CONUS with the unit they were mobilized and deployed with, a complete reversal of the infusion program was required. The original personnel of the Units had to be identified and reassigned from other units, not only within the brigade but throughout USARV to their original units. This was accomplished and all personnel were redeployed with their units

The strength of the brigade, both military and civilian, continued to rise during the first six months of 1969, but in July, with the beginning of redeployment, coupled with a hiring freeze on local national personnel imposed in May, a downward trend began.

The strength of the command as of 1 January 1969 was 10,468 assigned personnel. The strength of the command as of 31 December 1969 was 9,901.

A personnel status of particular importance during the year was the initiation of projected requisitioning authorities.

Personnel status, 1969

1 January 1969				31 December 1969		
		Authorized	Assigned	Authorized	PRA	Assigned
Officers		2,504	2,129	2,082	1,998	1,883
	Medical Corps	760	532	589	505	476
	Medical Service Corps	480	496	430	443	399
	Dental Corps	249	223	215	214	234
	Veterinary Corps	54	55	50	47	51
	Army Nurse Corps	928	782	766	752	683
	Army Medical Specialist Corps	1	15	6	16	14
	Chaplain Corps	27	25	21	21	20
	Adjutant General	3	1	5	0	1
	Chemical Corps					1*
	Transportation Corps					2**
	Infantry					2**
Warrant Officers		198	170	194	194	163
Enlisted		7,670	6,889	6,252	6,089	5,780
Civilians		1,616	1,280	1,181	1,181	1,185
TOTAL		11,989	10,468	9,709	9,462	9,011

- (Note 1) PRA=Projected Requisitioning Authority
- (Note 2) *=Chemist assigned to the 20th Preventive Medicine Unit
- (Note 3) **=Assigned as aviators in Dustoff units

Program 6 continued until a peak authorization of 465 spaces was reached on 30 June 1969. This program was a civilianization plan where military spaces were replaced by local national civilians on the basis of 1.5 civilian to 1 military. In general, this program had not been effective; the reduction of 317 military spaces which was imposed by Headquarters USARV required replacement by MOS and job description, and the availability of adequately trained local nationals was insufficient to meet these requirements. The actual assigned strength versus authorized strength under this program varied from 50 to 70 percent during the year.

The responsibility for conducting medical training classes for local national personnel was transferred to the Civilian Training Institute at Long Binh. Classes were graduated in March and May 1969; the hiring freeze precluded further classes.

In the spring of 1969, a shortage of company grade Medical Service Corps officers in MOS 3506 (Field Medical Assistant) developed. No officers in this MOS arrived during the months of March, April, and May. Due to redeployment and inactivation of units, the brigade gained sufficient MSC officers assigned and was able to in some cases, cancel requisitions, especially for field grade officers.

A shortage of Army Nurse Corps (ANC) officers continued throughout the year. In March 1969, the brigade commanding general granted the group commanders authority to assign and reassign ANC officers within their respective groups, requiring only coordination with the office of the chief nurse.

Group commanders retained the authority for assignment of Medical Corps (MC) officers, but in October, because of a developing shortage, the Medical, Surgical and neuropsychiatric consultants were granted authority to assign in oncoming MC officers (except MOS 3100—General Medical Officer) directly to hospitals and to monitor and control all reassignments of MC officers. A severe shortage existed throughout the year in MOS 3131 (Neurosurgeon).

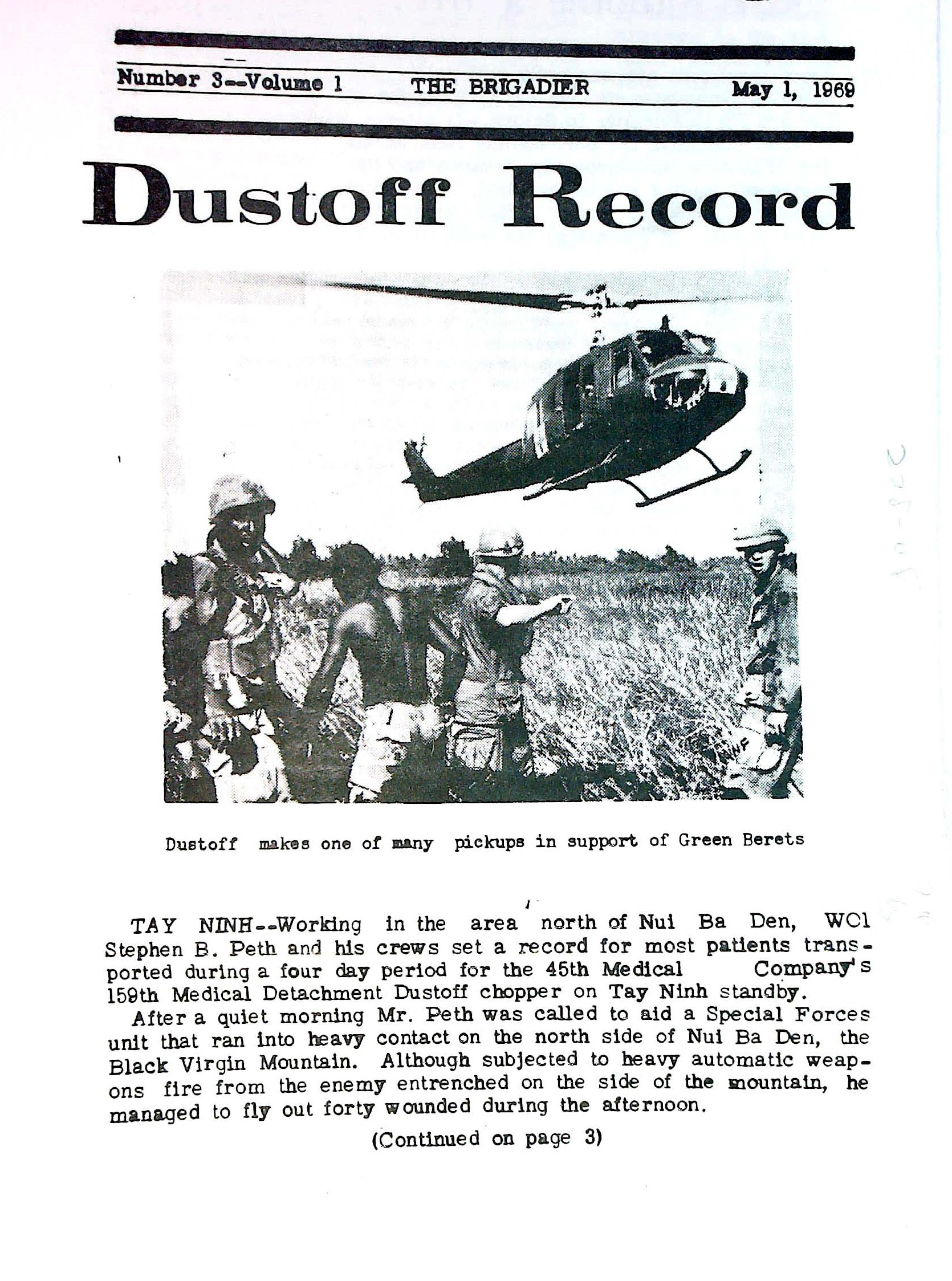
Cover of the May 1969 (volume 1, issue 3) issue of "The 44th Brigadier," the monthly newspaper of the 44th Medical Brigade

In March 1969, the information office began publication of a unit newspaper, "The 44th Brigadier." The paper was printed by the 222d Personnel Services Company. It was in multilith format, and is length varied from 10 to 14 pages. The primary purpose of this newspaper was to provide a means of exchanging information about brigade units located throughout RVN, from the DMZ to the delta. It also included the important function of providing command information.

Also published by the information office during the year were two handbooks, "Guide for Information Officers" and "Guide to the Army Hometown News Release Program. The purpose of these publications was to provide necessary guidance to individuals who performed the information function as an additional duty within their particular units, but who have little background training in the information field.

During the last two months of 1969, the information office began more extensive work in the area of television news coverage. One Command Information show was made by AFVN concerning the CHAMPUS program. Others were planned in the areas of mental hygiene consultation service, rabies, and accident prevention.

On 24 December 1969, representatives from United Press International made a film of a Christmas party held at an orphanage in Tan Heip, Vietnam. This party was sponsored by the staff of the 93d Evacuation Hospital. The film was to be shown nationwide in the United States.

During 1969, the morale and welfare branch continued to supervise and administer the following brigade programs:

- Awards Non-appropriated Funds Safety
- Special Services
- Savings
- General Educational Development

The awards program underwent considerable revision during 1969. In 1968 the average time elapsed from the date of receipt of a recommendation for a meritorious service award to the date the award element were forwarded to the individual concerned had been five to six weeks. By streamlining all phases of awards processing this time has been reduced to an average of ten to fourteen days, without sacrificing a high degree of evaluation and without additional personnel. Only those awards which had to be forwarded to Headquarters, USARV for approval required longer than two weeks for processing.

During 1969, ten Meritorious Unit Commendations were awarded to brigade units. Twenty-one Meritorious Unit Commendation recommendations were submitted during the year and were still pending at the end of the year.

Decorations awarded by month

Month	AM	AM w/V	ARCOM	ARCOM w/V	BSM	BSM w/V	Purple Hearts*	Total less Purple Hearts
January	371	9	140	1	66	1	1,761	588
February	1,415	7	199	5	58	1	1,918	1,685
March	869	8	203	4	79	4	1,692	1,167
April	788	6	178	2	67	2	1,620	1,043
May	153	22	184	3	92	1	2,924	455
June	317	10	230	6	106	1	2,393	670
July	414	5	247	1	148	2	1,457	817
August	53	20	109	5	49	6	1,687	242
September	260	15	213	2	105	3	1,344	598
October	979	14	125	5	116	3	958	1,242
November	1,299	12	222	3	120	1	1,221	1,657
December	50	28	172	1	131	11	905	393
Total	6,968	156	2,222	38	1,137	36	19,880	10,557

- (Note 1) Included in these figures are Purple Hearts awarded by hospital commanders to patients
- (Note 2) Abbreviation: AM=Air Medal; ARCOM=Army Commendation Medal; BSM=Bronze Star Medal; w/V=awarded for Valor

The 222d Personnel Services Company provided support to, approximately 150 separate medical units and processed an average of 700-750 individuals into and out of Vietnam each month during 1969. The total number of records maintained during the year averaged approximately 9,000. The 222d Personnel Services Company Headquarters at Long Binh Post controlled four separate personnel service teams which, until May 1969 were located at Long Binh, Nha Trang, Qui Nhon, and Da Nang. On 31 May 1969, the team at Qui Nhon was inactivated and the records maintained by this team were added to the team at Nha Trang. On 1 July 1969 an additional team was created and stationed at Cam Ranh Bay to support the 32d Medical Depot, and the 39th, 518th, 437th and the 176th Medical Detachments. Team A supported the 68th Medical Group and all non-group units in the III and IV Corps Tactical Zones, Team B supported the 43d Medical Group and the 934th Medical Detachment (KJ). Team C supported the 67th Medical Group and all non-group units in I Corps Tac tical Zone. The Adjutant General Office, Administrative Section, Data Processing Branch, and the Headquarters unit are stationed at Long Binh Post.

Unit strength on 31 December 1969 was:

	Authorized	Actual
Officers	4	7
Warrant Officers	3	2
Enlisted	167	170

The commander of the 222d Personnel Services Company served as adjutant general of the 44th Medical Brigade. The 222d Personnel Services Company was commanded and staffed by Medical Service Corps officers and Adjutant General Corps (AG) officers. This was in contrast to other personnel services companies which were staffed solely by AG officers. It was felt that this staffing provided the commanders of all supported units with staff personnel officers who better understood the medical mission and who were more capable of responding more efficiently and expeditiously to the needs of the command.

During July 1969, the 222d Personnel Services Company assumed responsibility for preparation of morning reports of all units of the 44th Medical Brigade. This enabled the company to provide the commanders more reliable data and more accurate reports and records. Renewed emphasis on the accuracy of information obtained through the PERMACAP system and the use of the personnel information roster as an output of the 1002 computer were key points in improving the overall operations. As a result, the efforts of the 222d Personnel Services Company effected an error rate which was lower than any other major subordinate command of USARV util1zing the PERMACAP system. In June 1969, a brigade courier run, provided by the 222d Personnel Services Company, was expanded to include Nha Trang and Cam Ranh Bay. Through this system, the Commander and staff of the 44th Medical Brigade were capable of communicating with subordinate commanders within a matter of hours, with a more expeditious processing and distribution of all special orders. In November 1969, the 222d Personnel Services Company initiated a program of meeting all incoming Army Medical Department (AMEDD) officers at the 90th Replacement Battalion. This program involved reception of the officers by an enlisted representative of the 222d Personnel Services Company and escorting the officers to the USARV Surgeon's Office for interview and during their processing at the 90th Replacement Battalion. This procedure enabled most AMEDD officers to be on station at their unit of assignment within 24 hours after arrival at the 90th Replacement Battalion.

===== S-3 =====
The mission of the brigade S-3 section remained essentially unchanged throughout 1969. The four-part mission as stated in Medical Brigade Memo 10-1, dated 9 June 1969 was as follows:

1. Formulate plans and directives to implement the policies of the brigade commander and exercise staff supervision over activities pertaining to medical plans, operations, training, aeromedical evacuation operations, medical regulating operations and intelligence relating to units assigned or attached to the brigade
2. Provide technical and administrative guidance to subordinate commanders on the operation of medical facilities under their command
3. Collect, evaluate, interpret and consolidate medical data from assigned and/or attached medical units
4. Collect, evaluate, and disseminate intelligence information as appropriate.

The S-3 section was divided into five major sub-sections: Plans, Operations, S-2, Medical Regulating, and. Aviation. 'The communications element, formerly the responsibility of the Aviation subsection, was transferred to Operations and is supervised by the Assistant Operations Officer who also served as the Brigade Communications Officer.

===== S-3 operations =====
The year 1969 could rightly be divided into four distinct periods. The first half of the year was a period of relative stability, some scaling down of medical activities but then an upswing in May as the result of the enemy's summer offensive. The second period of the year began with the first major troop reduction as the result of President Nixon's announcement. This exercise was designated Operation Keystone Eagle and the following 44th Medical Brigade units were redeployed to the Continental United States:

Unit	Location	Date
650th Medical Detachment (KJ)**	Long Binh	15 July 1969
305th Medical Detachment (KB)*	Chu Lai	1 August 1969
312th Evacuation Hospital*	Chu Lai	1 August 1969
313th Medical Detachment (KA)*	Phu Bai	1 August 1969
378th Medical Detachment (KE)*	Chu Lai	1 August 1969
472d Medical Detachment (RB)*	Chu Lai	1 August 1969
889th Medical Detachment (KA)*	Chu Lai	1 August 1969
311th Field Hospital*	Phu Thanh	7 August 1969
316th Medical Detachment (NC)*	Saigon	13 August 1969
74th Field Hospital*	Long Binh	13 August 1969
482d Medical Detachment (GD)*	Cam Ranh Bay	12 September 1969

- (Note 1) *=US Army Reserve unit called to active duty
- (Note 2) **=National Guard unit called to Active Federal Service

The third period began with Operation Keystone Cardinal which was Phase II of the troop reduction program in Vietnam. Lessons learned from Keystone Eagle contributed to a more effective troop displacement during Phase II.

Personnel turbulence and logistical implications, primarily involving the disposition of equipment, remained the major problems in redeployment activities.

The following 44th Medical Brigade units were inactivated as a result of the Phase II troop reduction:

Unit	Location	Date
22d Surgical Hospital	Phu Bai	18 October 1969
29th Evacuation Hospital	Can Tho (Binh Thuy)	22 October 1969
520th Medical Company (Clearing)	Chu Lai	26 October 1969
45th Medical Detachment (KB)	Long Binh	30 October 1969
202d Medical Detachment (MA)	Long Binh	1 November 1969
541st Medical Detachment (MA)	Long Binh	3 November 1969
240th Medical Detachment (KF)	Pleiku	7 November 1969
245th Medical Detachment (JB)	Long Binh	13 November 1969
74th Medical Battalion	Chu Lai	15 November 1969
36th Evacuation Hospital	Vung Tau	25 November 1969

The fourth period of the year began after Keystone Cardinal and essentially was a period of tranquility while the remaining units of the brigade prepared for the next announcement by President Nixon which would trigger Phase III in 1970.

The year 1969 was a period of transition. In addition to units affected by the Keystone activities, other units were relocated in-country in order to balance the alignment of medical support in Vietnam. Most of the activity took place during the latter half of the year with the following major relocations being executed.

Unit	From	To	Date
82d Medical Detachment (RA)	Soc Trang	Binh Thuy	12 March 1969
7th Medical Detachment (MA)	Cam Ranh Bay	An Khe	27 June 1969
91st Evacuation Hospital	Phu Heip	Chu Lai	1 July 1969
68th Medical Detachment (RA)	Phu Heip	Chu Lai	1 July 1969
17th Field Hospital	An Khe	Phu Thahn	10 July 1969
126th Medical Detachment (OA)	Phu Heip	Long My	15 July 1969
440th Medical Detachment (RD)	Phu Heip	Nha Trang	15 July 1969
138th Medical Detachment (KE)	Qui Nhon	Chu Lai	1 August 1969
359th Medical Detachment (IE)	Dong Tam	Chu Lai	2 August 1969
926th Medical Detachment (LB)	Chu Lai	Qui Nhon	6 August 1969
137th Medical Detachment (KJ)	Dong Tam	Long Binh	15 August 1969
172d Preventive Medicine Unit	An Khe	Da Nang	20 August 1969
616th Medical Company (Clearing)	Phu Bai	Chu Lai	1 September 1969
3d Flight Platoon, 45th Medical Company (Air Ambulance)	Vung Tau	Long Binh	1 September 1969
247th Medical Detachment (RA)	Dong Tam	Vung Tau	2 September 1969
61st Medical Detachment (LB)	Dong Tam	Bien Hoa	2 September 1969
3d Surgical Hospital	Dong Tam	Can Tho	5 September 1969
7th Medical Detachment (MA)	An Khe	Phu Thanh	25 October 1969
17th Field Hospital	Phu Thanh	An Khe	7 November 1969
872d Medical Detachment (RB)	Vung Tau	Long Binh	10 November 1969
500th Medical Detachment (RB)	Camp Evans	Quang Tri	23 November 1969
237th Medical Detachment (RA)	Camp Evans	Quang Tri	23 November 1969
247th Medical Detachment (RA)	Vung Tau	Phan Rang	23 November 1969
20th Preventive Medicine Unit	Bien Hoa	Long Binh	24 November 1969
61st Medical Detachment (LB)	Bien Hoa	Long Binh	26 November 1969
18th Surgical Hospital	Camp Evans	Quang Tri	28 November 1969

In the area of training, during the period 16 – 21 October 1969, the 2d Surgical Hospital conducted a test of the mobility of MUST equipment under combat conditions. The test involved the temporary relocation of one air inflatable shelter, one expandable, one utility pack and other MUST peculiar equipment from Lai Khe to Di An. Upon completion of the test, the following observations were made:

1. Removing MUST components from permanently revetmented areas over concrete pads by forklift is time consuming and could possibly damage the components
2. After being placed in a static situation for a prolonged period of time, many small movable parts of expandables and ward boxes became rusted and ceased to function properly
3. It would be extremely difficult, if not impossible, to set up the MUST unit in total darkness and under blackout conditions unless all personnel were specially trained for that situation
4. With the rapid turnover of personnel, desired proficiency in packing, marking and erecting the MUST unit cannot be maintained
5. It was felt that the recommended time (1/2 hour) to erect one inflatable and one expandable is impractical because of the fixed status of the unit and inability of personnel to become proficient in this exercise. A period of one hour is more reasonable.
6. The lesson learned from this exercise was that a surgical hospital (MUST) is capable of relocating a portion of its facilities to a new site and becoming operational while it continues to operate the base element.

As the US effort in the Republic of Vietnam has shifted to improvement and modernization of Republic of Vietnam Armed Forces (RVNAF), brigade units have become involved in on-the-job training for RVNAF units. The purpose of this training is to teach new skills or upgrade existing ones. The programs conducted are ones that are not normally available or are beyond the capabilities of the RVNAF school system. The following is a list of OJT programs which have been conducted by brigade units and the type of training provided:

Unit	Type of training
2d Surgical Hospital	General Surgery
3d Field Hospital	Supervisory Course in Operating Room CMS
3d Field Hospital	Operating Room Nurses
8th Field Hospital	General Surgery
9th Medical Laboratory	Clinical Lab Officers
12th Evacuation Hospital	General Surgery
27th Surgical Hospital	General Surgery
29th Evacuation Hospital	General Surgery
70th Medical Battalion	Medical Aidman
91st Evacuation Hospital	Neurosurgery and Radiology

- (Note 1) CMS=Central Materiel Services (sterile supplies)

===== S-3 plans =====
The primary area of planning during 1969 was centered around Keystone Eagle and Keystone Cardinal Intensive planning conferences were held prior to implementation of both redeployment phases. A major working document was published by the brigade headquarters on 20 September 1969 as Operations Plan 183-69. This plan was designed for Keystone Cardinal but was written to allow changes for subsequent redeployment actions. The CG, USARV appointed a USARV Redeployment Assistance Team (URAT) to assist smaller units in the necessary roll-up activities for units redeploying from Vietnam. A member of the brigade headquarters accompanied the team when it visited medical units.

Several contingency plans were updated during the year as the result of changes in the brigade force structure. One major plan involved the rapid deployment of two surgical hospitals (MUST). During the year several surgical hospitals turned in their MUST equipment to depot stocks. This action occurred when the hospitals relocated to fixed type facilities vacated by other redeploying hospitals.

A comprehensive study was completed in early summer 1969 regarding several major command and control elements of the brigade. Of the four medical groups, two were located in II CTZ; the 43rd and 55th Medical Groups, respectively. It was felt as a result of this study that one group could adequately provide command and control over brigade units in II CTZ. The 55th Medical Group was brought to zero personnel and equipment status. The remaining group, the 43rd Medical Group was selected primarily because of its proximity to the major tactical command in II CTZ, namely I Field Force, Vietnam.

===== POW hospitals =====
At the beginning of 1969, two hospitals were functioning solely in the capacity of POW hospitals; the 74th Field Hospital in Long Binh for POWs generated in III and IV CTZ and the 311th Field Hospital in Qui Nhon for POWs generated in I and II CTZ. When these US Army Reserve units redeployed in Keystone Eagle, their missions were assumed by the 50th Medical Company (Clearing) and the 17th Field Hospital, respectively. The professional complement for the Long Binh POW hospital (50th Medical Company) was provided by the 24th Evacuation Hospital, which was co-located with the POW facility. On 7 October 1969, new policies for the medical care and/or disposition of prisoners of war and detainees were established at a MACV sponsored Joint Services Conference. In essence, POWs and detainees in custody of US Forces, if admitted to US hospitals would be retained and treated only until their Military Intelligence classification had been completed and their medical condition stabilized to a point permitting transfer to an appropriate Government of Vietnam facility. The POW census had declined to a point where the decision was made to discontinue the operation of hospitals solely for POW patients. The 17th Field Hospital was relieved of the POW mission on 7 October 1969 and relocated to An Khe. to operate a 100-bed facility. The remaining POW hospital at Long Binh was closed on 31 December 1969. POW patients continued to enter the hospital system but were not transferred to a centralized location. The ARVN hospital system also became more responsive to the receipt of POW patients.

Average monthly POW beds occupied

January	February	March	April	May	June	July	August	September	October	November	December
393	386	427	421	384	416	344	270	234	160	126	82

===== RECAP program =====
USARV published a directive on 20 August 1969 which governed the processing of returned, exchanged, or captured US Army personnel. The directive tasked the 44th Medical Brigade with specific functions to perform in support of the program. The brigade operations officer was the medical coordinator for the program. During 1969, the 44th Medical Brigade processed a total of 18 RECAPS.

===== Medical command concept =====
In August 1969, a study was made to determine the feasibility of combining the 44th Medical Brigade headquarters with the Surgeon's Office, Headquarters, USARV into a functional medical command. This study indicated that there was an overlap and duplication of effort in the command, dental, veterinary, administrative and plans and operations functional areas. The study revealed that by combining the two staffs into a medical command, a 15 percent savings in personnel spaces could be generated. No functions presently performed by the Surgeon's Office or by the brigade headquarters would be deleted and the reduction in manpower would not decrease the efficiency of medical operations. The consolidation of these two elements was held in abeyance pending final USARV approval and availability of adequate real estate. Furthermore, a USARV directed action to its major subordinate components to conduct similar studies increased the slippage on the organization of the United States Army Medical Command, Vietnam (Provisional) until 1 March 1970.

===== Medical regulating =====
The mission of the medical regulating office continued to be the control of patient evacuation within the Republic of Vietnam and the coordination of patient evacuation to hospitals in PACOM and CONUS. Two agencies provided medical statistical data. The Medical Records and Statical Division, USARV Surgeon's Office was the primary agency for medical records and reports while the Medical Regulating Office of the brigade served as the agency which accumulated daily statistics for medical regulating and operational purposes.

On 24 August 1969, as a part of USARV's effort to meet new troop ceilings imposed by the Keystone Eagle troop redeployment, the brigade headquarters was requested to reduce the Army patient strength in Vietnam to 2,000 provided the health and wellbeing of the patients were not jeopardized. A policy was established within the brigade to meet this requirement wherever possible, and the patient account was successfully reduced to the desired level and maintained at that level until 6 September 1996.

Initial instructions issued by the brigade headquarters included assigning Army patient ceiling goals to each medical group, restricting elective surgery for Army patients and establishing a policy permitting the evacuation of patients out of country, if not medically contraindicated, without regard to the thirty-day evacuation policy whenever necessary to maintain the Army patient strength as close to 2,000 as possible during the period identified above.

On 6 September 1969, the temporary ceiling of 2,000 total inpatients was lifted and the original DOD ceiling of 3,000 Army patients on census at all facilities was reinstated.

A program was initiated in October 1969 within brigade hospitals to provide reconstructive surgery for ARVN patients hospitalized in nearby ARVN hospitals. The degree of participation was influenced by the medical mission and the capabilities and staffing of brigade hospitals. This program involved the utilization of brigade and ARVN medical facilities and staff, or any combination of them. Direct continuing coordination between the hospital commander and the local ARVN hospital commander was essential to ensure acceptance of the program and optimum participation by all concerned.

Direct liaison was authorized between the brigade MRO and the USARV professional consultants in medicine, surgery and neuropsychiatry. The USARV consultant staff members provided both the professional staffs of each hospital and the brigade MRO necessary guidance concerning the USARV Surgeon's policies regarding specific surgical procedures for out-of-country evacuation. All cases requiring professional judgement were referred by the MRO to the appropriate professional consultant for final decision.

As a result of monitoring medical attendant after-action reports, it was discovered that a majority of the physicians complains stemmed from a lack of knowledge concerning administrative actions required while in Japan. To alleviate this problem, an information letter was prepared utilizing information gathered by the brigade MRO and the Executive Officer. Further guidance would be provided to individual attendants upon receipt of United States Army Medical Command, Japan operational policy concerning medical attendants.

Total operating beds operated by 44th Medical Brigade hospitals reflected a decrease throughout 1969 as a result of redeployment activities.

During 1969, wounded in action admissions reached high points in March and again in May and then reflected a decrease which coincided with a decrease in friendly and enemy initiated combat activity.

Hospital dispositions by medical evacuation out-of-country to PACOM or CONUS hospitals reached a high of 4,334 during May 1969 and a low of 1,789 during November 1969.

The average daily census of Vietnamese civilians reached a high point of 556 during January 1969 and a low of 263 during October 1969. Care was provided for Vietnamese Civilians who were suffering from war related injuries and for those individuals requiring hospitalization for treatment not available at Government of Vietnam medical facilities.

Hospitalization statistics for 1969

Month	Admissions WIA	Admissions DNBI	Total admissions	Evac out of RVN	Returned to duty	Hospital deaths	Total dispositions
January	3,521	7,852	11,373	3,224	7,121	261	10,606
February	3,832	6,615	10,447	3,099	6,222	293	9,614
March	5,148	7,613	12,761	4,166	7,070	336	11,572
April	3,504	8,024	11,528	3,210	7,055	287	10,552
May	5,061	8,518	13,579	4,334	7,520	324	12,178
June	4,192	7,876	12,068	3,951	6,589	302	10,842
July	2,774	8,083	10,857	2,879	6,400	254	9,533
August	3,434	7,343	10,777	3,308	6,317	228	9,853
September	2,363	6,928	9,291	2,187	5,192	210	7,589
October	2,078	7,400	9,478	1,890	5,929	197	8,016
November	2,368	6,901	9,284	1,789	5,706	237	7,732
December	2,273	7,218	9,491	1,879	6,235	249	8,363

- WIA=Wounded in action
- DNBI=Disease and non-battle injury
- Patients admitted in one month may be discharged, evacuated, or die in a subsequent month

44th Medical Brigade daily medical statistics—post Tet Offensive
0001 hours, 23 February 1969 – 2400 hours, 28 February 1968

	23 February	24 February	25 February	26 February	27 February	28 February	Total
Total direct admissions	730	463	490	408	412	409	2,512
Total WIA admissions	598	220	258	191	196	165	1,628
U.S. Army WIA	346	120	110	128	101	107	912
Total dispositions	419	415	376	379	415	376	2,380
Return to duty/discharge	281	250	233	221	225	213	1,423
Evacuations out of country	120	150	130	138	181	156	875
Died in hospital	18	15	13	20	9	7	82

44th Medical Brigade daily medical statistics—post Tet Offensive
0001 Hours, 12 May 1969 — 2400 Hours, 18 May 1968

	12 May	13 May	14 May	15 May	16 May	17 May	18 May	Total
Total Direct Admissions	821	550	503	516	418	430	492	3,730
Total WIA Admissions	561	288	229	228	135	149	282	1,872
U.S. Army WIA	438	234	195	173	88	109	227	1,464
Total Dispositions	433	598	520	445	488	445	387	3,316
Return to Duty/Discharge	307	305	254	262	268	250	213	1,859
Evacuations Out of Country	111	268	250	175	213	185	158	1,360
Died in Hospital	15	25	16	8	7	10	16	97

Average daily census of Vietnamese civilians

	January	February	March	April	May	June	July	August	September	October	November	December
War Related (CWCP)	264	251	258	230	204	176	125	129	117	95	115	140
Non-War Related	292	209	210	283	252	199	209	150	157	168	161	181
Total	556	460	468	513	456	375	334	279	274	263	276	321

Average daily operating beds (all patients) 1969

January	February	March	April	May	June	July	August	September	October	November	December
5,203	5,106	5,123	4,960	4,826	4,702	4,372	4,324	4,223	3,775	3,589	3,642

===== Aeromedical evacuation =====
Aviation activities for 1969 were generally similar to those of 1968. Workload continued to increase slightly with a new high of 206,229 patients evacuated by brigade aircraft. This represented an increase of 16,775 patients over the previous high established in 1968. During March 10,139 missions were flown evacuating 21,843 patients for a monthly high. Workload throughout the remainder of the year was fairly consistent ranging from 15,000 to 17,000 patients evacuated per month. March and May were exceptions when patient evacuations rose to 21,843 and 20,565 respectively.

Of the various types of aeromedical evacuation missions, the most hazardous continued to be missions where the patients required extraction utilizing the aircraft hoist and rescue seat (forest penetrator). During the year there was a significant increase in the number of hoist missions, particularly in the month of December 1969.

In December 1969 there were 381 hoist missions of which 140 were performed by the 57th Medical Detachment (RA), the highest monthly figure for any brigade unit. Total hoist missions increased by 780 during 1969 for a grand total of 2,516 missions, another new high for the brigade.

In 1969 medical evacuation aircraft were hit by hostile fire 309 times as compared to 386 times in 1968. This 16% decrease in hits was quite significant in that both the total number of patients evacuated and the number of potentially dangerous hoist missions increased considerably.

Air ambulance resources available during 1969 included two medical companies (air ambulance) with locations at Long Binh and Qui Nhon and 11 medical detachments (RA) with locations as of 31 December 1969 at Quang Tri, Phu Bai, Da Nang and two detachments at Chu Lai in I CTZ; Pleiku, Nha Trang and Phan Rang in II CTZ; Cu Chi and Lai Khe in III CTZ; and Binh Thuy in IV CTZ. During 1969 it became necessary to relocate several of the RA teams in order to provide more responsive support. The relocations were presented in the chart on unit relocations in the S-3 Operations section for 1969. There were no major problems encountered with those moves. The moves continued to demonstrate the flexibility of the RA teams.

Due to the disposition of medical units throughout all of Vietnam, the brigade was authorized the use of one U-1A Otter fixed-wing aircraft, above TOE authorization. The U-1A proved to be a valuable addition to the brigade's aviation capability.

There were 116 UH-1H aircraft assigned to the brigade with an aircraft availability rate of 72 percent, which was 2 percent above the 1968 availability rate and was also 2 percent above the USARV minimum acceptable availability rate. Throughout the year there was a direct correlation between the number of patients evacuated, hours flown, times hit by hostile fire and aircraft availability. However, there were other variables such as accidents, non-scheduled maintenance and parts shortages that contributed to the rate. Mainly because of the variables mentioned, the availability rate for December 1969 was 8 percent.

On 8 June 1969, the 551st Transportation Detachment was assigned to the 45th Medical Company (Air Ambulance) for direct support maintenance. The assignment of the 551st Transportation Detachment has enhanced the maintenance capability by improving the quality of work and contributed to the timely completion of ma1ntenance.

Aeromedical evacuation statistics 1969

	January	February	March	April	May	June	July	August	September	October	November	December	Total
Number of Times Hit by Hostile Fire	23	33	30	22	46	22	23	24	24	24	18	20	309
Number of Hoist Missions (Patients)	176	145	227	183	225	192	137	186	197	252	215	381	2,516
Number of Times Hit by Hostile Fire (Hoist Missions)	3	2	3	5	6	2	2	4	5	2	4	1	39
Number of Crew Killed	4	5	4	0	4	0	0	0	0	0	2	0	19
Number of Crew Wounded	8	19	8	8	14	7	4	8	13	7	3	4	103
Number of Patients Killed	3	0	0	0	0	0	0	0	0	0	0	0	3
Number of Patients Wounded	0	1	1	1	2	3	0	0	0	0	1	2	11
Number of Aircraft Combat Losses	1	5	11	3	6	3	2	6	2	6	1	1	45
Total Number of Missions Flown	8,505	7,423	10,139	9,006	9,810	9,097	8,229	8,516	8,150	8,324	7,891	9,022	104,112
Total Flight Hours	6,764	5,860	7,587	6.307	7,026	6,673	6,193	6,730	6,154	6,298	6,171	6,889	78,652
Number of Patients Evacuated:													
U.S. Patients	6,332	6,182	9,275	6,806	8,420	7,536	6,195	6,195	5,410	5,198	5,598	5,452	79,319
FWMAF	410	408	571	548	734	486	619	535	526	614	379	460	6,290
ARVN	4,806	4,431	5,567	4,476	5,492	5,065	3,856	5,000	4,623	4,804	5,010	4,780	57,910
RVN Civilians	3,641	4,054	5,192	4,610	5,229	4,593	4,334	4,610	4,151	3,648	4,092	4,186	52,342
Other	1,050	615	1,236	982	690	951	927	661	621	774	886	975	10,368
Total	16,239	15,690	21,843	17,422	20,565	18,631	15,931	17,721	15,331	15,038	15,965	15,853	206,229
Average Aircraft on Hand	116	116	116	116	116	116	116	116	116	116	116	116	
Average Percentage Aircraft on Hand	74.9%	71.4%	68.5%	71.8%	71.2%	69.0%	74.3%	79%	80%	76%	74%	68%	72%

- (Note 1) Abbreviations: FWMAF=Free World Military Assistance Forces; ARVN=Army of the Republic of Vietnam

===== S-2/historian =====
The S-2 Section activities remained essentially unchanged from 1968. In maintaining the 44th Medical Brigade personnel security program, the section handled approximately 700 requests from subordinate units for either security clearance validations or for USAIRR checks, gave an estimated 400 security briefings/debriefings to headquarters personnel and processed 21 requests for revocation of security clearances.

Only one security violation involving classified documents was processed during 1969. The resulting investigation determined that no documents had been compromised.

In late November 1969, the S-2 as project officer for the implementation of the NESTOR Secure Voice Program, published and distributed implementing instructions to brigade units. When implemented, this program gave brigade units the capability of communicating with tactical elements in a secure mode, thus preventing enemy forces from acquiring vital intelligence data.

Throughout 1969, the S-2, as a member of the Command Inspection Team had been able to analyze procedures implemented at several commands and developed a standardized SOP to allow each unit to benefit from the experiences of others. In December 1969, a complete thirty-four-page checklist for all S-2 activities including personnel, internal, communications and physical security as well as historical activities was published as an additional guide, assuring compliance with all pertinent regulations.

The implementation of brigade staff visits on a monthly basis to the major subordinate units and selected units of their command has enabled the S-2 Section to evaluate systems and procedures implemented at the unit level in areas of internal, communications and physical security. The unit's historical files and activities were evaluated for adequacy and accuracy. Deficiencies noted during the staff visits were pointed out to the responsible individual during the visit, and many were corrected on the spot. The report of deficiencies noted was a valuable tool for subordinate units in preparation for command inspections and Annual General Inspections.

===== S-4 =====
Unchanged from the previous year, the S-4 mission remained, essentially stated as follows: To advise and act for the brigade commander, as directed, in all aspects of general supply, maintenance of equipment, transportation, and services as pertains to the effective operation of all units assigned or attached to the brigade; to advise, assist, and act for the brigade commander, as directed in all aspects of construction and maintenance of medical facilities occupied or required for all units assigned to the brigade, to include the acquisition of real estate and facilities; and to act for the brigade commander in matters pertaining to the coordination, supervision, and administration of area damage control and utility conservation programs; and to act as the Brigade Claims Officer.

The logistical mission was successfully accomplished, although some problems were encountered from time to time during the course of 1969. However, these problems were resolved for the most part without having to resort to improvisation.

There were no unresolved problems carried over from 1968.

The S-4 Section was staffed at 100 percent authorized MTOE strength during most of 1969. The number of personnel authorized, nine officers and thirteen enlisted, was sufficient for performance of the section's mission. Records of personnel turnover reveal that seven officers and eight enlisted departed the section while six officers and seven enlisted were newly assigned.

Medical supply of brigade units was satisfactory throughout 1969. There were no shortages of required items, and the system was responsive to the needs of the user.

During the course of 1969, the medical supply section continued to refine and implement procedures for the effective management, acquisition, and control of medical stocks in units throughout the brigade. To this end, regulations were reviewed and revised as required, quality control data were published, facility stockage reports were analyzed and monitored to detect and anticipate problem areas, frequent courtesy visits were made to subordinate units to evaluate the adequacy of and compliance with established procedures, and a program was developed to assist units in eliminating excess medical equipment. To accomplish this, teams from the 32d Medical Depot were sent to the various hospitals to perform technical inspections of unit-identified excesses. The visits were prearranged on a scheduled basis so that all units could prepare and assemble excesses for inspection prior to the arrival of the teams. The teams began their visits in September and by the end of 1969 ten hospitals had been cleared of their excess, namely the 24th, 29th, 36th, 67th, 71st, 85th and 91st Evacuation Hospitals and the 8th and 17th Field Hospitals. As a result of this program, much excess was redistributed to satisfy equipment shortages in other units, and some excess equipment was retrograded out-of-country as surplus to the command.

Three MUST hospitals were closed during 1969, the 3d, the 18th, and the 22d Surgical Hospitals, located at Dung Tam, Camp Evans, and Phu Bai, respectively. The 22d Surgical Hospital was zeroed out and applied against the Keystone Cardinal force-reduction increment; while the 3d and 18th Surgical Hospitals relocated into fixed facilities, the 3d to Can Tho and the 18th to Quang Tri. Close-down operations went smoothly despite the fact that there were both Army standard and MUST peculiar equipment to segregate, inspect, clean, and process. Some of the MUST equipment from these hospitals went into depot storage in-country and some of the equipment was retrograded to Okinawa.

A program was initiated in August 1969 to upgrade the medical equipment of residual brigade hospitals, the term "residual" meaning those hospitals to remain in Vietnam under then-existing plans. Designed to obtain equipment suitable for use in fixed, semi-permanent facilities, capable of providing the type of diagnostic and therapeutic service required under a longer-term evacuation policy, the program was started by conducting a survey of professional personnel in selected brigade hospitals for the purpose of identifying general equipment requirements. The survey was completed in November 1969. Subsequently, the medical supply section, screening the survey data, developed a consolidated standard item requirements listing. The requirements totaled 262 separate line items, forty-seven of which were Acquisition Advice Code "L." "Non-standard" requirements were not developed by the end of 1969 even though the survey data were available. The reason for this was the lack of manufacturer's catalogs. Catalogs had been requested at the start of the project, but the number received was not sufficient to begin on this phase of the project before the end of the year. The required catalogs were expected to be on hand by the end of the first quarter of calendar year 1970, at which time work on the project would resume. The cost of the equipment upgrade program was expected to be approximately $500,000 per hospital. Four to eight residual hospitals were planned, meaning that the total cost of the program would be between two and four million dollars. It was anticipated at the end of 1969 that all required upgrade equipment, both standard and non-standard, would be placed on order during the second quarter of 1970.

By USARV directive a medical Supply satellization program was initiated in September 1969 for all MACV advisory teams. Arranged so that these teams would draw supplies directly from the nearest brigade hospital, the program reduced the number of customer accounts that had to be managed by the medical depot, resulting in a corresponding decrease in the depot's administrative workload. Since the number of line items required to support the teams was negligible and essentially common to brigade hospitals, and since the number of customers to be supported was not excessive, with only one hospital satellited with more than four teams, the, program posed no hardship on the hospitals and proved overall to be a worthwhile undertaking.

Non-medical support of brigade units—that is, maintenance support, supply support, and services support—was, by and large, satisfactorily provided by 1st Logistical Command activities. In the area of supply support, however, some items were intermittently or chronically in short supply.

M-151A1 ¼-ton trucks, 3/4-ton ambulances, replacement motors, sandbags, and lumber were items in chronic short supply.

Because of the difficulty of obtaining replacement vehicles, many units were obliged to operate with less than their authorized complement. Hardest hit were the ambulance companies, which operated for most of the year with only 66 percent of their authorized ambulances, the remainder being on requisition, due out on back order from CONUS. At the close of 1969, many requisitions for ambulances were six months old. This shortage made it necessary for ambulance companies—and other affected units as well—to optimize the service capability of all remaining on-hand vehicles. This was accomplished by a concomitant measure of success by stressing and enforcing on a command-wide basis the proper and timely execution of preventive maintenance services, and also by conserving wherever possible on the use of vehicular assets. as an example of the latter, the 418th Ambulance Company ceased providing ambulance escorts to convoys operating in and around the Cam Ranh Bay area but continued, on the other hand, to provide medics in support of this requirement; only the medics that supported the requirement were transported in vehicles that made up the convoy, not ambulances. This, of course, satisfied the medical coverage requirement, yet at the same time conserved on ambulance usage.

Sandbags became in critical supply around mid-summer and remained so for the rest of 1969, during which they were authorized for use by tactical elements only, making it necessary for all brigade units to use expedient materials for constructing protective shelters and revetments. Expedients included material such as artillery ammunition boxes, 55-gallon drums, salvaged crating material, etc.-

Lumber, sizes 1x, 2x, 4x, to include plywood, became in critical supply during the summer and also remained chronically short through the end of 1969. to ensure that lumber was used only for the most pressing requirements throughout Vietnam USARV established a monthly allocation where in-country supplies were issued to major subordinate commands on a percentage basis, determined according to the number of critically urgent, engineer-approved construction projects in each command. This was a departure from previous procedures in that lumber was formerly allocated to construction activities only. Under the new system, each major subordinate command had to submit a monthly forecast of urgent projects along with a detailed justification for the lumber required in support of them. Lumber allocations to the brigade during the period July through December were approximately one-fourth of that which the headquarters had requested, and the majority of all received lumber went to the 32d Medical Depot to satisfy packing and crating material requirements. The lumber shortage delayed the start and completion of several brigade construction projects. It also prevented subordinate units of the brigade from doing any appreciable amount or self-help work to improve or renovate facilities. However, according to the Assistant Chief of Staff, G-4, USARV, the lumber position was expected to satisfy normal construction requirements by February 1970.

As in 1968, vehicle repair parts, stationery, printing supplies, and other items ware intermittently in short supply throughout the year. Command assistance in redistribution of brigade assets generally resolved problems caused by those shortages.

Maintenance programs and logistical readiness throughout the command improved as a result of vigorous supervisory emphasis and follow-up by the maintenance section of the brigade. This policy, implemented initially in August 1968, was a carry-over from the preceding year. Also as in 1968, the CMMI team continued to as an instruction activity, making frequent liaison visits for the purpose of instructing equipment users, maintenance personnel, and commanders on materiel management and preventive maintenance techniques. The results obtained by this approach were very encouraging: CMMI scores for 1969 improved considerably over those of the previous year. The average CMMI score in 1968 was below 70 percent, a failing score; the average for 1969 was a greatly improved 78 percent. Of the 123 units inspected, 79 percent were rated satisfactory while 21 percent were unsatisfactory.

Two force reductions occurred during the calendar year, one during the period June through August 1969, code-named Keystone Eagle, and the other during the period October through December, code-named Keystone Cardinal. Together, these reductions totaled 65,000 troops. The general supply and maintenance section was responsible for the logistical planning and execution of Keystone Eagle and Cardinal which entailed the following:

1. Identifying and making provisions for the redistribution and retrograde of excess assets, such as stocks, equipment and materiel, generated as a result of the redeployments/inactivations
2. Turning over and/or acquiring facilities/real estate to satisfy changes in mission assignments brought about by force reductions
3. Developing and distributing, as appropriate, the necessary instructions required to execute the logistical aspects of the operation

Although instructions were given out initially in a rather piecemeal fashion because of policy and procedural changes emanating from USARV, a very workable plan was developed by the time that Keystone Cardinal got underway. Published as Annex F to Brigade Operations Plan 183-69, it proved effective in guiding, monitoring, and controlling redeployment actions. Two important lessons that were learned from the force reductions were:

1. Logistical planning must be done at all levels as far in advance of the date of redeployment/inactivation as possible.
2. There must be a continuing effort among all units to identify and eliminate excess

During the first half of 1969, the policy on new construction in Vietnam was liberal, just as it had been in 1968; and there were sufficient funds available to satisfy most medical construction exigencies as well as to satisfy brigade upgrade plans. Starting in June, however, USARV curtailed all but the most essential construction. The impact that this had on the brigade was rather awesome. Prior to the curtaillment, the brigade had fifty-six approved construction projects, the cost of which totaled a little more than thirteen million dollars. After reviewing these projects, USARV canceled half of them because they did not fall within the urgency criteria established. Those projects which were approved, totaling approximately six million dollars, a decrease of fifty percent from the pre-curtaillment figure, were primarily upgrade projects which had to do with improving utilities, like water, sewage, electrical, and air-conditioning systems.

===== Nursing services =====
The mission of nursing services was to advise the brigade commander on all aspects of nursing service program within the command; coordinate overall nursing service activities; supervise and provide staff direction in professional matters pertinent to nursing services to all elements within the command.

The functions of nursing services include:

1. Recommending assignment and reassignment of Army Nurse Corps personnel
2. Defined, prepared, recommended, and coordinated nursing service policies in the command
3. Implemented brigade policies and directives and disseminated technical nursing information to subordinate units
4. Accomplished required nurse planning consistent with the plans of higher and subordinate headquarters
5. Maintained close liaison with S-1 of brigade Headquarters and of each medical group relative to nurse assignment and all personnel actions pertaining to all Army Nurse Corps officers within the 44th Medical Brigade
6. Provided guidance to Army Nurse Corps officers relative to career plans in individual interviews given at meetings during visits to each installation

A total of 180 staff visits were made to hospital units during 1969. Emphasis was made on staffing needs, career guidance, and standards of patient care. During 2d quarter a liaison visit was made to the Americal Division to visit the aid stations. The feasibility of assigning a Medical-Surgical Nurse (MOS 3448) to the Office of the Division Surgeon and/or sending medical surgical nurses from nearby hospitals on periodic visits to the division medical companies were discussed.

A total of 727 Army Nurse Corps officers were interviewed, oriented and assigned. The major problem area was the delay in in-processing occurring at the 90th Replacement Battalion, resulting in officers remaining there 2–5 days awaiting orders and transportation. This has been resolved since early November 1969 when a 44th Medical Brigade personnel team was initiated to meet all incoming AMEDD officers and bringing them directly to the Personnel Branch Office or the Surgeon where orders were cut. The system greatly expedited reception and in-processing.

During the first quarter of 1969 a one-day conference was conducted for the Chief Nurses of 68th Medical Group.

During the first and second quarters monthly meetings of the Joint Civilian Nursing Committee were conducted. Those participating were nurses from the US military, Vietnam Ministry of Health Bureau of Nursing, USAID Nursing Division and ARVN. The purpose of these meetings was to help upgrade nursing in Vietnam, both civilian and military.

During the 3d quarter of 1969, the first conference for all Army Chief Nurses in Vietnam was conducted in Saigon. It was recommended that a conference be held at least once a year and preferably every six months.

During inactivation and redeployment of hospitals, nurses who had more than thirty days remaining in-country were interviewed and, as far as possible, reassigned according to their preference. Several units were also relocated during the year.

A sixty-day wearing test of the jungle hat for female nurses was conducted by 160 nurses. Almost 100 percent recommended that the jungle hat be authorized for wear. It was felt that the jungle hat was more attractive, did not blow off, protected the hair, and was more comfortable than the baseball style cap currently authorized. The results of the test were forwarded to Department of the Army.

Continued improvement was made in the living quarters for Army Nurse Corps officers. Much of the improvement was made by self-help, but some air-conditioning was installed. Quarters at the 67th Evacuation Hospital and the 12th Evacuation Hospital were partially if not completely air-conditioned.

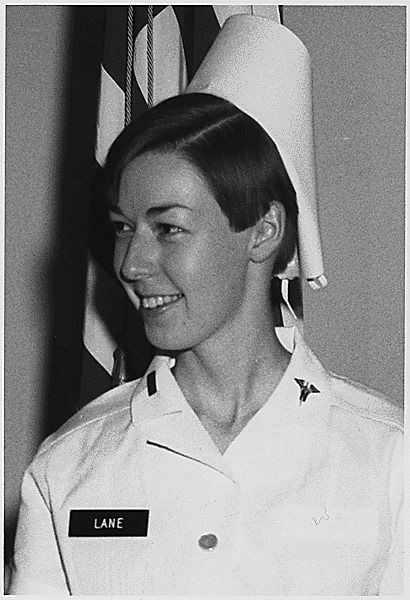
First Lieutenant Sharon Ann Lane, shown here during her promotion to First Lieutenant, was killed in action at the 312th Evacuation Hospital on 6 June 1969.

First Lieutenant Sharon Ann Lane was killed by shrapnel from a 122mm rocket while on duty at the 312th Evacuation Hospital. One of eight US servicewomen to die in Vietnam, she was the only one to be killed due to enemy action. Several nurses have received minor fragment wounds during mortar and rocket attacks.

In all hospitals where Vietnamese Civilian personnel have been hired for Nursing service duties, intensive on the job training programs have been initiated. It was necessary to teach English classes and to teach basic nursing procedures.

Participation in MEDCAP activities has continued to be of great interest to the nurses. They have participated in programs at schools, orphanages, hospitals, clinics, and leprosariums.

===== Staff dietitian =====
Although only two dietitians were authorized in Vietnam, five were assigned in country at the end of 1969. In addition to the staff dietitian, 44th Medical Brigade, there was one dietitian assigned to each of the three medical groups of the brigade. As of 1 January 1970, the fifth dietitian would be assigned to the 3d Field Hospital in Saigon.

With the close cooperation of the personnel sections of USARV and the 44th Medical Brigade, the staff dietitian had been very successful in ensuring that highly trained hospital food service personnel coming to Vietnam remained in 44th Medical Brigade units. Beginning in September 1969, one staff dietitian or the food service supervisor of the brigade interviewed and assigned 94F E6s and E7s. This ensured a more equitable distribution of well-trained mess stewards. The improved quality of supervisory personnel has greatly assisted the units in their food service program. These hospital-trained stewards were much more able to give proper guidance and supervision in the area of patient feeding.

Seven dietitians attended the dietetic conference held in Delat on 23–24 August. The program was coordinated with the United States Army Procurement Activity, Vietnam (USAPAV), Dalat Field Office. The USAPAV representative presented an informative and interesting briefing on the procurement and distribution of fresh fruits and vegetables in Vietnam. The conference provided an opportunity for the exchange of ideas on improvement of food service operations and the discussion of problem areas.

A Best Mess Award Program was established in the 67th Medical group. The commanding officer presented the first award to the 27th Surgical Hospital in June 1969. The program was designed to promote the highest possible standards of food presentation, service, sanitation and management within the messes of the command. The quarterly award was a rotating trophy which was retained by the winning unit until a new winner was selected. A permanently retained plaque was also presented to the winning mess.

Nuoc mam was received by the brigade hospitals for the Vietnamese patients. This was a result of a recommendation that providing nuoc mam be extended to all Vietnamese patients after the International Red Cross requested that it be purchased for POW patients. By the end of 1969, $3,000 had been expended to purchase nuoc mam for brigade units during the year.

The staff dietitian instructed ten Thai mess sergeants in a class on formal nutrition as a part of a training program instituted by 1st Logistical Command for the Royal Thai Army Volunteer Force in Vietnam. The dietitian also assisted the II Field Force, Vietnam food service officer in developing a 28-day cycle menu which was more acceptable to the Thai Army which would be implemented by the 1st Logistical Command in 1970.

The dietitians in each medical group were able to concentrate more on training activities for both Vietnamese and military food service personnel in 1969. Vietnamese had been dubbed in on a hospital sanitation film and was being shown to Vietnamese local national employees in 44th Medical Brigade units. The group dietitians were able to function more effectively as dietetic consultants since delegating more of their administrative and food service inspection functions to the group food service warrant officers and food service supervisors. Unfortunately, in Vietnam unit sanitation was an ever-continuing problem. In many cases commanders, executive officers and mess officers, due to lack of knowledge, seemed unable to demand the minimum standards required by Army regulations. Only by these continuing monthly group inspections did the units maintain desirable standards of sanitation.

During 1969 units of the Army Medical Service fed approximately 3,300,000 rations of which 1,100,000 were patient rations.

Staff visits were made to medical treatment facilities throughout 1969. Emphasis was placed on procurement of garrison mess equipment; training of cooks in preparation and service of food with particular emphasis on patient feeding on the wards; training of local national personnel; mess management and administration; procurement of supplement foods and beverages for patient feeding; and assisting in closing some hospital food services as units were redeployed or inactivated under Operation Keystone.

Renovation of the 6th Convalescent Center's mess hall was completed in June 1969. The original facility was inadequate in construction, design, kitchen equipment and layout. After the renovation, it was possible to comfortably feed 3,000 meals daily.

The 67th Medical Group completed the initial installation of garrison mess equipment. These were the last hospital units of the 44th Medical Brigade to utilize garrison mess equipment.

The 20th Preventive Medicine Unit moved from their old mess ball at Bien Hoa to a new facility at Long Binh Post.

Hospital food service at the 17th Surgical Hospital, 22d Surgical Hospital, and 17th Field POW Hospital was phased out, and mess equipment in these units was turned in or relocated to other 44th Medical Brigade units.

The 18th Surgical Hospital moved from Camp Evans to Quang Tri during November 1969. Mess equipment was relocated to the new unit mess hall, which was cleaned, painted, and rescreened for the move. All installation was completed with the exception of the dishwasher.

USARV medical treatment facilities subsisted on the field ration A menu as established for all troops in Vietnam. The support that Class I facilities gave the hospitals was commendable. The only area where real supply problems continued to exist was Can Tho. They had difficulty throughout 1969 with fresh produce and were not always able to get milk or ice cream for the hospital. There had been some improvement in the situation during December 1969, and 1st Logistical Command felt that a recent reorganization of the Class I supply point at Can Tho would remedy the ongoing problems.

The 28-day Master Hospital Menu, 44th Medical Brigade Pamphlet 30-1 was revised on 1 November 1969 so it would be compatible with the new 28-day Master Menu published as Supply Bulletin 10-261, dated 22 August 1969, then in use for troop feeding in Vietnam.

The 44th Medical Brigade Food Service Regulation 30-1 was revised effective 1 November 1969.

==== 1970 ====
The 44th Medical Brigade did not publish an Army Medical Service Activities Report covering its work in Vietnam from January to March 1970, instead relying on the staff of the United States Army Medical Command, Vietnam to cover their work as part of the USAMEDCOMV's annual report. In some instances, they covered the period from 1 January to 28 February 1970 well, in others they did not.

===== Organization of USAMEDCOMV, groups and major subordinate units =====
On 1 March 1970, the United States Army Medical Command, Vietnam was organized as a result or consolidating the 44th Medical Brigade and the USARV Surgeon's Office. The Medical Command organization eliminated duplication of effort, reduced manpower requirements by 17 percent and provided a headquarters that would be more responsive to drawdown requirements.

The 43d Medical Group, with headquarters at Nah Trang, was inactivated 7 February 1970. The 43d Medical Group was responsible for field army level medical support in the area or operations of II Corps Tactical Zone/Military Region II (MR II). With the inactivation of the 43d Medical Group the responsibility for the medical units within the geographic area of MR II was divided roughly in half. The 67th Medical Group assumed the responsibility for the northern half and the 68th Medical Group assumed the responsibility for the southern half.

The concept of a medical battalion composed entirely of helicopter ambulance and ground ambulance units was developed. This battalion would have sole responsibility for combat evacuation, both air and ground within its area of operation. To implement this concept, the 61st Medical Battalion was organized at Qui Nhon during January 1970 and assigned a mix of an air ambulance company, helicopter ambulance detachments, ground ambulance companies and ground ambulance detachments. After a three-month period of testing and observation of the 61st Medical Battalion, the 58th Medical Battalion was organized at Long Binh along similar lines.

This concept provided a better utilization of evacuation assets, improved response, improved maintenance and better command and control. Direct command, control and supervision was provided by a senior experienced Medical Service Corps aviator with extensive experience in medical evacuation, both ground and air. Abandoned at the end of the war, the concept would be revived again in the 1990s based on lessons re-learned during Operation Desert Storm.

===== S-1 =====
Decorations awarded by month

Month	AM	AM w/V	ARCOM	ARCOM w/V	BSM	BSM w/V	Total
January	336	24	199	4	102	2	367
February	21	17	161	7	132	5	343
Total	357	41	360	11	234	7	710

- (Note 1) Abbreviation: AM=Air Medal; ARCOM=Army Commendation Medal; BSM=Bronze Star Medal; w/V=awarded for Valor

The brigade S-1 also processed eight Distinguished Flying Crosses and two Legions of Merit in January and eleven Distinguished Flying Crosses and three Legions of Merit in February, although these were passed to USARV for final approval, as the brigade commander did not have approval authority for those awards.

===== S-3 =====
January and February 1970 were spent planning, and then executing, Operation Keystone Bluejay, the third increment of troop withdrawals from Vietnam.

Unit	Strength	Date of redeployment/inactivation
1st Medical Company (Ambulance)	72	4 February 1970
1st Medical Laboratory (Mobile)	12	6 February 1970
359th Medical Detachment (IE)	8	6 February 1970
43d Medical Group	41	7 February 1970
760th Medical Detachment (JB)	19	9 February 1970
463d Medical Detachment (KB)	3	14 February 1970
67th Medical Detachment (KE)	7	16 February 1970
219th Medical Detachment (KJ)	19	16 February 1970
551st Medical Detachment (KH)	3	16 February 1970
74th Medical Detachment (Mobile Laboratory)	12	18 February 1970
241st Medical Detachment (MB)	21	18 February 1970
764th Medical Detachment (IE)	8	18 February 1970
257th Medical Detachment (KJ)	36	20 February 1970
945th Medical Detachment (KA)	7	20 February 1970
210th Medical Detachment (MC)	31	28 February 1970

Additionally, the 57th Medical Detachment (RA) was relocated from Lai Khe to Binh Tuy, effective 19 February, the first of many unit relocations during the year, the rest of which would be executed under the auspices of USAMEDCOMV.

===== Medical regulating =====
Hospitalization statistics for 1970

Month	Admissions WIA	Admissions DNBI	Total admissions	Evac out of RVN	Returned to duty	Hospital deaths	Total dispositions
January	2,777	2,444	14,359	3,040	7,780	194	11,014
February	2,444	10,873	13,317	2,558	7,075	189	9,822

- WIA=Wounded in action
- DNBI=Disease and non-battle injury
- Patients admitted in one month may be discharged, evacuated, or die in a subsequent month

Average daily census of Vietnamese civilians

	January	February
War Related (CWCP)	157	126
Non-War Related	244	259
Total	401	385

Average daily operating beds (all patients) 1970

January	February
3,513	3,293

===== Aeromedical evacuation =====
Aeromedical Evacuation Statistics 1970

	January	February	Total
Number of Times Hit by Hostile Fire	35	21	56
Number of Hoist Missions (Patients)	355	171	526
Number of Times Hit by Hostile Fire (Hoist Missions)	1	5	6
Number of Crew Killed	0	0	0
Number of Crew Wounded	15	9	24
Number of Patients Killed	1	1	2
Number of Patients Wounded	0	1	1
Number of Aircraft Combat Losses	3	1	4
Total Number of Missions Flown	9,750	9,382	19,132
Total Flight Hours	7,268	7,374	14,642
Number of Patients Evacuated:			
U.S. Patients	5,164	5,125	10,289
FWMAF	412	478	890
ARVN	5,551	5,085	10,636
RVN Civilians	4,095	4,183	8,278
Other	637	885	1522
Total	15,859	15,729	31,588
Average Aircraft on Hand	116	116	116
Average Percentage Aircraft Available	72.5%	74.5%	73.5%

- (Note 1) Abbreviations: FWMAF=Free World Military Assistance Forces; ARVN=Army of the Republic of Vietnam

===== S-4 =====
Customer demand satisfaction rate

The primacy indicator of supply responsiveness and effectiveness was the customer demand satisfaction rate. The rate for standard stocked items for December 1969 was 89.1%.

Month	Demand satisfaction rate
January 1970	88.9%
February 1970	89.4%

The rate for non-standard stocked items was not as high as for standard stocked items. This was to be expected since the items were not normally stocked by CONUS depots and therefore procurement had to be initiated each time a requisition was received. The rates for nonstandard stocked items were:

Month	Demand satisfaction rate
January 1970	88.9%
February 1970	89.4%

- (Note 1) Although the rates were the same as for stocked items in January and February, they dropped significantly in the remainder of the year.

Requisitioning objectives

The dollar value of the requisitioning objective at the end of December 1969 was $11.1 million.

Month	Command depot issues
January 1970	$2.0 million
February 1970	$2.2 million

===== Nursing services =====
In February, the jungle hat was approved for female nurses.

A shortage of quarters for female officers at residual hospitals was recognized in February. A memorandum for record was sent to the USARV Deputy Commanding General by the brigade commander requesting trailers at the residual hospitals.

The last of the tent quarters went with the closure of the 2d Surgical Hospital at Lai Khe before its subsequent inactivation on 10 March 1970.

===== Optician consultant =====
Eyeglass fabrication in Vietnam

Month	32d Medical Depot	Divisions	Total
January	13,512	5, 890	19,402
February	14,900	5,070	19,970
Totals	28,412	10,960	39,372

===== Information office =====
Attesting to the quality of the 44th Brigadier in comparison with other multilith newspapers was its 3d place award in March 1970 in the USARV Newspaper Contest for 1969. The newspaper placed third in a field of 24 similar multilith-produced newspapers.

===== "Redeployment" of the brigade =====
Although the 44th Medical Brigade headquarters had been reduced to zero strength and all personnel had been reassigned to the United States Army Medical Command, Vietnam (Provisional) on 1 March 1970, the brigade itself was still considered deployed by the Army and would remain deployed until December 1970. on 2 December 1970 Brigadier General Thomas redeployed to the United States to assume command of Brooke Army Medical Center, and on 14 December an enlisted color guard consisting of an E-6 and an E-5 carried the 44th Medical Brigade's colors to Fort Meade, Maryland, where the brigade had been formally transferred. On 14 December the Army formally established the United States Army Medical Command, Vietnam as a table of Distribution and Allocation unit, and the (Provisional) designation was dropped from its name.

=== 44th Medical Brigade at Fort Meade, Maryland ===
There had long been a medical command and control headquarters at Fort Meade, Maryland. The 68th Medical Group had been the senior command and control headquarters from when it was activated on 27 July 1954 until it deployed to the Republic of Vietnam in early 1966. To replace it, the 18th Medical Brigade was transferred from Fort Lee, Virginia, where it had been stationed since its activation on 18 August 1967, with an effective date of 14 March 1968.

==== Mission ====
1. The TOE Mission of the 44th Medical Brigade specified the provision of army level medical support within a field army and the command of all non-divisional medical units in the field army.
2. The role of the brigade at Fort Meade included training for the accomplishment of the TOE mission as well as coordinating and providing support for 22 Continental Army Command or higher headquarters contingency plans and 8 Fort George G. Meade contingency plans. Two units were included on the United States Strike Command Troop List.
3. 44th Medical Brigade personnel and equipment were involved in 18 permanent or extended mission commitments, the majority of which are at Fort George G. Meade. In addition, ROTC and reserve summer camps at Indiantown Gap Military Reservation, Pennsylvania, Camp Pickett, Virginia, and Camp Drum, New York, were heavily supported.

==== Organization ====
On 16 December 1970, First US Army General Order number 450 directed two actions. First, Headquarters and Headquarters Detachment, 18th Medical Brigade was inactivated and second, Headquarters and Headquarters Detachment, 44th Medical Brigade was reorganized and assigned to First Army. Personnel and equipment requirements of the 44th Medical Brigade were filled from assets made available by the inactivation of the 18th Medical Brigade. Mission, organization, structure, and MTOE of the two brigades remained the same. The net effect of General Order 450 was the redesignation of the 18th Medical Brigade as the 44th Medical Brigade. Preservation of the 44th's distinguished history was the decisive factor in the inactivation of the 18th Medical Brigade and its replacement by the 44th Medical Brigade, previously operating in the Republic of Vietnam.

The following units were attached to the 44th Medical Brigade upon its activation:

- Headquarters and Headquarters Detachment, 44th Medical Brigade
- 10th Evacuation Hospital
- 28th General Hospital
- 157th Medical Laboratory
- 212th Medical Detachment (Helicopter Ambulance)
- 249th Medical Detachment (Supply)
- 591st Medical Company (Ambulance)
- 630th Medical Detachment (Maintenance)
- 702d Medical Company (Clearing)

The following attached units were inactivated on the dates indicated:

- 157th Medical Laboratory - Inactivated - 28 December 1970
- 28th General Hospital - Inactivated - 28 December 1970

==== Personnel ====
Officer strength as of 31 December 1970 was 40:

- Medical Service Corps - 25
- Army Nurse Corps - 1
- Warrant Officers - 14
  - Aviation - 11
  - Medical Service Corps - 1
  - Quartermaster Corps - 1
  - Corps of Engineers - 1

Officer strength as of 31 December 1971 was 48:

- Medical Service Corps - 33
- Army Nurse Corps - 1
- Warrant Officers - 14
  - Aviation - 12
  - Medical Service Corps - 1
  - Quartermaster Corps - 1

Total enlisted strength as of 31 December 1970 was 597.

Total enlisted strength as of 31 December 1971 was 379.

Personnel figures as of the end of 1970 showed the brigade was assigned approximately 125% of its assigned MTO strength. Excess personnel were generated as a result of the inactivation of the 28th General Hospital on 28 December 1970.

Personnel figures as of the end of 1971 reflect that at the end of the year, the Brigade was assigned approximately 75% of its MTOE authorized strength. The decrease of personnel was the result of the early release programs directed by the Department of the Army.

Due to an acute enlisted personnel shortage at the Fort Meade hospital, a request was submitted to the Commanding Officer, Fort George G. Meade, to attach the 44th Medical Brigade and all of its subordinate units to the Fort George G. Meade Medical Department Activity (Kimbrough Army Hospital). The request for attachment was not favorably considered.

==== Training ====
Units attached to the brigade were responsible for the scheduling and presentation of general, specialist, unit training, and the conduct of field exercises.

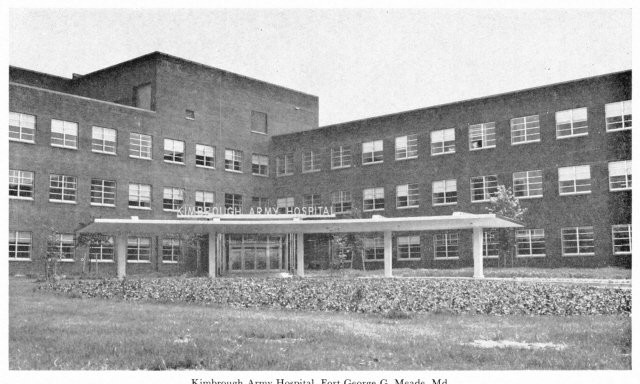
Kimbrough Army Hospital, where many enlisted members of the 44th Medical Brigade received MOS training while the brigade was stationed at Fort Meade, Maryland

The 44th Medical Brigade was tasked to provide 58 enlisted medical MOS slots for the operation of Kimbrough Army Hospital. In addition, the brigade coordinated an OJT/MOS proficiency program with Kimbrough Army Hospital, EPES Dental Clinic, First US Army Medical Laboratory, and the Walter Reed Army Institute of Research. Normally seventy to eighty personnel participated in this second program on a ninety-day rotating basis in 1970, which increased to eighty to ninety per rotation in 1971.

Funding deficiencies experienced by First Army made cancellation of all field training scheduled for the latter part of 1970 necessary.

The following units successfully completed an operational readiness training test during the period 30 April to 24 May 1971:

- 702d Medical Company (Clearing)
- 591st Medical Company (Ambulance)
- 212th Medical Detachment (Helicopter Ambulance)
- 249th Medical Detachment (Supply)
- 630th Medical Detachment (Maintenance)

The following units conducted a field training exercise during September 1971:

- 702d Medical Company (Clearing)
- 591st Medical Company (Ambulance)
- 249th Medical Detachment (Supply)
- 630th Medical Detachment (Maintenance)

The 44th Medical Brigade supported Reserve and ROTC Summer Camp during the period 6 March through 30 September 1971 at Indiantown Gap Military Reservation, Pennsylvania, Camps Pickett and A.P. Hill, Virginia, Camp Drum, New York, and Fort George G. Meade, Maryland. Support included medical subjects instruction, equipment and facility displays, medical evacuation (air and ground), billeting escort, and equipment.

The third annual Expert Field Medical Badge test was conducted in October 1971. Seven individuals received the award.

The following units participated in a Command Post Exercise on 20–27 December 1971:

- Headquarters and Headquarters Detachment, 44th Medical Brigade
- 10th Evacuation Hospital (Semi-mobile)
- 702d Medical Company (Clearing)
- 591st Medical Company (Ambulance)
- 212th Medical Detachment (Helicopter Ambulance)
- 249th Medical Detachment (Supply)
- 630th Medical Detachment (Maintenance)

==== Materiel ====
Logistical and maintenance support provided the brigade in 1970 and 1971 were considered adequate.

Implementation of "G" series medical MTOEs was only partially accomplished in 1970 because of restrictions placed on fund expenditures. Updates of all "G" series MTOEs were completed in 1971.

All subordinate unit small arms storage areas were consolidated at Brigade level in September 1971.

All units attached to the 44th Medical Brigade accomplished the changeover from M-14 to M-16 rifles during September 1971.

==== Patient care and evacuation ====
Brigade personnel are continuously involved in all areas of patient care through special programs mentioned in the Training section.

Both air and ground evacuation support of the First US Army/Military District of Washington area of operations was provided by units of the 44th Medical Brigade. Evacuation missions were performed in support of training and contingency operations.

==== Assistance provided civilian authorities ====
Elements of the 44th Medical Brigade provided medical and related support during the May 1971 demonstrations in Washington, D.C. Brigade personnel and equipment, configured as an ambulance company and provisional truck company, operated under the control of the Commanding General, Military District of Washington.

==== Brigade area ====
The brigade area was located in the 2400 area of Fort Meade. This area was bounded on the North by LLewellyn Avenue and on the West by Kimbrough Army Hospital. Occupying facilities constructed for World War II, none of the buildings remain, and 2022 Google Earth imagery shows the area occupied by parking lots and outbuildings supporting the Kimbrough Army Health Clinic, or returned to native vegetation.

==== 1972 ====
The 591st Medical Company (Ambulance) and the 414th Medical Detachment were both inactivated in June 1972.

On 23 June 1972, Hurricane Agnes struck a five-state area causing disaster of major proportions. Fort Meade was called upon to assist in a multitude of areas ranging from Search and Rescue operations to reconstruction of lines and communications in the stricken areas. The maximum troop strength committed was 286 personnel, the majority of which came from the 76th Engineer Battalion. Elements of the 1st Squadron, 6th Armored Cavalry, 42d Transportation Battalion, 44th Medical Brigade, and 519th Military Police Battalion were also deployed to assist civil authorities.

==== 1973 ====
A series of MTOE actions took place in 1973, including:

- The attachment of the 247th Medical Detachment to the 44th Medical Brigade on 12 February 1973
- The Inactivation of the 212th Medical Detachment (Helicopter Ambulance) on 29 March 1973
- The Reorganization and Redesignation of the 10th Evacuation Hospital as the 10th Combat Support Hospital on 21 March 1973

On 19 March 1973, the Headquarters and Headquarters Detachment, 44th Medical Brigade was inactivated at Fort Meade, Maryland.

=== The 44th Medical Brigade at Fort Bragg—Dragon Medics! ===
The brigade was reactivated on 21 September 1974 at Fort Bragg, North Carolina, assigned to the XVIII Airborne Corps. The 44th Medical Brigade deployed in support of XVIII Airborne Corps operations in Grenada, Panama, and Iraq, the last of which earned the brigade another Meritorious Unit Commendation. On 16 July 1992, the brigade became a separate major subordinate command with a general officer commanding. Following the reorganization, the 44th Medical Brigade participated in Operation Uphold Democracy, Operation Enduring Freedom, and most recently, Operation Iraqi Freedom. The brigade has also participated in hurricane relief efforts, including those following Hurricane Andrew, Hurricane Katrina, and Hurricane Rita. The brigade was converted to a Medical Command on 16 October 2001 and became a multi-component unit. While at Fort Bragg the brigade had become an Airborne unit, but as part of its conversion the 44th lost this designation. Only headquarters elements and a very limited number of its subordinate units had actually been on jump status, and the reorganization from a command back to a brigade removed headquarters elements from jump status. The unit was redesignated as the 44th Medical Brigade on 21 April 2010.

== Former commanders ==
Image	Rank	Name	Branch	Begin date	End date	Notes
	First Lieutenant	Byron L. Evans	MSC	7 January 1966	25 January 1966	First officer to report to the unit; assigned as aide to commanding general; assumed command by General Order Number 1, 44th Medical Brigade, 7 January 1966
	Lieutenant Colonel	John W. Hammett	MSC	25 January 1966	7 February 1966	On the brigade manning document, Hammett was assigned as the S-3. He would deploy to Vietnam in that position, and remain the S-3 until he rotated home on 8 April 1967.
	Colonel	Thomas P. Caito	MSC	7 February 1966	21 April 1966	On the brigade manning document, Caito was assigned as the Brigade Executive Officer. He was assigned to the position from the Directorate of Healthcare Operations, Office of the Surgeon General, and would return there upon completion of his tour in Vietnam.
	Colonel (P)	James A. Wier	MC	21 April 1966	13 June 1966	Wier, who had already been selected for promotion to brigadier general, was in Vietnam serving as the Surgeon of the 1st Logistics Command and met the Brigade Headquarters there when it deployed. After his promotion, he was reassigned as Command Surgeon, United States Army, Vietnam, rather than continuing in command, as had been the original plan upon the brigade's deployment
	Colonel	Ray L. Miller	MC	13 June 1966	29 May 1967	
	Colonel	Frederick W. Timmerman	MC	29 May 1967	11 July 1967	
	Brigadier General	Glenn J. Collins	MC	11 July 1967	1 August 1968	Collins would later serve as Deputy Surgeon General and Commander of Walter Reed Army Medical Center. In 1943, he commanded the 1st Medical Regiment
	Brigadier General	Spurgeon H. Neel, Jr.	MC	1 August 1968	1 February 1969	Spurgeon Neel helped select the UH-1 for use by the Army. He would later go on to serve as the Deputy Surgeon General and first Commanding General of the United States Army Health Services Command
	Brigadier General	Hal B. Jennings	MC	1 February 1969	3 June 1969	Jennings was selected for promotion and assignment as Deputy Surgeon General and, before leaving Vietnam, for appointment as Surgeon General, replacing retiring Lieutenant General Leonard D. Heaton. Although selected for promotion to major general, he never actually wore the rank, instead being promoted directly to lieutenant general.
	Brigadier General	David E. Thomas	MC	3 June 1969	2 December 1970	Thomas made two combat jumps as a battalion surgeon with the 82d Airborne Division in World War II. Although he commanded the Brigade until it redeployed on 2 December 1970, the headquarters had been taken to zero strength and he had assumed command of the US Army Medical Command, Vietnam (Provisional) on 1 March 1970.
	Colonel	Leigh F. Wheeler	MSC	16 December 1970	February 1972	Colonel Wheeler assumed command of the 44th Medical Brigade at Fort Meade, Maryland when the 18th Medical Brigade was reflagged as the 44th.
	Colonel	William R. Knowles	MSC	February 1972	19 March 1973	
				19 March 1973	21 September 1974	Brigade inactivated
	Colonel	Robert E. Mathias	MSC	21 September 1974	July 1976	Assumed command when the 55th Medical Group was reflagged as the 44th Medical Brigade at Fort Bragg, North Carolina on 21 September 1974.
	Colonel	France F. Jordan	MSC	July 1976	December 1977	Later promoted to brigadier general and appointed Chief, Medical Service Corps.
	Colonel	Thomas L. Trudeau	MSC	December 1977	July 1980	Trudeau also served as the S-1 for the Brigade in 1969 and 1970 in Vietnam
	Colonel	John W. Lowe	MSC	July 1980	June 1983	
	Colonel	Jack R. Wilson II	MSC	June 1983	July 1985	
	Colonel	Bruce T. Miketinac	MSC	July 1985	July 1987	Later promoted to brigadier general and appointed Chief, Medical Service Corps.
	Colonel	Thomas C. Scofield	MSC	July 1987	June 1989	
	Colonel	Jerome V. Foust	MSC	June 1989	October 1991	As a 1LT in the 54th Medical Detachment (Helicopter Ambulance), Foust was one of Major Patrick Henry Brady's co-pilots on the days he earned both his Medal of Honor and his Distinguished Service Cross. Commanded the Brigade on its deployments in support of Operation Just Cause, Operation Desert Shield, and Operation Desert Storm. Later promoted to brigadier general and appointed Chief, Medical Service Corps.
	Colonel	Myung H. Kim	MSC	October 1991	April 1992	Assumed command of the 55th Medical Group upon the Brigade's conversion to a flag-level command; obtained paid parachutist positions for the brigade in support of all medical battlefield operating systems.
James B. Peake	Brigadier general	James B. Peake	MC	April 1992	November 1994	Later Surgeon General of the United States Army and Secretary of the Department of Veterans Affairs
Harold G. Timboe	Brigadier general	Harold L. Timboe	MC	November 1994	March 1997	Later commanded Walter Reed Army Medical Center
Darrel R. Porr	Brigadier general	Darrel R. Porr	MC	May 1999	September 2000	
Kenneth L. Farmer, Jr.	Brigadier general	Kenneth L. Farmer, Jr.	MC	May 1999	September 2000	Later commanded Walter Reed Army Medical Center
	Colonel	Edgar B. "Butch" Murphy	MSC	September 2000	April 2001	By MTOE, Colonel Murphy held the position of Chief of Staff of the Brigade
	Brigadier general	C. William Fox, Jr.	MC	April 2001	16 October 2001	
				16 October 2001		Redesignated 44th Medical Command
	Brigadier general	C. William Fox, Jr.	MC	16 October 2001	July 2003	
George W. Weightman	Brigadier general	George W. Weightman	MC	July 2003	3 July 2004	Later commanded Walter Reed Army Medical Center; United States Army Medical Research and Materiel Command
	Brigadier general	Elder Granger	MC	3 July 2004	December 2005	Later Deputy Director, Tricare Management Agency
	Brigadier general	Phillip Volpe	MC	December 2005	January 2008	Later Deputy Commander, Joint Task Force National Capital Region Medical; Army Medical Department Center and School
	Colonel	Ronald A. Maul	MC	January 2008	24 April 2010	Cased the Medical Command colors; removed the Brigade's maroon berets, background flashes, and ovals.
				24 April 2010		Redesignated 44th Medical Brigade
	Colonel	Donald R. West	MSC	24 April 2010	June 2012	
	Colonel	Jeffrey J. Johnson	MC	June 2012	June 2014	Promoted to Brigadier General 2 June 2016.
	Colonel	Michael J. Talley	MSC	June 2014	June 2016	Promoted to Brigadier General 2 July 2016; promoted to Major General 29 April 2021.
	Colonel	Paula C. Lodi	MSC	June 2016	July 2018	Promoted to Brigadier General 2 June 2019; promoted to Major General 3 February 2023.
	Colonel	Kimberlee K. Aiello	MSC	July 2018	10 July 2020	
	Colonel	Jamie Burk	NC	10 July 2020	12 July 2022	First Army Nurse Corps Officer to command the brigade. Promoted to Brigadier General 3 April 2024.

== Former command sergeants major ==
Image	Rank	Name	Begin date	End date	Notes
	Sergeant major	Albert J. Kippes	January 1966	April 1967	After redeploying from Vietnam, Kippes was selected for Command sergeant major by the Army's first centralized Command sergeant major selection board.
					Gap in data
	Command sergeant major	Bernard J. Ings	1 April 1968		Inges was selected for Command sergeant major by the Army's second centralized Command sergeant major board. Already serving in Vietnam as the Sergeant major of the 6th Convalescent Center, he was the first medical Command sergeant major to serve in Vietnam and was moved to the Brigade headquarters upon his appointment.
					Gap in data
	Command sergeant major	Henry M. Church, Jr.	1969	1970	CSM Church had been the CSM of the 43d Medical Group until the 3d quarter of 1969, when he was moved to the brigade headquarters.
					Gap in data
	Command sergeant major	Alfred DeBaun	16 December 1970	December 1971	The Brigade colors returned from Vietnam in December 1970. DeBaun was the CSM of the 18th Medical Brigade at Fort George G. Meade, Maryland and became the CSM of the 44th when the 18th was reflagged on 16 December.
	Command sergeant major	Robert H. Lunceford, Jr.	December 1971	19 March 1973	CSM Lunceford was the Brigade CSM until the unit inactivated on 19 March 1973
			19 March 1973	21 September 1974	Brigade inactivated
	Command sergeant major	Vardman J. Gann	21 September 1974	2 September 1975	
	Command sergeant major	Floyd Ronald	2 September 1975		
					Gap in data
	Command sergeant major	Woodrow Richardson Jr.		August 1987	
	Command sergeant major	David C. Luther	August 1987	March 1991	
	Command sergeant major	James E. Hosborough	March 1991	1 October 1992	Upon reactivation of the 55th Medical Group, CSM Hosbrough was reassigned as the group CSM
	Command sergeant major	Raymond Munn	1 October 1992	1994	
	Command sergeant major	James E. Hosborough	1994	15 September 1996	Upon the departure of CSM Munn, CSM Hosbrough was reassigned from the 55th Medical Group to once again become the brigade Command sergeant major, now serving in a general officer-level command.
	Command sergeant major	Kenneth Cannon	15 September 1996	February 1998	
	Command sergeant major	Adolph M. Arista	February 1998	February 1999	
	Command sergeant major	Raymond J. Ashmore	February 1999	16 October 2001	
			16 October 2001		Redesignated 44th Medical Command
	Command sergeant major	Raymond J. Ashmore	16 October 2001	2004	
	Command sergeant major	William P. Franklin	2004	2006	
	Command sergeant major	Tuileama Nua	2006	16 October 2008	
	Command sergeant major	Edwin Perez	16 October 2008	April 2010	
			24 April 2010		Redesignated 44th Medical Brigade
	Command sergeant major	Iteago Felton	April 2010	12 June 2012	
	Command sergeant major	Stephen Maldonado	12 June 2012	12 June 2014	
	Command sergeant major	Roger A. Velarde	12 June 2014	December 2014	
	Command sergeant major	Gregory M. Lott	2014	May 2016	
			May 2016	August 2016	Vacant
	Command sergeant major	Kristopher Rick	August 2016	3 April 2018	
	Command sergeant major	Fergus Joseph	10 August 2018	10 August 2020	
	Command sergeant major	Heidi Johnson	10 August 2020	12 July 2022	

== Insignia ==
=== Shoulder sleeve insignia ===
Shoulder Sleeve Insignia, 44th Medical Brigade

- Description: On a white shield within a 1/8 inch (0.32 cm) white border 2 inches (5.1 cm) in width overall a four-pointed gold star (with longer vertical points) superimposed on a maroon four-pointed star (points saltirewise and all of equal length) between two maroon flanks.
- Symbolism:
1. Maroon and white are the colors used for the Army Medical Service.
2. The gold star superimposed over the maroon star is symbolic of the unit's mission of command and control over medical units.
3. The four points of each taken together allude to the organization's numerical designation.
- Background:
1. This insignia was originally approved for the 44th Medical Brigade on 5 October 1966.
2. The shoulder sleeve insignia was redesignated for the 44th Medical Command on 6 August 2001.
3. The insignia was redesignated for the 44th Medical Brigade with the description updated effective 16 April 2010.
- From 1995 to 2010, members of the brigade wore a blue airborne tab with white lettering above their shoulder sleeve insignia. While sanctioned by the XVIII Airborne Corps, the tab was never approved for wear by the United States Army Institute of Heraldry.

=== Distinctive unit insignia ===
Distinctive Unit Insignia, 44th Medical Brigade

- Description: A silver color metal and enamel device 1 1/8 inches (2.9 cm) in diameter consisting of a silver saltire (cross), the four arms equal and with straight ends, surmounted by a maroon cross, the four arms equal and with arched ends.
- Symbolism: Maroon and white (silver) are the colors used for the Army Medical Service and the two crosses refer to the medical and surgical mission of the organization while the four arms of each cross taken together signify the organization's numerical designation.
- Background:
1. This insignia was originally approved for the 44th Medical Brigade on 12 August 1966.
2. The distinctive unit insignia was redesignated for the 44th Medical Command on 6 August 2001.
3. The insignia was redesignated for the 44th Medical Brigade with the description updated effective 16 April 2010.

=== Beret flash ===
44th Medical Brigade Beret Flash

- Description: On a maroon shield-shaped embroidered item with a semi-circular base 2 1/4 inches (5.7 cm) in height and 1 7/8 inches (4.8 cm) in width overall and edged with a 1/8 inch (0.32 cm) white border, a white vertical lozenge on the vertical center line.
- Background:
1. This insignia was originally approved for the 44th Medical Brigade on 1 August 1995.
2. The beret flash was canceled by the Institute of Heraldry effective 16 August 2010.
3. Colors: White #67101; Maroon #67114
4. Institute of Heraldry drawing number A-4-163.

=== Background trimming ===
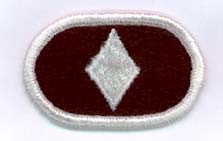
44th Medical Brigade Background Trimming

- Description: On a maroon oval-shaped embroidered item 1 3/8 inches (3.5 cm) in height and 2 1/4 inches (5.7 cm) in width edged with a 1/8 inch (0.32 cm) white border, a white vertical lozenge on the vertical center line.
- Background:
1. This insignia was originally approved for the 44th Medical Brigade on 1 August 1995.
2. The background trimming was canceled by the Institute of Heraldry effective 16 August 2010.
3. Colors: White #67101; Maroon #67114.
4. Institute of Heraldry drawing number A-6-181.

== Subordinate units ==
=== Vietnam (as of 1 July 1969) ===
44th Medical Brigade

- 658th Medical Company Team AC (Company Headquarters)
- 9th Medical Laboratory
  - 1st Medical Laboratory (Mobile)
  - 74th Medical Laboratory (Mobile)
  - 316th Medical Detachment Team NC (Blood Distribution)
  - 188th Medical Detachment Team PA (Medical Illustration)
- 32nd Medical Depot
  - 1st Advance Platoon 32nd Medical Depot
  - 2nd Advance Platoon 32nd Medical Depot
  - 4th Advance Platoon 32nd Medical Depot
  - 482nd Medical Detachment Team GD (Medical Equip Maintenance)
  - 507th Medical Detachment Team FC (Supply)
  - 545th Medical Detachment Team FC (Supply)
  - 666th Medical Detachment Team GA (Optical)
- 43rd Medical Group
  - Headquarters & Headquarters Detachment 55th Medical Group (Preparing to inactivate)
  - 61st Medical Battalion
    - 128th Medical Detachment Team OA (Dispensary)
    - 136th Medical Detachment Team MA (Dispensary)
    - 221st Medical Detachment Team MB (Dispensary)
    - 241st Medical Detachment Team MB (Dispensary)
    - 349th Medical Detachment Team MB (Dispensary)
    - 418th Medical Company (Ambulance)
    - 568th Medical Company (Clearing) (-)
  - 105th Medical Detachment Team LA (Preventive Medicine Control)
  - 6th Convalescent Center
  - 8th Field Hospital
    - 67th Medical Detachment Team KF (Thoracic)
    - 98th Medical Detachment Team KO (Psychiatric)
    - 551st Medical Detachment Team KH (X-Ray)
    - 575th Medical Detachment Team MB (Dispensary)
    - 933rd Medical Detachment Team KE (Neurosurgical)
    - 745th Medical Detachment Team KA (Surgical)
    - 440th Medical Detachment Team RB (Ambulance)
  - 498th Medical Company (Air Ambulance)
    - 283rd Medical Detachment (RA) (Helicopter Ambulance)
    - 254th Medical Detachment (RA) (Helicopter Ambulance)
  - 70th Medical Battalion
    - 126th Medical Detachment Team OA (Dispensary)
    - 1st Medical Company (Ambulance)
    - 7th Medical Detachment Team MA (Dispensary)
    - 14th Medical Detachment Team MC (Dispensary)
    - 51st Medical Company (Ambulance)
    - 152nd Medical Detachment Team MA (Dispensary)
    - 438th Medical Detachment Team RE (Bus Ambulance)
    - 142nd Medical Detachment Team HA (Dispensary)
    - 17th Field Hospital
      - 139th Medical Detachment Team KB (Orthopedic)
      - 435th Medical Detachment Team KA (Surgical)
      - 463rd Medical Detachment Team KH (X-Ray)
      - 542nd Medical Company (Clearing)
  - 67th Evacuation Hospital
  - 71st Evacuation Hospital
    - 210th Medical Detachment Team MC (Dispensary)
    - 240th Medical Detachment Team KF (Thoracic)
  - 311th Field Hospital
- 67th Medical Group
  - 18th Surgical Hospital (Mobile Army)
    - 500th Medical Detachment Team RB (Ambulance)
  - 237th Medical Detachment (RA) (Helicopter Ambulance)
  - 22nd Surgical Hospital (Mobile Army)
    - 616th Medical Company (Clearing)
    - 874th Medical Detachment Team RB (Ambulance)
    - 313th Medical Detachment Team KA (Surgical)
  - 85th Evacuation Hospital
    - 563rd Medical Company (Clearing)
    - 472nd Medical Detachment Team RB (Ambulance)
  - 571st Medical Detachment (RA) (Helicopter Ambulance)
  - 74th Medical Battalion
    - 27th Surgical Hospital (Mobile Army)
    - 238th Medical Detachment Team KA (Surgical)
    - 520th Medical Company (Clearing)
    - 915th Medical Detachment Team RH (X-Ray)
  - 91st Evacuation Hospital
    - 48th Medical Detachment Team KA (Surgical)
    - 138th Medical Detachment Team KE (Neurosurgical)
  - 566th Medical Company (Ambulance)
  - 54th Medical Detachment (RA) (Helicopter Ambulance)
    - 68th Medical Detachment (RA) (Helicopter Ambulance)
  - 95th Evacuation Hospital
    - 161st Medical Detachment Team OA (Dispensary)
    - 501st Medical Detachment Team MA (Dispensary)
  - 236th Medical Detachment (RA) (Helicopter Ambulance)
  - 312th Evacuation Hospital
    - 305th Medical Detachment Team KB (Orthopedic)
    - 378th Medical Detachment Team KE (Neurosurgical)
    - 889th Medical Detachment Team KA (Surgical)
- 68th Medical Group
  - 667th Medical Company Team AC (Company Headquarters)
  - 20th Preventive Medicine Unit (Service) (Field)
    - 61st Medical Detachment Team LB (Preventive Medicine Survey)
  - 2d Surgical Hospital (Mobile Army)
  - 3rd Field Hospital (Headquarters & 1 Hospital Unit)
    - 51st Field Hospital (Headquarters & 2 Hospital Units)
    - 62nd Medical Detachment Team KA (Surgical)
    - 155th Medical Detachment Team KF (Thoracic)
    - 218th Medical Detachment Team MC (Dispensary)
    - 229th Medical Detachment Team MC (Dispensary)
    - 629th Medical Detachment Team KP (Renal)
    - 673rd Medical Detachment Team OA (Dispensary)
  - 3rd Surgical Hospital (Mobile Army)
  - 7th Surgical Hospital (Mobile Army)
  - 12th Evacuation Hospital
  - 24th Evacuation Hospital
    - 45th Medical Detachment Team KB (Orthopedic)
  - 29th Evacuation Hospital
    - 43rd Medical Detachment Team RB (Ambulance)
    - 346th Medical Detachment Team MA (Dispensary)
  - 36th Evacuation Hospital
    - 345th Medical Detachment Team MB (Dispensary)
    - 872nd Medical Detachment Team RB (Ambulance)
  - 45th Surgical Hospital
  - 45th Medical Company (Air Ambulance) (-)
    - 57th Medical Detachment (RA) (Helicopter Ambulance)
    - 82nd Medical Detachment (RA) (Helicopter Ambulance)
    - 159th Medical Detachment (RA) (Helicopter Ambulance)
    - 247th Medical Detachment (RA) (Helicopter Ambulance)
    - 551st Transportation Corps Detachment, Cargo Helicopter Forward Maintenance
  - 58th Medical Battalion
    - 50th Medical Company (Clearing)
    - 584th Medical Company (Ambulance)
    - 439th Medical Detachment Team RE (Bus Ambulance)
    - 2nd Medical Detachment Team MA (Dispensary)
    - 16th Medical Detachment Team MA (Dispensary)
    - 25th Medical Detachment Team MA (Dispensary)
    - 61st Medical Detachment Team MB (Dispensary)
    - 84th Medical Detachment Team OA (Dispensary)
    - 133rd Medical Detachment Team OA (Dispensary)
    - 185th Medical Detachment Team MA (Dispensary)
    - 194th Medical Detachment Team MC (Dispensary)
    - 202nd Medical Detachment Team MA (Dispensary)
    - 332nd Medical Detachment Team MB (Dispensary)
    - 54lst Medical Detachment Team MA (Dispensary)
    - 561st Medical Company (Ambulance)
      - 498th Medical Detachment Team RE (Bus Ambulance)
    - 930th Medical Detachment Team MB (Dispensary)
  - 74th Field Hospital
  - 93rd Evacuation Hospital
    - 46th Medical Detachment Team KB (Orthopedic)
    - 53rd Medical Detachment Team KA (Surgical)
    - 935th Medical Detachment Team KO (Psychiatric)
- 172nd Preventive Medicine Unit (Service) (Field)
  - 3rd Medical Detachment Team LA (Preventive Medicine Control)
  - 926th Medical Detachment Team LB (Preventive Medicine Survey)
- 222nd Personnel Services Company (Type B)
  - Team A
  - Team B
  - Team C
  - Team D
- 522nd Medical Detachment Team AF (Veterinary Professional Services)
  - 4th Medical Detachment Team JB (Veterinary Services, Large)
  - 75th Medical Detachment Team JA (Veterinary Services, Small)
  - 175th Medical Detachment Team JB (Veterinary Services, Large)
  - 176th Medical Detachment Team JB (Veterinary Services, Large)
  - 245th Medical Detachment Team JB (Veterinary Services, Large)
  - 359th Medical Detachment Team IE (Veterinary Small Animal Dispensary)
  - 459th Medical Detachment Team IE (Veterinary Small Animal Dispensary)
  - 504th Medical Detachment Team IE (Veterinary Small Animal Dispensary)
  - 760th Medical Detachment Team JB (Veterinary Services, Large)
  - 764th Medical Detachment Team IE (Veterinary Small Animal Dispensary)
  - 936th Medical Detachment Team ID (Vet Small Animal Hospital)
- 932nd Medical Detachment Team AI (Headquarters, Dental Professional Services)
  - 36th Medical Detachment Team KJ (Dental Services)
  - 38th Medical Detachment Team KJ (Dental Services)
  - 39th Medical Detachment Team KJ (Dental Services)
  - 40th Medical Detachment Team KJ (Dental Services)
  - 56th Medical Detachment Team KJ (Dental Services)
  - 137th Medical Detachment Team KJ (Dental Services)
  - 219th Medical Detachment Team KJ (Dental Services)
  - 257th Medical Detachment Team KJ (Dental Services)
  - 437th Medical Detachment Team KJ (Dental Services)
  - 499th Medical Detachment Team KJ (Dental Services)
  - 518th Medical Detachment Team KJ (Dental Services)
  - 934th Medical Detachment Team KJ (Dental Services)
  - 650th Medical Detachment Team KJ (Dental Services)

=== Southwest Asia ===
Operation Desert Shield

- Headquarters Company, 44th Medical Brigade
- 1st Medical Group
  - 41st Combat Support Hospital
  - 46th Combat Support Hospital
  - 47th Combat Support Hospital
  - 34th Medical Battalion
    - 498th Medical Company (Air Ambulance)
    - 36th Medical Detachment (RG)--UH-60 Aircraft
    - 57th Medical Detachment (RG)--UH-60 Aircraft
    - 82nd Medical Detachment (RA)--UH-1 Aircraft
    - 440th Medical Detachment (RE)
  - 85th Medical Battalion
    - 517th Medical Company (Clearing)
    - 547th Medical Company (Clearing)
    - 595th Medical Company (Clearing)
    - 702nd Medical Company (Clearing)
    - 690th Medical Company (Ambulance)
- 62nd Medical Group
  - 5th Mobile Army Surgical Hospital
  - 28th Combat Support Hospital
    - 250th Medical Detachment (KB)
  - 85th Evacuation Hospital
    - 359th Medical Detachment (KB)
  - 86th Evacuation Hospital
    - 252nd Medical Detachment (KE)
  - 47th Field Hospital
  - 36th Medical Battalion
    - 36th Medical Company (Clearing)
    - 423rd Medical Company (Clearing)
    - 274th Medical Detachment (KA)
    - 945th Medical Detachment (OA)
  - 56th Medical Battalion
  - 429th Medical Company (ABN) (Ambulance)
    - 45th Medical Company (Air Ambulance)
    - 229th Medical Detachment (RA)--UH-60 Aircraft
    - 431st Medical Detachment (RA)--UH-60 Aircraft
- 32nd Medical Supply, Optical, and Maintenance (MEDSOM) Battalion and 47th Medical Supply, Optical, and Maintenance (MEDSOM) Battalion (operated combined facility)
  - 5th Medical Detachment (GA)
  - 49th Medical Detachment (EB)
  - 135th Medical Detachment (NC)
  - 155th Medical Detachment (BD)
  - 249th Medical Detachment (BB)
  - 665th Medical Detachment (Bld)
- 74th Medical Detachment (AM)--Preventive Medicine Headquarters
  - 714th Medical Detachment (LA)
  - 61st Medical Detachment (LB)
  - 224th Medical Detachment (LB)
  - 925th Medical Detachment (LB)
  - 105th Medical Detachment (LC)
  - 227th Medical Detachment (LD)
- 483rd Medical Detachment (JB)--Veterinary Medicine Headquarters
  - 73rd Medical Detachment (JA)
  - 248th Medical Detachment (JA)
- 257th Medical Detachment (HA)--Dental

Operation Desert Storm

- Headquarters Company, 44th Medical Brigade
- 1st Medical Group
  - 2nd Mobile Army Surgical Hospital
  - 5th Mobile Army Surgical Hospital
    - 755th Medical Detachment (KA)
  - 10th Mobile Army Surgical Hospital
  - 28th Combat Support Hospital
    - 250th Medical Detachment (KB)
  - 41st Combat Support Hospital
  - 46th Combat Support Hospital
  - 47th Combat Support Hospital
  - 34th Medical Battalion
    - 498th Medical Company (Air Ambulance)
    - 690th Medical Company (Ambulance)
    - 36th Medical Detachment (RG)--UH-60 Aircraft
    - 57th Medical Detachment (RG)--UH-60 Aircraft
    - 82nd Medical Detachment (RA)--UH-1 Aircraft
    - 374th Medical Detachment (RA)--UH-1 Aircraft
  - 85th Medical Battalion
    - 517th Medical Company (Clearing)
    - 547th Medical Company (Clearing)
    - 595th Medical Company (Clearing)
    - 702nd Medical Company (Clearing)
    - 685th Medical Company (Ambulance)
    - 440th Medical Detachment (RE)
  - 274th Medical Detachment (KA)
  - 248th Medical Detachment (JA)
  - 628th Medical Detachment (OM)
- 62nd Medical Group
  - 15th Evacuation Hospital
  - 44th Evacuation Hospital
  - 86th Evacuation Hospital
    - 262nd Medical Detachment (KE)
  - 93rd Evacuation Hospital
    - 366th Medical Detachment (KE)
  - 109th Evacuation Hospital
  - 36th Medical Battalion
    - 36th Medical Company (Clearing)
    - 423rd Medical Company (Clearing)
    - 514th Medical Company (Ambulance)
    - 945th Medical Detachment (OA)
  - 56th Medical Battalion
    - 24th Medical Company (Air Ambulance)
    - 429th Medical Company (ABN) (Ambulance)
    - 229th Medical Detachment (RA)--UH-1 Aircraft
    - 347th Medical Detachment (RA)--UH-1 Aircraft
    - 431st Medical Detachment (RA)--UH-1 Aircraft
- 32nd Medical Supply, Optical, and Maintenance (MEDSOM) Battalion
  - 5th Medical Detachment (GA)
  - 135th Medical Detachment (NC)
  - 249th Medical Detachment (BB)
- 74th Medical Detachment (AM)--Preventive Medicine Headquarters
  - 61st Medical Detachment (LB)
  - 224th Medical Detachment (LB)
  - 925th Medical Detachment (LB)
  - 227th Medical Detachment (LD)
- 257th Medical Detachment (HA)--Dental

=== Iraq 2004-2005 ===
- Headquarters Company, 44th Medical Command
- 86th Combat Support Hospital
- 228th Combat Support Hospital
- 32nd Medical Battalion
- 36th Medical Battalion
- 261st Medical Battalion
- 36th Medical Company
- 54th Medical Company
- 128th Medical Company
- 141st Medical Company
- 313th Medical Company
- 464th Medical Company
- 546th Medical Company
- 547th Medical Company
- 581st Medical Company
- 1065th Medical Company
- 1159th Medical Company
- 12th Medical Detachment
- 43D Medical Detachment
- 44th Medical Detachment
- 55th Medical Detachment
- 102D Medical Detachment
- 155th Medical Detachment
- 373D Medical Detachment
- 555th Medical Detachment
- 571st Medical Detachment
- 745th Medical Detachment
- 793D Medical Detachment
- 988th Medical Detachment

=== Iraq 2008-2009 (incomplete) ===
- Headquarters Company, 44th Medical Command
- 421st Medical Battalion
  - 165th Medical Detachment
  - 166th Medical Detachment
  - 176th Medical Detachment
  - 207th Medical Detachment
  - 215th Medical Company
  - 256th Medical Company
  - 360th Medical Detachment
  - 4645th Medical Company
  - 507th Medical Detachment
  - 520th Medical Company
  - 601st Medical Company
  - 690th Medical Company
  - 996th Medical Company

=== Current ===
Units of the 44th Medical Brigade:

- Headquarters & Headquarters Company, Fort Bragg
- 16th Hospital Center, Fort Bragg, NC
  - 528th Field Hospital
- 261st Medical Battalion (Multifunctional), Fort Bragg, NC
- 531st Hospital Center, Fort Campbell, KY
  - 586th Field Hospital
- 6th Medical Logistics Management Center, Fort Detrick, MD
- 1st Global Field Medical Laboratory, Aberdeen Proving Ground, MD
