= James S. Ketchum =

American psychiatrist (1931–2019)

James Sanford Ketchum (November 1, 1931 – May 27, 2019) was a psychiatrist and U.S. Army Medical Corps officer who worked for almost a decade (1960–1969) on the U.S. military’s top secret psychochemical warfare program at the Edgewood Arsenal, Maryland, which researched chemicals to be used to "incapacitate the minds" of adversaries.

== Biography ==
=== Youth and education ===
Ketchum was born in Manhattan and brought up in Brooklyn and Queens. After graduating from Forest Hills High School, he attended Dartmouth College before receiving his undergraduate degree from Columbia University in 1952. In 1956, he received his M.D. degree from Cornell Medical School. He joined the Army that year and served his internship at Letterman Army Hospital in San Francisco (1956–57). After a psychiatry residency at the Walter Reed Army Medical Center in Washington, D.C. (1957–59), he was granted board certification in that specialty and joined researchers at the Walter Reed Army Institute of Research.

=== Career ===
In 1960, Ketchum agreed to an unconventional assignment at Edgewood Arsenal in Maryland and spent most of the next decade (1960–66; 1968–69) testing over a dozen potential "incapacitating agents", including LSD, BZ and cannabis derivatives. He played a pivotal role in psychoactive drug testing of hundreds of military volunteers — known rather prosaically as the "Medical Research Volunteer Program" — a story kept highly classified for almost fifty years until his memoir was published in 2006.

In 1964, Ketchum oversaw an important field test at the Dugway Proving Ground, in Utah. The test, code-named Project DORK, was intended to determine if an aerosol of the delirium-inducing BZ could incapacitate soldiers at distances of 500–1000 yards. Ketchum directed an army film documenting the effort called Cloud of Confusion (1964).

Ketchum had additional psychiatric training during a fellowship at Stanford University in California (1966–68); during this period, he volunteered at the Haight Ashbury Free Clinics in nearby San Francisco (he did not tell his hippie patients he was an Army doctor). He then returned to Edgewood for a final year; this was followed by tours at Fort Sam Houston (1971–73) and Fort Benning (1973–76).

=== Post-military ===
After leaving Army service as a colonel in 1976, Ketchum became an associate professor at the University of Texas Medical School and later an assistant clinical professor at the University of California, Los Angeles. As a civilian, Ketchum acquired broad experience in the area of alcohol and drug abuse and published numerous scientific articles and book chapters. His activities at teaching hospitals included many invited lectures, seminars and the direct supervision of medical students. As a clinician, he spent 30 years in hospital and outpatient settings, as well as community clinics and residential treatment centers.

Following his retirement, Ketchum resided in Santa Rosa, California until moving to Peoria, Arizona after the Tubbs Fire (2017) came within a few blocks of his home. He was a lifelong friend of Sasha Shulgin.

Ketchum died in Peoria at the age of 87 on May 27, 2019. He was survived by his fifth wife, Judy Ketchum, and two children.

== Works ==
- Ketchum, James S.; Sidell, Frederick R. (1997). "Incapacitating Agents". In Borden Institute (ed.). Medical Aspects of Chemical and Biological Warfare. Textbook of Military Medicine. Washington, DC: US Government Printing Office. Archived from the original (PDF) on 2012-08-26.
- Ketchum, James S. (2006). Chemical Warfare: Secrets Almost Forgotten. ChemBooks Inc. pp. 380pp. ISBN 978-1-4243-0080-8. "A Personal Story of Medical Testing of Army Volunteers with Incapacitating Chemical Agents During the Cold War (1955-1975)"

== See also ==
- Edgewood Arsenal human experiments
- David Rioch
- Incapacitating agent
