= William Borden =

William Borden is the name of:

- William Whiting Borden (1887–1913), American philanthropist and missionary
- William Cline Borden (1858–1934), American surgeon and planner of Walter Reed Army Medical Center
- William L. Borden (1920–1985), American congressional aide and figure in the Oppenheimer security case
