= James Ketchum =

James Ketchum may refer to:

- James S. Ketchum (1931–2019), psychiatrist and United States Army Medical Corps officer
- James R. Ketchum, White House Curator
