= War Surgery in Afghanistan and Iraq: A Series of Cases, 2003–2007 =

2008 medical textbook published by the U.S. Army

- Author: Shawn Christian Nessen, Dave Edmond Lounsbury, and Stephen P. Hetz, (editors)
- Language: English
- Subject: Military medicine
- Publisher: United States Army and Borden Institute
- Publication date: 2008
- Publication place: United States
- Pages: 464
- ISBN: 0-9818228-0-0
- OCLC: 213480125

War Surgery in Afghanistan and Iraq: A Series of Cases, 2003–2007 is a medical textbook published in July 2008 by the United States Army and the Walter Reed Army Medical Center's Borden Institute, with a foreword by reporter Bob Woodruff, who was severely injured in the Iraq War in 2006. It has 83 case descriptions, focusing on new methods of treating blast trauma and penetrating wounds. The book includes graphic and controversial photographs of traumatic battle injuries to U.S. military members and civilians.

== Publishing and attempted censorship ==
In 2008, some in the U.S. Army Medical Department sought to censor the book and keep it out of civilian hands, largely due to the graphic nature of some of its photographic content, specifically gruesome photos of war wounds which might be used for political purposes. The editors are Dr. Shawn Christian Nessen; Dr. Dave Edmond Lounsbury, Developmental Editor; and Dr. Stephen P. Hetz; all serving or former medical officers. Graphic design was by Christine Gamboa-Onrubia. Many of the non-clinical photographs in the book were taken by David Leeson of the Dallas Morning News. By August 2008, it had reached the number 67 position among bestselling books and was the top-selling book on surgery at Amazon.com.

Cases of war trauma from Afghanistan and Iraq are presented, the forward management of which was outlined in the handbook "Emergency War Surgery, Third United States Revision" (2004) and with which this textbook is intended to be paired. It is an edited work consisting of more than 70 trauma surgery cases illustrated with amateur digital photos taken by the deployed attending surgeons and staff. Contributors of cases and commentary number 68; almost all were, or still are, serving Army Medical Officers. Cases are categorized according to type of injury (e.g. soft-tissue & burns, bone, vascular) or anatomical region (face & neck, brain & spine, chest, abdomen). There is a comprehensive Appendix that includes state-of-the-art Clinical Practice Guidelines.

The textbook is first and foremost devoted to the acute management of the polytrauma (blast, burns, and high-velocity penetrating injuries) unique to the modern battlefield. Due to Defense Department proscriptions against the publication of certain photographs from both conflicts, however, the book unintentionally assumed a second role: its graphic photographs revealing the human cost of war. None is used gratuitously, but it is in this latter role, as historical record, that the book may have lasting value after its medical-technical purpose becomes obsolete.

The role and appropriateness of war photography for civilian audiences are contentious issues and have been discussed elsewhere with specific reference to this textbook, including "The War We Don't Want to See" by Sue Halpern and "From Goya to Afghanistan – an essay on the ratio and ethics of medical war pictures" by Leo van Bergen.

The textbook has had numerous favorable reviews in the peer literature (Journal of the American Medical Association, New England Journal of Medicine, Wilderness & Environmental Medicine). Unusual for a medical textbook, however, it has also been reviewed in lay publications (The New York Times, The Economist, The New York Review of Books). It won a national book award from the American Medical Writers Association in November 2009.

Dedicated "To Service", implicit is a tribute to the officers and enlisted of the Army Medical Corps who deployed to the conflicts in South Asia with Mobile Army Surgical Hospital (MASH) or Combat Support Hospital (CSH).

Stephen Hetz stated that he always felt that the book would ultimately not be suppressed. "[Unlike Lounsbury] There was never any doubt in my mind that the Army would publish this," he said. "It was just a matter of getting around the nitwits."
