= James Denver Glennan =

United States Army general

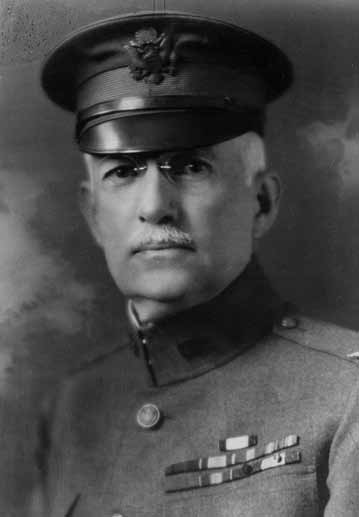
- Brigadier General James D. Glennan, Medical Corps, United States Army.
- Born: March 2, 1862; Rochester, New York, United States
- Died: December 24, 1927 (aged 65); Walter Reed Army Medical Center, Washington, D.C.
- Burial place: Arlington National Cemetery, Arlington County, Virginia
- Military career
- Allegiance: United States
- Branch: United States Army
- Service years: 1888–1927
- Rank: Brigadier General
- Service number: 0-170
- Commands: Division Hospital in Manila; Walter Reed General Hospital; Assistant to the Surgeon General
- Conflicts: Ghost Dance War: Wounded Knee Massacre; Drexel Mission Fight; Philippine–American War; Mexican Revolution; World War I: Western Front
- Awards: Distinguished Service Medal; Medaille d'Honneur

Brigadier General James Denver Glennan (March 2, 1862 – December 24, 1927) was a senior United States Army officer in the Medical Corps. Beginning his career in 1888 on the frontier during the Indian Wars, Glennan served in the military until his death in 1927. By then he held command of various hospitals and posts in Cuba, the Philippines, France, and the continental United States.

== Early life ==
James Denver Glennan was born in Rochester, New York, on March 2, 1862, to Dr. and Mrs. Patrick Glennan. Immigrating to the United States as a child in 1828 from County Meath, Ireland, Patrick's family eventually settled in Rochester. Graduating in medicine from Geneva College in 1850, he returned to his home of Rochester where he married his wife, raised a family, and practiced medicine until the outbreak of the Civil War.

Patrick was first appointed acting assistant surgeon with the Union Army in 1862 and served in this capacity until becoming commissioned as assistant surgeon, United States Volunteers, in May 1864. Mustering out in November 1867, he was the last surgeon of volunteers to have done so. For the majority of his wartime service he was in charge of Stone General Hospital, Washington, D.C.; however, after it closed in 1865, he spent the remainder of his military service at Freedmen's Hospital. He established and then was made executive officer of the hospital in 1868, remaining in this capacity for over twenty-five years.

Freedmen's Hospital later became the university hospital for Howard University. James, along with his two other brothers, followed his father's example and attended the university's medical school. He graduated with his medical degree in 1886 and became appointed assistant surgeon, regular army, on October 29, 1888.

== Military service ==
=== On the frontier ===
Soon after joining the army, Glennan reported for duty at Fort Riley, Kansas, with the 7th Cavalry. He was with the regiment on the Pine Ridge Agency during the winter of 1890, when it took part in the Wounded Knee Massacre and Drexel Mission Fight. His "fortitude and cool performance of duty under trying fire," during the Ghost Dance War, was commended.

His next assignment was at Fort Sill, Oklahoma. Arriving there in 1892, he would remain at the post for the next five years at the same time that Geronimo and other Apache prisoners were housed there. His next door neighbor on the post was Hugh L. Scott, future Chief of Staff of the United States Army. Scott was commander of Troop L, 7th Cavalry, which was an Indian scout unit. Both men established a strong relationship with the Native Americans on the post. At one point an outbreak of measles occurred among the native children. Glennan "labored with them incessantly," with the help of Scott and three other soldiers. The camp was quarantined and losses were small. Grateful, the soldiers of Troop L pooled their money together and presented Glennan with a piece of silver.

Glennan became greatly concerned with the welfare of Apache children at Indian boarding schools. In a letter that he composed on November 1, 1895, he described the bad practices of Carlisle Indian Industrial School in detail. He recalled an experience that he had with one child:

I have seen a boy from Carlisle, dying from phthisis, compelled to travel in a day coach until unconscious, and then twenty-eight miles in a stage in an effort to get [home] before death, which was accomplished by a few hours.

Glennan believed that returning infected children to the healthy dry atmosphere of the American Southwest as early as possible would give the sufferers "a chance for life." This would also prevent outbreaks in the tribes as sufferers became infectious in the later parts of their disease. The letter reached George Miller Sternberg, Surgeon General of the army, later being forwarded to the adjutant general. It is noted that no action was taken as a result of this correspondence.

During a time that organized Native American companies within the army faced staunch criticism by officers, Glennan wrote an article supporting their existence in an 1895 issue of the Journal of the Military Service Institution of the United States. He acknowledged that not all companies had been successful in nature, with a number of them experiencing a variety of failures, yet "it is time for those who have seen good results to speak of them." He used his observations of Scott's Troop L as evidence. The men of the troop, from the Apache, Comanche, and Apache tribes, entered the service three years prior as "the usual blanket Indians," however, military service changed all that. Completion of their military service allowed the soldiers to return to their tribes, where their influence became significant and positive. Having become conversational in English, made aware of the benefits of cooperating with the federal government, disciplined, and exposed to responsibility, Glennan called the incorporation of Native Americans into organized army units the "strongest hold the Government has ever had on these tribes."

=== Promotions ===
List of Glennan's promotions in chronological order:

Insignia	Rank	Component	Date
"No insignia"	Assistant Surgeon	Regular Army	October 29, 1888 (accepted October 31)
	Captain (Assistant Surgeon)	Regular Army	October 29, 1893
	Major (Brigade Surgeon)	Regular Army	June 4, 1898 (accepted June 24); Honorably discharged May 12, 1899)
	Major (Surgeon)	Volunteers	August 17, 1899 (accepted August 20); Vacated May 11, 1901; Reappointed and vacated January 1, 1902
	Major (Surgeon)	Regular Army	January 1, 1902
	Major (Surgeon)	Medical Corps, Regular Army	January 1, 1902
	Lieutenant Colonel	Regular Army	January 1, 1910
	Colonel	Regular Army	July 1, 1916
	Brigadier general	Medical Corps, National Army	October 1, 1918 (accepted October 14); Honorably discharged March 15, 1919 and reverted to the rank of colonel
	Brigadier general	Regular Army	February 9, 1925 (accepted same day)

== Death ==
Although Glennan was retired on March 2, 1926, he was activated two days later in order to supervise construction work being done on Walter Reed and served in this capacity until his death on December 24, 1927. With his funeral held on December 27, a number of close associates and friends served as honorary pall bearers, including Major general Merritte W. Ireland.

== Personal life ==
=== Hobbies ===
Glennan took a keen interest in his surrounding while stationed on the frontier. Outside of his military duties, he took up collecting Native American artifacts as a hobby. Hugh L. Scott recalled that Glennan "was making a collection of Indian curios" and purchased a Kiowa warrior's shield for fifty dollars from him. He amassed an extensive collection during his lifetime. After his death, a large portion of it was donated to the Smithsonian Institution in the 1940s by Frances Glennan. Over seventy artifacts representing the Kiowa, Comanche, Apache, Cheyenne, Blackfoot, Pueblo, along with a number of other Native American cultures, are currently housed at the National Museum of Natural History.

=== Family ===
Glennan never married during his lifetime. Despite remaining single, he was nonetheless considered a "handsome man" with "many attractive qualities."
