= Textbook of Military Medicine =

Collection of Medical Textbooks specialising in military medicine

The Textbook of Military Medicine (TMM) is a series of volumes on military medicine published since 1989 by the Borden Institute, of the Office of The Surgeon General, of the United States Department of the Army. It constitutes a comprehensive, multi-volume treatise on the art and science of military medicine, as practiced by the United States armed forces. The books integrate lessons learned in past wars with current principles and practices of military medical doctrine.

The spectrum of topics is broad, ranging from wound ballistics to medical ethics, and from considerations of harsh environments to applied biomedicine. The TMM series is intended to be tri-service in scope, although the majority of contributors are affiliated with the U.S. Army.

== The titles ==
The 18 volumes of the TMM published thus far are as follows:

- Medical Consequences of Nuclear Warfare (1989) - Addresses the increasingly important medical challenges of the consequences and management of radiation injuries: 287 p.; ill.; Reprinted 1999.
- Conventional Warfare: Ballistic, Blast, and Burn Injuries (1991) - Addresses in detail conventional weapons, their effects, and the treatment of the casualties that they generate. Reviews the historical significance of these injuries, and explains the basic scientific principles underlying the injuring mechanisms so that the medical officer will have an understanding of the injuries they must treat: 396 p.; ill.
- Occupational Health: The Soldier and the Industrial Base (1993) - Describes the occurrence and prevention of occupational threats from the environment and military equipment. Also offers preventive measures that decrease the occupational threat: 643 p.; ill.
- Military Dermatology (1994) - Places military dermatology in its historical context. Emphasizes and illustrates the conditions that specialists and general medical officers in the field are likely to see. Discusses diseases that are uncommon in the United States but prevalent worldwide in specific geographical locations: 617 p.; ill.
- Military Psychiatry: Preparing in Peace for War (1994) - Explores various mental health issues that may occur in the military during peacetime: 331 p.; ill.
- War Psychiatry (1995) - Discusses the evolution of the concept of combat stress reaction, the delivery of mental health care on the various battlefields soldiers are likely to experience, and the psychological consequences of having endured the intensity and lethality of modern combat: 515 p.; ill.
- Anesthesia and Perioperative Care of the Combat Casualty (1995) - Describes and illustrates the entire spectrum of combat casualty care from initial wounding through anesthetic management to critical care in the intensive care unit. Written from the perspective of the military anesthetic provider: 931 p.; ill.
- Medical Aspects of Chemical and Biological Warfare (1997) - With the increasing reality of chemical and biological attacks in war and terrorism, this book is a single-source compendium of the important aspects of chemical and biological agents including descriptions of the agents, and the pathophysiology of the injuries, diagnosis, and management of the injuries: 721 p.; ill.
- Rehabilitation of the Injured Combatant, Vol 1 (1998) - Focuses on the aspects of rehabilitative care that are specifically related to wounds sustained through combat and military training. Covers topics such as spinal cord injury rehabilitation, traumatic brain injury and physical therapy in wartime environment: 478 p.; ill.
- Rehabilitation of the Injured Combatant, Vol 2 (1999) - Offers a valuable reference for physicians and providers who care for those injured while fighting. Discusses topics ranging from peripheral nerve injuries to vocational rehabilitation and community reintegration of the wounded combatant: 556 p; ill.
- Medical Aspects of Harsh Environments, Vol 1 (2002) - Describes and illustrates the medical conditions caused by heat and cold, including topics ranging from heat illness prevention to the treatment of hypothermia. Provides historical background and current information on the physiology, physical derangements, psychology, prevention, and treatment of heat- and cold-related environmental illnesses and injuries. Contains a color atlas of cold injuries and their treatment: 609 p.; ill.
- Medical Aspects of Harsh Environments, Vol 2 (2002) - Discusses medical considerations with respect to mountain environments, high altitudes, and conditions below sea level. Includes researched information and illustrations on human adaptation to these harsh environments and the physical, cognitive, and psychological effects of exposure. Addresses the medical aspects of several special environments: aboard ships at sea, the hyperbaric world of diving, supersonic aviation, spaceflight, and chemical-biological protective suits: 595 p.; ill.
- Ophthalmic Care of the Combat Casualty (2003) - Offers a comprehensive reference for treatment of ocular injuries; contains detailed information about a new trauma scale, ocular anesthesia, laser injuries, geographical ophthalmology, and ocular injuries caused by terrorist blasts. Includes color photos, more than 600 detailed illustrations, and a step-by-step guide for treatment of ocular injuries, including illustrations of the surgical repair of simple and complex eye injuries: 495 p.; ill.
- Military Preventive Medicine: Mobilization and Deployment, Vol 1 (2003) - Explores the various natural and manmade challenges faced by today's soldier upon mobilization and deployment. Offers comprehensive research on a range of topics related to preventive medicine, including a historic perspective on the principles of military preventive medicine, national mobilization and training, preparation for deployment, and occupational and environmental issues during sustainment: 704 p.; ill.
- Military Medical Ethics Vol. 1 (2003) and Military Medical Ethics Vol. 2 (2003) - Explores the ongoing tension between the medical profession and the profession of arms as experienced by the military physician, including an extensive and detailed discussion of the many lessons learned from previous wars. Topics range from discussions of traditional medical ethics, military ethics, and the unique field of military medical ethics, to a discussion of medicine gone awry, as exemplified by the Nazi doctors, the Japanese biomedical experimentation programs during the WWII era, and the radiation experiments conducted in the United States. Some authors are uniformed officers; some are civilian academics. Many support military medicine; a few do not. Although written for uniformed medical officers, this book is also relevant for a wider audience; 868 p.; ill.
- Military Preventive Medicine: Mobilization and Deployment, Vol 2 (2005) - Offers comprehensive research on a range of topics related to preventive medicine, including the exploration of epidemiology in the field, various infectious diseases, preventive medicine efforts following disasters and the effects of post-deployment on soldiers: 735 p.; ill.
- Recruit Medicine (2006) - Aimed at all those involved in providing care and determining policy for military recruits, this volume covers important aspects of recruit medicine, such as the medical qualifications process; health promotion and environmental risk management; chronic diseases such as asthma; injury prevention and management; communicable illnesses; behavioral, dental, and women's health; and recruit mortality. Recruit medicine combines aspects of epidemiology, preventive medicine, primary care, orthopedics, gynecology, psychiatry, and dentistry: 581 p.; ill.
- Medical Aspects of Biological Warfare (2007) - An updating and expansion of the biodefense portion of Medical Aspects of Chemical and Biological Warfare (1997).
- Medical Aspects of Chemical Warfare (2008) - An updating and expansion of the chemical defense portion of Medical Aspects of Chemical and Biological Warfare (1997).

In addition, the following volumes are in preparation:

- Healthcare of Women in the Military
- Care of the Combat Amputee
- Combat and Operational Behavioral Health

Volumes of the TMM are distributed free of charge to military medical personnel. The Borden Institute also offers user-friendly, deployable versions of the TMM series on CD-ROM.
