= Borden Institute =

- Focus: Military Medical Research and Education
- Key people: Army Colonel Russ Zajtchuk; Dr. Don Jenkins; Colonel Ron Bellamy

The Borden Institute is a U.S. Army “Center of Excellence in Military Medical Research and Education”.

In 1987, U.S. Army Colonel Russ Zajtchuk conceived the idea for a “Center of Excellence in Military Medical Research and Education,” under the Army's Office of The Surgeon General (OTSG). The center was soon made a reality, largely through the efforts of Zajtchuk, Dr. Don Jenkins, and Colonel Ron Bellamy. In 1992, to honor Lieutenant Colonel William Cline Borden (Major Walter Reed’s personal physician and conceiver of the original Walter Reed General Hospital) the center’s name was changed to Borden Institute. The institute was located at Delano Hall on the campus of Walter Reed Army Medical Center (WRAMC), in Washington, D.C. After WRAMC's closure, the institute moved to Fort Sam Houston.

To date, the Borden Institute has published nearly 20 volumes of the Textbook of Military Medicine (TMM) series. These comprehensive reference books on the art and science of military medicine are extensively illustrated and written in an easy-to-follow narrative. The TMM series is designed to illustrate how military medicine has built on the lessons learned in past wars, and to lay out the scientific basis on which the practice of military medicine is grounded. On June 3, 2019, Borden Institute released “Military Veterinary Services” as a part of the Textbooks of Military Medicine series.

== See also ==
- War Surgery in Afghanistan and Iraq
