= William Cline Borden =

American military surgeon

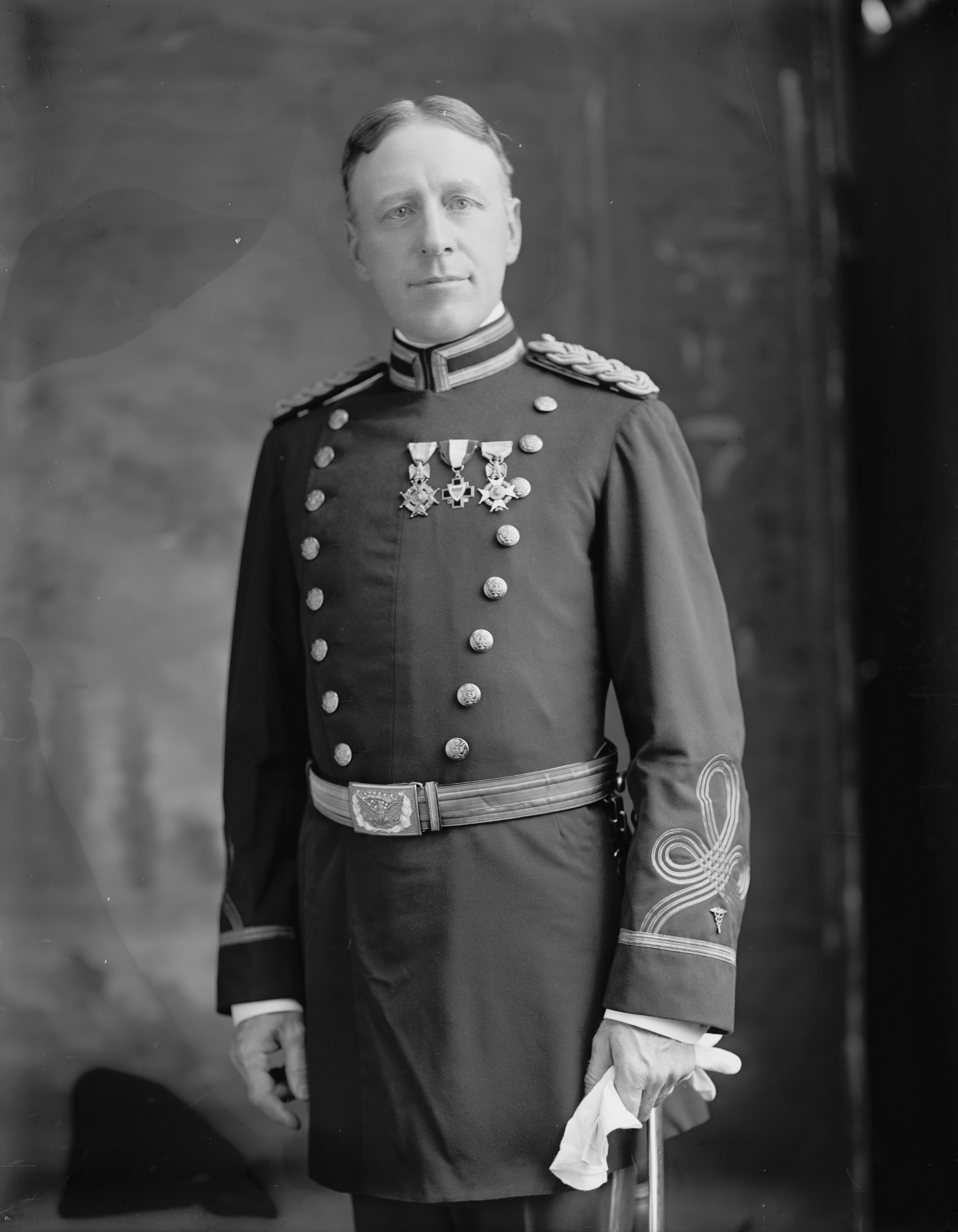
- Born: May 9, 1858; Watertown, New York, US
- Died: August 18, 1934 (aged 76); Chaumont, New York, US
- Education: George Washington University
- Military career
- Branch: United States Army
- Rank: Lieutenant Colonel

William Cline Borden (May 9, 1858 – August 18, 1934) was an American surgeon who was a key planner behind the Walter Reed Army Medical Center. Borden was also dean of the School of Medicine at George Washington University.

According to the medical center website, Borden "was the initiator, planner and effective mover for the creation, location, and first congressional support of the medical center." For this reason, it is still referred to today as "Borden's dream."

== Biography ==
William Cline Borden was born on May 19, 1858, in Watertown, New York, to parents Daniel J. Borden and Mary Louisa Cline. He attended schools in Watertown and the Adams Collegiate Institute in Adams, New York. Borden graduated from George Washington University with an M.D. and was commissioned into the United States Army as a lieutenant and assistant surgeon in 1883. He married Jennie E. Adams on October 23, 1883. Five years later he was promoted to the rank of captain. During the Spanish–American War he was promoted to major and commanded a Division Hospital in Key West.

Borden published the papers "An Extemporized Section Flattener" (1887) and "The Origin and Development of the Fat Cell of the Frog" (1899). In 1898 Borden, at the time a major, became commandant and operating surgeon of the U.S. Army General Hospital Washington Barracks. In autumn 1901 he was made an instructor at the Army Medical School. He was interested in bacteriology and histology, published an article on "Practical Photomicrography by Use of the Oil Lamp" and experimented with early X-ray machines, writing the first textbook about X-rays in America in 1899. Borden was promoted to the rank of major brigade surgeon in 1898; he would reach major surgeon in 1908. In 1901 Borden lectured at the Columbian Medical College of George Washington University. Borden was also an early advocate of McBurney muscle-splitting.

=== Walter Reed and later life ===
By 1902, Borden was convinced that Washington needed a new, bigger, hospital. The one he had operated since 1898 was overcrowded and in poor condition. He also considered medical instruction facilities "poor". When Borden's friend Walter Reed died in Borden's care in 1902, Borden began to advocate heavily for the establishment of an army general hospital named after Reed. He envisioned that this center would be a combination of the Army Medical School, Army Medical Museum, the library of the Surgeon General of the United States and additional medical facilities. When Congress finally appropriated funds for it in 1905, it was described as "primarily as a result" of his work. The hospital eventually became the Walter Reed Army Medical Center. In the years immediately after 1905, Borden was "-probably the best informed medical officer on the subject of hospital construction."

As he watched the center's construction, Borden hoped to become commanding officer. However, Borden was overdue for a transfer from his position in Washington—at the time, the Army had assigned him to a different detail every four years—and other army officers feared that his familiarity with Congress made him a strong contender to become Surgeon General. In April 1907, a year before Walter Reed opened, Borden was transferred to run a hospital in the Philippines. In 1995, The Washington Post wrote that he would have been the center's "ideal first commander". Described as "disheartened", Borden retired after having a coronary attack at the rank of lieutenant colonel in 1909.

In May 1909 Borden was named dean of the School of Medicine and surgeon in chief of the hospital at George Washington University. He was awarded an honorary doctor of science degree from that institution in 1931, the same year that he retired. During World War I, Borden returned to the army, where he worked as the chief of surgical service at Walter Reed Army Medical Center from 1917 to 1919.

Borden was also a member of the American College of Surgeons, which he helped found, and several other organisations. Borden was considered "one of the better known military surgeons of his time". He died on August 18, 1934, at his home in Chaumont, New York.

== Legacy ==
In 1992, the Center of Excellence in Military Medical Research and Education was renamed the Borden Institute in his honor. In 1995, a building at Walter Reed was named after him.

== Bibliography ==
- Standlee, Mary W. (2009). Borden's Dream: A 1952 Account of How Ltc William Borden's Vision of Walter Reed Army Medical Center Became Reality. U.S. Government Printing Office. ISBN 978-0-9818228-4-6.
