= Walter Reed Army Medical Center =

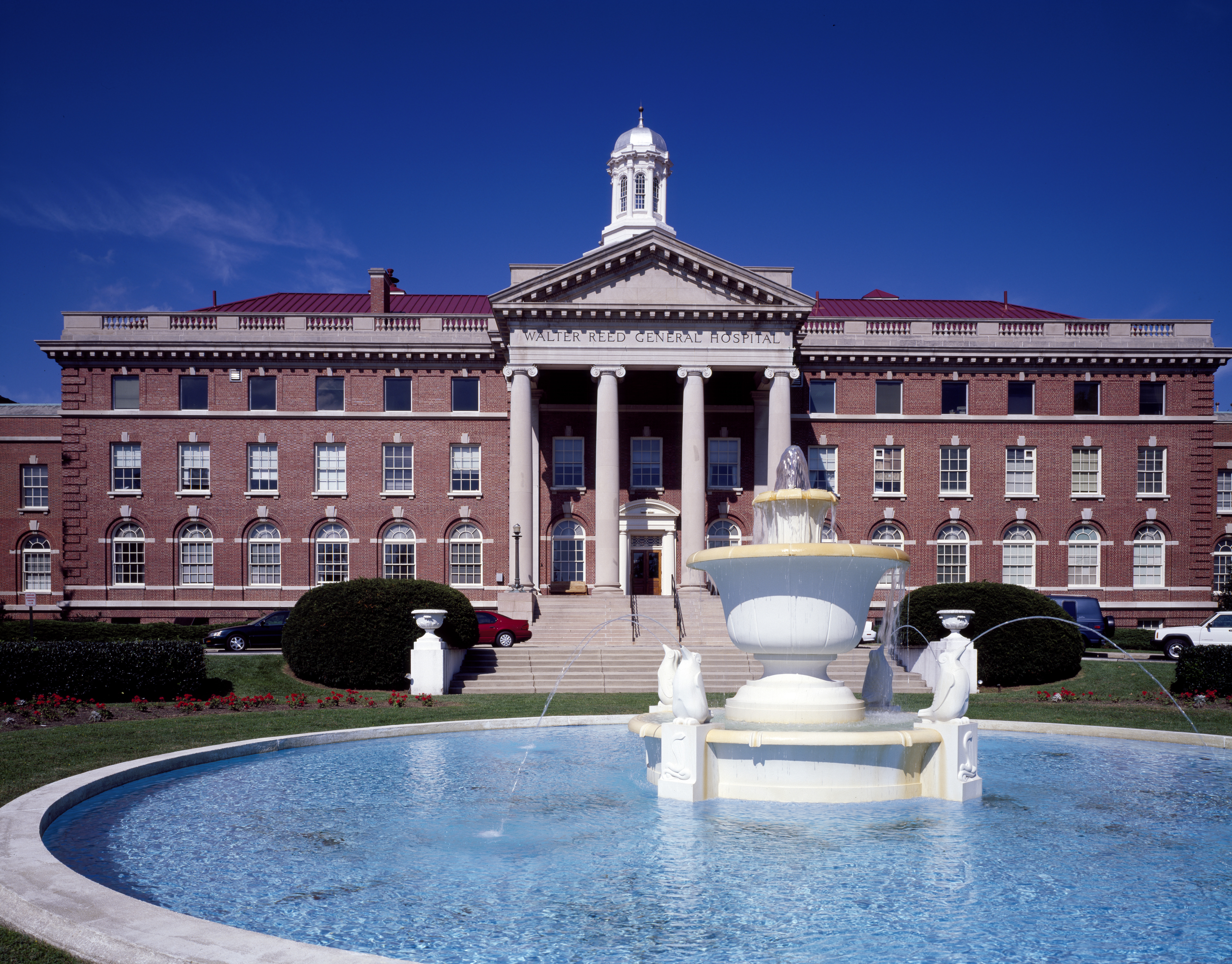
- Walter Reed Medical Center's Building 1 prior to its 2011 closing
- Founded: 1 May 1909
- Disbanded: 27 August 2011
- Country: United States
- Branch: United States Army
- Type: Hospital
- Role: Militarized healthcare
- Motto: "We Provide Warrior Care"
- Decorations: Superior Unit Award

Commanders
- Notable commanders: LTG Kevin C. Kiley (2002 – June 2004; 1–2 March 2007); MG Kenneth L. Farmer Jr. (June 2004 – 25 Aug. 2006); MG. George W. Weightman (25 Aug. 2006 – 1 March 2007); MG Carla Hawley-Bowland (final commander)

Walter Reed Army Medical Center
- Walter Reed Health Care System
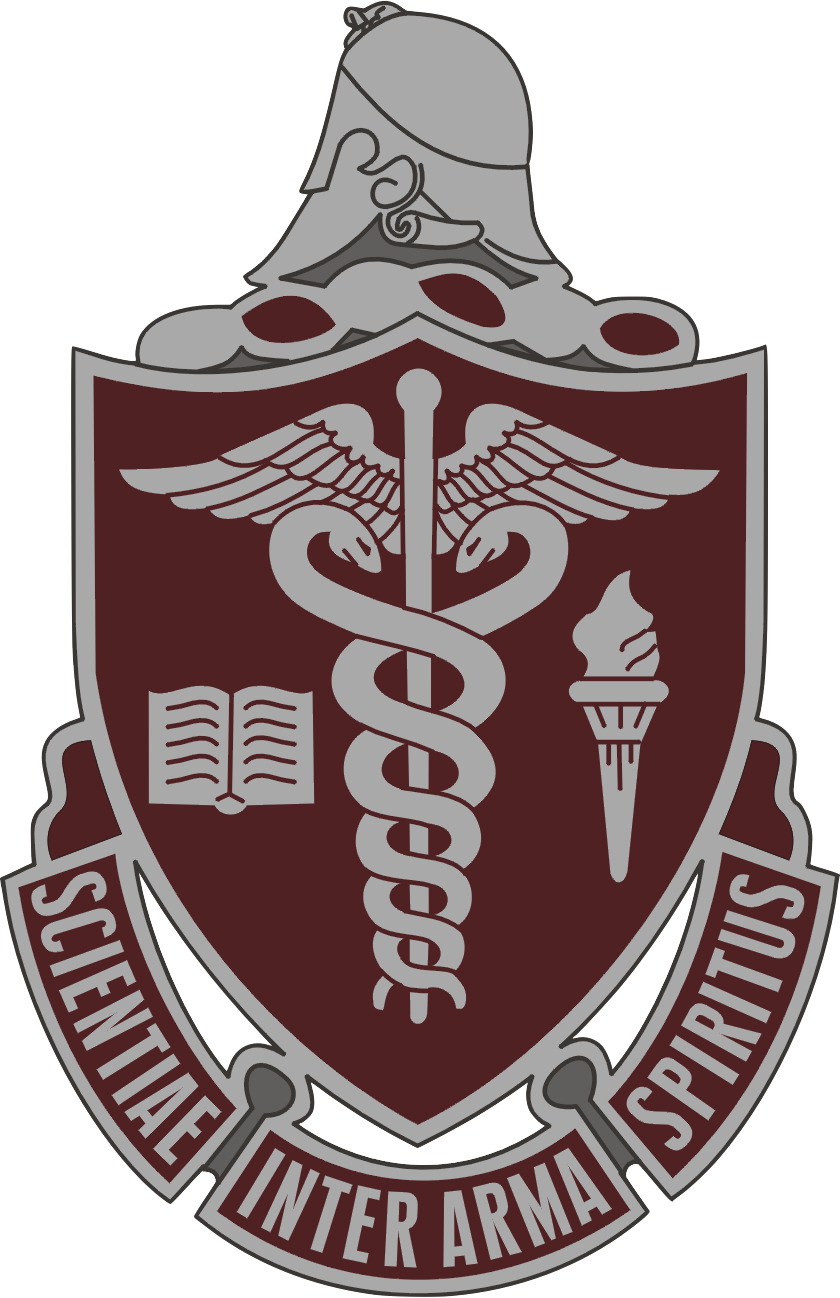
- The WRAMC distinctive unit insignia

Geography
- Location: 8901 Rockville Pike Bethesda, MD 20889, Bethesda, Maryland, United States
- Coordinates: 38°58′30″N 77°01′48″W

Organization
- Care system: Military
- Type: General

History
- Founded: 1 May 1909

Links
- Website: Walter Reed National Military Center
- Lists: Hospitals in the United States
- Walter Reed Army Medical Center (WRAMC) Historic District
- U.S. National Register of Historic Places
- NRHP reference No.: 15000061
- Added to NRHP: 9 March 2015

The Walter Reed Army Medical Center (WRAMC), officially known as Walter Reed General Hospital (WRGH) until 1951, was the U.S. Army's flagship medical center from 1909 to 2011. Located on 113 acres (46 ha) in Washington, D.C., it served more than 150,000 active and retired personnel from all branches of the United States Armed Forces. The center was named after Walter Reed, a U.S. Army physician and Major who led the team that confirmed that yellow fever is transmitted by mosquitoes rather than direct physical contact.

Since its origins, medical care at the facility grew from a bed capacity of 80 patients to approximately 5,500 rooms covering more than 28 acres (11 ha) of floor space. WRAMC combined with the National Naval Medical Center at Bethesda, Maryland, in 2011 to form the tri-service Walter Reed National Military Medical Center (WRNMMC). The grounds and historic buildings of the old campus are being redeveloped as The Parks at Walter Reed.

== History ==
=== Origins at Fort McNair ===
Fort Lesley J. McNair, located in the southwest of the District of Columbia on land set aside by George Washington as a military reservation, is the third oldest U.S. Army installation in continuous use in the United States after West Point and Carlisle Barracks. Its position at the confluence of the Anacostia River and the Potomac River made it an excellent site for the defense of the nation's capital. Dating back to 1791, the post served as an arsenal, played an important role in the nation's defense, and housed the first U.S. Federal Penitentiary from 1839 to 1862.

Today, Fort McNair is the intellectual headquarters for defense. Furthermore, with vistas of the waterfront and the opposing Virginia shoreline, the health clinic at Fort McNair, the precursor of today's Walter Reed Army Medical Center (WRAMC), overlooks the residences of officials who choose the facility for the delivery of their health care needs.

"Walter Reed's Clinic," the location of the present day health clinic at Washington, D.C., occupies what was from 1898 until 1909 the General Hospital at what was then Washington Barracks, long before the post was renamed in honor of Lt. Gen. McNair who was killed in 1944. The hospital served as the forerunner of Walter Reed General Hospital; however, the Victorian era waterfront dispensary remains and is perhaps one of America's most historically significant military medical treatment facilities. It is reported that Walter Reed lived and worked in the facility when he was assigned as Camp Surgeon from 1881 to 1882. After having served on other assignments, he returned as Professor of Medicine and Curator of the Army Medical Museum. Some of his epidemiological work included studies at Washington Barracks, and he is best known for discovering the transmission of yellow fever. In 1902, Major Reed underwent emergency surgery here for appendicitis and died of complications in this U.S. Army Medical Treatment Facility (MTF), within the very walls of what became his final military duty assignment.

Regarding the structure itself, since the 1890s the health clinic was used as an Army General Hospital where physicians, corpsmen and nurses were trained in military health care. In 1899, the morgue was constructed which now houses the Dental Clinic, and in 1901 the hospital became an entirely separate command. This new organizational command relocated eight years later with the aide of horse-drawn wagons and an experimental steam driven ambulance in 1909. Departing from the 50-bed hospital, as documented in The Army Nursing Newsletter, Volume 99, Issue 2, February 2000, they set out due north transporting with them 11 patients initially to the new 65-bed facility in the northern aspect of the capital. Having departed Ft. McNair, the organization has since developed into the Walter Reed Army Medical Center that we know today.

As for the facility they left behind at Fort McNair, it functioned in a smaller role as a post hospital until 1911 when the west wing was converted into a clinic.

=== Walter Reed General Hospital and WRAMC ===
Congressional legislation appropriated $192,000 for the construction of Walter Reed General Hospital (WRGH, now known as "Building 1"). The firm of Marah & Peter did the architectural designs, and Cramp & Company was awarded the construction contract. was the Construction began in 1907. The first ten patients were admitted on 1 May 1909. Lieutenant Colonel William Cline Borden was the initiator, planner and effective mover for the creation, location, and first Congressional support of the Medical Center. Due to his efforts, the facility was nicknamed "Borden's Dream."

In 1923, General John J. Pershing signed the War Department order creating the "Army Medical Center" (AMC) within the same campus as the WRGH. (At this time, the Army Medical School was relocated from 604 Louisiana Avenue and became the "Medical Department Professional Service School" (MDPSS) in the new Building 40.) Pershing lived at Walter Reed from 1944 until his death there 15 July 1948.

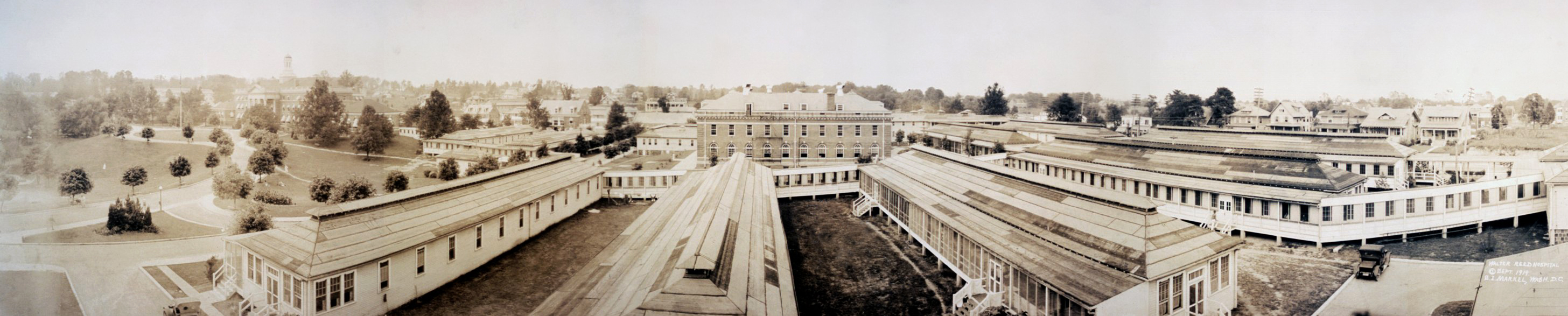
The Walter Reed General Hospital (main building with cupola in distance at far left) in September, 1919. The WRGH was the precursor to WRAMC.

In September 1951, "General Order Number 8" combined the WRGH with the AMC, and the entire complex of 100 rose-brick Georgian Revival style buildings was at that time renamed the "Walter Reed Army Medical Center" (WRAMC). In June 1955, the Armed Forces Institute of Pathology (AFIP) occupied the new Building 54 and, in November, what had been MDPSS was renamed the Walter Reed Army Institute of Research (WRAIR). 1964 saw the birth of the Walter Reed Army Institute of Nursing (WRAIN). Former President Dwight D. Eisenhower died at WRAMC on 28 March 1969.

Starting in 1972, a huge new WRAMC building (Building 2) was constructed and made ready for occupation by 1977. WRAIR moved from Building 40 to a large new facility on the WRAMC Forest Glen Annex in Maryland in 1999. Subsequently, Building 40 was slated for renovation under an enhanced use lease by a private developer.

In 2007, the University of Pennsylvania and WRAMC established a partnership whereby proton therapy technology would be available to treat United States military personnel and veterans in the Perelman Center for Advanced Medicine's new Roberts Proton Therapy Center.

=== 2007 neglect scandal ===
In February 2007, The Washington Post published a series of investigative articles outlining cases of alleged neglect (physical deterioration of housing quarters outside hospital grounds, bureaucratic nightmares, etc.) at WRAMC as reported by outpatient soldiers and their families. A scandal and media furor quickly developed resulting in the firing of the WRAMC commanding general Maj. Gen. George W. Weightman, the resignation of Secretary of the Army Francis J. Harvey (reportedly at the request of Secretary of Defense Robert Gates), the forced resignation of Lt. Gen. Kevin C. Kiley, hospital commander from 2002 to 2004. Congressional committee hearings were called and numerous politicians weighed in on the matter including President George W. Bush, who had appointed Harvey, and Vice-president Dick Cheney. Several independent governmental investigations are ongoing and the controversy has spread to other military health facilities and the Department of Veterans Affairs health care system.

=== 2005 BRAC recommendation and 2011 closure ===
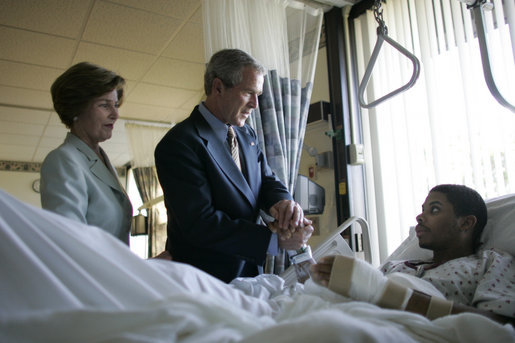
President George W. Bush and First Lady Laura Bush visit Sgt. Patrick Hagood of Anderson, South Carolina on October 5, 2005.

As part of a Base Realignment and Closure announcement on 13 May 2005, the Department of Defense proposed replacing Walter Reed Army Medical Center with a new Walter Reed National Military Medical Center (WRNMMC); the new center would be on the grounds of the National Naval Medical Center in Bethesda, Maryland, seven miles (11 km) from WRAMC's location in Washington, D.C. The proposal was part of a program to transform medical facilities into joint facilities, with staff including Army, Navy, and Air Force medical personnel.

On 25 August 2005, the BRAC Committee recommended passage of the plans for the WRNMMC. The transfer of services from the existing to the new facilities was gradual to allow for continuity of care for the thousands of service members, retirees and family members that depended upon WRAMC. The end of operations at the WRAMC facility occurred on 27 August 2011. The Army says the cost of closing that hospital and consolidating it with Bethesda Naval Medical Center in suburban Maryland more than doubled to $2.6 billion since the plan was announced in 2005 by the Base Realignment and Closing Commission.

== Gallery ==
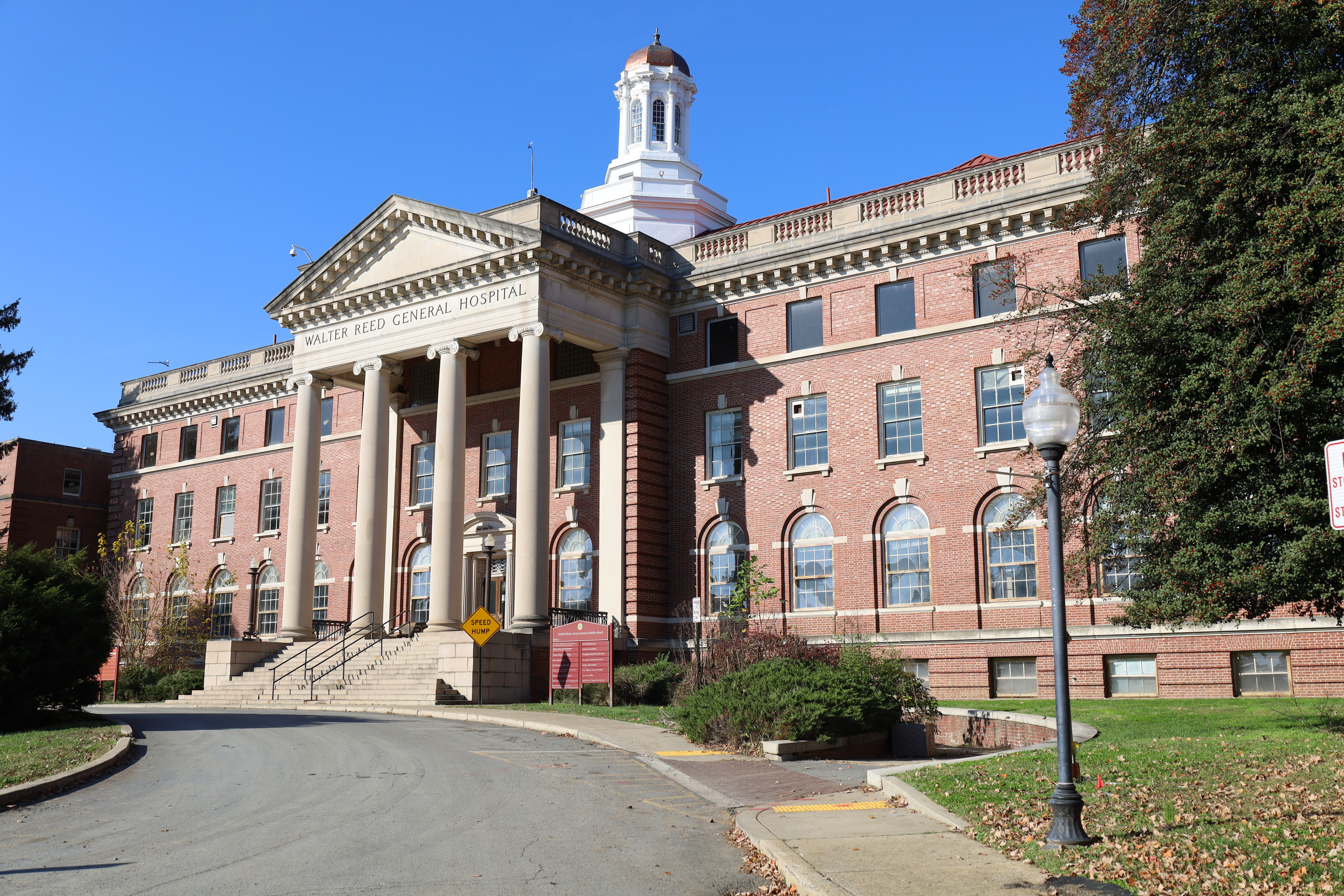
Main Building

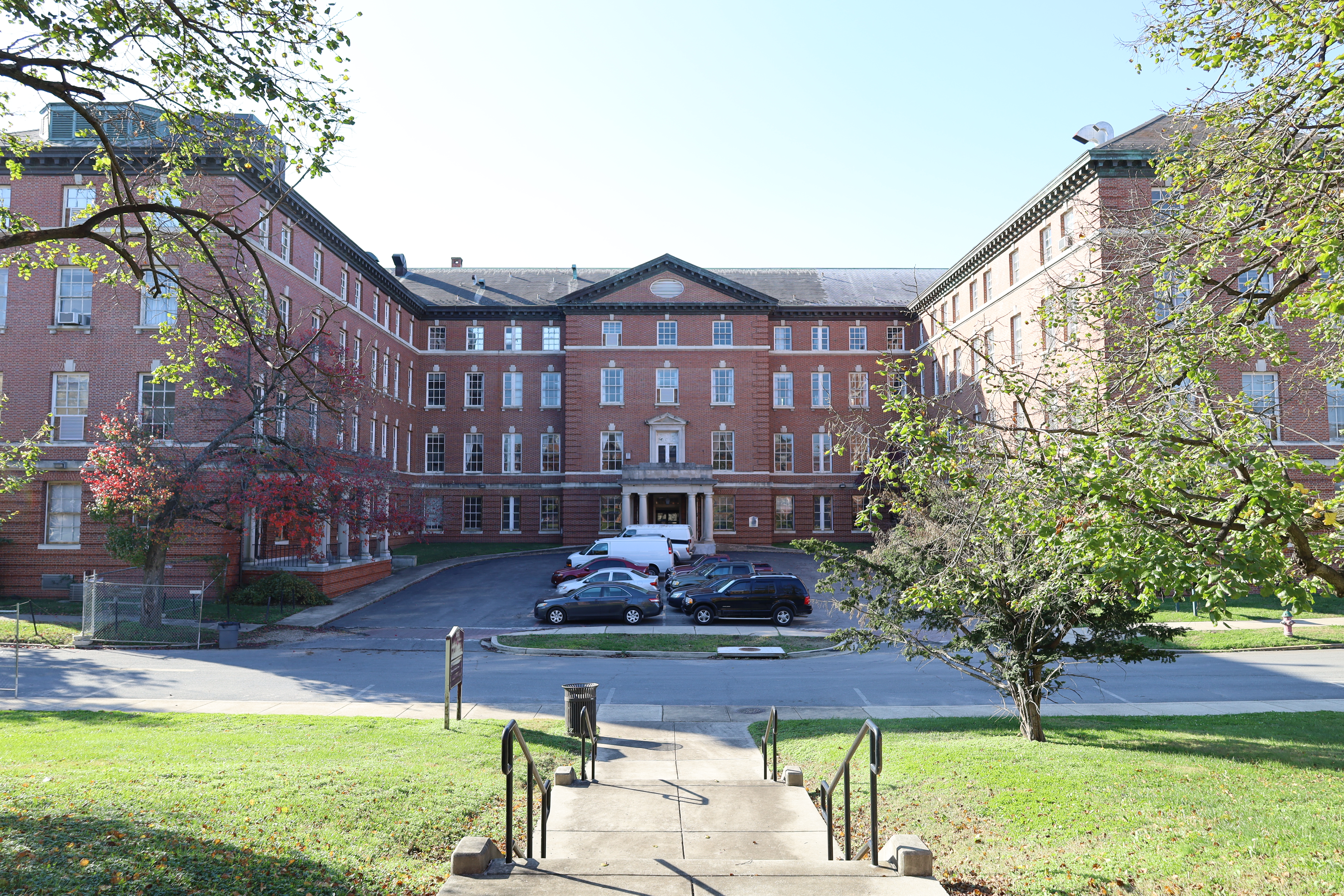
East wing of Main Building

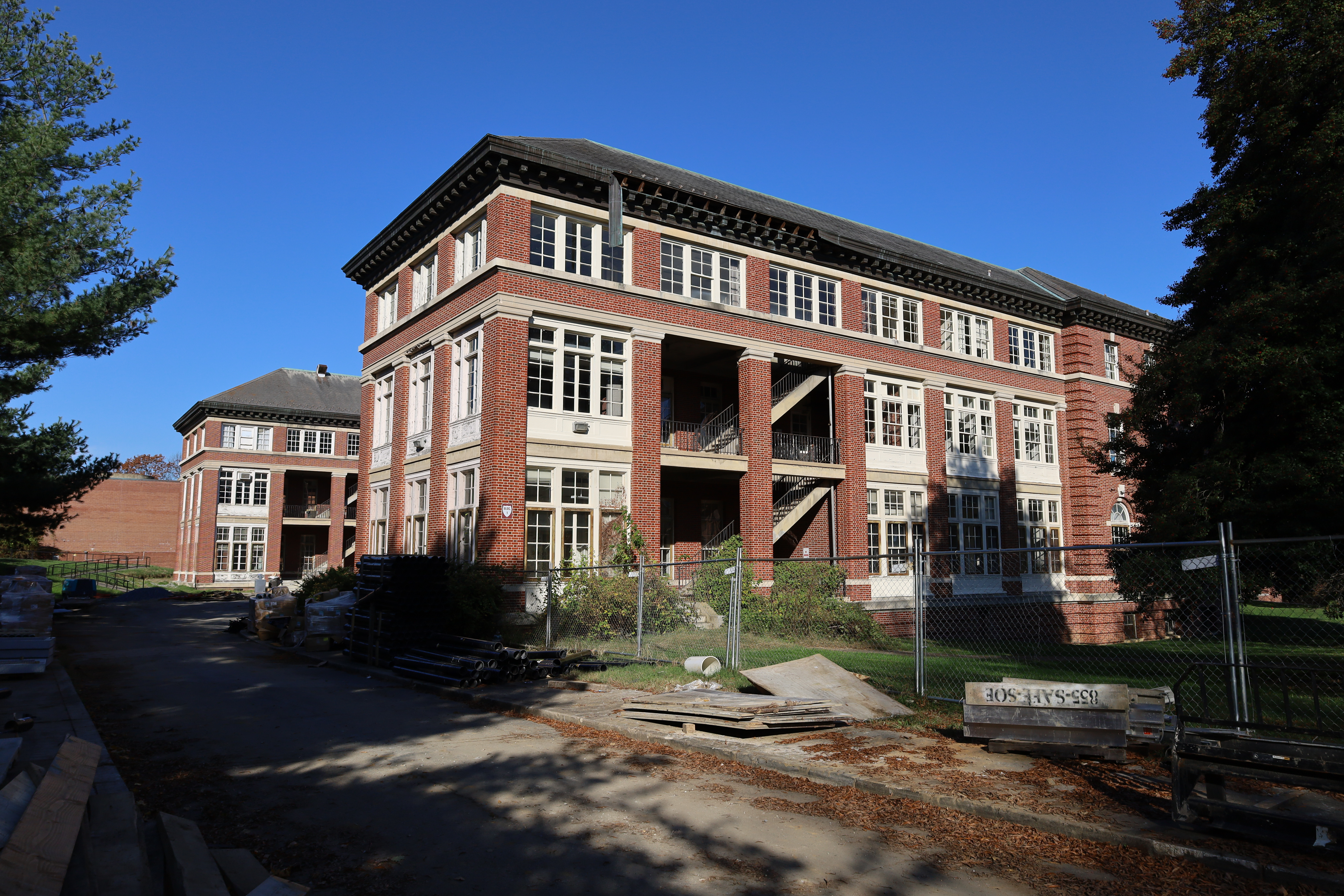
West wing of Main Building

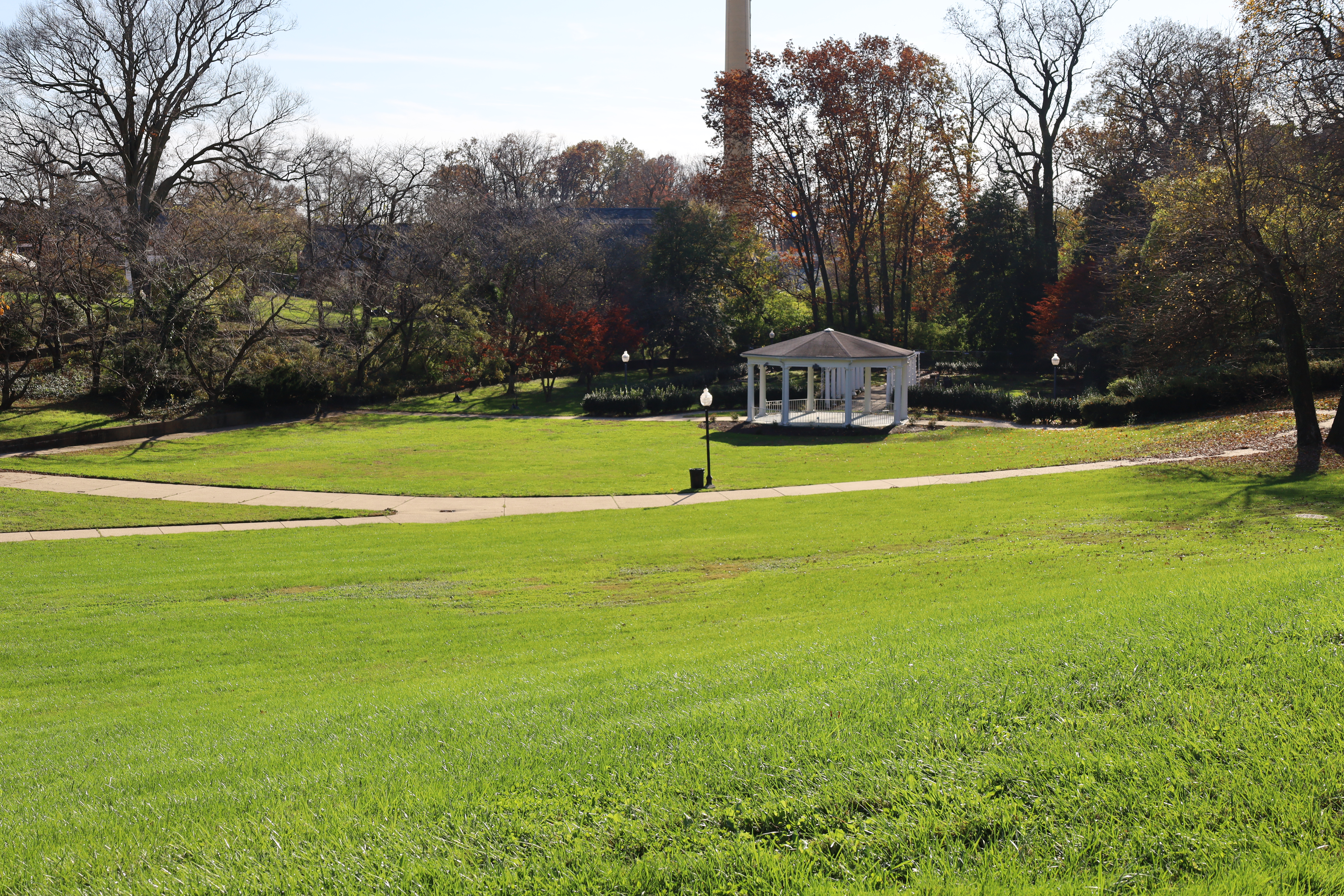
Great Lawn

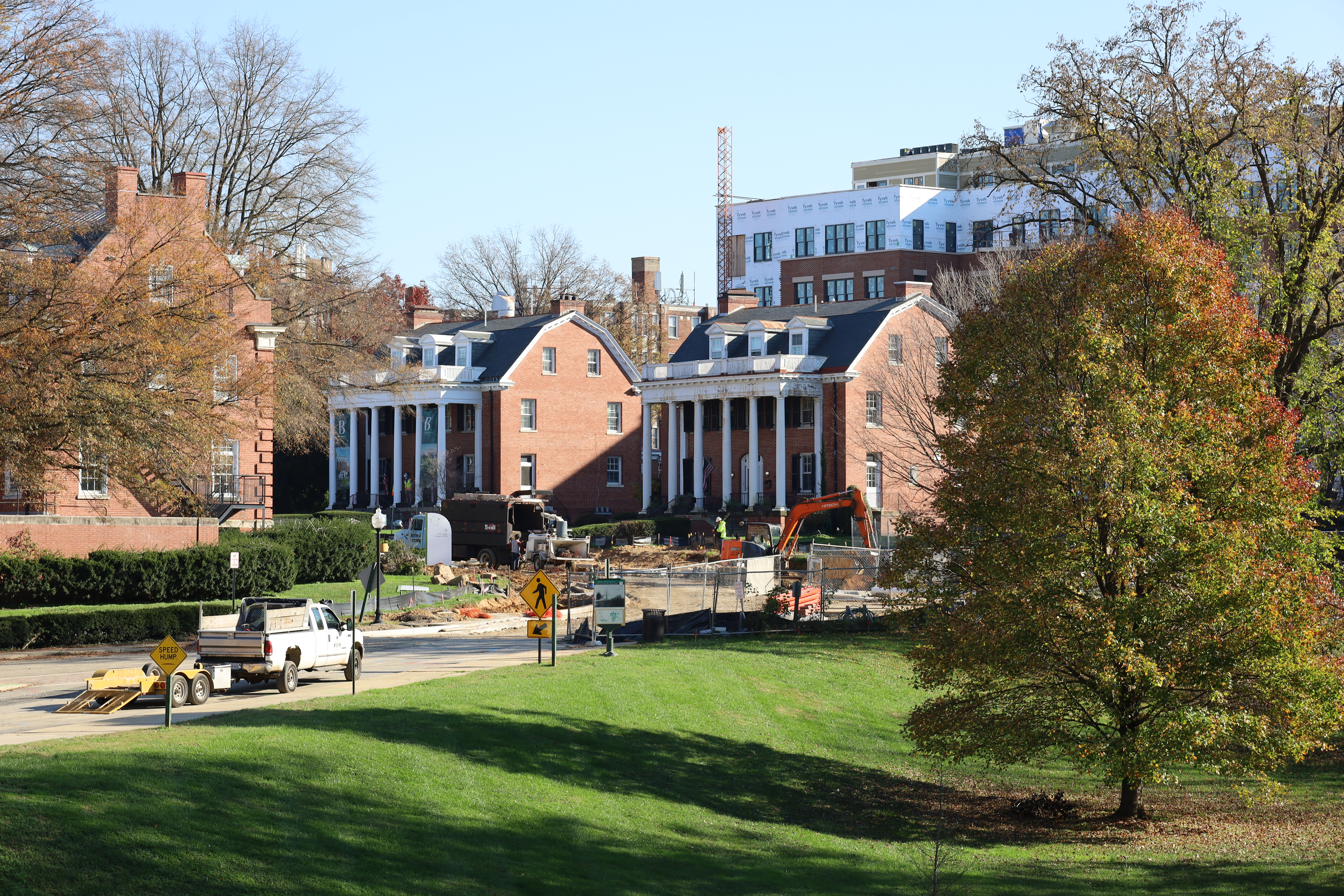
Buildings 8 and 9

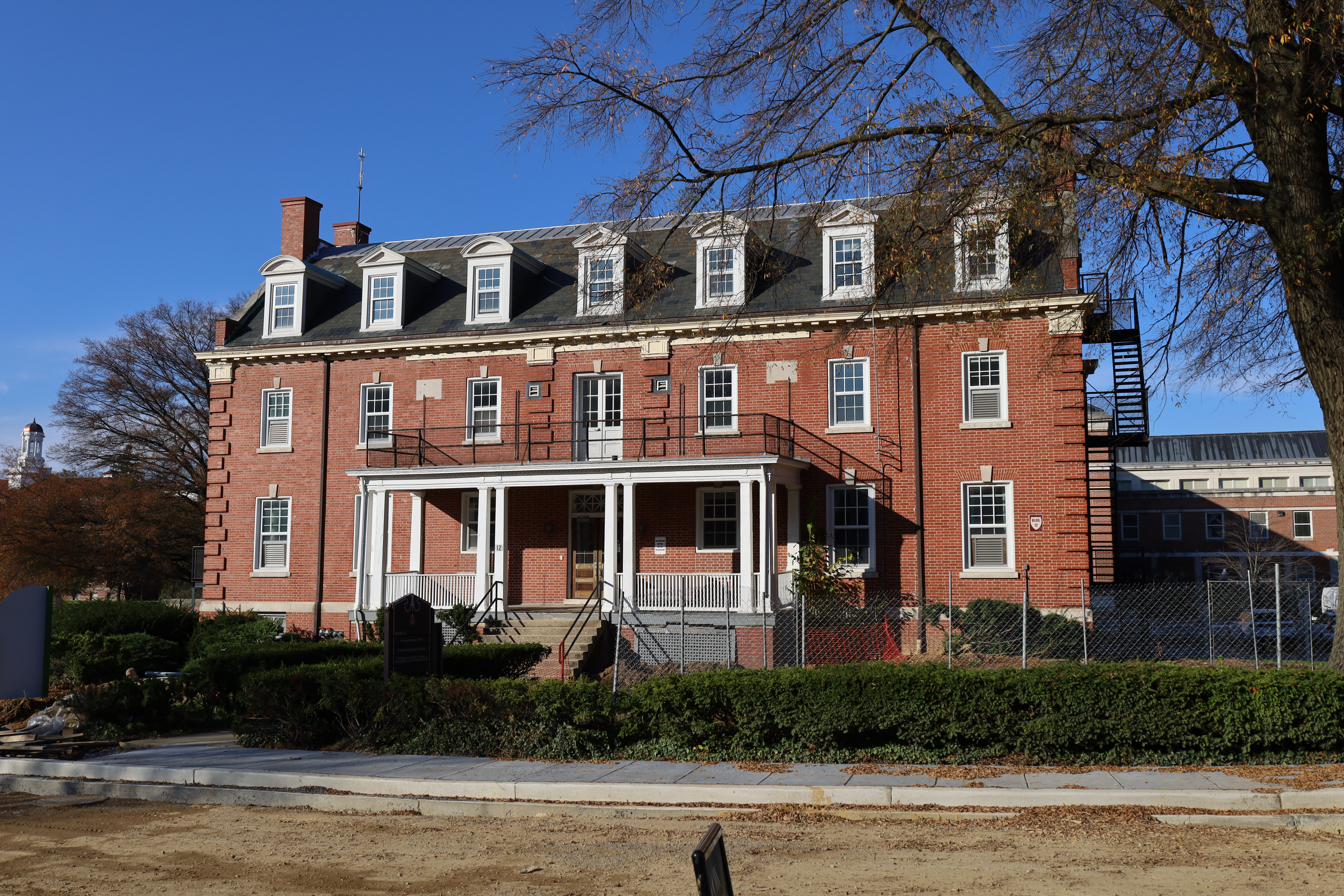
Building 12

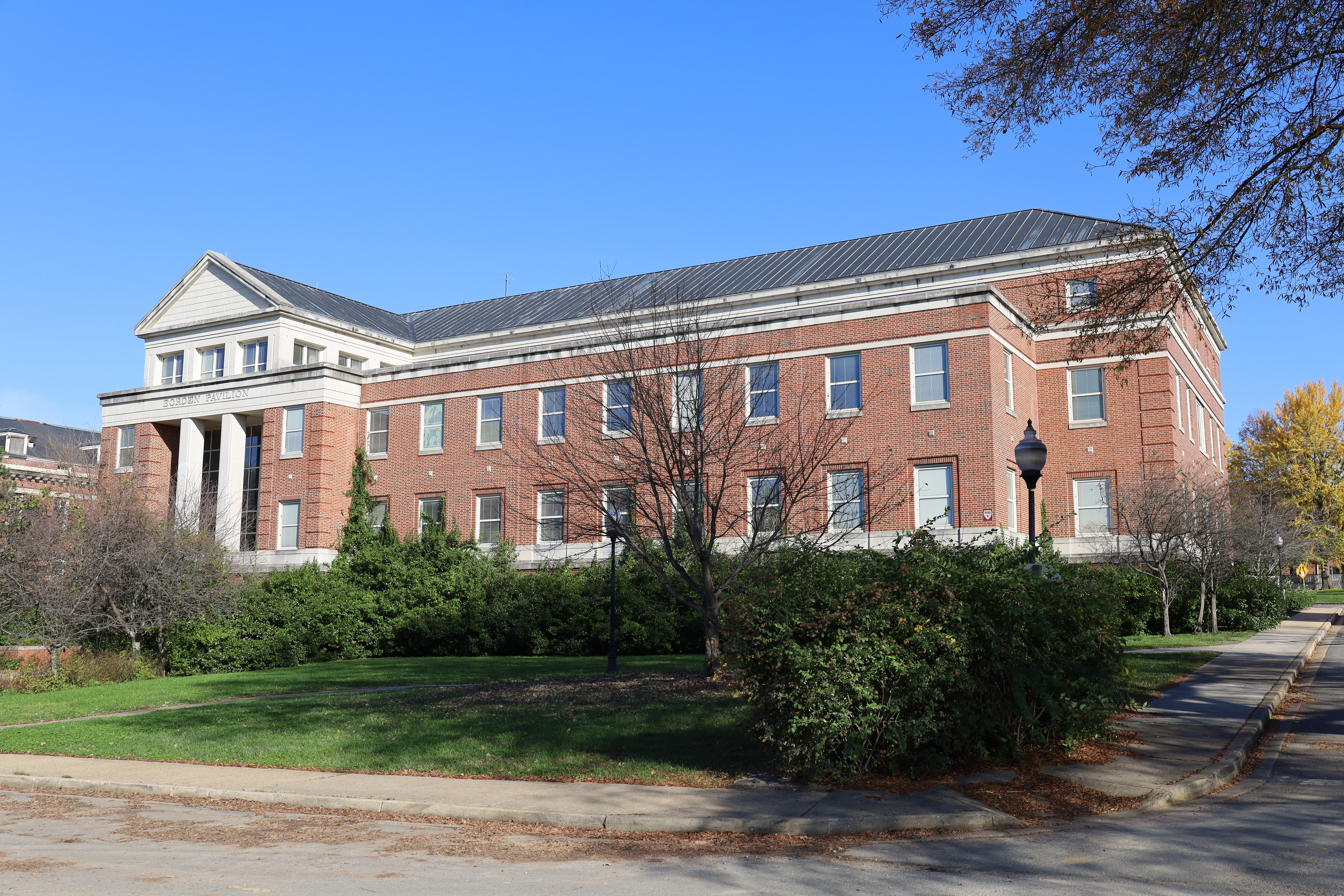
Borden Pavilion

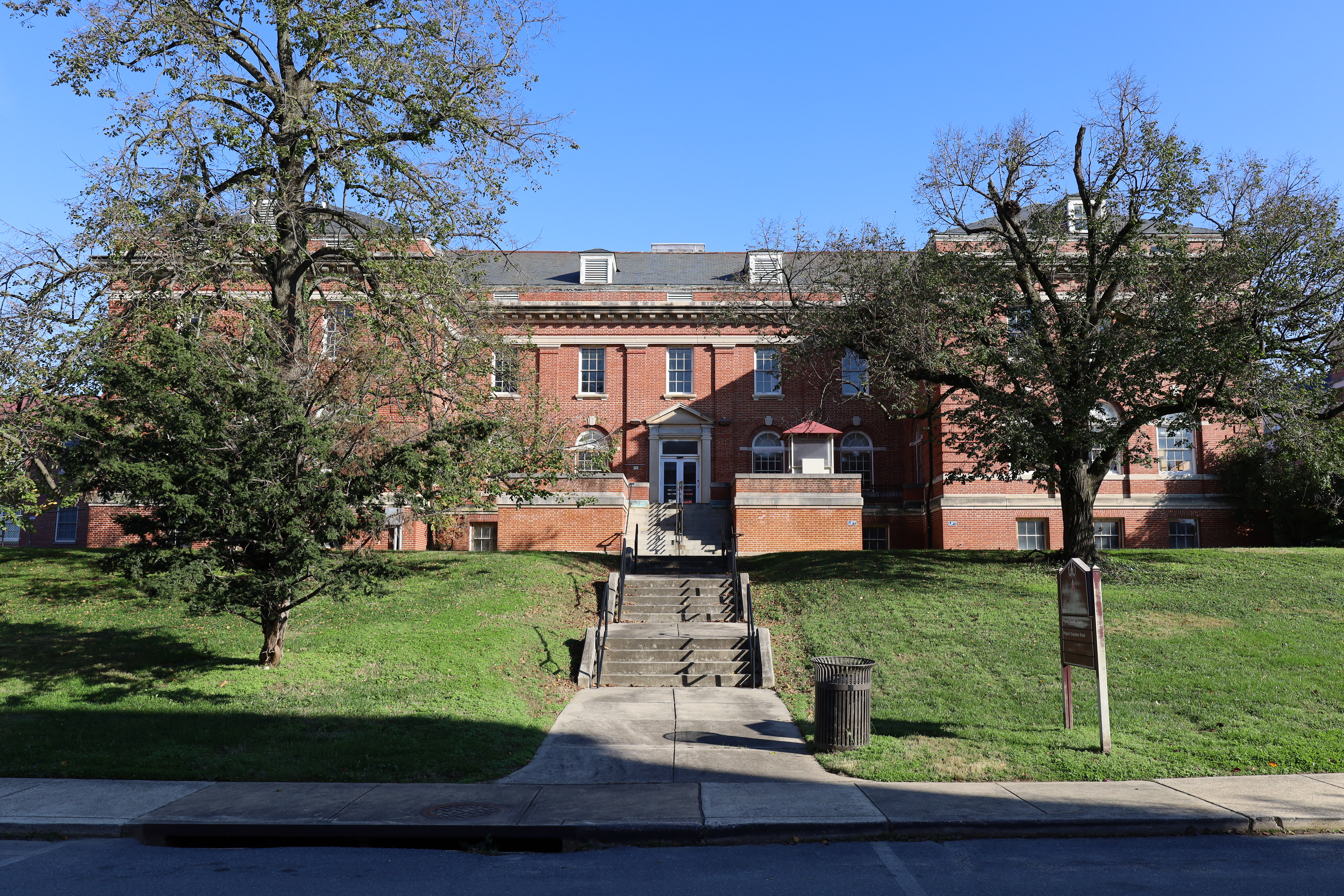
Building 7

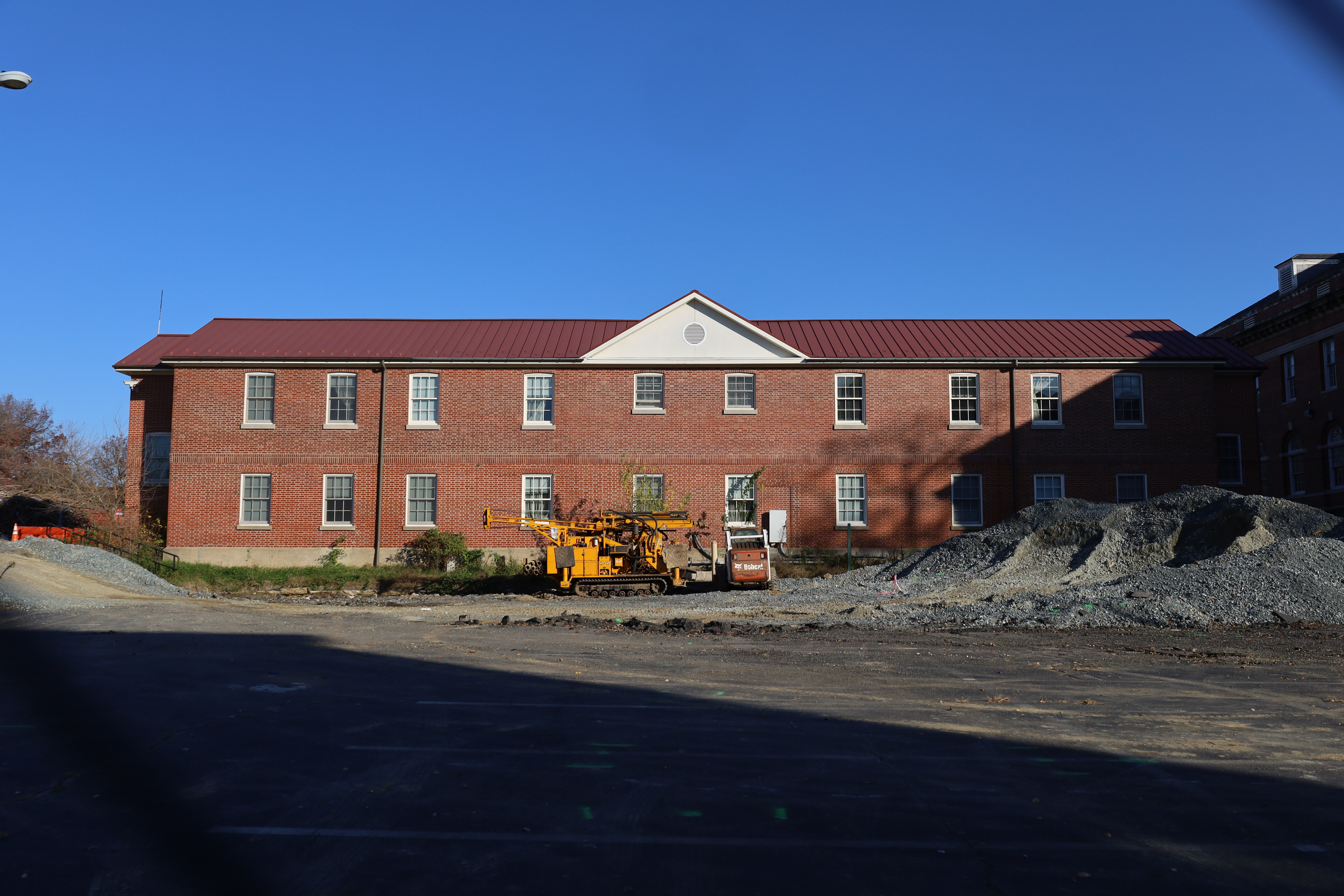
Vaccaro Hall

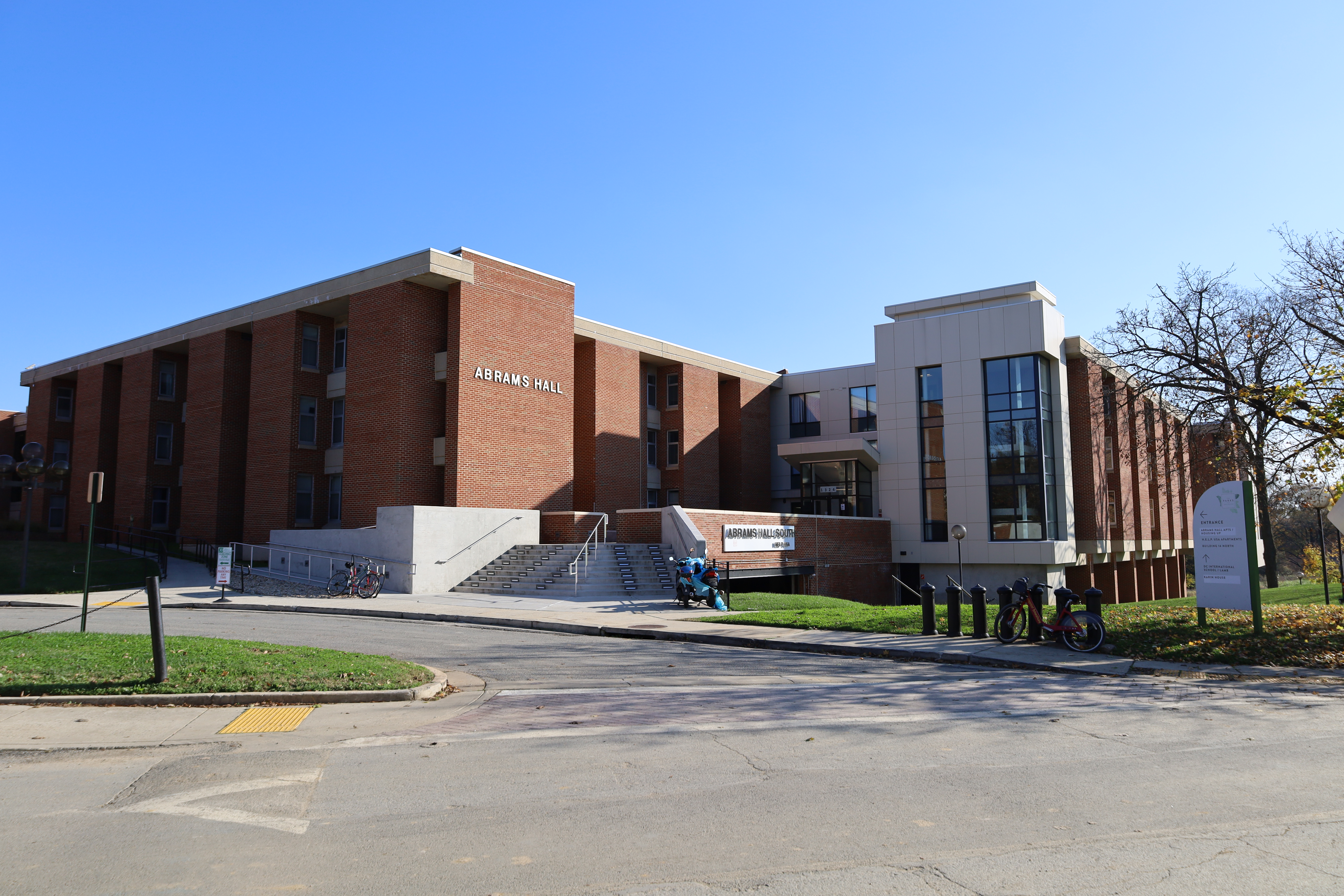
Abrams Hall

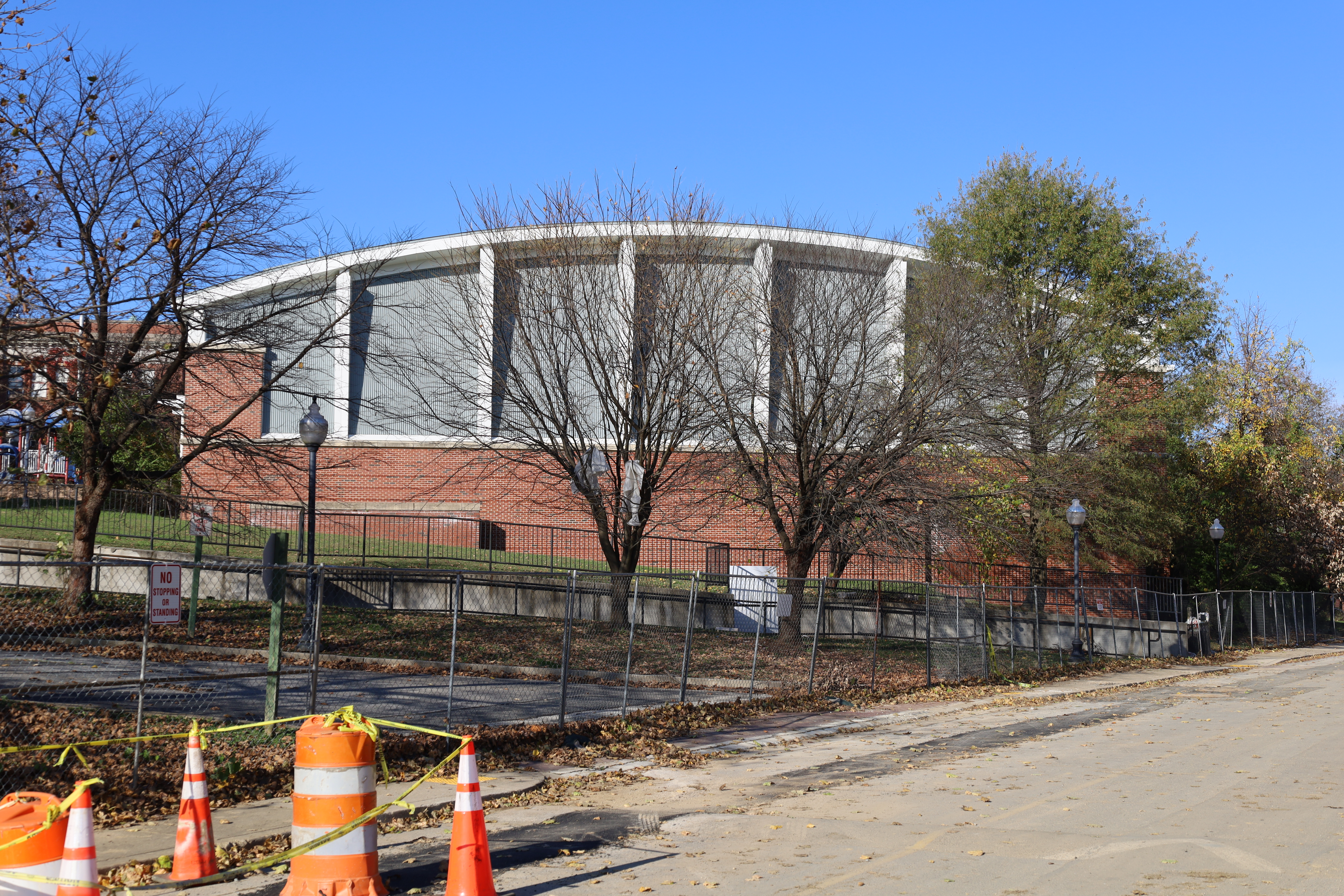
Wagner Sports Center

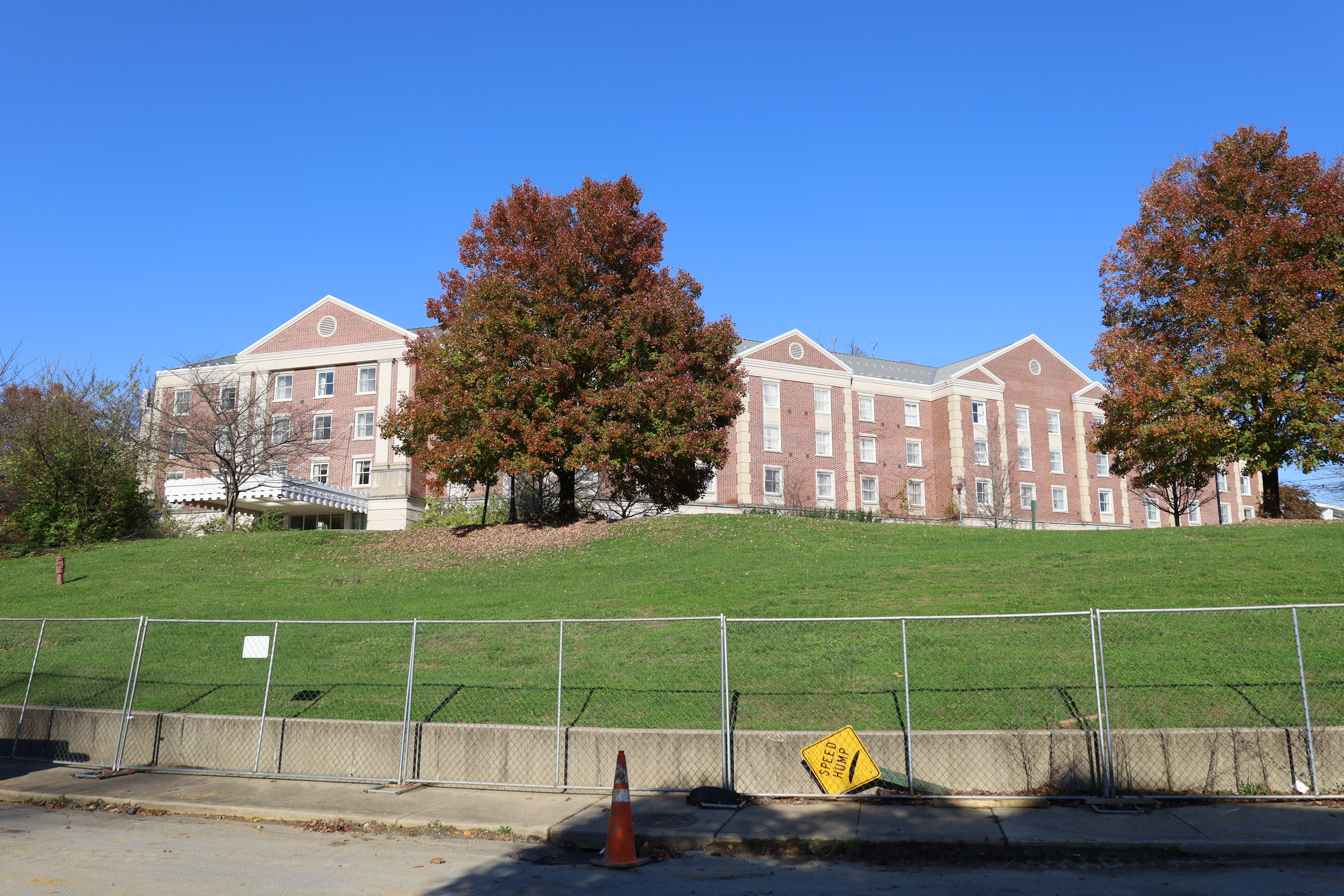
Mologne House

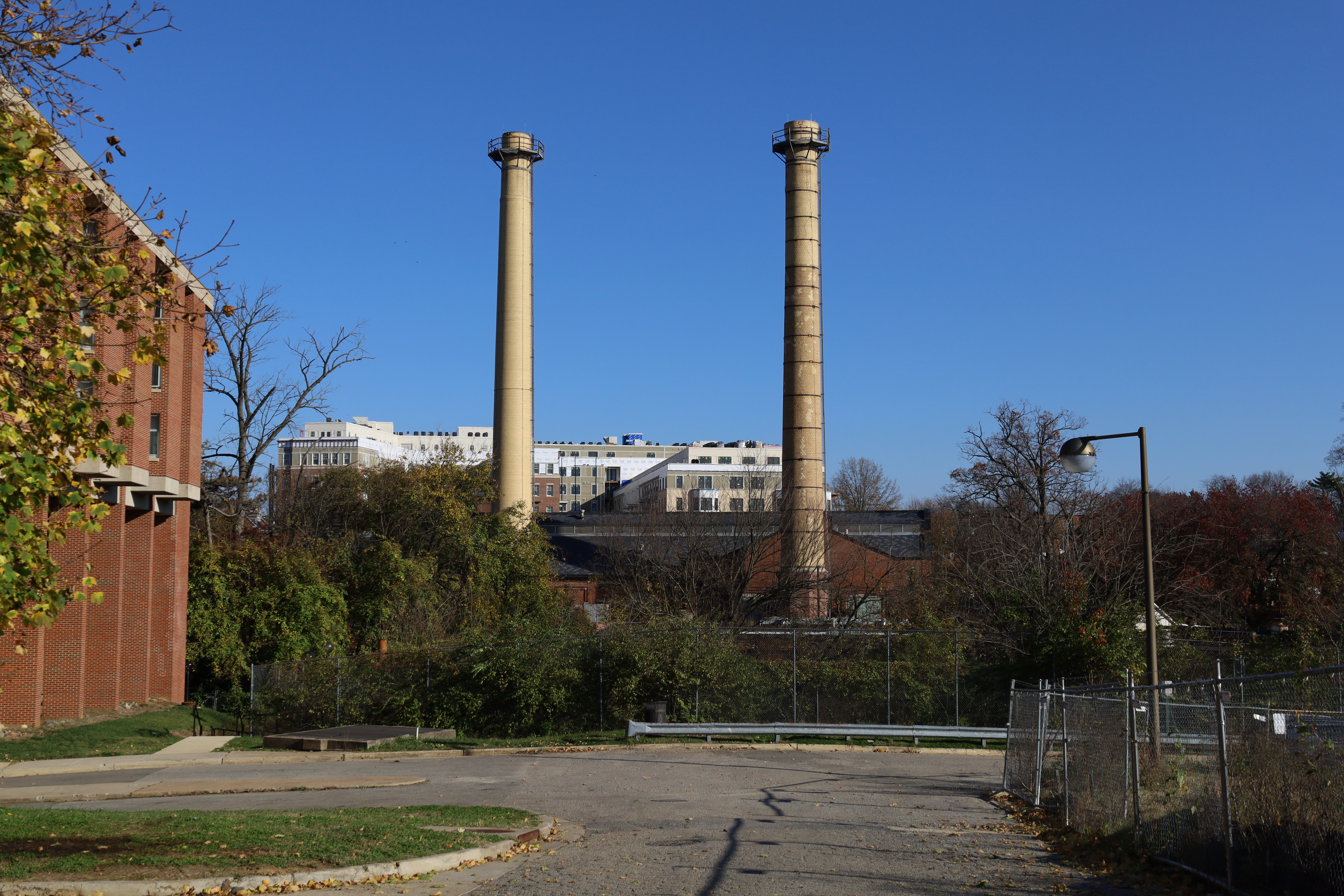
Power plant

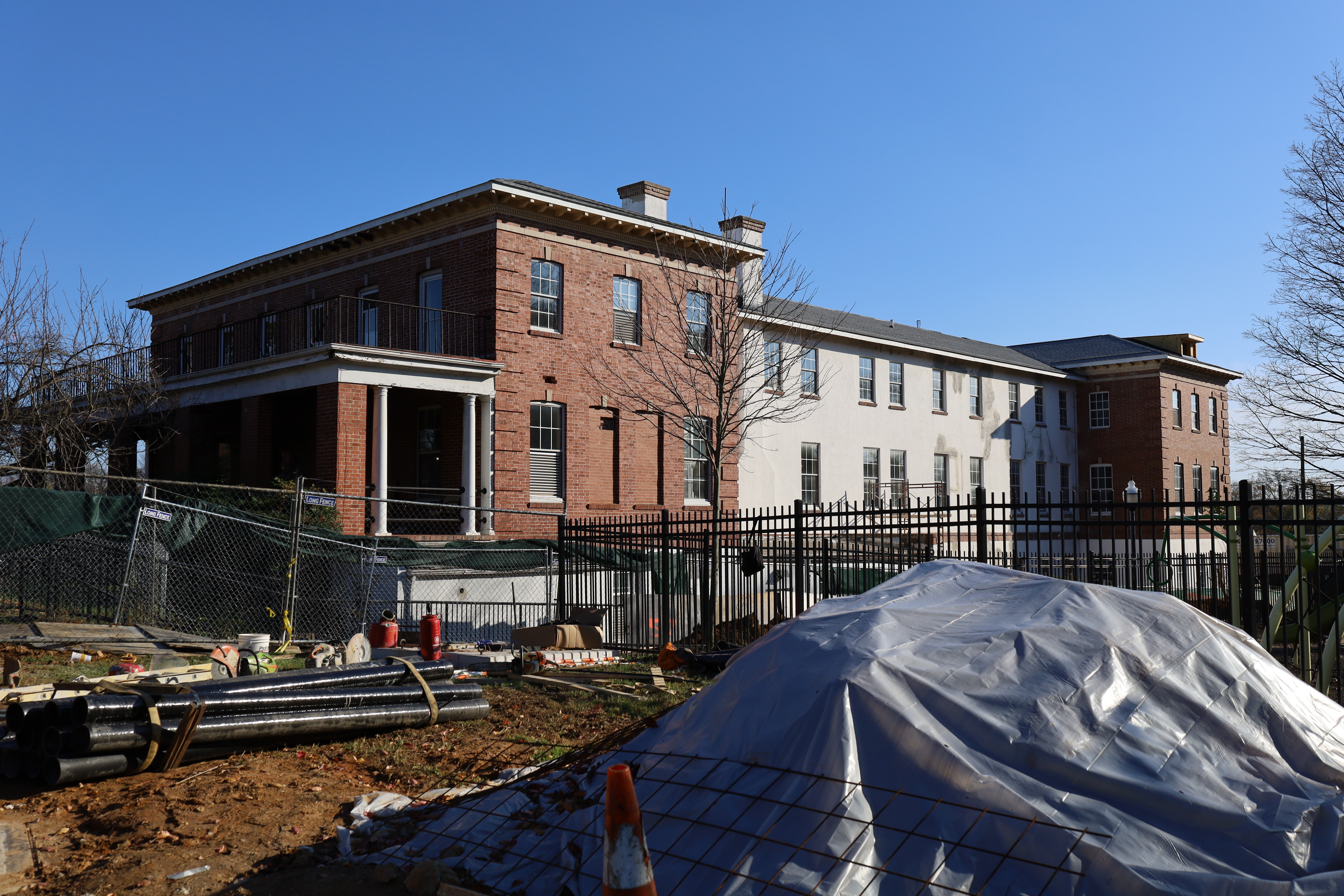
Doss Memorial Hall

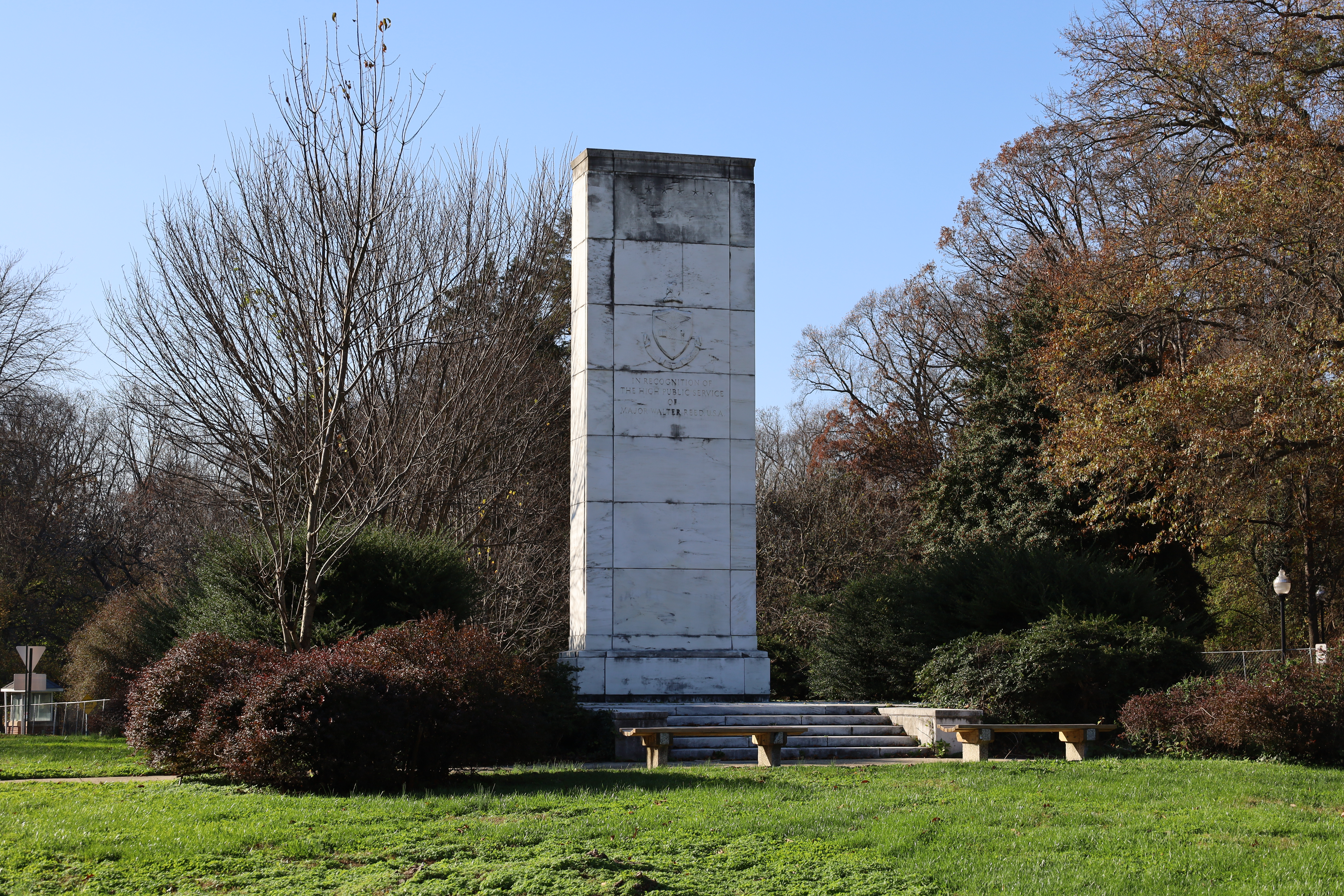
Walter Reed Monument

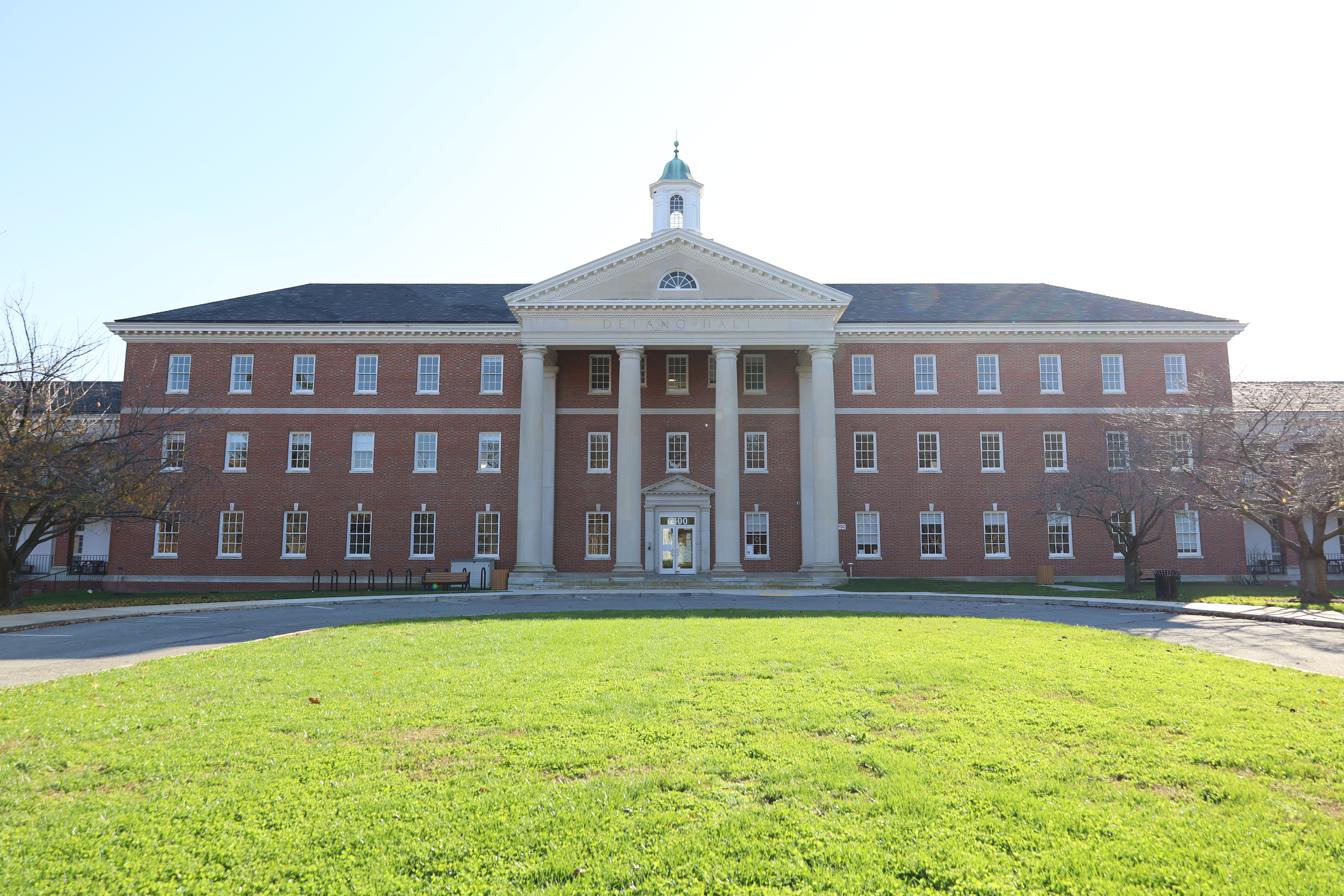
Delano Hall

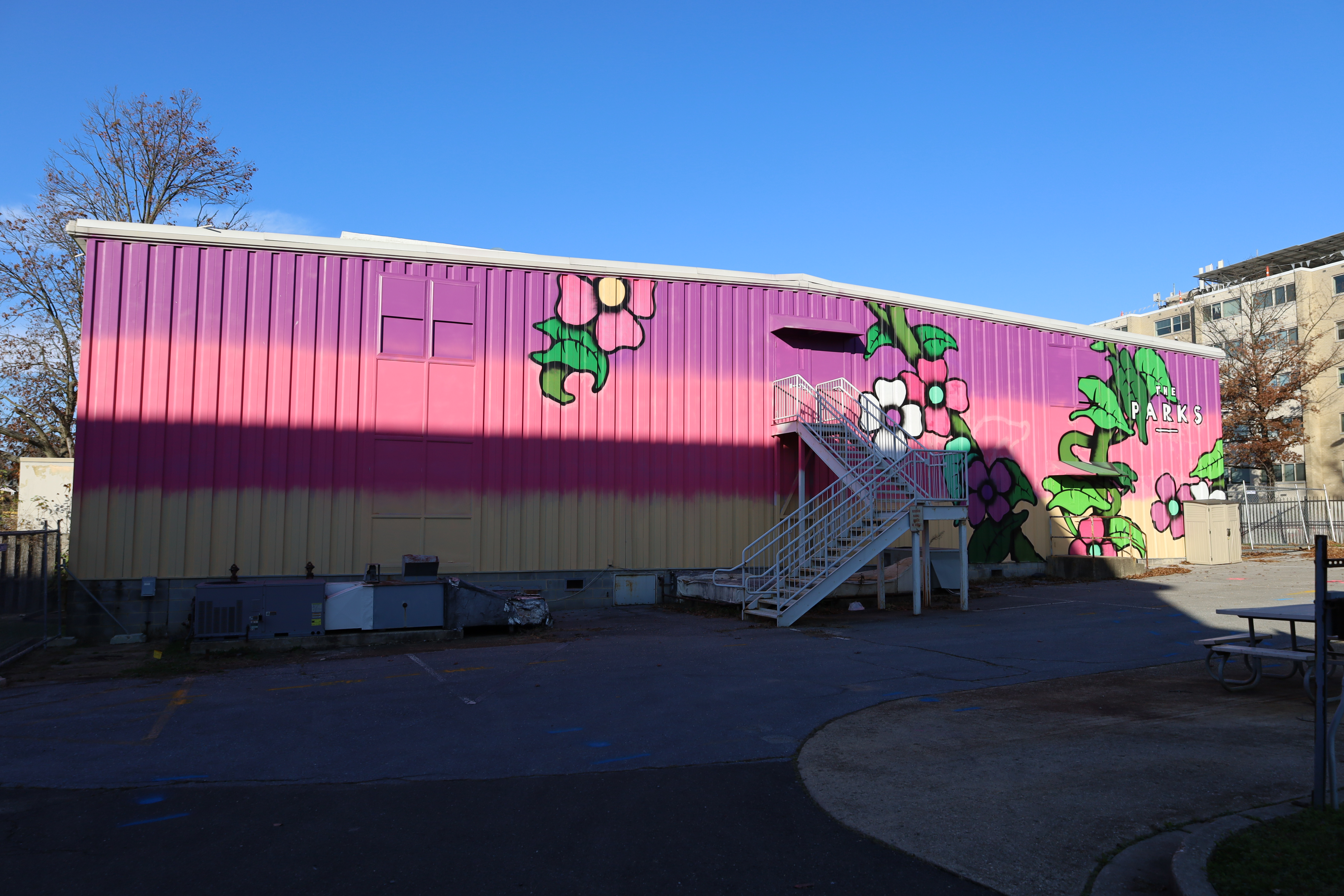
Building T20

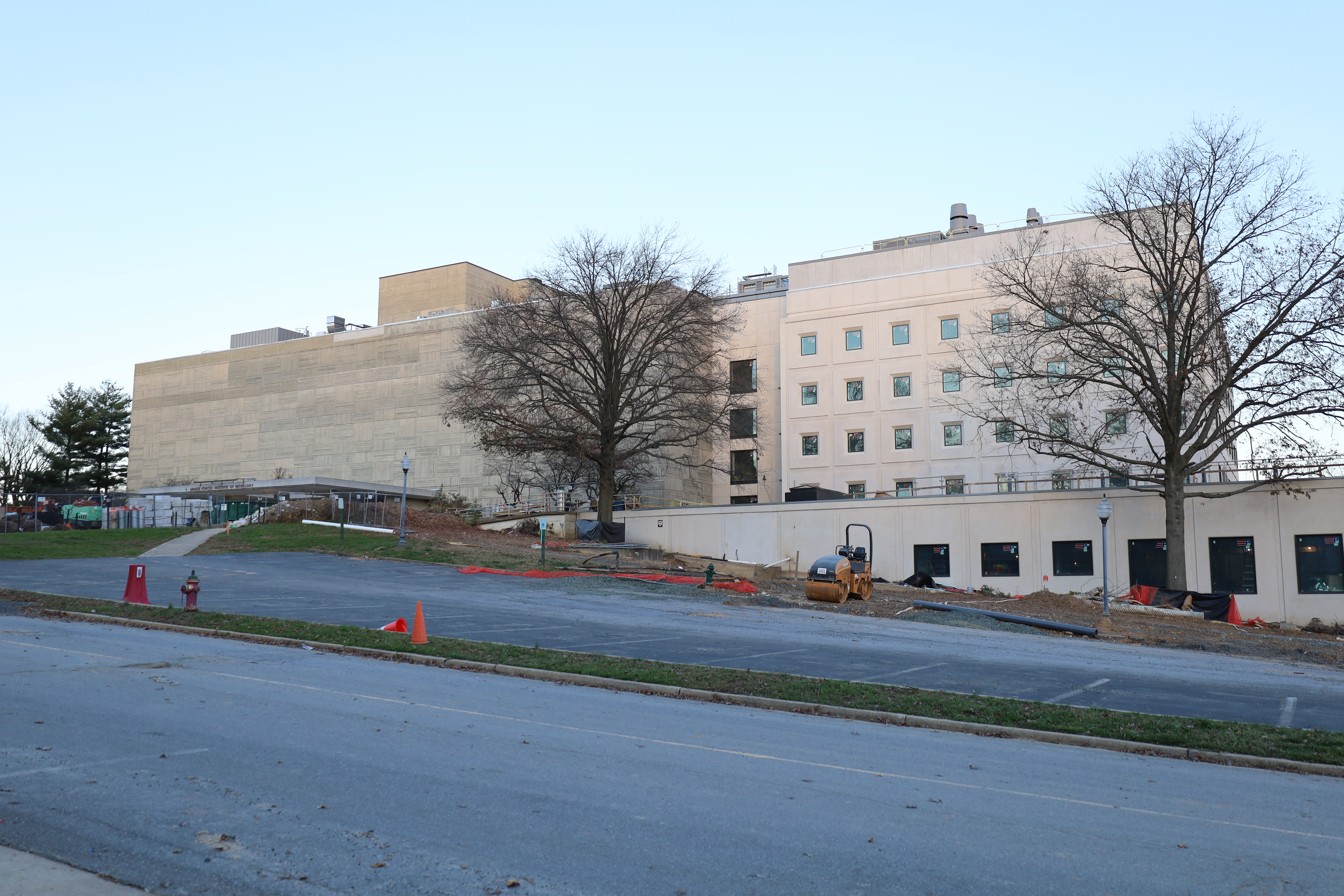
Armed Forces Institute of Pathology

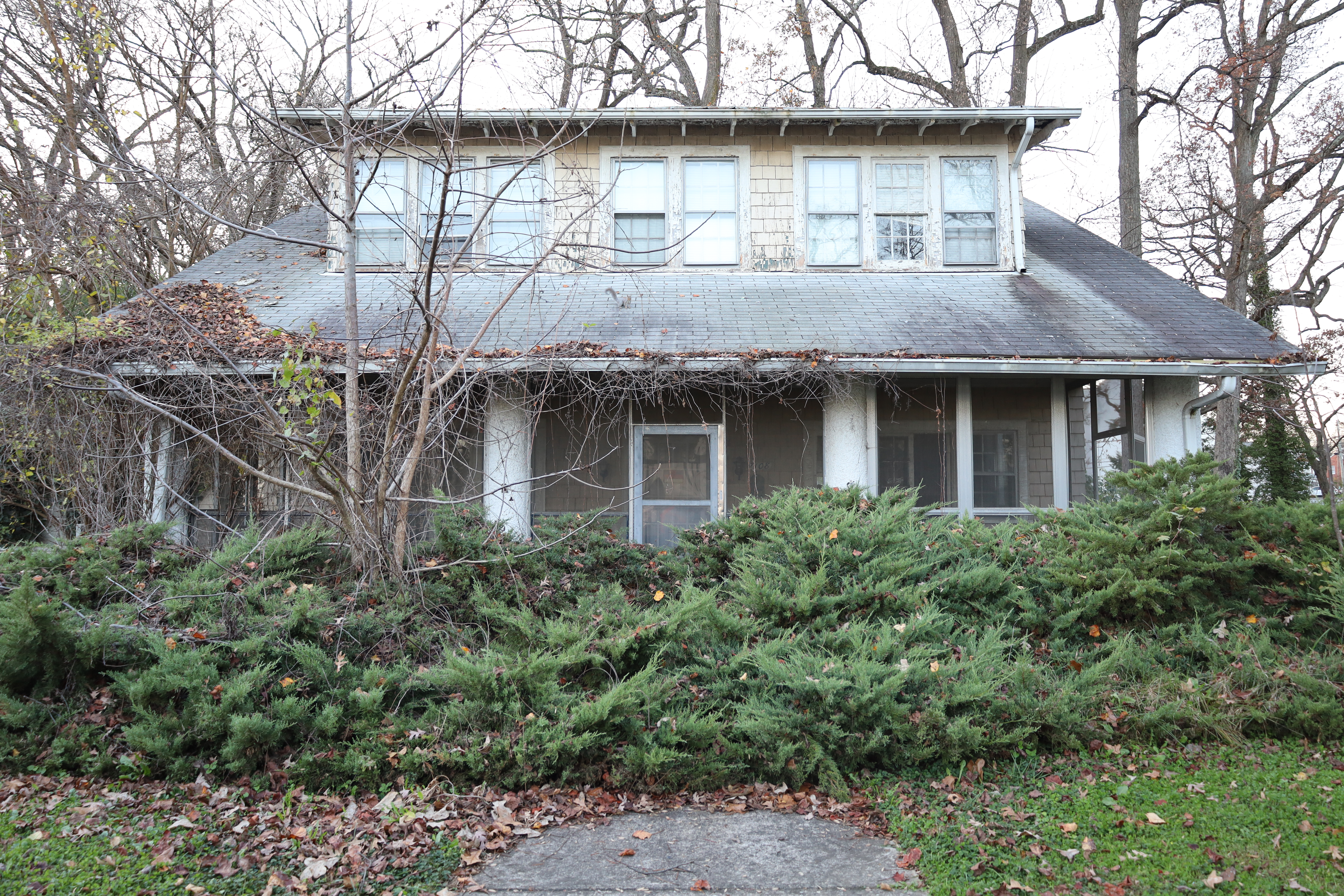
Building 21

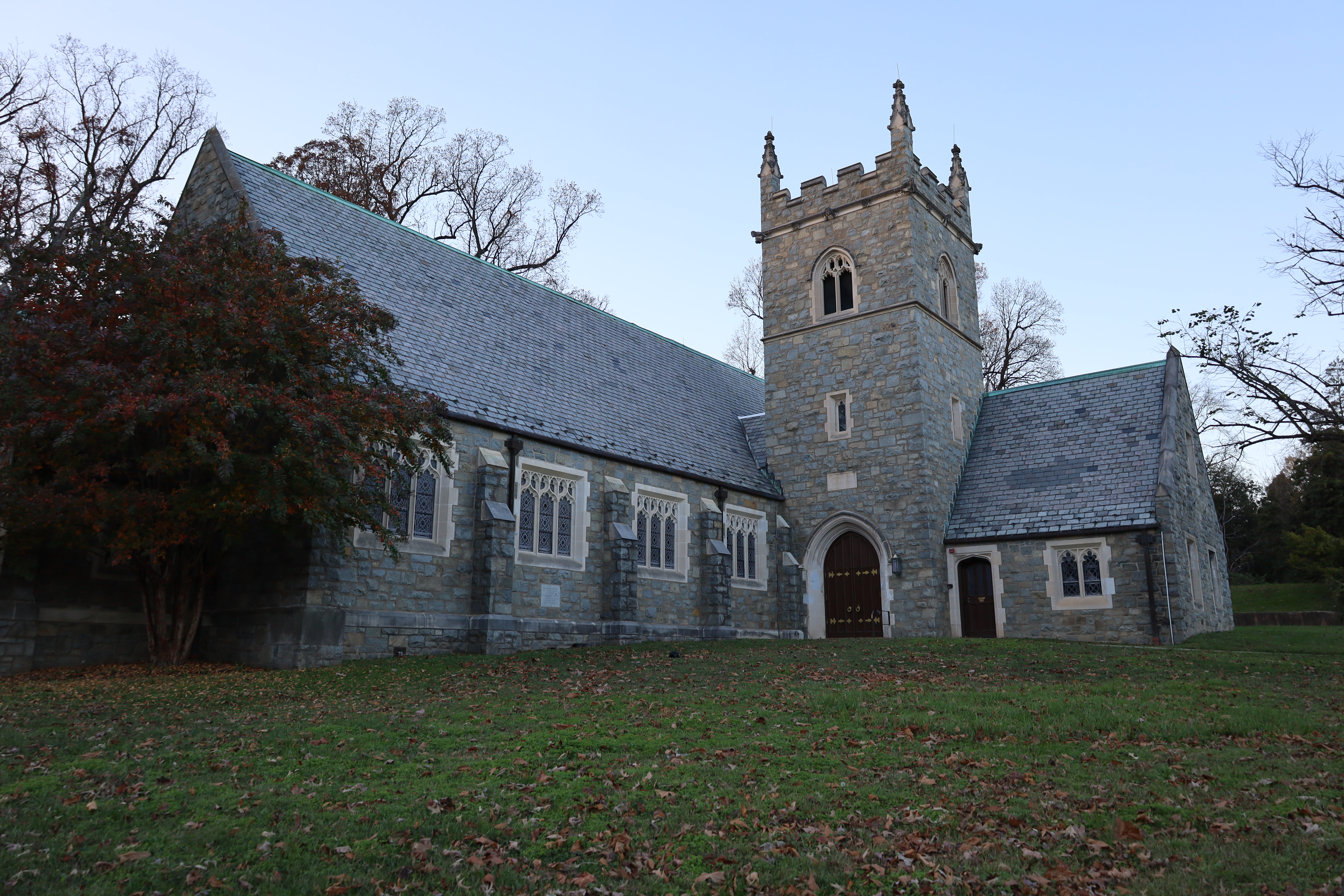
Memorial Chapel

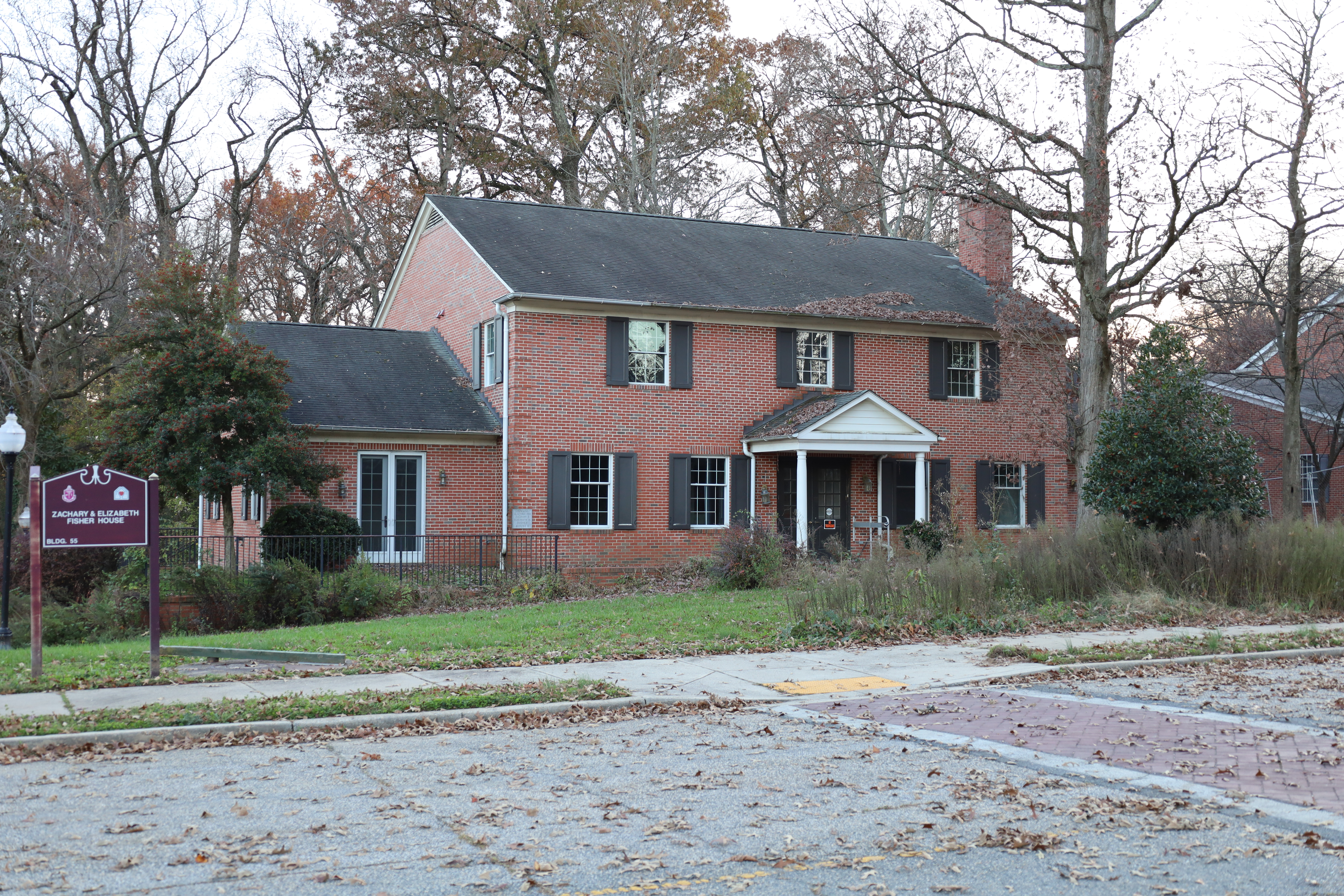
Fisher House

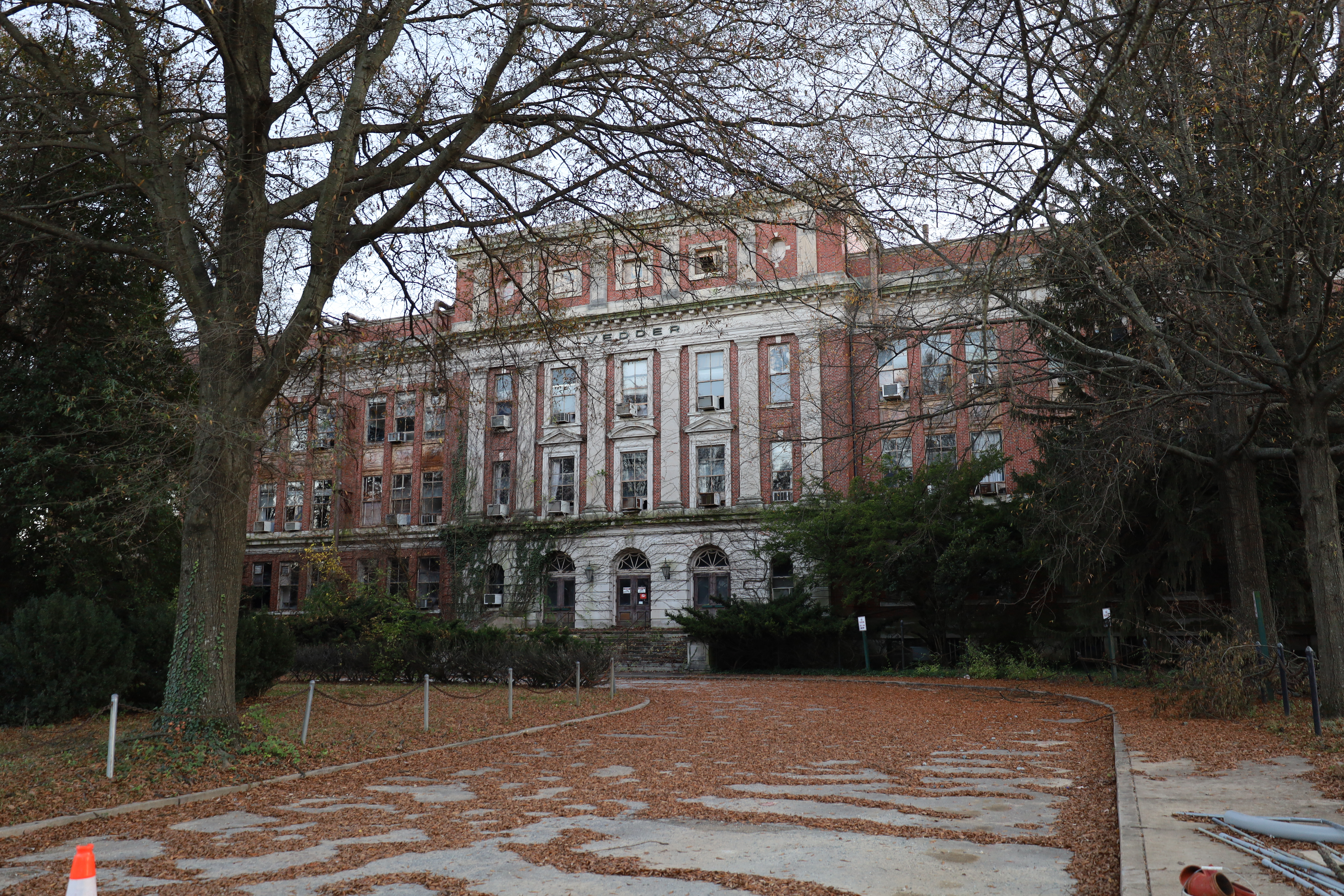
Walter Reed Army Institute of Research

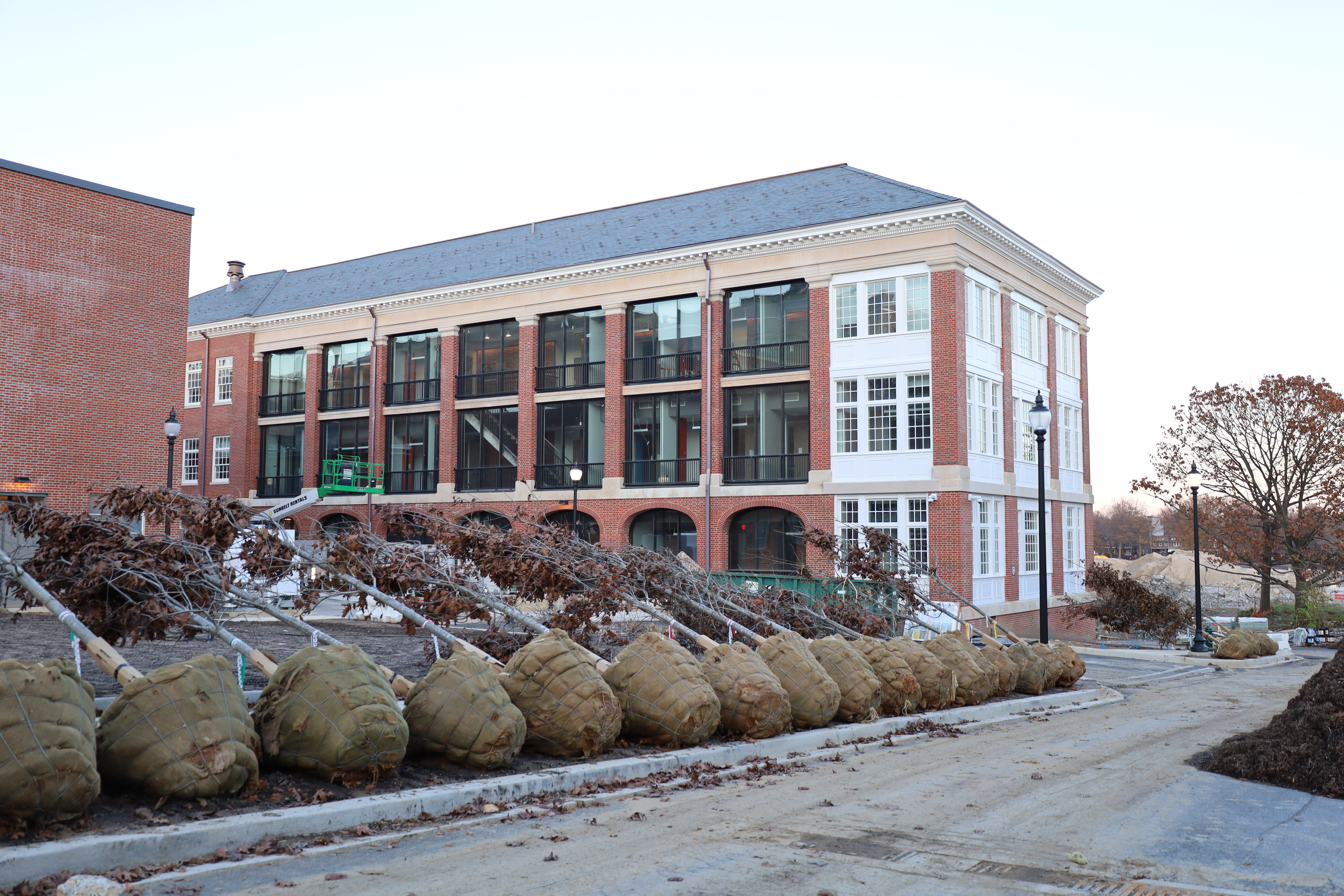
Building 52

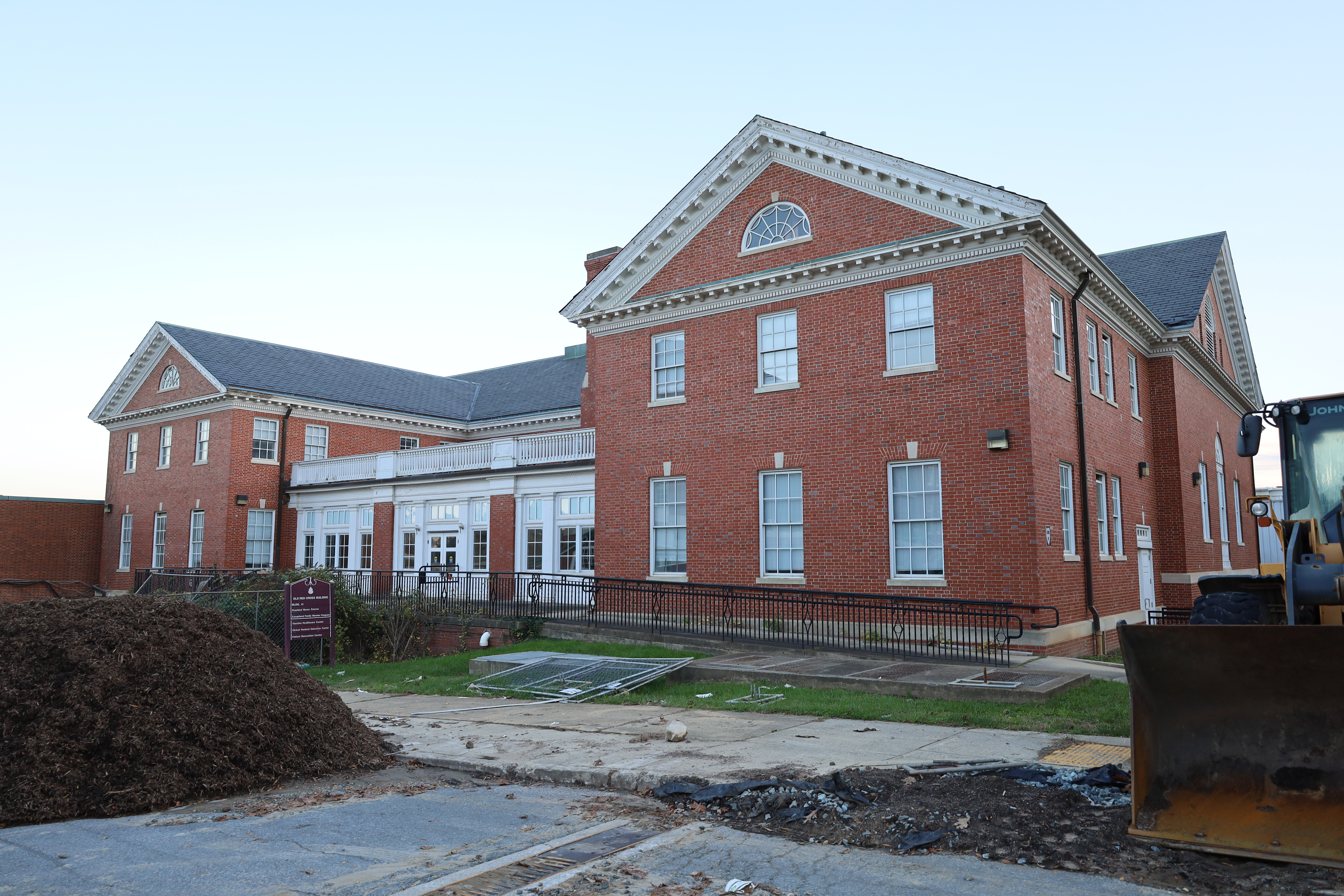
Old Red Cross Building

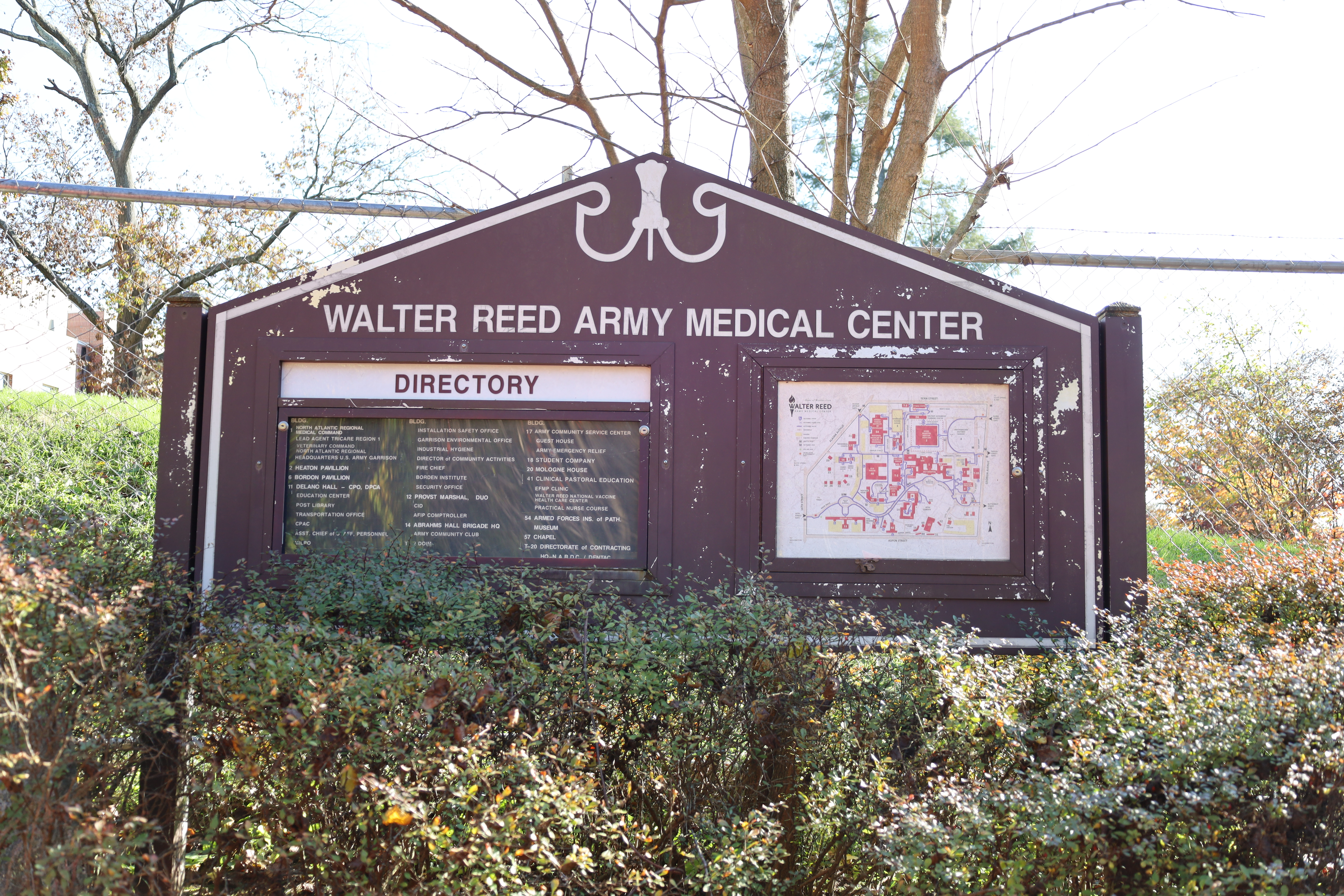
Campus map

== Notable patients ==
- WIlliam O. Douglas, Associate Justice, US Supreme Court, died at WRAMC in January 1980.
- Creighton W. Abrams (1914–1974) US Army Chief of Staff; Deputy Commander and commander, Military Assistance Command, Vietnam.
- Joseph Beacham (1874–1958) US Army Brigadier General, head football coach at Cornell and the United States Military Academy.
- Charles Billingslea (1914–1989) US Army Major General, recipient of two Distinguished Service Crosses.
- Aaron Bradshaw Jr. (1894–1976) US Army Major General, Commanding General, Anti-Aircraft Artillery, U.S. Fifth Army during World War II.
- Roger Brooke (1878–1940) US Army Brigadier General and physician, Namesake of Brooke Army Medical Center, Fort Sam Houston, Texas.
- Fox Conner (1874–1951) US Army major general, Deputy US Army Chief of Staff, "The man who made Eisenhower."
- Malin Craig (1875–1945) US Army General, US Army Chief of Staff 1935–1939
- Carl Rogers Darnall (1867–1941) US Army Brigadier General and physician. Credited with developing the technique of liquid chlorination of drinking water. Commander of the Army Medical Center 1929–31. Namesake of Carl R. Darnall Army Medical Center, Fort Cavazos, TX.
- Everett M. Dirksen (1896–1969) US Senator from Illinois.
- William J. Donovan (1883–1959) US Army Major General, Medal of Honor recipient and Office of Strategic Services founder.
- John Foster Dulles (1888–1959) US Secretary of State; US Senator from New York
- Dwight D. Eisenhower (1890–1969) General of the Army during World War II; Supreme Allied Commander, Europe; 34th President of the United States.
- Mamie Eisenhower (1896–1979) First Lady of the United States and wife of Dwight D. Eisenhower.
- Francis Henry French (1857–1921) US Army Major General.
- Leslie R. Groves (1896–1970) US Army Lieutenant General, Builder of the Pentagon (United States) and Leader of the Manhattan Project
- Paul Ramsey Hawley (1891–1965) US Army Major General; Chief Surgeon, European Theater of Operations 1943–45; Chief Medical officer, Veterans' Administration 1946–47.
- Leonard D. Heaton (1902–1983) US Army Lieutenant General. Surgeon General of the United States Army 1959–69. Commander of Walter Reed 1953–59.
- Leland Stanford Hobbs (1892–1966). US Army Major General; Commander of IX Corps and 30th Infantry Division in World War II.
- Edgar Erskine Hume (1889–1952) US Army Major General; Command Surgeon, US Far Eastern Command; Command Surgeon, UN Forces in Korea; Chief Surgeon, US Occupying Force in Austria.
- Merritte W. Ireland (1867–1952) US Army Major General; Surgeon General of the United States Army 1918–31. Namesake of Ireland Army Community Hospital, Fort Knox
- Cheddi Jagan (1918–1997) 4th President of Guyana, 1st Premier of British Guiana, and 1st Chief Minister of British Guiana
- Norman T. Kirk (1888–1960) US Army Major General; Surgeon General of the United States Army 1943–47.
- Julian Robert Lindsey (1871−1948), U.S. Brigadier General, Commander, 164th Infantry Brigade, 82nd Division, American Expeditionary Forces
- Douglas MacArthur (1880–1964) US General of the Army, Supreme Commander for the Allied Powers Southwest Pacific Area, US Army Chief of Staff, and U.S. Military Academy Superintendent.
- James C. Magee (1883–1975) US Army Major General; Surgeon General of the United States Army 1939–43.
- Mike Mansfield (1903–2001) US Senator from Montana. US Navy Seamen, US Army Private, and US Marine Corps Private First Class
- Peyton C. March (1864–1955) US Army Chief of Staff. US Army General
- George Catlett Marshall Jr. (1880–1959) US General of the Army, US Army Chief of Staff, Secretary of State, Secretary of Defense, Nobel Peace Laureate.
- John von Neumann (1903–1957), mathematician. Credited with developing the concept of mutual assured destruction.
- William Charles Ocker (1880–1942) American aviation pioneer, "Father of instrument flying."
- Mason Patrick (1863–1942) US Army Major General; Chief of United States Air Service; Chief of United States Air Corps
- John J. Pershing (1860–1948), U.S. General of the Armies, Commander, American Expeditionary Forces during World War I, US Army Chief of Staff.
- Chough Pyung-ok (1894–1960) South Korean politician.
- Walter L. Reed (1877–1956) US Army Major General; Inspector General of the U.S. Army; son of Major Walter Reed, namesake of the hospital
- Daniel Isom Sultan (1885–1947), U.S. Lieutenant General, CG 38th Infantry Division, CG VIII Corps, Deputy Commander Burma-India Theater, Inspector General of the U.S. Army
- William M. Wright (1863−1943), U.S. Lieutenant General, CG 89th Division, World War I

== Tenants ==
In addition to the WRAMC hospital complex, the WRAMC installation hosted a number of other related activities and organizations.

- The North Atlantic Regional Medical Command
- The North Atlantic Regional Dental Command
- The Armed Forces Institute of Pathology (AFIP)
- The Uniformed Services University of the Health Sciences (USUHS)
- United States Army Institute of Dental Research (USAIDR)
- The DOD Deployment Health Clinical Center
- The National Museum of Health and Medicine (NMHM) was co-located in the same building with the AFIP. The NMHM reopened 15 September 2011 on Fort Detrick Forest Glen Annex in Silver Spring, Maryland.
- The Borden Institute, a "Center of Excellence in Military Medical Research and Education".
- The Walter Reed Army Institute of Research (WRAIR), formerly in Building 40 on the Georgia Avenue campus. This medical research institute moved to WRAMC's Forest Glen Annex in 1999. In 2008, authority over the Annex was transferred to Fort Detrick in preparation for WRAMC's 2011 move/closure.

== Commanding officers ==
Although after 1992 officers of any branch of the Army Medical Department could command medical treatment facilities, every commander of the Walter Reed Army Medical Center was a member of the Army Medical Corps.

=== Walter Reed Army Medical Center ===
Image	Rank	Name	Begin date	End date	Notes
Carla G. Hawley-Bowland	Major General	Carla G. Hawley-Bowland	December 2007	29 July 2011	Cased the Medical Center colors
Eric B. Schoomaker	Major General	Eric B. Schoomaker	March 2007	November 2007	Later Surgeon General of the Army
Kevin C. Kiley	Lieutenant General	Kevin C. Kiley	1 March 2007	2 March 2007	Simultaneously serving as Surgeon General of the Army
George W. Weightman	Major General	George W. Weightman	August 2006	1 March 2007	
Kenneth L. Farmer Jr.	Major General	Kenneth L. Farmer Jr.	June 2004	August 2006	
Kevin C. Kiley	Major General	Kevin C. Kiley	June 2002	June 2004	Later Surgeon General of the Army
Harold G. Timboe	Major General	Harold L. Timboe	May 1999	June 2002	
Leslie M. Burger	Major General	Leslie M. Burger	November 1996	May 1999	
Ronald R. Blanck	Major General	Ronald R. Blanck	October 1992	October 1996	Later Surgeon General of the Army
Richard D. Cameron	Major General	Richard D. Cameron	May 1989	October 1992	Later Commanding General, United States Army Health Services Command
James E. Hastings	Colonel	James E. Hastings	March 1989	May 1989	
James H. Rumbaugh	Major General	James H. Rumbaugh	August 1988	March 1989	Died while in command
Lewis Malogne	Major General	Louis A. Malogne	June 1983	August 1988	Medically retired 1 August 1988; died 22 August 1988
Enrique Méndez Jr.	Major General	Enrique Méndez Jr.	October 1981	June 1983	Later Assistant Secretary of Defense (Health Affairs)
Bernard T. Mittemeyer	Major General	Bernard T. Mittemeyer	June 1980	September 1981	Later Surgeon General of the Army
George I. Baker	Major General	George I. Baker	March 1978	June 1980	
Robert Bernstein	Major General	Robert Bernstein	June 1973	February 1978	Previously Command Surgeon, Military Assistance Command Vietnam
William H. Moncrief	Major General	William H. Moncrief	May 1972	April 1973	
William H Meroney	Brigadier General	William H. Meroney	April 1972	May 1972	
Colin F. Vorder Bruegge	Major General	Colin F. Vorder Brugge	January 1971	March 1972	
Carl W. Hughes	Major General	Carl W. Hughes	November 1970	January 1971	
Glenn J. Collins	Major General	Glenn J. Collins	June 1969	October 1970	Previously Commanding General 44th Medical Brigade and Command Surgeon, United States Army, Vietnam
Philip W. Mallory	Major General	Phillip W. Mallory	May 1967	June 1969	
Douglas O. Kendrick	Major General	Douglas O. Kendrick	June 1965	March 1967	
Achilles Lacy Tynes	Major General	Achilles L. Tynes	September 1962	May 1965	
Clinton S. Lyter	Major General	Clinton S. Lyter	May 1961	September 1962	
C. F. St.John	Major General	C. F. St. John	July 1959	April 1961	
Leonard D. Heaton	Major General	Leonard D. Heaton	April 1953	June 1959	Later Surgeon General of the Army
Paul H. Streit	Major General	Paul H. Streit	September 1951	March 1953	

=== The Army Medical Center ===
Image	Rank	Name	Begin date	End date	Notes
Paul H. Streit	Major General	Paul H. Streit	January 1949	February 1951	
George C. Beach	Major General	George C. Beach	March 1946	November 1948	
Shelley U. Marietta	Major General	Shelly U. Marietta	February 1941	February 1946	
Raymond F. Metcalf	Brigadier General	Raymond F. Metcalfe	December 1939	January 1941	
Wallace C. DeWitt	Brigadier General	Wallace C. DeWitt	August 1935	December 1939	Namesake of former DeWitt Army Community Hospital, Fort Belvoir, Virginia
Albert E. Truby	Brigadier General	Albert E. Truby	January 1932	July 1935	As a lieutenant, Truby served under Walter Reed in Cuba during the yellow fever experiments
Carl R. Darnall	Brigadier General	Carl R. Darnall	December 1929	December 1931	Namesake of Carl R. Darnall Army Medical Center, Fort Cavazos, Texas
James M. Kennedy	Brigadier General	James M. Kennedy	March 1926	December 1929	
James D. Glennan	Brigadier General	James D. Glennan	March 1919	March 1926	

=== Walter Reed General Hospital ===
Image	Rank	Name	Begin date	End date	Notes
James D. Glennan	Brigadier General	James D. Glennan	March 1919	March 1926	
Edward R. Schreiner	Colonel	Edward R. Schreiner	August 1918	March 1919	
Willard F. Truby	Colonel	Willard F. Truby	November 1917	August 1918	
Charles P. Mason	Colonel	Charles P. Mason	October 1916	November 1917	
Percy M. Ashburn	Major	Percy M. Ashburn	September 1915	October 1916	
John L. Phillips	Colonel	John L. Phillips	May 1914	September 1915	
Henry C. "Pinky" Fisher	Colonel	Henry C. "Pinky" Fisher	August 1913	May 1914	
H. P. Birmingham	Colonel	H. P. Birmingham	October 1912	May 1913	
Charles Richard	Colonel	Charles Richard	September 1911	September 1912	
William Hemple Arthur	Colonel	William H. Arthur	1 June 1908	11 July 1911	Worked with Major Walter Reed at the Army Medical Bacteriological Laboratory while stationed at Fort Myer, Virginia, 1895–1897. Retired as a brigadier general in 1918.

== See also ==
- List of former United States Army medical units
- National Register of Historic Places listings in the upper NW Quadrant of Washington, D.C.
