= Robert Maitland O'Reilly =

Surgeon General of the United States Army (1845–1912)

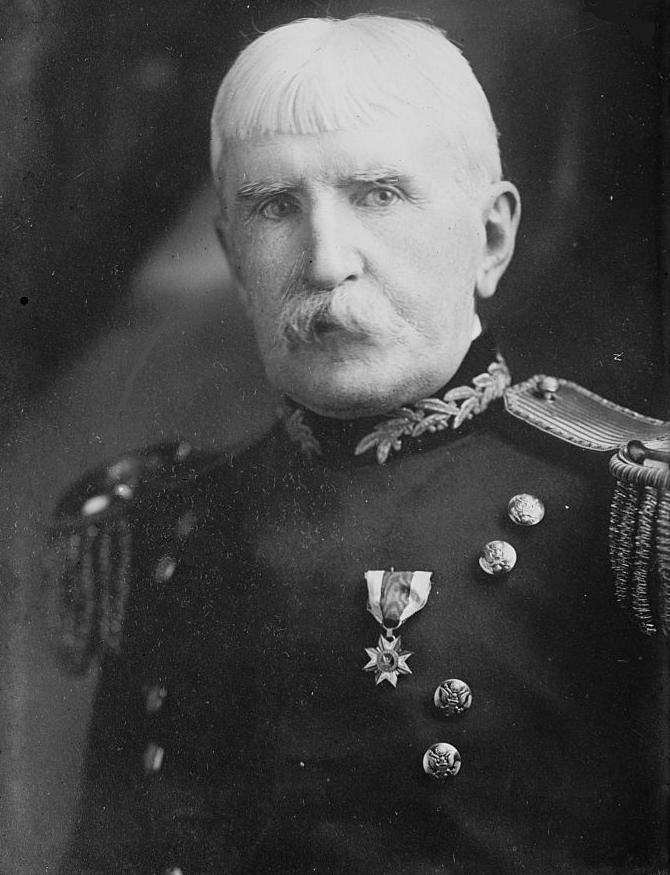
- Brigadier General Robert M. O'Reilly, Surgeon General of the Army, 1902–1909
- Born: January 14, 1845; Philadelphia, Pennsylvania
- Died: November 3, 1912 (aged 67); Washington, D.C.
- Burial place: Arlington National Cemetery
- Military career
- Allegiance: United States of America
- Branch: United States Army
- Service years: 1864–1865, 1867–1909
- Rank: Brigadier General
- Unit: US Army Medical Corps
- Conflicts: American Civil War; Indian Wars; Spanish–American War

Robert Maitland O'Reilly (January 14, 1845 – November 3, 1912) was the 20th Surgeon General of the United States Army, serving from September 7, 1902 to January 14, 1909.

O'Reilly was born in Philadelphia to John and Ellen (Maitland) O'Reilly. He was a descendant of General Alexander O'Reilly who was a captain general of Cuba and one of the Spanish governors of Louisiana. The American branch settled in Pennsylvania before the American Revolution. O'Reilly was educated in the public schools of his native city.

== Civil War ==
O'Reilly had commenced the study of medicine at the University of Pennsylvania when the Civil War broke out. In August 1862, he was appointed an acting medical cadet and was assigned for duty in Cuyler General Hospital in Philadelphia. Later he served as a medical cadet in a hospital at Chattanooga, Tennessee, and in the office of the medical director of the Army of the Cumberland.

== After the Civil War ==
With the close of the Civil War, he resumed his medical studies at the University of Pennsylvania and graduated 1866. On May 14, 1867, O'Reilly was appointed assistant surgeon in the army and sent to Fort Trumbull, Connecticut. Shortly thereafter he was sent out to California by way of Nicaragua with a shipment of recruits. While en route with recruits from San Francisco to Fort Whipple, Arizona, he was wounded by the accidental discharge of a revolver at Camp Mud Springs, California, and was under treatment for some time at Drum Barracks after which he proceeded to his original assignment in Arizona. He served at Camp Date Creek, Fort McDowell, Camp Renon, Fort Whipple, Camp Halleck, and Fort Union, all in the extreme southwest, until June 1870, during which time he saw considerable field service against Native Americans. Mid-1870 was spent in the field in Colorado with the 8th Cavalry, after which he was assigned for station at Fort Laramie, Wyoming, where he served from May 1871 to July 1874. He participated in the campaign of 1874 against the Sioux and at the conclusion of that campaign he took station at Fort D. A. Russell at Cheyenne, Wyoming. In June 1875 he was ordered east, and given short tours of duty at Fort McHenry, Maryland, and at Fort Hamilton, New York. In November 1875 he was sent to Fort Ontario, New York, which was his station until May 1878. While at this station he was detailed, in 1877, to duty incident to labor disturbances in Pennsylvania, and sustained an injury which incapacitated him to a remarkable extent for two years.

Short terms of duty at Charleston, South Carolina, and Fort McPherson, Georgia, interspersed with sick leaves brought him to the summer of 1882, when in June he was ordered to duty with the attending surgeon in Washington, D. C. In November 1884 he himself became the attending surgeon, which post he held until November 1889. In this capacity his attractive personality and his professional skill made him a prominent figure in the capital. He was made the attending physician to the White House by President Grover Cleveland, with whom he was on terms of intimate friendship and who brought him back to Washington during his second term in the presidency. From June to September 1888 he attended General Philip Sheridan during his last illness at Nonquitt, Massachusetts. From Washington he was ordered to Fort Logan, Colorado, where he served from May 1890 to February 1893 when he was again detailed as attending surgeon at the capital.

== Spanish–American War ==
In April 1897 he was assigned to duty at Fort Wayne, Michigan, and from this post he accompanied the troops into the field at the onset of the Spanish–American War. Arriving at Mobile, Alabama, he was assigned as chief surgeon of the First Independent Division commanded by Major General John J. Coppinger. He was later chief surgeon of the 4th Army Corps and still later chief surgeon on the staff of Major General James F. Wade in Havana. The medical department ship Bay State was placed at his disposal and he was sent to Jamaica for the purpose of acquiring information relative to the experience of the British Army in tropical hygiene. He made a study of the housing, food, clothing, and care of troops and submitted a report with recommendations on these subjects which were of material value.

Returning from Cuba in November 1899 he commanded Josiah Simpson Hospital at Fortress Monroe, Virginia, and later was transferred to the headquarters of the Department of California at San Francisco as chief surgeon.

In the passing years he had been rising in the military scale. Promoted to captain on May 14, 1870, to major on November 1, 1886, and to lieutenant colonel on February 21, 1900, he reached the grade of colonel on February 14, 1902.

== Surgeon General of the Army ==
At the time of Surgeon General William H. Forwood's retirement in September 1902 there was a regulation in effect that the appointment to Surgeon General should be for a period of four years, and a ruling that the appointee must have four years to serve before his compulsory retirement for age. There was a small group of brilliant officers on the list ahead of Colonel O'Reilly, notably Colonels Smart, Lippincott, and DeWitt, but all were barred from the coveted place by lack of the necessary four years to serve. Colonel O'Reilly, the senior officer able to meet the requirements, was appointed Surgeon General with the grade of brigadier general on September 7, 1902.

Up to this time it had been the almost invariable custom that the office assistants of the Surgeon General should be selected from among the senior officers of the corps. General O'Reilly departed from the long-time custom by surrounding himself with a group of young, alert, active men, a group that went far toward directing the fortunes of the corps for the next two decades. To this group belonged Jefferson R. Kean, Walter D. McCaw, Charles F. Mason, and James D. Glennan, all junior majors, and Merritte Webber Ireland, Francis T. Winter, Charles Lynch, and Carl R. Darnall who had still to gain that grade when O'Reilly's term began. Kean was made executive officer and the others assigned to the charge of divisions into which the office was organized. Unsatisfactory conditions in the army disclosed by the Spanish–American War caused the appointment by President William McKinley of the Dodge Commission. The findings of this commission relating to the medical department took the form of a number of recommendations which it devolved upon O'Reilly to carry out.

These recommendations were briefly as follows: (1) a larger force of commissioned medical officers, (2) authority to establish in time of peace a proper volunteer hospital corps, (3) a nurse corps of selected trained women nurses ready to serve whenever necessity should arise, (4) a year's supply, for an army of at least four times the normal strength, of all medicines, hospital furniture, and stores as are not materially damaged by keeping, to be held constantly on hand in the medical supply depots, (5) charge of transportation to such in extent as will secure prompt shipment and ready delivery of all medical supplies, (6) simplification of administrative paper work, (7) provision for purchase by subsistence funds of articles of special diets for the sick.

In his last annual report, that of 1908, O'Reilly was able to say that all of these objectives had been realized or were in good prospect of realization. O'Reilly and his staff achieved a relation with the army, with Congress, with the medical profession, and with the public never visualized by any previous administration. During his term every medical department activity was studied, overhauled, and improved. Toward the latter part of his term an appropriation was obtained from Congress for the purchase of the site and for the beginning of construction of a general hospital in Washington—Walter Reed General Hospital—a project under advisement since the days of General Hammond.

== Accomplishments ==
Perhaps the outstanding accomplishment of this regime was the increase and reorganization of the Medical Corps and the Hospital Corps, with the elimination of the meaningless titles carried by medical officers and the substitution of the titles sergeant and corporal for the obsolete titles of noncommissioned officers. This reorganization act of April 23, 1908 (35 Stat. 66), also created the Medical Reserve Corps. O'Reilly was president of the board which recommended the adoption of typhoid prophylaxis for the army. In 1906 he reconstituted the Board for the Study of Tropical Diseases in Manila and set for it certain objectives. In that same year he represented the United States at the international conference at Geneva, Switzerland, for the revision of the Geneva Convention. At the expiration of his first term of appointment in 1906 he was reappointed and served until the time for his compulsory retirement for age on January 14, 1909. Never of strong constitution and the subject of much ill health during his army career, his remaining three years were spent quietly in a state of semi-invalidism in Washington, where he died of uremic poisoning, on November 3, 1912.

O'Reilly's only notable written contribution was the monograph on military surgery which appeared in the fourth edition of W. W. Keen's American Textbook of Surgery (1903), in which he collaborated with Major William C. Borden.

O'Reilly studied music and culture. He played the violin and participated in chamber music. He maintained a military bearing and established friendships through his musical activities.

A convalescent hospital ship in service during World War I was named after him. The World War II military hospital, O'Reilly General Hospital, was named for him.

== Personal life ==
He was married on August 6, 1877, to Frances L. Pardee of Oswego, New York, who, with one daughter, survived him. His only son predeceased him.
