= Elder Granger =

United States Army general

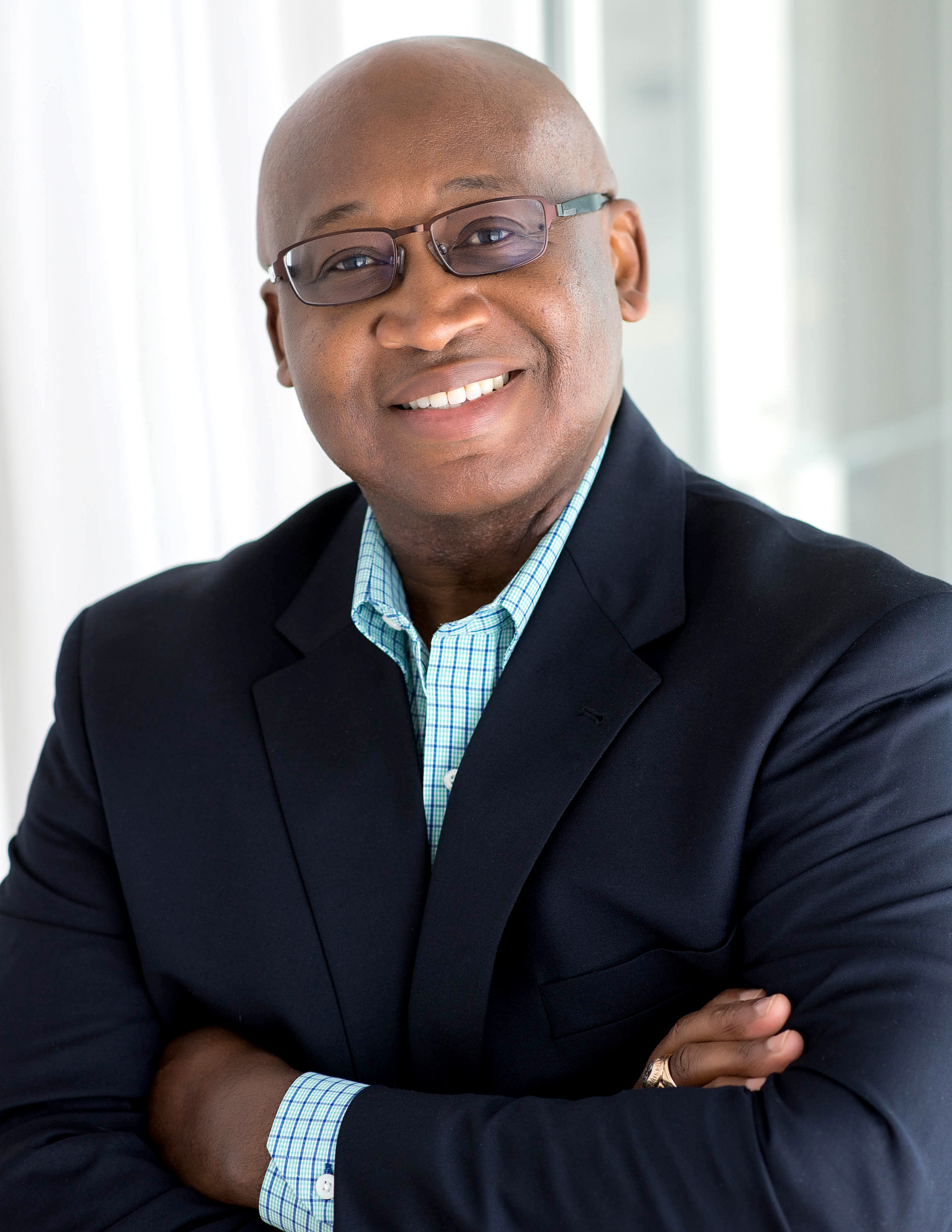
- Born: January 13, 1954 (age 72); West Memphis, Arkansas, U.S.
- Military career
- Allegiance: United States
- Branch: United States Army
- Service years: 1971–2009
- Rank: Major General
- Commands: 44th Medical Command; Landstuhl Regional Medical Center; European Regional Medical Command; Ireland Army Community Hospital
- Conflicts: Iraq War
- Awards: Defense Superior Service Medal; Legion of Merit (3); Bronze Star Medal

Elder Granger (born January 13, 1954) is a retired major general of the United States Army who served as a deputy director and program executive officer of TRICARE Management Activity.

== Early life and education ==
Granger was born on January 13, 1954, in West Memphis, Arkansas. He graduated cum laude with a Bachelor of Science in zoology from Arkansas State University (ASU) in 1976, where he received several academic honors. Later, he obtained his Doctor of Medicine from the University of Arkansas for Medical Sciences in 1980. After graduating from the University of Arkansas School of Medicine for Health Sciences, Granger was awarded the Henry Kaiser Medical Fellowship for Medical Excellence and Leadership. He completed a residency in internal medicine in 1983 and a fellowship in hematology-oncology in 1986 at Fitzsimons Army Medical Center.

== Military career ==
Granger began his military career in 1971 as a combat medic in the Arkansas National Guard. He was commissioned through the Reserve Officers' Training Corps (ROTC) as a distinguished military graduate.

Elder Granger's first overseas assignment was at the Second General Hospital in Landstuhl, Germany, where from 1987 to 1992, as a major, he served as chief of the Department of Medicine and Hematology-Oncology Service. During his tenure, he coordinated triage and bed allocations for casualties from Operation Desert Storm in 1991.

From 1992 to 1994, Granger was the deputy commander for clinical services at Raymond W. Bliss Army Community Hospital at Fort Huachuca, Arizona. He then served as the division surgeon for the 4th Infantry Division at Fort Carson, Colorado, from 1994 to 1995, where he was the senior medical adviser to the Division Commander, Major General Tom Schwartz.

Following the closure of Fitzsimons Army Medical Center in 1995, Granger returned to Aurora, Colorado to oversee the shutdown of the hematology-oncology service. He then attended the Army War College in Carlisle, Pennsylvania, before taking command of Ireland Army Community Hospital at Fort Knox, Kentucky, where he was tasked with improving the efficiency of what was considered the most inefficient and non-cost-effective hospital operated by the Department of Defense.

In 1999, Granger assumed command at Landstuhl Regional Medical Center in Germany, where he was responsible for upgrading the hospital's medical equipment for the millennium transition and managing the arrival of casualties from the USS Cole bombing in 2000. During this period, he also developed his skills in handling media by conducting regular briefings for the international press.

Granger served as the acting assistant surgeon general for force projection in Falls Church, Virginia, before returning to Europe to lead the Europe Regional Medical Command in Heidelberg, Germany. The role included the oversight of three Army hospitals and 27 medical clinics, serving as the senior Army medical adviser in Europe and as the TRICARE lead agent for the region.

In 2003, as the V Corps deployed to Iraq, Granger coordinated the medical and dental preparation of troops, sending trained medical forces with them and preparing Landstuhl as the primary receiving hospital. He was at Landstuhl to welcome recovered prisoners of war Pfc. Jessica Lynch and her family.

In August 2004, Granger was stationed at Fort Bragg as the XVIII Airborne Corps command surgeon, director of health services, and commander of the 44th Medical Command. He deployed to Iraq later that year, leading 5,000 medical troops and serving as the command surgeon for the Multinational Corps Iraq, for which he was awarded the Bronze Star Medal.

From December 2005 to May 2009, Granger served as the deputy director and program executive officer of the TRICARE Management Activity within the Office of the Assistant Secretary of Defense (Health Affairs) in Washington, D.C. In this capacity, Granger acted as the principal advisor to the Assistant Secretary of Defense (Health Affairs), providing guidance on Department of Defense health plan policy and performance. As deputy director of TRICARE Management Activity, Granger managed a staff of over 1,800 and was responsible for a Defense Health Program budget of $22.5 billion.

During his military career, Granger held numerous high-level positions within the Army Medical Department. His assignments included commanding the 44th Medical Command and serving as the XVIII Airborne Corps command surgeon at Fort Bragg, North Carolina; leading the European Regional Medical Command in Germany; acting as the Assistant Surgeon General for Force Projection at the Office of the Surgeon General in Virginia; commanding the Landstuhl Regional Medical Center in Germany; and serving as the division surgeon for the 4th Infantry Division at Fort Carson, Colorado. Additionally, he was the deputy commander for clinical services at Raymond W. Bliss Army Community Hospital, Fort Huachuca.

In July 2009, Granger retired from the U.S. Army. Since 2009, he has been the president and CEO of The 5Ps, LLC.

In 2020, Granger was inducted into the Army ROTC Hall of Fame.

== Awards and decorations ==
Defense Superior Service Medal
Legion of Merit with three bronze oak leaf clusters
Bronze Star Medal
