= 261st Medical Battalion =

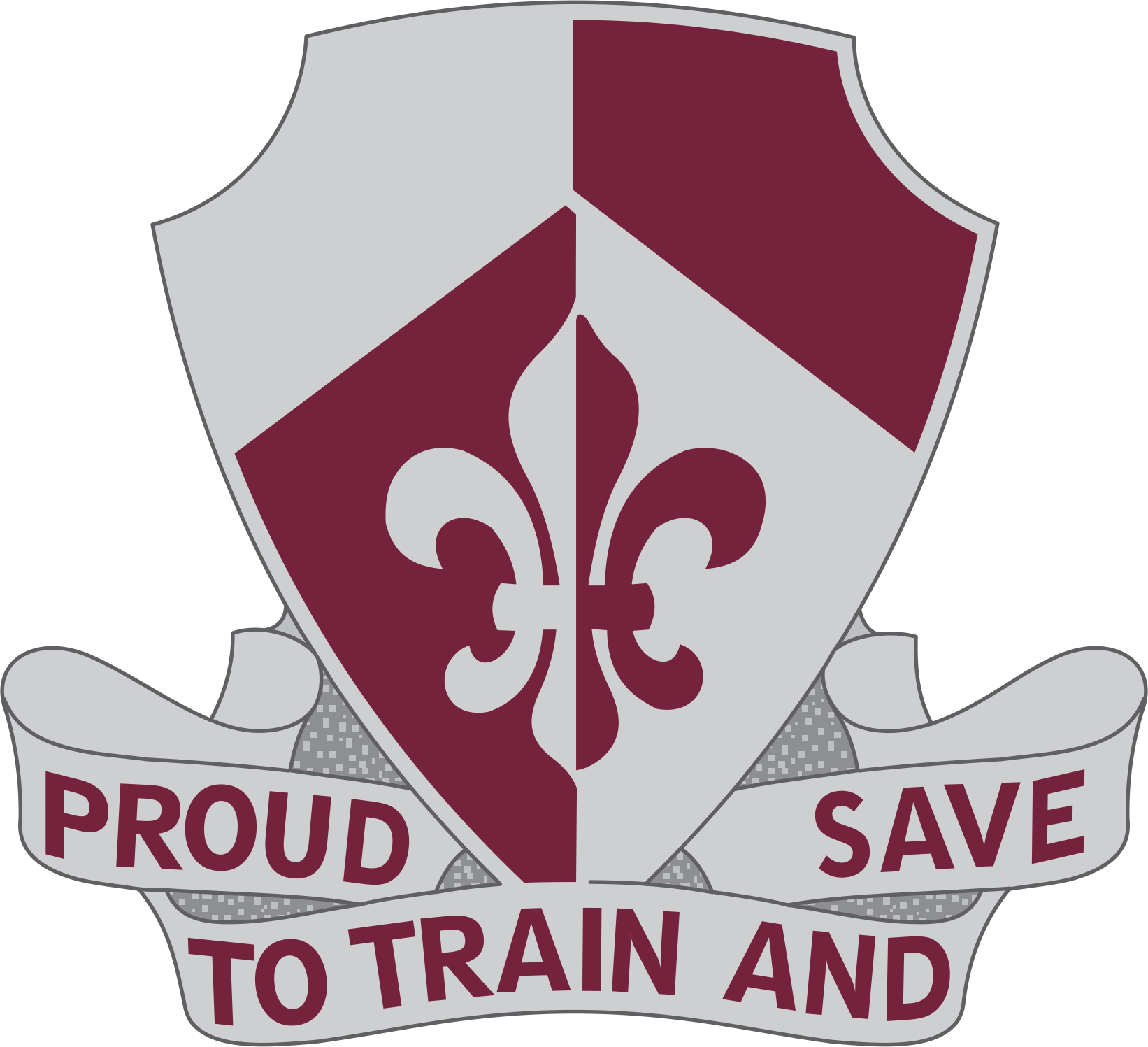
- Distinctive Unit Insignia
- Active: 15 June 1942 – 28 January 1945; 16 September 1992 – present
- Country: US
- Branch: Regular Army
- Garrison/HQ: Fort Bragg, North Carolina
- Nickname: "Spearhead Medics"
- Mottos: "Proud to Train and Save"
- Colors: Maroon and White
- Mascot: Warthog
- Engagements: World War II; Sicily; Naples-Foggia campaign Rome-Arno campaign Normandy; Northern France; Iraqi Governance; National Resolution; Iraqi Surge

Commanders
- Current commander: LTC Francis G. Cicchini
- Notable commanders: LTG R. Scott Dingle, Surgeon General of the United States Army MG Robert D. Tenhet, Deputy Surgeon General of the United States Army BG Jamie D. Burk, Chief, Army Nurse Corps

The 261st Medical Battalion is a Multifunctional Medical Battalion of the US Army located at Fort Bragg, North Carolina, under the command and control of the 44th Medical Brigade. It provides a flexible and modular medical battle command, administrative assistance, logistical support, and technical supervision capability for assigned and attached medical organizations (companies and detachments), which can be task-organized to support deployed forces.

== Command Group ==
- Commander: LTC Frank G. Cicchini
- Command Sergeant Major: CSM Ryan. F O'Connell
- Executive Officer: MAJ Dana Messer

== Commanders ==
Rank	Name	Branch	Dates
1LT	Howard F. Conn	MC	15 June 1942 – 30 June 1942
CPT	Edward L. Tuckey	MC	30 June 1942 – 17 July 1942
LTC	Merle E. Smith	MC	17 July 1942 – November 1944
MAJ	Daniel I. Dann	MC	November 1944 – 28 January 1945

Rank	Name	Branch	Dates
LTC	Edgar B. "Butch" Murphy	MS	16 September 1992 – 12 July 1994
LTC	Phil Navin	MS	12 July 1994 – July 1996
LTC	Gary L. Sadlon	MS	July 1996 – 24 July 1998
LTC	Timothy D. Gordon	MS	24 July 1998 – 12 July 2000
LTC	J. Cole Slattery	MS	12 July 2000 – 12 July 2002
LTC	Robert D. Tenhet	MS	12 July 2002 – July 2004
LTC	William C. Terry	MS	July 2004 – 2006
LTC	Frank L. Christopher	MC	2006 – February 2009
LTC	R. Scott Dingle	MS	February 2009 – March 2010
LTC	Myron B. McDaniels	MC	March 2010 – March 2012
LTC	Heather A. Kness	MS	March 2012 – 10 June 2014
LTC	Jamie D. Burk	AN	10 June 2014 – 10 June 2016
LTC	J. Aric Bowman	MS	10 June 2016 – 11 May 2018
LTC	Kevin Kelly	MC	11 May 2018 – 9 June 2020
LTC	Benjamin P. Donham	MC	9 June 2020 – 7 June 2022
LTC	Christina B. Rumayor	MC	7 June 2022 – 2024

== Lineage and honors ==
- Constituted 12 June 1942 in the Regular Army as the 261st Medical Battalion
- Activated 15 June 1942 at Camp Edwards, Massachusetts
- Disbanded on 28 January 1945, in France.
- Reconstituted 1 October 1991 in the Regular Army
- Activated 16 September 1992 at Fort Bragg, North Carolina
- Reorganized 16 August 2002 to consist of Headquarters and Headquarters Detachment, 261st Medical Battalion (organic elements concurrently inactivated)

=== Campaign participation credit ===
- World War II:
1. Sicily (with Arrowhead)
2. Naples-Foggia
3. Rome-Arno
4. Normandy (with Arrowhead)
5. Northern France
- The War on Terrorism in Iraq:
1. Iraqi Governance
2. National Resolution
3. Iraqi Surge
4. Additional Campaigns to be determined

=== Decorations ===
- Presidential Unit Citation (Army), streamer embroidered NORMANDY
- Meritorious Unit Commendation (Army) for:
1. Iraq 2005
2. Iraq 2007–2008
3. Iraq 2010–2011
- French Croix de Guerre With Palm, World War II, streamer embroidered NORMANDY BEACHES

== Distinctive unit insignia ==
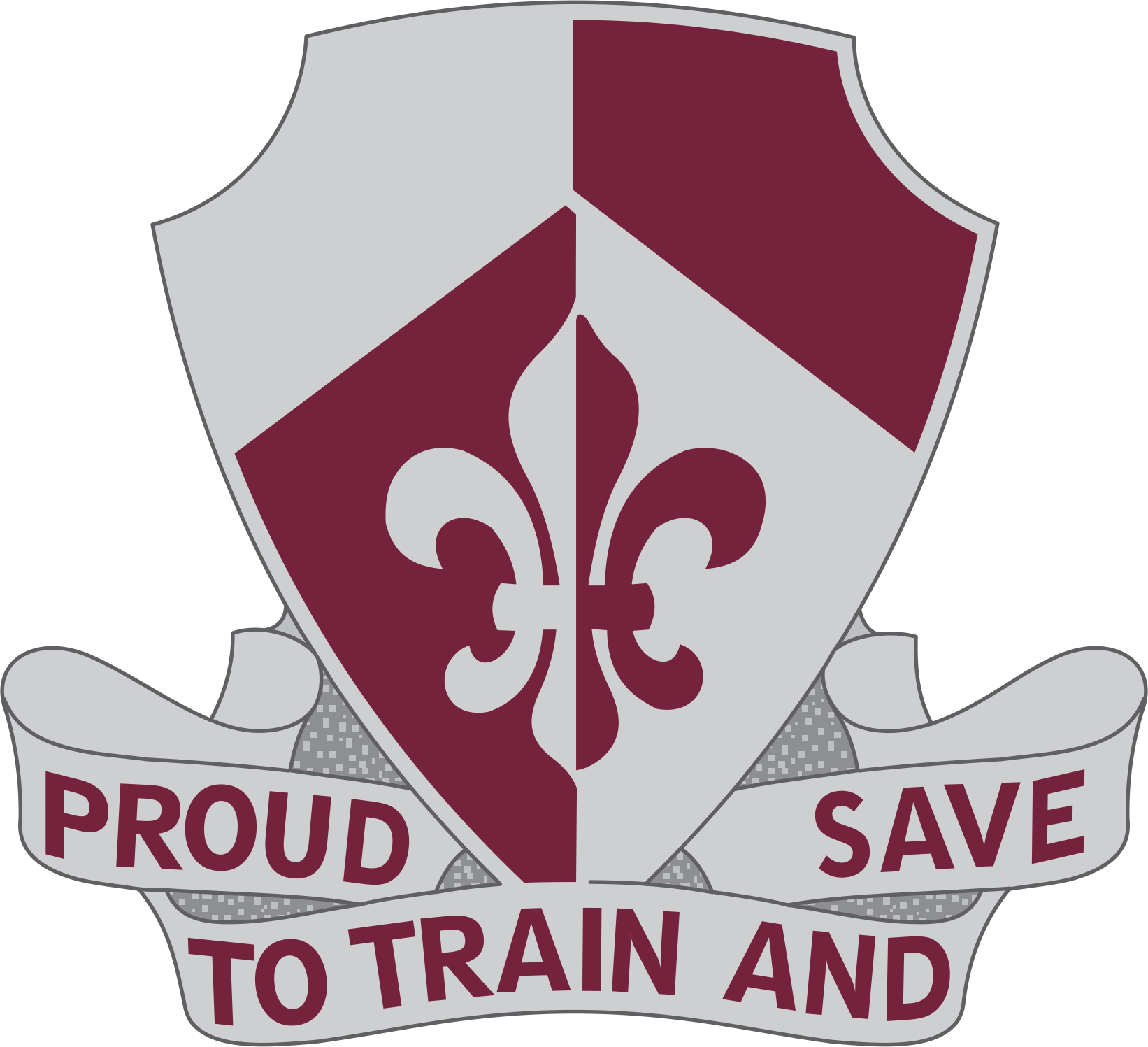
261st Medical Battalion Distinctive Unit Insignia

Description/Blazon: A Silver color metal and enamel device 1 1/8 inches (2.9 cm) in width overall consisting of a shield blazoned: Per pale and per chevron Argent and Sanguine, a fleur-de-lis counterchanged. Attached below the shield, a tripartite Silver scroll inscribed "PROUD TO TRAIN AND SAVE" in Maroon letters.

Symbolism: Maroon and white (Argent) are colors traditionally associated with the Medical Corps. World War II service in France and Italy is represented by the fleur-de-lis and chevron respectively, the last also referring to the assaults in Normandy and suggesting the terrain of Naples and Rome's locales where the unit saw service. The significance of participation in two major landings is denoted by the shield's palewise division and counterchange. The fleur-de-lis further symbolizes the French Croix de Guerre's special honor and the Presidential Unit Citation for action in Normandy.

Background: The distinctive unit insignia was approved on 8 July 1992.

== Coat of arms ==
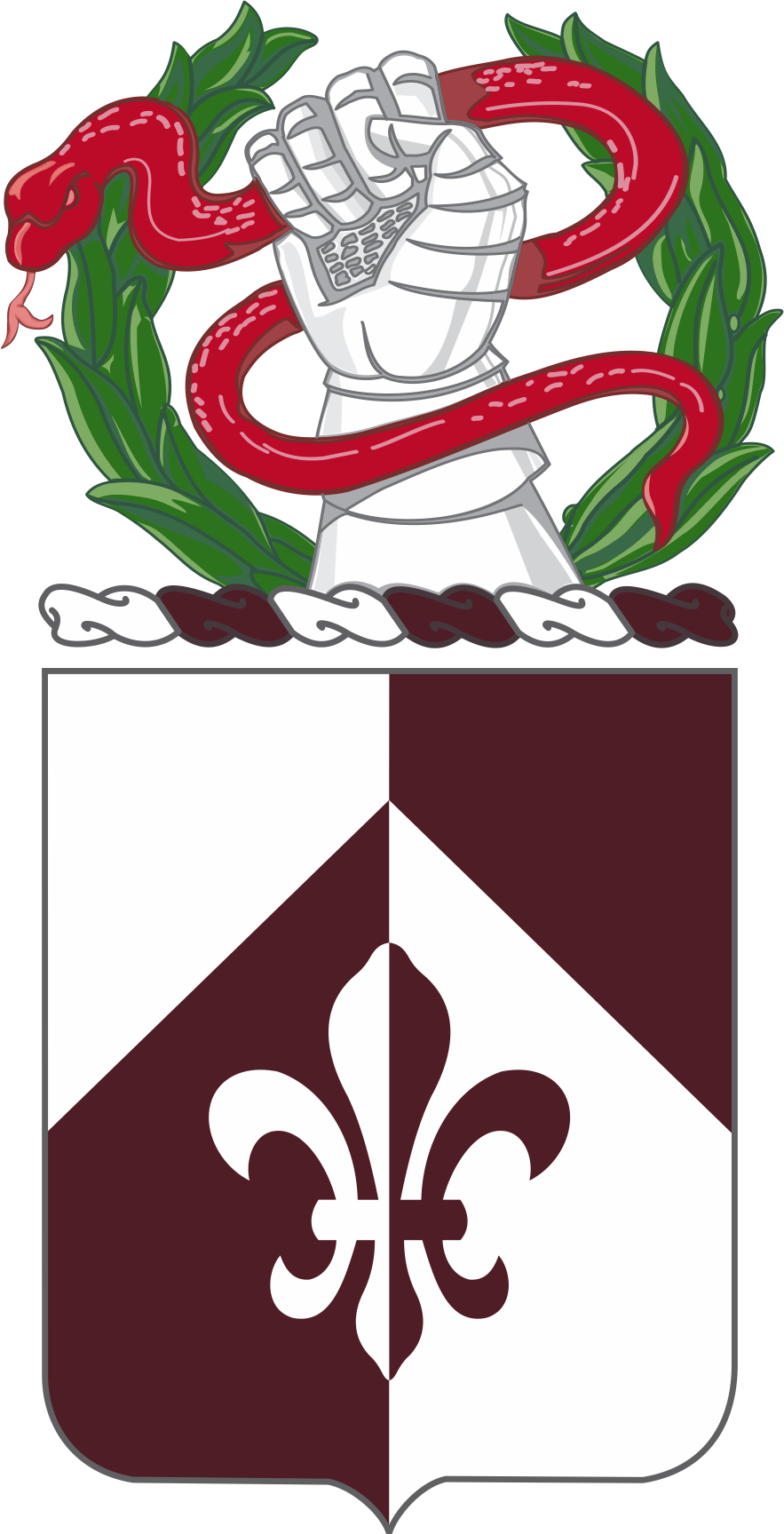
261st Medical Battalion Coat of Arms

Description/Blazon of Shield: Per pale and per chevron Argent and Sanguine, a fleur-de-lis counterchanged.

Crest: From a wreath of the colors, Argent and Sanguine, a wreath of laurel Proper surmounted by an arm in armor, gauntleted; grasping a serpent entwined Gules.

Motto: PROUD TO TRAIN AND SAVE.

Symbolism of Shield: Maroon and white are colors traditionally associated with the Medical Corps. World War II service in France and Italy is represented by the fleur-de-lis and chevron respectively, the last also referring to the assaults in Normandy and suggesting the terrain of Naples and Rome's locales where the unit saw service. The significance of the participation in two major landings is denoted by the palewise division and counterchange of the shield. The fleur-de-lis further symbolizes the French Croix de Guerre's special honor and the Presidential Unit Citation for action in Normandy.

Crest: The colors red, white and green represent Italy. The laurel wreath symbolizes the honors earned by the battalion during World War II service in Europe and the upraised fist signifying victory and the service credits won while fulfilling the mission of medical care to the United States personnel. The serpent, an ancient symbol of medicine, refers to the mission. The arrowed first denotes strength and the resolve to protect military personnel in wartime. Red stands for courage and sacrifice, white for integrity, and green for health.

The coat of arms was approved on 8 July 1992.

== History ==
=== World War II ===
==== Activation and Early Operations ====
The 261st Medical Battalion was activated on 15 June 1942 at Camp Edwards, Massachusetts under the Engineer Amphibian Command. 1LT Howard F. Conn assumed command the same day. On 30 June 1942, Captain Edward L. Tucker was transferred from the 54th Medical Battalion and assumed command per General Order 1, 261st Medical Battalion, replacing 1LT Conn. On 4 July, a cadre of 219 enlisted men were transferred from the 54th Medical Battalion, with Company A of the 54th Medical Battalion forming Company A of the 261st; Company C of the 54th forming Company B of the 261st, and Company D of the 54th forming Company C of the 261st. Staff for the battalion Headquarters Detachment were drawn from the newly formed companies. This was a transfer of personnel and equipment to cadre the new battalion, and there is no linkage between the lineage of the two battalions. Major Earle E. Smith was transferred from Headquarters, Engineering Amphibious Command and assumed command of the battalion on 17 July 1942. He would remain in command until November 1944 when, as a Lieutenant Colonel, he would be transferred to the Headquarters of the Utah District, Normandy Base Section, and Major Daniel I Dann assumed Command, remaining in command until the battalion was disbanded on 28 January 1945.

A month after the original cadre arrived, the battalion left for the port of embarkation, New York. On 6 August they sailed for the British Isles. The majority of their soldiers had been in the Army less than six months, and the majority of their officers on active duty less than one month. There were many changes during the early days at Carrickfergus, Northern Ireland. Because the battalion's equipment did not reach them in time, they were unable to make the North African landing with the 1st Engineer Amphibian Brigade. In early December the battalion moved to a staging area at Birkenhead, England. On 8 January 1943, they sailed for North Africa, and located at Arzew, Algeria. Upon arrival in Algeria, the three medical companies rotated among the three most important activities.

1. The battalion had assigned and borrowed a total of 72 ambulances. The battalion ran an ambulance service to the various US Army Hospitals for patients arriving at La Senia Airport, Oran, from the Tunisian Front, and also carrying patients from hospitals to the Port of Oran for embarkation.

2. The battalion operated a Clearing Station Hospital in Arzew with a capacity of 100 patients. They rendered dispensary and dental care to units in the environs on an area support basis.

3. The battalion trained at the Fifth Army Training Center at Port Aux Poules. Invasion exercises and tactics were stressed.

==== Sicily and Italy ====
On 11 July 1943, the majority of the battalion's men and equipment landed at Gela, Sicily, to handle the casualties and evacuation of the 1st Engineer Special Brigade Beachhead, over which the 1st Infantry Division had made the assault landing. The casualties were relatively heavy in this particular sector. However, the presence of the 1st Medical Battalion's Clearing Company, the 51st Provisional Collecting-Clearing Company (composed of a clearing platoon from a clearing company and a collecting platoon from a collecting company), and the 2nd Armored Division Medical units in addition to the 261st provided adequate care. Following the beachhead phase the three companies ran small hospitals, each holding up to 150 patients. They were located at Agrigento, Gela, and Licata. On 19 August the battalion was alerted for an immediate move to Bizerte for assignment to Fifth Army for what was later discovered to be the landing at Salerno, Italy, on 9 September. The order was cancelled two days later and the battalion remained in Sicily in bivouac. Up until the time of the alert the three companies admitted 3961 patients constituting a total of 9201 patient-days of treatment. During this period the Headquarters Detachment maintained a continual trucking service, first carrying supplies to the front line companies, and later transporting medical supplies from Licata to Palermo, Sicily.

On 19 October 1943, the battalion sailed for Italy and on 24 October set up bivouac at Caserta. Except for some dispensary and evacuation work the battalion saw minimal activity. After turning in most of the battalion's equipment they sailed for Naples on 18 November and proceeded to the British Isles. There, the battalion was garrisoned at Truro, Cornwall, England, on 12 December 1943. From this time until the Normandy Invasion on 6 June 1944, the battalion devoted their efforts to organizing, planning and training for the coming invasion of France.

==== Normandy and Beyond ====
All the training and experience acquired by the 261st Medical Battalion in its operations prepared it for its most important mission, the handling of casualties and evacuation on Utah Beach, Normandy, France.

On 12 April 1944, Companies A and B took part in a special problem called "Splint". It was run off in conjunction with the medical group of the 2nd Naval Beach Battalion and the 531st Engineer Shore Regiment, 1st Engineer Special Brigade. The exercise was supervised by Colonel James L. Snyder, MC, Executive Office to the Surgeon, First United States Army. This maneuver was considered very important by the Allied High Command with regard to the evacuation of casualties on the coming invasion. 200 troops were used as simulated casualties. All phases of casualty handling from the time of admission to the reception of patients aboard ships were demonstrated. The problem was run before a large delegation of ranking officers of both the United States and British Armies and Navies. The results clearly demonstrated that large numbers of casualties could be evacuated off a beach without disturbance to the other functions of the beach. The 261st's companies gained more practical value from this exercise than any other because they had available a large number of men to use as simulated casualties. Most previous exercises had only given them experience in movement of men and equipment and the setting up of a bivouac and collecting station.

The 1st Engineer Special Brigade established the beach in conjunction with the 4th Infantry Division which made the initial assault landings on Utah Beach, and the 82nd and 101st Airborne Divisions whose parachute and glider-borne troops would land beyond the inundated area guarding the beach on the night before D-day. The 1st Engineer Special Brigade and their attached Naval Shore groups developed this beach for the reception of troops, equipment and vehicles and for the evacuation of casualties. Companies A and C, 261st Medical Battalion, landed on H plus 6 hours, on D-day and Company B landed on D+1 and set up next to Company C, which it relieved for 24 hours. By 1800 hours on D-day major surgery was being done by the 261st's medical officers and attached surgical teams. Working with the 4th Division medical units and those of the Engineer and Naval Shore groups the 261st handled all the casualties on Utah Beach. All patients were cleared through the 261st Medical Battalion. Working with the 2nd Naval Beach Battalion Medical Section the battalion handled all evacuation to the United Kingdom. As there was no air evacuation on this beach in the early phase and very little even much later the battalion evacuated almost all the patients in the chain of evacuation scheme. All definitive surgery was performed at the 261st's companies until D+5. After that the Field and Evacuation Hospitals gradually relieved the battalion of that task. After the first two weeks the battalion was performing only the overflow surgery; cases that occurred in the immediate vicinity of the battalion's companies, or cases that became unstable during evacuation. At this stage the battalion's primary responsibilities were holding and evacuation.

Evacuation was accomplished chiefly by jeep ambulances augmented by DUKWs and trucks. Patients were sent primarily to LSTs and also to Hospital Ships via LCTs and DUKWs. The former method is the fastest and also the easiest on the patient as the journey to the Hospital Ship involves moving the patient twice. First of all they are placed on the vehicles, then the LCTs, and then after a rough ride out to the Carrier they are hauled aboard. Or they are loaded on DUKWs at the Clearing Station and proceed directly to the Hospital Carrier. Where a long journey by boat is contemplated the Hospital Ship will assure a more comfortable ride. The battalion was able to schedule evacuation as required except for a two-day period, 20–22 June, when a storm at sea prevented the movement of casualties to ships. On 21 June the battalion had 691 patients remaining at their three companies. However, the following day the storm subsided, the battalion was able to evacuate 515 patients, and the emergency was over. Though carrying on the important function of evacuation until the beach closed, the 261st was most valuable in the first four weeks of the operation – and especially during the first week. An analysis of the number of patients admitted and evacuated will illustrate this point:

Date	Number Admitted (Cumulative)	Number Evacuated (Cumulative)
13 June 1944	7,245	6,533
20 June 1944	11,521	10,461
27 June 1944	13,814	12,670
6 August 1944	34,877	32,477
31 December 1944	42,551	36,045

The data demonstrates that for the first week the battalion averaged 1035 admissions each day. Then the rate fell and the average daily admission rate for the first two months was 571.6 patients. After that the rate became much lower – the breakthrough at St. Lo occurred on 25 July 1944, and the front moved in all directions requiring new evacuation points, accounting for the drop in patient load in the 261st's treatment facilities.

The battalion headquarters detachment landed on D+1 and immediately started to run the medical supply dump for the beach. It also accomplished was the important job of handling the medical records and reports for the battalion, as well as consolidating records for the 1st Engineer Special Brigade, which numbered over 17,000 troops. In August the 261st Medical Battalion was assigned by the Surgeon Normandy Base Section, COMMZ, to stage all hospital units and all female personnel arriving over Utah and Omaha Beaches from the United States and United Kingdom. The following were staged:

32 General Hospitals

5 Station Hospitals

1 Evacuation Hospital

11 Field Hospitals

2 Auxiliary Surgical Groups

2 Ambulance Companies

Miscellaneous groups from female organizations such as the Auxiliary Territorial Service, Women's Army Corps, American Red Cross, etc.

Throughout the battalion's stay on the beach their trucks were handling supplies for the 1st Engineer Special Brigade. Later on they hauled supplies from the Depot at Omaha Beach to Paris for the Surgeon, Normandy Base Section. Starting in August some of the battalion's Jeeps were commandeered by the Surgeon, Communications Zone, and they were stationed in Cherbourg, Paris and Rennes.

As the beach slowed down our Company A moved a short distance inland, near Ste Marie Du Mont and the battalion headquarters. They set up a Clearing Station Hospital and handled principally troops of the 1st Engineer Special Brigade. During the last week of August they were joined by Company C. At this time Company B started to handle only the POW patients from the nearby stockades, and this policy continued throughout the remainder of 1944. On 11 September 1944, Company B joined the remainder of the battalion. This arrangement lasted through November. On 11 December 1944, Headquarters and Company B moved to Ste Mere Eglise, and were followed shortly by Company A. The latter ran a dispensary at Ste Mere Eglise and dispatched personnel to their 1st Platoon at Valognes to augment the 61st Medical Battalion Clearing Station that was running a 200-bed hospital. Company C moved to Granville during the last week of December. They took over the dispensary care for the surrounding area and also handled quarters cases. This was the battalion's status at the end of 1944.

==== Inactivation ====
In January 1945, the 261st was transferred out of the Normandy Base Section to the Channel Base Section, France. On 18 January 1945, the move took place, and the battalion was arrayed as follows:

Headquarters and Headquarters Detachment was located at Feeamp, where it was performing its usual command and control and administrative duties, Battalion Motor and Supply functions.

Company A was located at Le Havre, where it was running a 200-bed hospital in buildings.

Company B was located at Camp Lucky Strike, near Cany Barville, where it was running a 150-bed tent hospital primarily handling transient troops whose hospitalization period would not exceed seven days and running a large dispensary service and "clearing" all patients from the camp.

Company C was located at Camp Twenty Grand near Duclair, where it was running a 120-bed tent hospital primarily handling transient troops whose hospitalization period would not exceed seven days and running a large dispensary service and "clearing" all patients from the camp.

On 28 January 1945, the 261st Medical Battalion was disbanded and its personnel and equipment were used to form the 98th Medical Battalion (Separate), which consisted of:

Headquarters & Headquarters Detachment, 98th Medical Battalion.

761st Medical Company (Collecting)

762nd Medical Company (Collecting)

763rd Medical Company (Clearing)

764th Medical Company (Ambulance)

Because the 261st Medical Battalion was Disbanded, there is no connection between the lineage and honors of the 261st Medical Battalion and the organizations that received personnel and equipment from the 261st.

Some relevant facts from the 261st Medical Battalion's one historical report from World War II:

The battalion existed for 31 months.

There was about a 25% change in personnel from the time it was organized until it disbanded.

75% of its members served 30 months overseas and participated in four campaigns.

Number of deaths in action: 5.

Number of missing in action: 0.

Number of wounded in action: 17.

Number of decorations:

Legion of Merit: 2

Bronze Star Medal: 21.

Purple Heart: 17.

==== Citation to accompany the Presidential Unit Citation, Streamer embroidered NORMANDY ====
GENERAL ORDERS NO. 57 WAR DEPARTMENT Washington: 25, D. C., 16 July 1945.

"The 261st Medical Battalion is cited for courageous performance of duty under exceptionally difficult and hazardous conditions during the period from 6 June 1944 to 18 July 1944; Landing on the coast of Normandy, France, in close support of assault troops on, D-day, in the face of intense artillery fire, this unit, within sight of enemy forces, set up its tentage and commenced to collect and evacuate the wounded. By H plus 8 hours, clearing stations were established and major surgery was being performed. With unwavering determination, this unit handled over 75% of all casualties sustained on First Army beaches during the first 10 days of the Normandy invasion. To shoulder this tremendous burden, the officers and men of the 261st Medical Battalion worked day and night with no sleep what so ever under enemy artillery fire and air raids. Undaunted by flak which constantly pierced the operating tents; our personnel continued-working in utter disregard for their personal safety in order more speedily to render medical aid to the wounded. From the first critical and uncertain hours on 6 June through 18 July 1944, this unit cared for thousands of casualties, including every single patient evacuated to the United Kingdom from the Cherbourg sector. The valorous and. unfaltering devotion to duty and individual gallantry of the members of the 261st Medical Battalion contributed immeasurably to the successful liberation of Europe and are in keeping with the highest traditions of the armed forces of the United States.

General Orders 94, Headquarters European Theater of operations, 15 May 1945, as approved by Commanding' General European Theater of operations"

=== Current ===
The battalion was reconstituted in the regular Army on 1 October 1991 as the 261st Medical Battalion (Area Support). It was activated on 16 September 1992 at Fort Bragg, North Carolina and assigned to the 44th Medical Brigade. The battalion consisted of a Headquarters and Support Company and three-lettered Area Support Medical Companies in its original configuration. The battalion drew upon the 36th Medical Company (Clearing) and the 429th Medical Company (Ambulance), which were concurrently inactivated, for personnel and equipment to resource the battalion, which included paid parachutist positions to allow the battalion to support the XVIII Airborne Corps's forced entry mission. Immediately upon activation, the battalion deployed two companies in support of Disaster Relief Operations in Florida from September through November 1992 in the wake of Hurricane Andrew.

During the period 1 October 1992 through 21 April 2000, the 261st Area Support Medical Battalion was a subordinate unit of the 55th Medical Group, which had been activated as an intermediate level headquarters under the 44th Medical Brigade when the 44th converted to a general officer command. When the 55th Medical Group inactivated, the 261st Medical Battalion again became a direct reporting unit to the brigade headquarters.

Over time, the Area Medical Battalion concept demonstrated that the idea of a fixed battalion structure with maintenance and other assets centralized in the Headquarters and Support Company limited the Army's ability to deploy individual Area Support Medical Companies effectively. The Area Support Medical Battalions were restructured into a separate battalion Headquarters and Headquarters Detachment and individual, numbered Area Support Medical Companies. The 261st Area Support Medical Battalion converted to this new structure on 16 August 2002, when the Headquarters and Support Company was redesignated as the Headquarters and Headquarters Detachment, 261st Medical Battalion, and the other organic elements of the battalion (the lettered companies) were inactivated, and their personnel and equipment were used to resource the 36th, 550th, 601st and 602nd Area Support Medical Companies, which were concurrently activated.

Following the mid-2000s reorganization of Army Aviation, which placed Army Air Ambulance Companies within General Support Aviation Battalions instead of under Medical Evacuation Battalions controlled by the Army Medical Department, the need for separate Evacuation Battalions, Area Medical Support Battalions, Logistics Battalions, and other specialized medical command and control headquarters were reassessed. The resultant command and control structure at the battalion level was the Medical Battalion (Multifunctional), with a more robust clinical operations cell and a standard battalion staff. As part of the overall force structure conversion, the 261st Medical Battalion converted from an Area Support Medical Battalion to a Multifunctional Medical Battalion in May 2005.

Units of the 261st Multi-Functional Medical Battalion:

- Headquarters and Headquarters Detachment, 261st Medical Battalion, Fort Bragg
- 36th Medical Company (Area Support), Fort Bragg
- 51st Medical Company (Logistics), Fort Bragg
- 550th Medical Company (Area Support), Fort Bragg
- 601st Medical Company (Area Support), Fort Bragg
- 602nd Medical Company (Area Support), Fort Bragg
- 690th Medical Company (Ambulance), Fort Bragg
- 24th Medical Detachment (Optical Fabrication), Fort Bragg
- 155 Medical Detachment (Preventive Medicine), Fort Bragg
- 172nd Medical Detachment (Preventive Medicine), Fort Bragg
