= Norman T. Kirk =

United States Army general

Norman Thomas Kirk
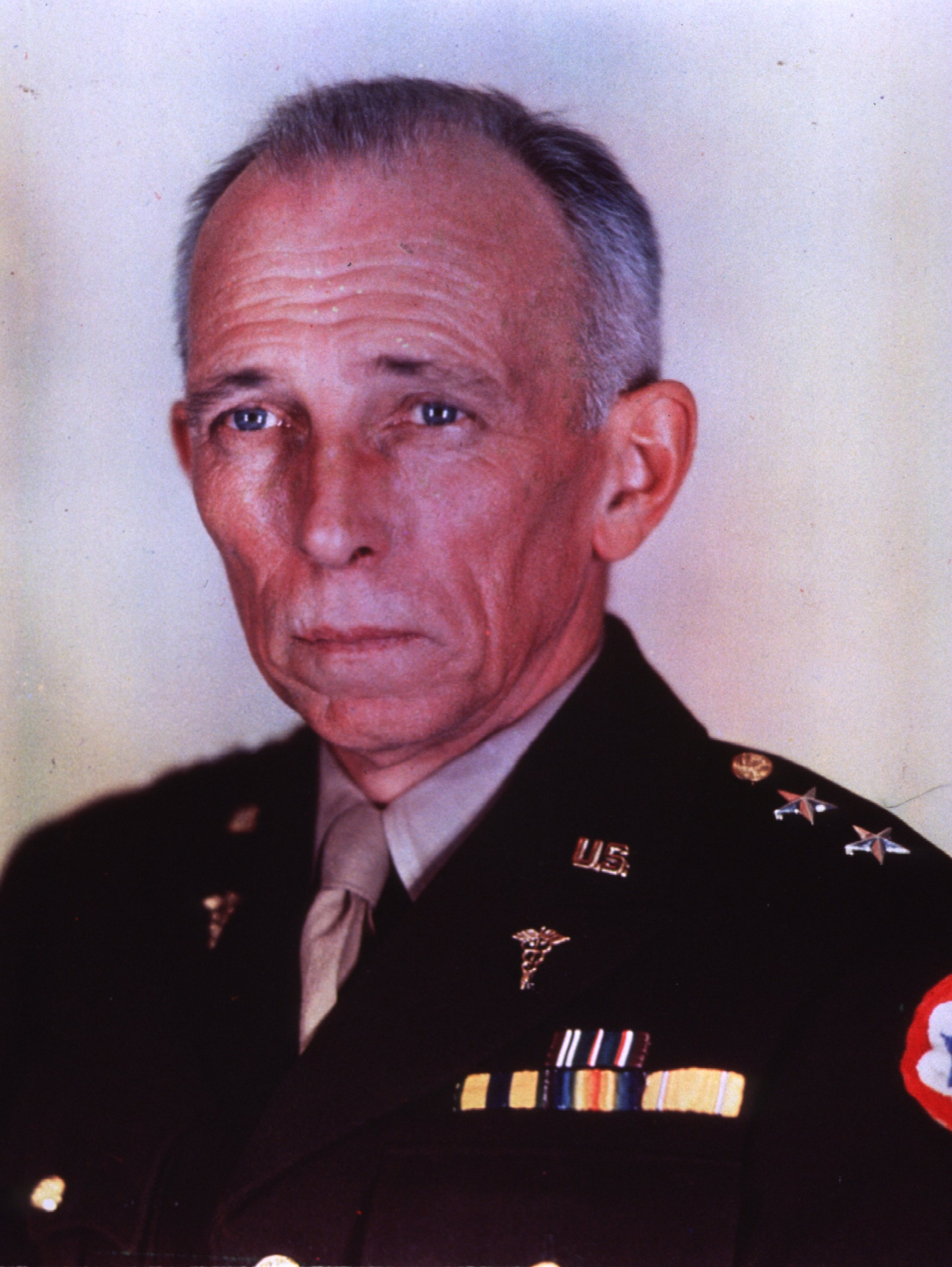
- Born: January 3, 1888; Rising Sun, Maryland
- Died: August 13, 1960 (age 72); Washington DC
- Education: University of Maryland (1910), Army Medical School (1913)
- Title: Surgeon General of the United States Army
- Term: 1943–1947
- Predecessor: James C. Magee
- Spouse: Anne Duryea
- Children: 2

Norman Thomas Kirk (January 3, 1888 – August 13, 1960) was a surgeon who specialized in bone and joint surgery during World War 1 and was Surgeon General of the Army from 1943 to 1947 during the height of the second World War.

== Biography ==
Norman Thomas Kirk was born on January 3, 1888, in Rising Sun, Maryland, to Thomas Kirk and Anna Brown.

Kirk attended Jacob Tome School and graduated in 1906. He then attended the University of Maryland. While in school he worked as a druggist during school breaks. He received his medical doctorate degree in 1910. He then worked as the resident physician at the University Hospital in Baltimore.

In 1910, Kirk began working as a clinical assistant at the United States Soldiers' Home Hospital, Washington, D.C. Kirk enlisted in the Army Medical Reserve Corp on May 29, 1912, and was commissioned as a first lieutenant. He graduated from the Army Medical school in 1913 and was stationed in Texas City Texas. He was then moved out of the reserve and into the active Army medical corp.

=== World War 1 ===
During 1914 he worked at a Field Hospital in Vera Cruz, Mexico during an expedition against the forces of President Victoriano Huerta of Mexico.

Between 1915 and 1916 he worked in the Panama Canal Zone at Fort Grant and Fort Sherman. He was then transferred to the base hospital in Brownsville Texas in July 1917. He was transferred again in 1917 to the Medical Officers' Training Camp at Camp Greenleaf in Georgia. He worked there as a medical instructor until 1919. On September 21, 1917, he married Anne Duryea, a nurse.

In January 1919, he was transferred to work at Walter Reed Hospital and General Hospital No. 3 to treat returning wounded soldiers. While there he changed from practicing general surgery to specializing in bone and joint surgery and amputations. In the spring of 1919 the two hospitals treated over 1,300 patient with major limb loss. Of those he operated on 700 patients. He worked to preserve as much of a residual limb as possible for better prosthetic functioning for the patients. Contrary to common practice Kirk worked to observe his patients for several months following the operation to study wound healing patient outcome. By the end of the war, Kirk had become one of the United States leading experts on amputations.

=== Post war period ===
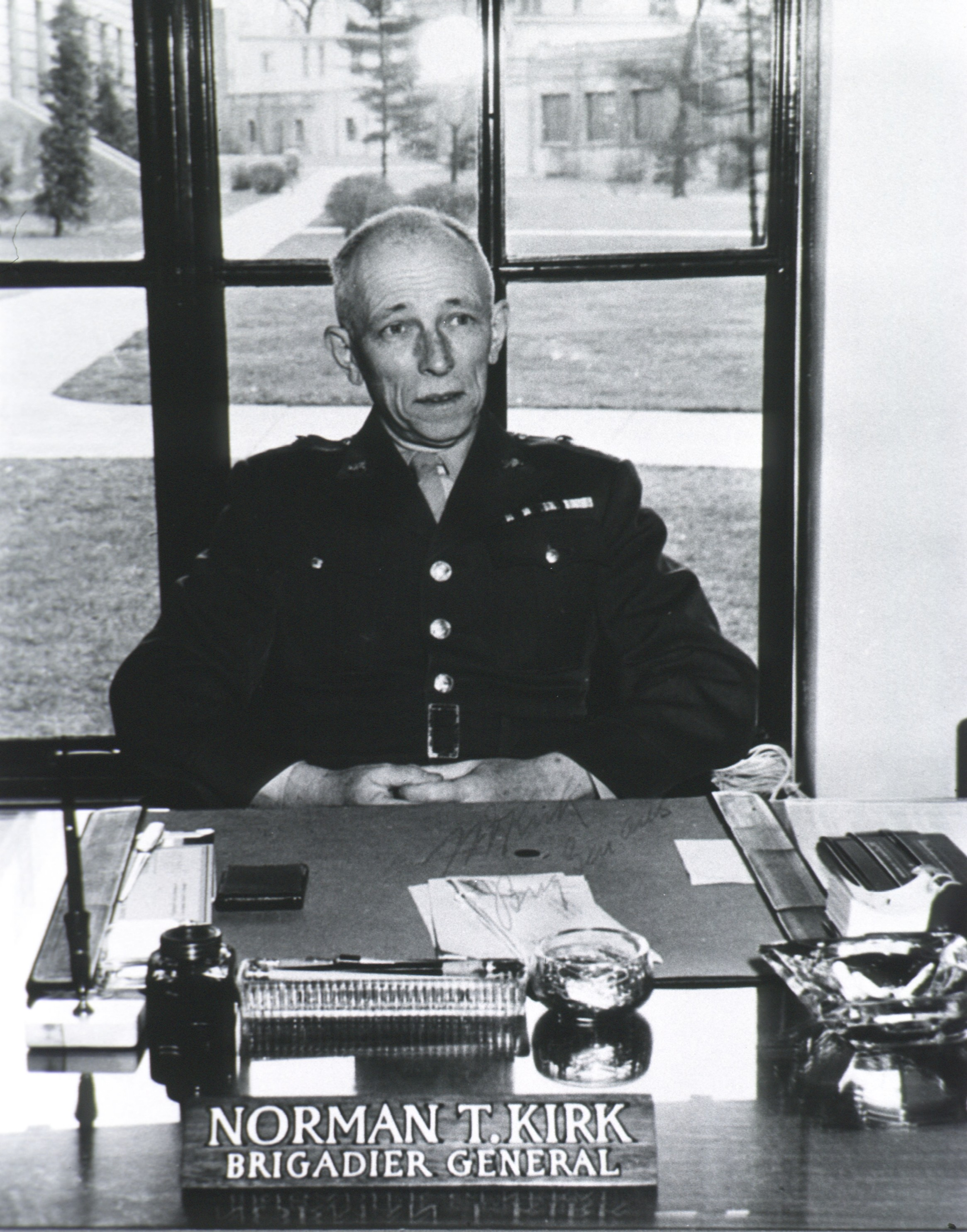
Kirk before appointment

After the war he studied briefly at Johns Hopkins University hospital before being transferred to Brooke Army Medical Center in 1925. By July 1927 he became Chief of Surgical Service. In February 1928, he was transferred as the chief of surgical service to Sternberg General Hospital in Manila.

In July 1930, Kirk returned to Washington, D.C., and was assigned to the Walter Reed General Hospital at the Army Medical Center. He worked there as the chief of the orthopedic ward. He returned to the Philippines in 1934 and worked as chief of the Surgical Service. In 1936 moved back to the United States and worked at Letterman General Hospital as their chief of the Surgical Service.

In 1938, he became board certified in orthopedic surgery becoming the first US Army surgeon to be certified. In January 1941, Kirk took the position as Chief of Surgical Service at Walter Reed General Hospital in Washington DC.

With World War II imminent, General Kirk worked in the Surgeon General's Office to update the medical department supply catalog to ensure it would include the proper items for the treatment of the battle wounded.

Kirk was made the Commanding Officer of Percy Jones General Hospital in Battle Creek, Michigan in June 1942, which he converted into an Army hospital from the Battle Creek Sanitarium. The facility specialized in amputations and neurosurgery and became one of five designated US Army amputee treatment centers.

On March 12, 1943, Kirk was promoted to the rank of brigadier general.

=== Surgeon General of the United States Army ===
In 1943, General George Marshal appointed him Surgeon General of the United States Army to replace James C. Magee. After appointment, he was promoted to Major General. Kirk worked to create uniform protocols for treating patients with amputations to improve care for soldiers. The improvements in wound treatment reduced the mortality rate of injured soldiers to half of the level seen during World War 1. He received the distinguished service medal in May 1945.

In 1946, he proposed the establishment of a permanent Medical Service Corp in the Medical Department of the regular army.

He retired from his position as surgeon general at the end of his four-year term on July 31, 1947.

=== Retirement ===
After retirement from the army, he became a governor of the American College of Surgeons and also worked on the American Board of Surgery.

He died in Washington, D. C. at Walter Reed General Hospital on August 13, 1960.
