= Mary K. Izaguirre =

U.S. Army general

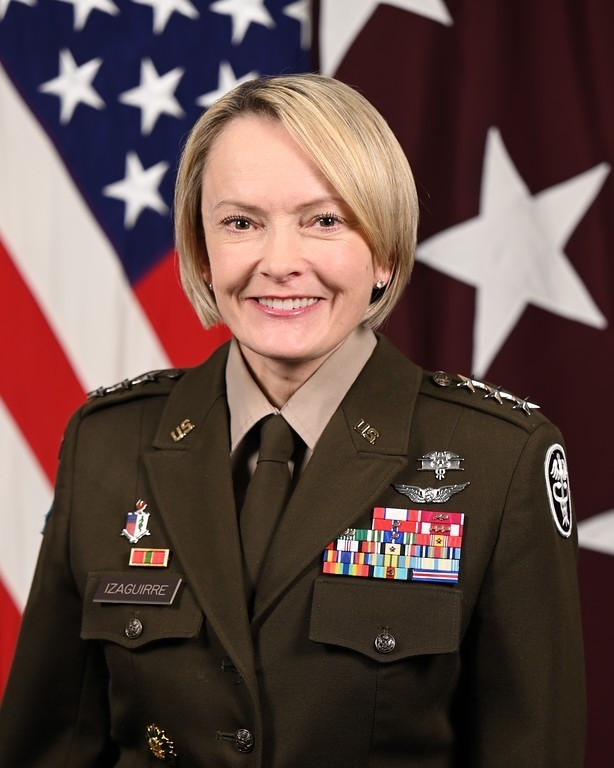
- Official portrait, 2024
- Born: Mary Virginia Biglow
- Alma mater: Philadelphia College of Osteopathic Medicine
- Spouse: Joseph Izaguirre
- Children: 5
- Military career
- Allegiance: United States
- Branch: United States Army
- Service years: 1995–present
- Rank: Lieutenant General
- Commands: Surgeon General of the United States Army; United States Army Medical Command; Medical Readiness Command East; Regional Health Command Atlantic
- Awards: Distinguished Service Medal; Legion of Merit (3); Bronze Star Medal (2)

Mary Krueger Izaguirre is a United States Army lieutenant general and physician who serves as the surgeon general of the United States Army. She previously served as the commanding general of Medical Readiness Command East and chief of the United States Army Medical Corps.

In September 2023, Izaguirre was nominated for promotion to lieutenant general and appointment as surgeon general of the United States Army, commanding general of the United States Army Medical Command, and chief of the Army Medical Department. She was confirmed by the Senate on 5 December 2023. In June 2023, Izaguirre had been nominated for promotion to major general, and was promoted to that rank with an effective date of rank of 5 December 2023, the date of her Senate confirmation.

On 25 January 2024, Izaguirre replaced R. Scott Dingle as surgeon general of the United States Army, and commanding general of the United States Army Medical Command in a ceremony at Fort Sam Houston, Texas.

Military offices
Preceded by Paula Lodi	Commanding General of Regional Health Command Atlantic; 2021–2022	Command redesignated
New office	Commanding General of Medical Readiness Command East and Chief of the United States Army Medical Corps; 2022–2023	Succeeded by Lance C. Raney
Preceded by R. Scott Dingle	Surgeon General of the United States Army and Commanding General of the United States Army Medical Command; 2024–present	Incumbent
