= Hal B. Jennings =

US Army surgeon general (1915–2008)

Hal Bruce Jennings, Jr.
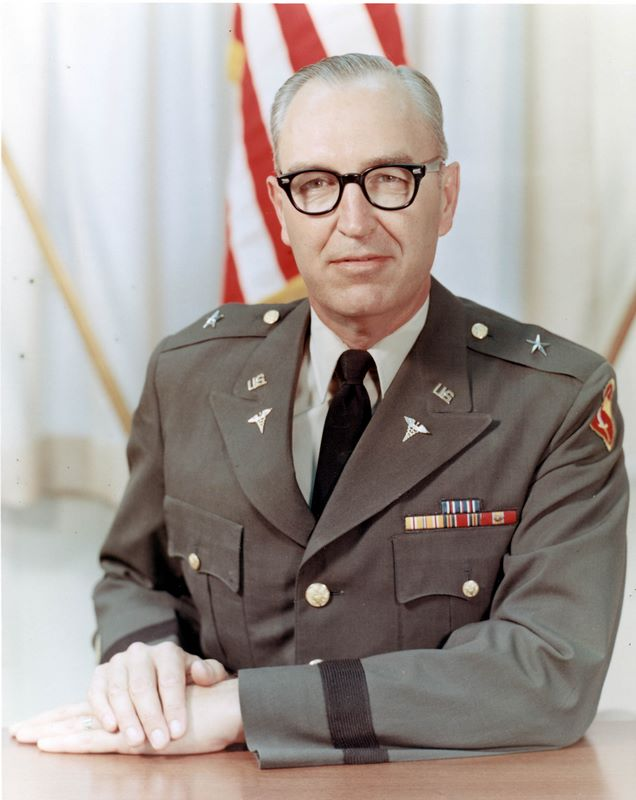
- Born: August 26, 1915; Seneca, Michigan
- Died: February 12, 2008 (aged 92); San Antonio, Texas
- Military career
- Allegiance: United States of America
- Branch: United States Army
- Service years: 1942–1975
- Rank: Lieutenant General
- Commands: Surgeon General of the US Army; 44th Medical Brigade
- Conflicts: World War II; Vietnam War
- Awards: Distinguished Service Medal; Legion of Merit; Air Medal

Hal Bruce Jennings Jr. (August 26, 1915 – February 12, 2008) was an American plastic surgeon who served as Surgeon General of the United States Army from October 10, 1969, to September 30, 1973.

== Education ==
Jennings was born in Seneca, Michigan and attended schools in Toledo, Ohio, graduating from DeVilbiss High School in 1933. He studied at the University of Toledo, where he undertook a pre-medical course and graduated with a B.S. degree in 1937. He then attended the University of Michigan Medical School at Ann Arbor, Michigan. Jennings graduated in June 1941 with a Doctor of Medicine degree and accepted a commission as a 1st lieutenant in the Medical Corps Reserve, but remained at the university to complete a one-year internship. On July 1, 1942, he was called to active duty and attended a one-month refresher course at the Medical Field Service School, Carlisle Barracks, Pennsylvania. He then served for over a year in the Medical Training Center at Camp Joseph T. Robinson, Arkansas, and as a regimental surgeon in an engineer training unit at Camp Claiborne, Louisiana. He was promoted to temporary captain on February 5, 1943, and was sent overseas in the fall.

== Career ==
Jennings served in the Pacific Theater of Operations with the 25th Evacuation Hospital at Espiritu Santo, New Hebrides, the 8th General Hospital, New Caledonia, and the Joint Purchasing Board, Auckland, New Zealand. On December 11, 1944, he was commissioned as 1st lieutenant in the Regular Army Medical Corps and promoted to permanent captain on July 7, 1945.

Jennings returned to the United States in May 1946. In August, he was assigned to McCornack General Hospital in Pasadena, California to work in plastic and reconstructive surgery on casualties of World War II. He was promoted to temporary major on October 30, 1946. In early 1948, he moved with the last of his plastic surgery patients to Letterman General Hospital in San Francisco. While at Letterman, Jennings completed a residency in general surgery. He was accepted for further plastic surgery training at the Barnes Hospital of the Washington University School of Medicine in St. Louis, Missouri, and began two years training with the Blair Brown Group of Surgeons on July 1, 1949. He was promoted to permanent major on February 3, 1950, and to temporary lieutenant colonel on December 9, while he was in St. Louis.

In July 1951, Jennings reported to Brooke Army General Hospital, Fort Sam Houston, Texas, as assistant chief of plastic surgery to assist in caring for Korean War casualties. While on this assignment, he was certified in 1953 as a diplomate of the American Board of Plastic Surgery. On August 1, 1956, he was promoted to permanent lieutenant colonel and concurrently assigned to Walter Reed Army General Hospital, Washington, D.C. He served as the chief of the plastic surgery service and as consultant to the surgeon general on plastic surgery. He was promoted to temporary colonel on August 10, 1959.

From July 1961 Jennings served in Germany as a staff surgeon, V Corps, in Frankfurt for a year and as commander of the 130th Station Hospital in Heidelberg starting in August 1962. He was promoted to permanent colonel on February 1, 1964. On his return to the United States in August, Colonel Jennings assumed command of Martin Army Hospital, Ft. Benning, Georgia, and concurrently served as post surgeon. In this assignment, he was responsible for the medical support of the 11th Air Assault Division (Test), which subsequently deployed to Vietnam as the 1st Cavalry Division (Air Mobile). He also supervised the medical aspects of the conversion of Ft. Benning from a division-type post to a complete training center, together with the medical care provided casualties from the Vietnam War.

In May 1968, he was assigned as command surgeon to the United States Military Assistance Command, Vietnam. He was promoted to temporary brigadier general on September 1, 1968. On February 1, 1969, he assumed command of the 44th Medical Brigade at Long Binh, with additional duty as surgeon, Headquarters, United States Army, Vietnam. Jennings left Vietnam to be sworn in on July 1, 1969, as deputy surgeon general, and was promoted to permanent brigadier general on August 1. He was sworn in as surgeon general on October 1 and concurrently promoted to temporary lieutenant general.

== Awards and memberships ==
His military awards include the Distinguished Service Medal, the Legion of Merit, the Air Medal, and the Joint Service Commendation Medal. He also holds the Vietnam Army Distinguished Service Order (1st Class) and the Vietnam Public Health Service Medal (1st Class). Jennings is a Fellow of the American College of Surgeons. He held membership in the American Medical Association, the American Society of Plastic and Reconstructive Surgeons, the Texas Society of Plastic Surgeons, the American Association of Plastic Surgeons, the International Congress of Plastic Surgeons, the Foundation of the American Society of Plastic and Reconstructive Surgery, the Association of Military Surgeons of the U.S., the Association of Military Plastic Surgeons, and the Halstead Society (1970).

1st Row	Army Distinguished Service Medal	Legion of Merit	Joint Service Commendation Medal	Air Medal
2nd Row	American Campaign Medal	Asiatic-Pacific Campaign Medal	World War II Victory Medal	National Defense Service Medal w/ Oak Leaf Cluster
3rd Row	Vietnam Service Medal w/ two service stars	Vietnam Distinguished Service Order 1st Class	Armed Forces Honor Medal 1st Class	Vietnam Campaign Medal

Military offices
Preceded by Leonard D. Heaton	Surgeon General of the US Army; 1969–1973	Succeeded by Richard R. Taylor
