= R. Scott Dingle =

US Army general

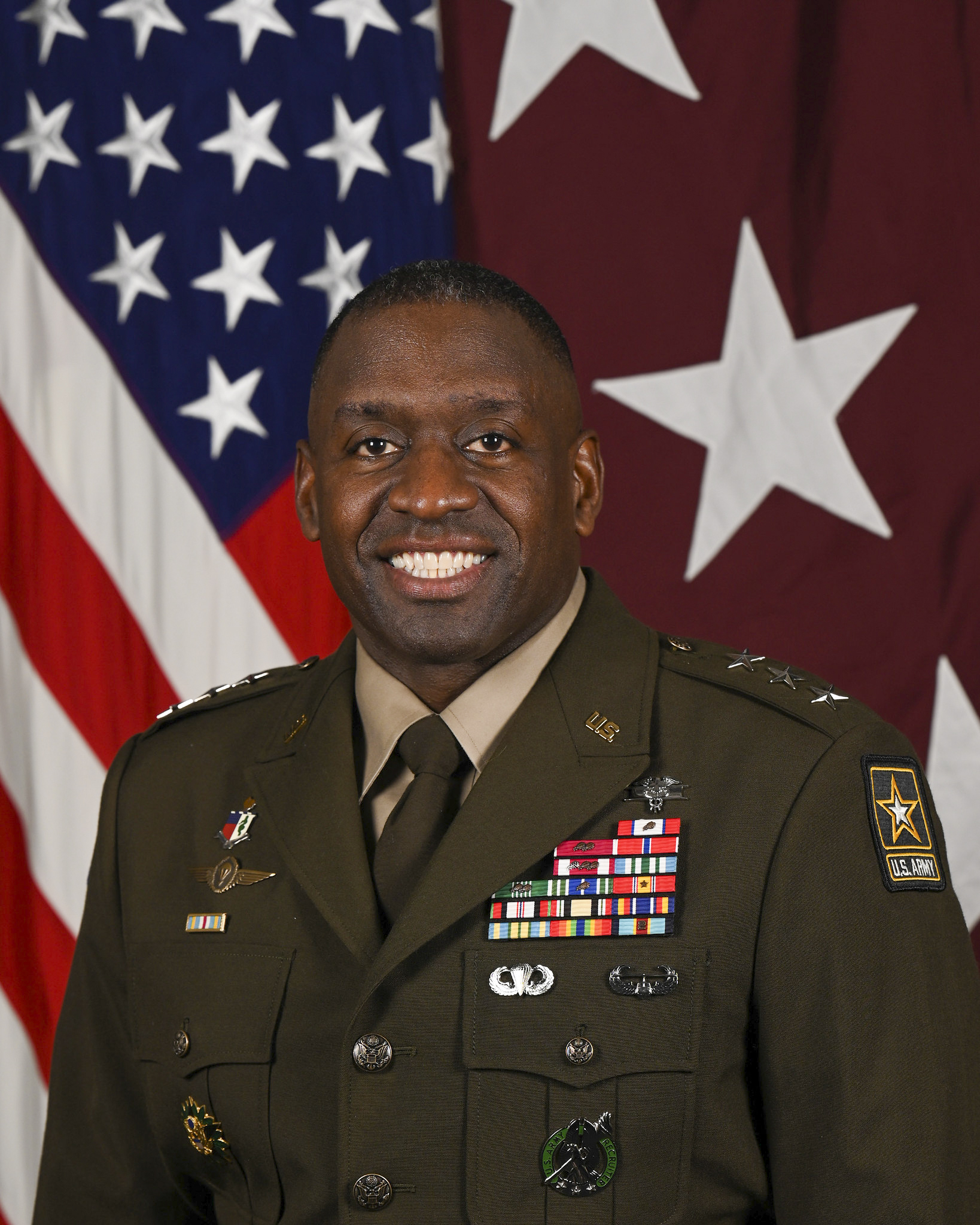
- Military career
- Allegiance: United States
- Branch: United States Army
- Service years: 1988–2024
- Rank: Lieutenant General
- Commands: Surgeon General of the Army; United States Army Medical Command; Regional Health Command—Atlantic; 30th Medical Command; United States Army Medical Recruiting Brigade; 261st Multifunctional Medical Battalion
- Conflicts: War in Afghanistan; Iraq War
- Awards: Army Distinguished Service Medal (2); Legion of Merit (3); Bronze Star Medal
- R. Scott Dingle's voice Dingle's opening statement at a Senate Appropriations Defense Subcommittee hearing on military health programs Recorded March 7, 2023

Raymond Scott Dingle is a retired United States Army lieutenant general who served as the 45th Surgeon General of the United States Army and Commanding General, United States Army Medical Command from 2019 to 2024. Dingle graduated from Morgan State University in 1988 with a Bachelor of Science in Sociology, and has master's degrees in Administration from Central Michigan University, Military Arts and Science from the School of Advanced Military Studies, and in National Security Strategy from the National War College. At the time of his selection, Dingle was serving as Deputy Surgeon General and Deputy Commanding General (Support) of the United States Army Medical Command in Falls Church, Virginia.

Dingle became acting United States Army Surgeon General after the July 19, 2019 retirement of Lieutenant General Nadja West. He was nominated for promotion to lieutenant general and permanent assignment as the United States Army Surgeon General on July 22, 2019, and confirmed by the Senate on September 26, 2019. Dingle was promoted to lieutenant general on October 17, 2019, by the Chief of Staff of the United States Army, General James C. McConville. His retirement ceremony took place on July 31, 2023.

== Awards and recognitions ==
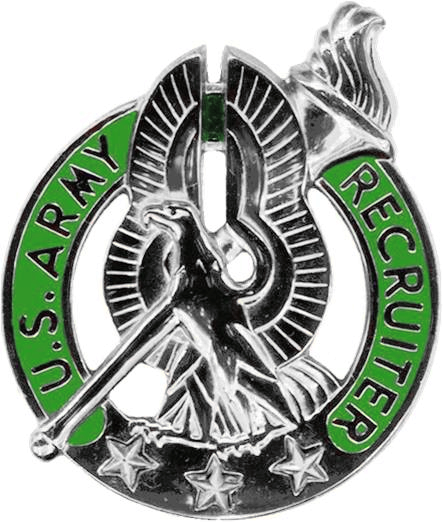
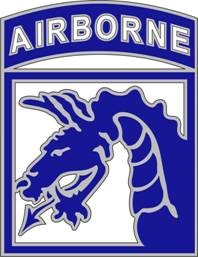
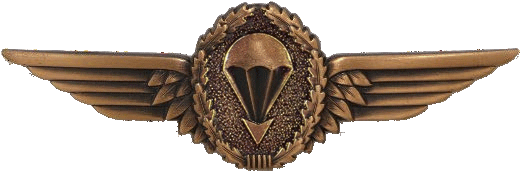
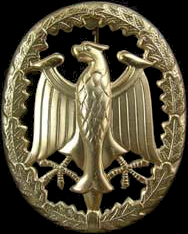
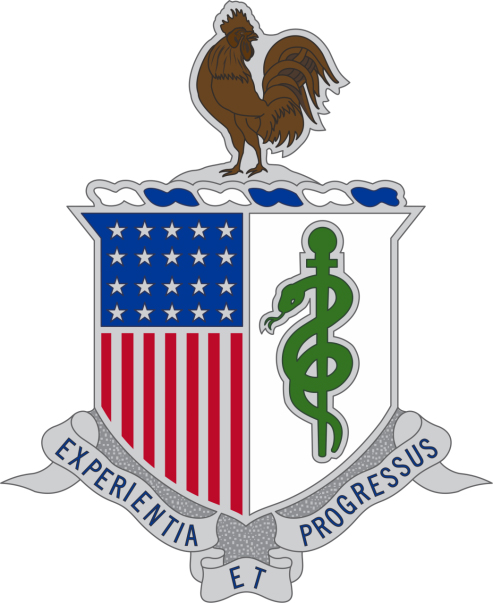
Expert Field Medical Badge
Basic Parachutist Badge
Air Assault Badge
Silver Army Recruiter Badge
Army Staff Identification Badge
XVIII Airborne Corps Combat Service Identification Badge
Bronze German Parachutist Badge
German Armed Forces Badge for Military Proficiency in Gold
Army Medical Department (AMEDD) Distinctive Unit Insignia
3 Overseas Service Bars

Army Distinguished Service Medal with one bronze oak leaf cluster
Legion of Merit with two oak leaf clusters
Bronze Star Medal
Meritorious Service Medal with six oak leaf clusters
Joint Service Commendation Medal
Army Commendation Medal with two oak leaf clusters
Army Achievement Medal with oak leaf cluster
Joint Meritorious Unit Award
National Defense Service Medal with one bronze service star
Afghanistan Campaign Medal with one bronze campaign star
Iraq Campaign Medal with one bronze campaign star
Global War on Terrorism Service Medal
Military Outstanding Volunteer Service Medal
Army Service Ribbon
Army Overseas Service Ribbon with bronze award numeral 3

Military offices
Preceded by Robert Tenhet	Deputy Surgeon General of the United States Army; 2018–2019	Succeeded by Telita Crosland
Preceded by Robert Tenhet	Deputy Commanding General (Support) of the United States Army Medical Command; 2018–2019	Succeeded by Telita Crosland
Preceded by Nadja West	Surgeon General of the United States Army and Commanding General of the United States Army Medical Command; 2019–2024	Succeeded by Mary Krueger
