= Alcide M. Lanoue =

Surgeon General of the US Army (1934–2021)

Alcide M. LaNoue
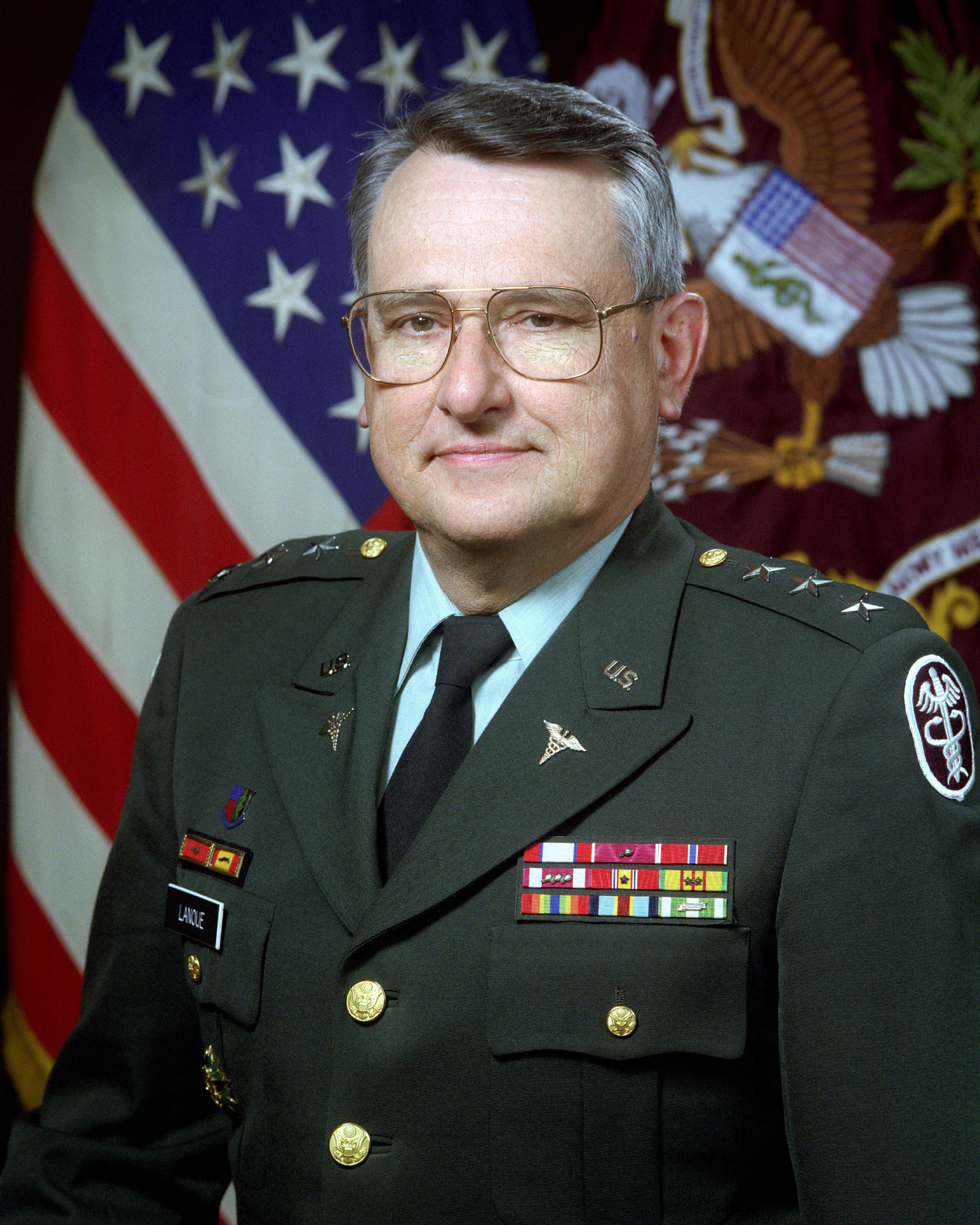
- Born: Alcide Moodie LaNoue; November 2, 1934; Townawanda, New York, U.S.
- Died: February 20, 2021 (aged 86); Tampa, Florida, U.S.
- Military career
- Allegiance: United States
- Branch: United States Army
- Service years: 1957–1996
- Rank: Lieutenant General
- Nickname: Cid
- Commands: Surgeon General of the United States Army
- Conflicts: Vietnam War

Alcide Moodie "Cid" LaNoue (November 2, 1934 – February 20, 2021) was a lieutenant general in the United States Army. He was Surgeon General of the United States Army from September 1992 to September 1996. He attended The Medical Field Service School and the United States Army Command and General Staff College. He was also an alumnus of Harvard College with a B.A. degree in chemistry in 1956 and the Yale School of Medicine with his M.D. degree in 1960. Commissioned in 1957, he was an orthopedic surgeon. Prior to his stint as Surgeon General, LaNoue was Commander of the Eisenhower Army Medical Center, Commandant of the United States Army Academy of Health Sciences, Deputy Surgeon General of the Army, and Commanding General of the United States Army Health Services Command.

His awards include the Distinguished Service Medal (with Oak Leaf Cluster), Legion of Merit (with Oak Leaf Cluster), Bronze Star Medal and Meritorious Service Medal (with 3 Oak Leaf Clusters).

After his death in 2021, LaNoue was interred at Florida National Cemetery.
