= Richard R. Taylor =

Surgeon General of the US Army

Richard Ray Taylor
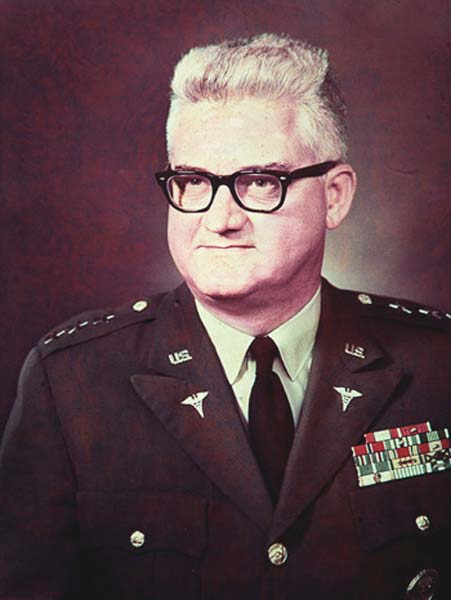
- Lieutenant General Richard R. Taylor
- Born: November 21, 1922; Prairieburg, Iowa, US
- Died: November 8, 1978 (aged 55); Arlington, Virginia, US
- Relatives: First wife, Betty Lou Simson, mother of Carolyn and Richard
- Military career
- Allegiance: United States of America
- Branch: United States Army
- Service years: 1945–1977
- Rank: Lieutenant general
- Commands: Surgeon General of the US Army
- Conflicts: World War II; Korean War; Cold War; Vietnam War
- Awards: Distinguished Service Medal; Legion of Merit (2); Bronze Star Medal

Richard Ray Taylor (November 21, 1922 – November 8, 1978) was a lieutenant general in the United States military and served as the 33rd Surgeon General of the United States Army.

== Biography ==
=== Early life and education ===
Born on November 21, 1922, in Prairieburg, Iowa. He was raised in the small town of Norton, Kansas. His father and two of his four brothers were physicians. His father, Charles Fletcher Taylor, MD was the Superintendent of the State Sanatorium for Tuberculosis, where his brother, David Taylor, MD also served on staff for a time. His mother, Harriet Taylor, was Kansas mother of the year. Dr. Taylor was one of eight siblings. His youngest brother, Danny, died in an automobile accident while he was an architecture student at the University of Kansas. Richard Taylor graduated with a BS from the University of Chicago in 1944 and later from the University of Chicago School of Medicine with his MD in 1946.

=== Military career ===
He worked his way up in ranks in the army from First Lieutenant in 1946 to Colonel in 1964, and eventually to Surgeon General of the US Army in October 1973. He was also in charge of M.A.S.H. units in Vietnam.

=== Later life ===
He died on November 8, 1978, at Arlington Hospital (now known as Virginia Hospital Center) in Arlington, Virginia. He was buried at Arlington National Cemetery. His first wife died of polio in 1949. He is survived by his wife, Frances Colby Taylor, his daughter, Carolyn Jean, and his four sons, Richard Ray Jr., Colby Fletcher, Bryan Dudley, and David Webster.

== Recognition ==
Lieutenant General Richard R. Taylor's ribbon bar:

1st Row	Army Distinguished Service Medal		Legion of Merit with Oak Leaf Cluster
2nd Row	Bronze Star Medal	Joint Service Commendation Medal with Oak Leaf Cluster	Army Commendation Medal
3rd Row	American Campaign Medal	World War II Victory Medal	National Defense Service Medal with oak leaf cluster
4th Row	Korean Service Medal	Vietnam Service Medal with four service stars	Vietnam Army Distinguished Service Order, 1st Class
5th Row	Vietnam Meritorious Medical Award	United Nations Korea Medal	Vietnam Campaign Medal
Badge	Office of the Secretary of Defense Identification Badge		

Military offices
Preceded by Hal B. Jennings	Surgeon General of the US Army; 1973–1977	Succeeded by Charles C. Pixley
