= Military Vaccine Agency =

The Military Vaccine Agency (MILVAX) is a U.S. government program operating within the Office of the U.S. Army Surgeon General which supports all five U.S. Armed Services to enhance military medical readiness by coordinating U.S. Department of Defense (DoD) immunization (vaccination) programs worldwide. MILVAX works to protect servicemember health by facilitating vaccine information, education, scientific understanding, and product quality.

== Operations ==
MILVAX coordinates and assesses U.S. military immunization programs worldwide through a variety of mechanisms, including an integrated electronic immunization tracking program. It is charged with safeguarding the shipping and handling of temperature-sensitive medical products within the military system.

MILVAX synchronizes information among the five US Armed Services and senior DoD staff elements, whom it assists with policy development, especially as related to bio-defense and pandemic issues. It provides education for military and other government healthcare workers and to the public through its website and call-in service.

MILVAX operates an "Immunization University" in coordination with the Vaccine Healthcare Centers Network to provide an informal collection of guidelines and training resources for medical staff. The University offers training on vaccine products and immunization services through distance learning and on-site classes sponsored by MILVAX.
