= Leonard D. Heaton =

Physician and US Army general

Leonard Dudley Heaton
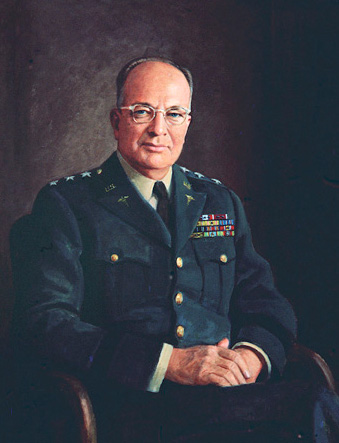
- Born: 19 November 1902; Parkersburg, West Virginia, US
- Died: 10 September 1983 (aged 80); Washington, D.C., US
- Military career
- Allegiance: United States of America
- Branch: United States Army
- Service years: 1927–1969
- Rank: Lieutenant General
- Commands: Surgeon General of the US Army
- Conflicts: World War II; Cold War
- Awards: Army Distinguished Service Medal (4); Legion of Merit (3)

Leonard Dudley Heaton (19 November 1902 – 10 September 1983) was Surgeon General of the United States Army from 1959 to 1969.

== Biography ==
=== Youth and education ===
Heaton was born in Parkersburg, West Virginia. As an undergraduate he attended Denison University in Granville, Ohio graduating in 1922. He then attended the University of Louisville where he would earn his medical degree four years later.

=== Service years ===
Heaton was commissioned as a first lieutenant in the Medical Corps Reserve immediately following his graduation from medical school. In 1940 he was assigned as Chief of Surgical Service in Hawaii. He was among the attending surgeons in the aftermath of the attack on attack on Pearl Harbor, where he operated and treated the wounded for over 24 hours straight. With the entrance of the United States into World War II, Heaton was assigned to the European Theater of Operations. Soon after D-Day, he was appointed as the Commander of the 802d Hospital Center in Blandford, England where he had over 12,000 people working under him.

After the war, Heaton was promoted to brigadier general in 1948. He held many posts including being the commander of the Walter Reed General Hospital in Washington, DC. He became the tenth officer to command the hospital.

General Heaton was made Surgeon General of the Army in June 1959, and was promoted to Lieutenant General (three stars) in September 1959. He was the first Army medical officer to attain this rank, and served a longer term as Surgeon General than any other officer since 1931. Aside from administrative duties, Heaton continued to surgically operate. Among his many patients included President Dwight D. Eisenhower, Secretary of State John Foster Dulles, and Generals of the Army Douglas MacArthur, and George C. Marshall.

As surgeon general, he oversaw the expansion and deployment of Army medical services to Southeast Asia and advocated for the increased use of helicopters for medical evacuation operations in the Army.

=== Retirement ===
Heaton retired from the Army in 1969. He and his wife moved to Pinehurst, North Carolina where they lived quietly until his final illness in 1983. Admitted to Walter Reed in July, he died at his beloved hospital on September 10, 1983.

Heaton's funeral service was held at the Village Chapel in Pinehurst, North Carolina with Chaplain Harry Duncan officiating. He is buried in the Pinelawn Memorial Park in Pinehurst, North Carolina.

== Awards and decorations ==
Army Distinguished Service Medal with three bronze oak leaf clusters
Legion of Merit with two oak leaf clusters
American Defense Service Medal with one bronze service star
Asiatic-Pacific Campaign Medal
American Campaign Medal
European-African-Middle Eastern Campaign Medal
World War II Victory Medal
National Defense Service Medal with oak leaf cluster
Vietnam Army Distinguished Service Order, 1st Class
Order of the Crown of Thailand, Companion
German Cross of Honour in Silver

Military offices
Preceded by Silas B. Hays	Surgeon General of the US Army; 1959–1969	Succeeded by Hal B. Jennings
