= Walter McCaw =

American military officer (1863 –1939)

Walter Drew McCaw
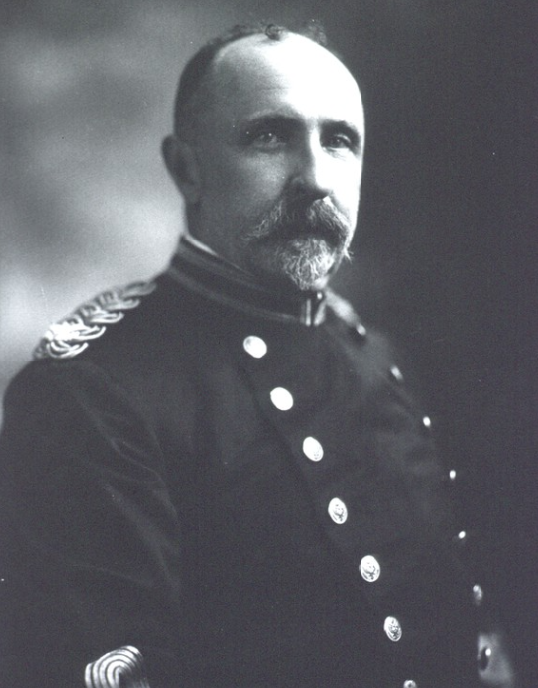
- McCaw as a colonel, circa 1917
- Born: February 10, 1863; Richmond, Virginia, C.S.
- Died: July 7, 1939 (aged 76); Kingston, New York, U.S.
- Burial place: Arlington National Cemetery
- Alma mater: Medical College of Virginia; Columbia University
- Military career
- Allegiance: United States
- Branch: United States Army
- Service years: 1884-1927
- Rank: Brigadier general
- Service number: 0-50
- Unit: U.S. Army Medical Corps
- Commands: Chief Librarian, Army Medical Library; Chief Surgeon, Philippine Department; Chief Surgeon, Eighth Corps Area; Chief Surgeon, Ninth Corps Area; Chief Surgeon, American Expeditionary Forces; Army Medical School; Plans and Training Division, Office of the Surgeon General of the United States Army
- Conflicts: Spanish–American War; Philippine–American War; World War I Occupation of the Rhineland
- Awards: Army Distinguished Service Medal; Silver Star; Order of the Bath; Legion of Honor; Order of Saints Maurice and Lazarus

Walter Drew McCaw (February 10, 1863 – July 7, 1939) was a career officer in the United States Army. A medical doctor, he served as an army surgeon and attained the rank of brigadier general. A veteran of the Spanish–American War, Philippine–American War, and World War I, he was a recipient of the Army Distinguished Service Medal and Silver Star in addition to several foreign decorations.

A native of Richmond, Virginia, McCaw was a member of a family long prominent in the medical field, and his father was a doctor and medical school professor who operated a Confederate hospital during the American Civil War. McCaw graduated from the Medical College of Virginia in 1882, and received a second medical degree from Columbia University in 1884. After completing his education, he passed the examination to serve as an army medical officer and was contracted to serve as an assistant surgeon. In December 1884, he received his commission as an assistant surgeon with the rank of first lieutenant.

McCaw carried out assistant surgeon and surgeon assignments at posts throughout the United States. During the Spanish–American War, he took part in combat as part of the July 1898 Siege of Santiago and silver Citation Star for heroism (later converted to the Silver Star). He took part in the Philippine–American War as a regimental surgeon. After returning to the United States, he became chief librarian of the Army Medical Library, a position he held for twelve years. He then served as surgeon of the Philippine Department (1914–1916).

During World War I, McCaw served as deputy chief surgeon and chief surgeon of the American Expeditionary Forces, for which he received the Army Distinguished Service Medal and several foreign decorations. After the war, he was assigned as commandant of the Army Medical School, then chief of the planning and training division in the Office of the Surgeon General of the United States Army. He retired upon reaching he mandatory age of 64 in 1927. McCaw was a lifelong bachelor and in retirement he was a resident of Woodstock, New York. He died at a hospital in Kingston, New York, on July 7, 1939, and was buried at Arlington National Cemetery.

== Early life and education ==
Walter Drew McCaw was born in Richmond, Virginia, on February 10, 1863, the youngest of nine children born to James Brown McCaw and Delia (Patterson) McCaw. McCaw came from a family long prominent in the medical field; his father operated a military hospital for the Confederate States Army during the American Civil War. After the war, the elder McCaw served as a professor at the Medical College of Virginia, dean of the faculty, and president of the board of visitors.

McCaw demonstrated above average academic ability from an early age, and was educated by private tutors in anticipation of entering medical school. McCaw was nineteen years old when he received his M.D. degree from the Medical College of Virginia in 1882. In 1884, he received a second M.D. from Columbia University.

== Early career ==
In 1884, McCaw passed the examination for appointment in the U.S. Army Medical Corps and was contracted to serve as an assistant surgeon, first at Fort Wingate, New Mexico, then at Fort Lyon, Colorado. In December 1884 he was commissioned assistant surgeon with the rank of first lieutenant.

Early in his career, McCaw carried out assistant surgeon and surgeon assignments in the army's Department of the Missouri. In October 1887, he was assigned to duty at Fort Leavenworth, Kansas. In April 1888, McCaw was posted to Fort Crawford, Colorado. In August 1889, McCaw received promotion to captain and a surgeon's assignment at Fort McPherson, Georgia. In 1891, McCaw was reassigned to Camp Pilot Butte, near Rock Springs, Wyoming.

In July 1893, McCaw was again reassigned, this time to the Presidio of San Francisco. In October 1894, he was posted to temporary duty with the army encampment at Yosemite National Park. In early 1895, McCaw took an extended leave of absence, during which he traveled with his father in the Holy Land. In August 1895, McCaw returned to duty, this time as assistant surgeon at Fort Ringgold, Texas. In July 1897, he was assigned to the post at Fort Thomas, Kentucky.

== Spanish–American War ==
In February 1898, McCaw was a member of a board of medical officers assigned to Fort McPherson to examine candidates for appointment to the United States Military Academy. In April 1898, he served on a panel for the Department of the East which medically evaluated officers recommended for retirement.

In June 1898, McCaw was promoted to temporary major and assigned to the 6th Infantry Regiment. He took part in combat during the Siege of Santiago in July 1898 and was commended for heroism. He later received the silver Citation Star to commend his valor; when the Silver Star medal was later created, McCaw's award was converted to the new decoration. McCaw contracted yellow fever while serving in Cuba and was sent to the army hospital at Montauk, New York, to recuperate.

== Continued career ==
In 1899, McCaw was assigned as surgeon at Fort Porter, New York. In January 1900, he arrived in the Philippines, assigned as surgeon of the 42nd United States Volunteer Regiment during the Philippine–American War. In January 1901, he received permanent promotion to major. After his tour of duty in and around Manila, in January 1902, McCaw returned to the United States and was assigned as surgeon at Fort Wadsworth, New York. Shortly afterwards, he was reassigned to the office of the Surgeon General of the United States Army and posted to duty as chief librarian of the Army Medical Library. McCaw served in this position for twelve years. He was promoted to lieutenant colonel on January 1, 1909 and colonel on May 9, 1913.

In 1914, McCaw was assigned as chief surgeon of the Philippine Department, where he remained until 1916. After his return to the United States, McCaw was assigned as chief surgeon of the Eighth Corps Area at Fort Sam Houston, Texas. In 1917, he was assigned as chief surgeon of the Ninth Corps Area at the Presidio of San Francisco.

== World War I and retirement ==
In 1918, McCaw was assigned to the American Expeditionary Forces in France as deputy to surgeon general Merritte W. Ireland. He served until the end of the war and assisted Ireland in creating and implementing plans for medical support during combat and hygiene for front line soldiers. In October 1918, Ireland returned to the United States and McCaw succeeded him as chief surgeon of the AEF. McCaw remained in this post during the post-war Occupation of the Rhineland, and was nominated for promotion to brigadier general in December 1918. He was awarded the Army Distinguished Service Medal for his services during the war, the citation for which reads:

The President of the United States of America, authorized by Act of Congress, July 9, 1918, takes pleasure in presenting the Army Distinguished Service Medal to Colonel (Medical Corps) Walter D. McCaw, United States Army, for exceptionally meritorious and distinguished services to the Government of the United States, in a duty of great responsibility during World War I. Colonel McCaw's counsel and advice in the early stages of the operations of the American Expeditionary Forces were of particular benefit to the effective work of the Medical Department. As Chief Surgeon of the American Expeditionary Forces, in the later operations in the field, he maintained the splendid efficiency of that department at a critical time and solved each new problem presented with wisdom and marked ability.

McCaw's promotion was confirmed in March 1919 and he returned to the United States the following July. After his return, McCaw was assigned as commandant of the Army Medical School, and he held this position until 1923. After leaving the commandant's post, McCaw was assigned as head of the plans and training division in the office of the Army Surgeon General, and he carried out this assignment until reaching the mandatory retirement age of 64 in February 1927.

== Later life ==
=== Civic and professional memberships ===
McCaw was a Fellow of the American College of Surgeons and an associate fellow of the College of Physicians of Philadelphia He was also an honorary member of the Royal Society of Medicine and the Society of the Cincinnati After his service in Cuba, McCaw became a veteran companion of the Military Order of Foreign Wars and a member of the Military Order of the Carabao.

=== Retirement and death ===
In retirement, McCaw was a resident of Woodstock, New York. He never married or had children, and his household was managed by one of his nieces. In 1934, McCaw sold at auction his extensive collection of rare coins and currency, autographs, stamps, and other collectibles. McCaw died at Benedictine Hospital in Kingston, New York, on July 7, 1939. (Note: Many July 1939 newspaper reports of McCaw's death incorrectly gave his rank as major general.) He was buried at Arlington National Cemetery.

== Awards ==
=== Military awards ===
McCaw received several decorations, to include:

- Distinguished Service Medal
- Silver Star
- Order of the Bath (Honorary Companion) (Great Britain)
- Legion of Honor (Commander) (France) April 10, 1919
- Order of Saints Maurice and Lazarus (Officer) (Italy)

=== Civilian awards ===
In 1932, McCaw received the honorary degree of Doctor of Science from the Medical College of Virginia. In 1942, the army dedicated McCaw General Hospital near Fort Walla Walla, which was named in McCaw's honor. The facility covered nearly 190 acres along what is now Walla Walla's Poplar Street extension, and included 1,000 employees who worked in 88 buildings. McCaw hospital closed in 1945, and two of its buildings were moved across the street to what is now the Jonathan M. Wainwright Memorial Veterans Affairs Medical Center. One of the McCaw Hospital buildings, the chapel, is still used at Wainwright Medical Center.

The Tompkins-McCaw Library at Virginia Commonwealth University (VCU), the successor of the Virginia College of Medicine, was named in honor of five individuals, to include Walter McCaw and his father. In 2020, the VCU Committee on Commemoration and Memorials recommended removing, renaming, or de-commemoration of plaques, buildings, portraits, and other memorabilia associated with support of the Confederacy during the Civil War. In December 2020, the Tompkins-McCaw name was changed to the Health Sciences Library.

== Works by ==
- "The Medical Service Of An Army In Modern War". Journal of the Association of Military Surgeons of the United States. Washington, DC: Association of Military Surgeons of the United States. 1895. p. 334 – via Google Books.
- Walter Reed: A Memoir. Washington, DC: Walter Reed Memorial Association. 1904. p. 1 – via Google Books.
- "Captain John Harris of the Virginia Navy" (PDF). Virginia Magazine of History and Biography. Virginia Historical Society: Richmond, VA. January 1914. p. 1.
