= Silas B. Hays =

United States Army Surgeon General (1902–1964)

Silas Beach Hays
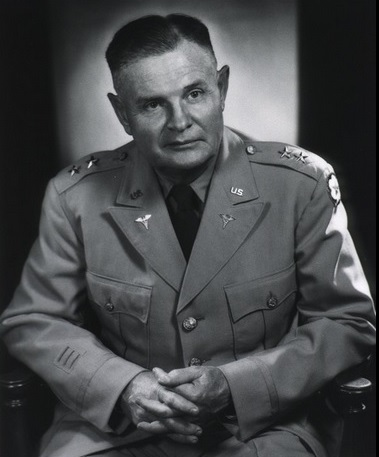
- Silas B. Hays, Surgeon General of the U.S. Army, 1955
- Born: February 18, 1902; Saint Paul, Minnesota, US
- Died: July 24, 1964 (aged 62); Arlington, Virginia, US
- Burial place: Arlington National Cemetery
- Military career
- Allegiance: United States
- Branch: United States Army
- Service years: 1928–1959
- Rank: Major General
- Commands: Surgeon General of the US Army
- Conflicts: World War II; Korean War
- Awards: Distinguished Service Medal (2); Legion of Merit (2)

Silas Beach Hays (February 18, 1902 – July 24, 1964) was a major general who served as Surgeon General of the United States Army.

== Early life ==
Silas Beach Hays was born in Saint Paul, Minnesota, on February 18, 1902, and was raised in Washington, D.C. and West Chester, Pennsylvania. He attended Iowa State University, received a Bachelor of Science degree from the University of Iowa in 1925 and graduated from the University of Iowa with a medical degree in 1928.

== Early career ==
Hays completed the Reserve Officers' Training Corps and received his temporary commission in 1928 as a first lieutenant in the Medical Corps. He completed his internship at Letterman General Hospital in 1929 and received his permanent commission. Hays graduated from the Army Medical School in 1930 and the Army Medical Field Service School in 1931.

Hays specialized in urology and general surgery, and carried out assignments throughout the United States, including: Fort Dix, New Jersey; Tripler Army Medical Center; Walter Reed Army Medical Center; the U.S Soldiers Home; and the Brooklyn Army Terminal. He graduated from the Industrial College of the Armed Forces in 1940 and was assigned to the Finance and Supply Division in the Office of the Surgeon General.

== World War II ==
Hays became a recognized expert on the Army's medical supply process. During World War II, he was assigned as Director of the Distribution and Requirements Division in the Surgeon General's Supply Service, with responsibility for the acquisition, storage and issue of Army medical supplies in the continental United States.

In February 1944, Hays began carrying out a study of the medical supply system in the European Theater of Operations. In May, he was assigned as Chief of the Supply Division in the Office of the European Theater's Chief Surgeon, responsible for acquiring, storing and distributing blood, plasma, penicillin and other medical supplies American service members required during combat in Europe. He was promoted to brigadier general in May 1945. In 1945, Hays returned to the United States and was appointed chief of the Supply Division in the Office of the Surgeon General.

== Korean War ==
In May, 1950 Hays was assigned as Chief Surgeon of United States Army Pacific, and the following September he went to Japan as Chief Surgeon of the Japan Logistical Command. In this assignment he coordinated medical activities for the Korean War, including conversion of facilities to accommodate general hospital units, training and assignment of medical personnel, acquisition and distribution of medical supplies and equipment, and evacuation of the wounded and return of soldiers to duty or transfer to the United States following recovery.

== Post-Korean War ==
In August, 1951 Hays was appointed Deputy Surgeon General of the United States Army and returned to Washington, D.C. He was promoted to major general in 1952, and served until March 1955 when he was appointed Surgeon General. As Surgeon General, he responded to advances in nuclear weapons by supervising efforts to develop measures for protecting Soldiers against exposure to radioactivity and treating those exposed to it. He also expanded training in management of mass casualties, and planned for construction and renovation of Army medical facilities to accommodate an Army that had increased in size substantially since the 1930s.

Hays served as Surgeon General until retiring in July 1959.

== Awards and decorations ==
Army Distinguished Service Medal with one bronze oak leaf cluster
Legion of Merit with oak leaf cluster
American Defense Service Medal
American Campaign Medal
European-African-Middle Eastern Campaign Medal
World War II Victory Medal
Army of Occupation Medal with "Germany" and "Japan" clasps
National Defense Service Medal
Korean Service Medal with two bronze service stars
Ordre de la Santé publique, Officer (France)
Croix de Guerre with bronze Palm (France, WWII)
United Nations Korea Medal

Overseas Service Bars (x3)

== Retirement and death ==
In retirement, Hays resided in Arlington, Virginia, and was employed as Director of the Eastern Area Blood Program for the American Red Cross.

He died in Arlington on July 24, 1964, and is buried at Arlington National Cemetery, Section 4, Grave 2914-A-1.

== Legacy ==
Silas B. Hays Army Hospital at the now closed Fort Ord, California, was named for him.

Military offices
Preceded by George E. Armstrong	Surgeon General of the US Army; 1955–1959	Succeeded by Leonard D. Heaton
