= Ireland Army Community Hospital =

Coordinates: 37°54′02″N 85°56′31″W

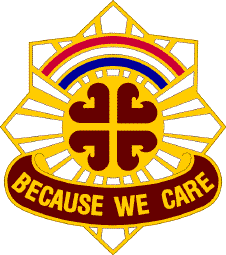
- Ireland Army Community Hospital Distinctive Unit Insignia
- Active: 1957–2020
- Country: United States
- Branch: United States Army
- Garrison/HQ: Fort Knox
- Motto: "Because We Care"

Ireland Army Community Hospital was a United States Army hospital at Fort Knox, Kentucky, that operated from 1957 to 2020. It was named for Major General Merritte W. Ireland, a surgeon who served as Surgeon General of the United States Army from 1918 to 1931. The 462,000-square-foot (42,900 m^{2}), 76-bed facility provided general medical and surgical care, primary and specialty care, and other clinical services, and was part of the U.S. Army Medical Department Activity at Fort Knox.

In 2017, the hospital ended its emergency room, inpatient, and surgical services while retaining specialty and family health clinics. It closed in January 2020, with its services moving to the adjacent Ireland Army Health Center, which opened on January 21, 2020.

== History ==
The earliest hospital at Fort Knox Kentucky, was a World War I cantonment building, constructed in 1918 on the site of the Lindsey Golf Course. When the facility burned in 1928, medical services moved to the World War I guesthouse on Bullion Boulevard until a brick hospital was built in 1934 on E Street. In 1940, two mobilization hospitals were constructed along Dixie Street, and were used until the multi-storied concrete structure opened in 1957. Ireland Army Community Hospital closed January 2020. A replacement clinic (Ireland Army Health Center) opened nearby 21 January 2020.

The hospital facility was named in honor of Major General Merritte W. Ireland, a surgeon and U.S. Army Surgeon General from October 30, 1918, to May 31, 1931. The hospital at 289 Ireland Avenue, Fort Knox, Ky was built in 1957. The hospital closed in 2020, with services moving to the adjacent Ireland Army Health Center (IRAHC), which opened 21 January 2020.

The hospital was a 462,000-square-foot (42,900 m^{2}), 76-bed JCAHO-accredited facility. Major services included general medical and surgical care, adult and pediatric primary care clinics, specialty clinics, clinical services, wellness and prevention services, and a VA clinic. Remote on-post clinics included the Aviation Medical Clinic, One Stop Medical, Nelson Troop Medical Clinic, Reception Medical Processing, and the RCF Clinic.

Ireland Hospital was part of the U.S. Army Medical Department Activity (MEDDAC). The activity is the center of a larger area of responsibility which serves an isolated active duty population in Illinois, Indiana, Kentucky, Michigan, Ohio, and Wisconsin. Off-post clinics in this six-state area include Bluegrass Army Depot, Camp Atterbury Troop Medical Clinic, Fort McCoy Troop Medical Clinic, Rock Island Health Clinic, and Selfridge Health Clinic.

The hospital was slated to lose its inpatient facilities as a result of BRAC 2005, but was removed from the list when panel members raised concerns about the distance soldiers and their families would have to travel to receive inpatient medical care. Reorganizing in 2017, it transitioned from hospital to super clinic, losing its ER, inpatient and surgery services, yet maintaining specialty clinics and its family health clinics.

The hospital facility is slated for demolition in 2021.
