= Merritte W. Ireland =

U.S. Army Surgeon General

Merritte Weber Ireland
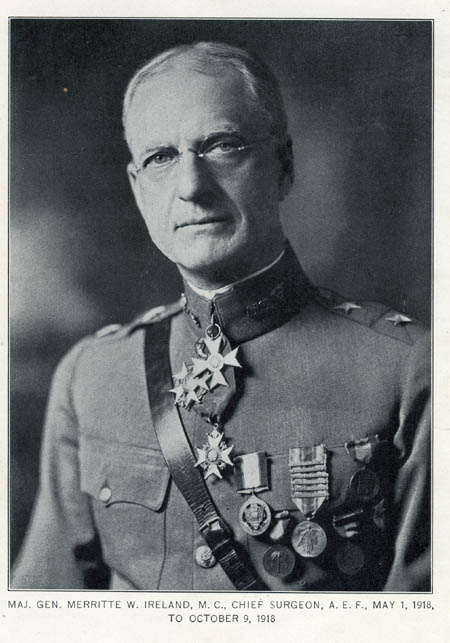
- Maj. General Ireland in 1918
- Born: May 31, 1867; Columbia City, Indiana, U.S.
- Died: July 5, 1952 (aged 85); Washington, D.C., U.S.
- Military career
- Allegiance: United States of America
- Branch: United States Army
- Service years: 1891–1931
- Rank: Major General
- Commands: Surgeon General of the US Army
- Conflicts: Spanish–American War; Philippine–American War; Pancho Villa Expedition; World War I
- Awards: Distinguished Service Medal

Merritte Weber Ireland (May 31, 1867 – July 5, 1952) was the 23rd U.S. Army Surgeon General, serving in that capacity from October 4, 1918, to May 31, 1931.

== Early life and education ==
Ireland was born on May 31, 1867, in Columbia City, Indiana, a town in the upper end of the Wabash Valley in Whitley County, Indiana. His father, Dr. Martin Ireland, was born in Chillicothe, Ohio, and his mother, whose maiden name was Sarah Fellers, came from Waynesboro, Virginia.

He graduated from the Detroit College of Medicine, receiving an M.D. degree in 1890. The following year was spent in Jefferson Medical College where again he earned an M.D. degree in 1891.

== Military career ==
He served as a surgeon with the 45th U.S. Volunteer Infantry in 1899 and honorably discharged in 1901.

In 1903, he was commissioned as a surgeon into the Medical Corps.

During World War I, Ireland served as chief surgeon of the American Expeditionary Forces. He departed France in October 1918 and was succeeded by his deputy, Walter McCaw. He was awarded the Army Distinguished Service Medal for his service during the war, with the medal's citation reading:

The President of the United States of America, authorized by Act of Congress, July 9, 1918, takes pleasure in presenting the Army Distinguished Service Medal to Major General Merritte Weber Ireland, United States Army, for exceptionally meritorious and distinguished services to the Government of the United States, in a duty of great responsibility during World War I. As Chief Surgeon of the American Expeditionary Forces, General Ireland supervised and perfected the organization of the Medical Department in France, and to his excellent judgment, untiring efforts, and high professional attainments are largely due the splendid efficiency with which the sick and wounded of the American Army have been cared for.

He served as Surgeon General from October 4, 1918, to May 31, 1931.

== Death and legacy ==
Ireland died on July 5, 1952.

== Legacy ==
- Ireland's papers are held at the National Library of Medicine.
- Ireland Army Community Hospital, located at Fort Knox, Kentucky, was built in 1957 and named in his honor.

== Military awards ==
Major General Ireland's ribbon bar:

1st Row	Army Distinguished Service Medal	Spanish Campaign Medal	Philippine Campaign Medal
2nd Row	Army of Cuban Occupation Medal	Mexican Service Medal	World War I Victory Medal with four Battle Clasps
3rd Row	Companion of the Order of the Bath (United Kingdom)	Commander of the Legion of Honor (France)	Grand Cross of the Order of Polonia Restituta (Poland)

== Dates of rank ==
Insignia	Rank	Component	Date
	Assistant Surgeon	Regular Army	4 May 1891
	Assistant Surgeon	Regular Army	4 May 1896
	Surgeon	Volunteers	17 August 1899 (Honorably discharged from Volunteers on 30 June 1901.)
	Major	Regular Army	3 August 1903
	Lieutenant Colonel	Regular Army	1 May 1911
	Colonel	Regular Army	15 May 1917
	Brigadier General	National Army	1 May 1918
	Major General	Regular Army	8 August 1918
	Major General	Retired List	31 May 1931

Source: Army Register, 1932
