= James C. Magee =

United States Army general (1883–1975)

James Carre Magee
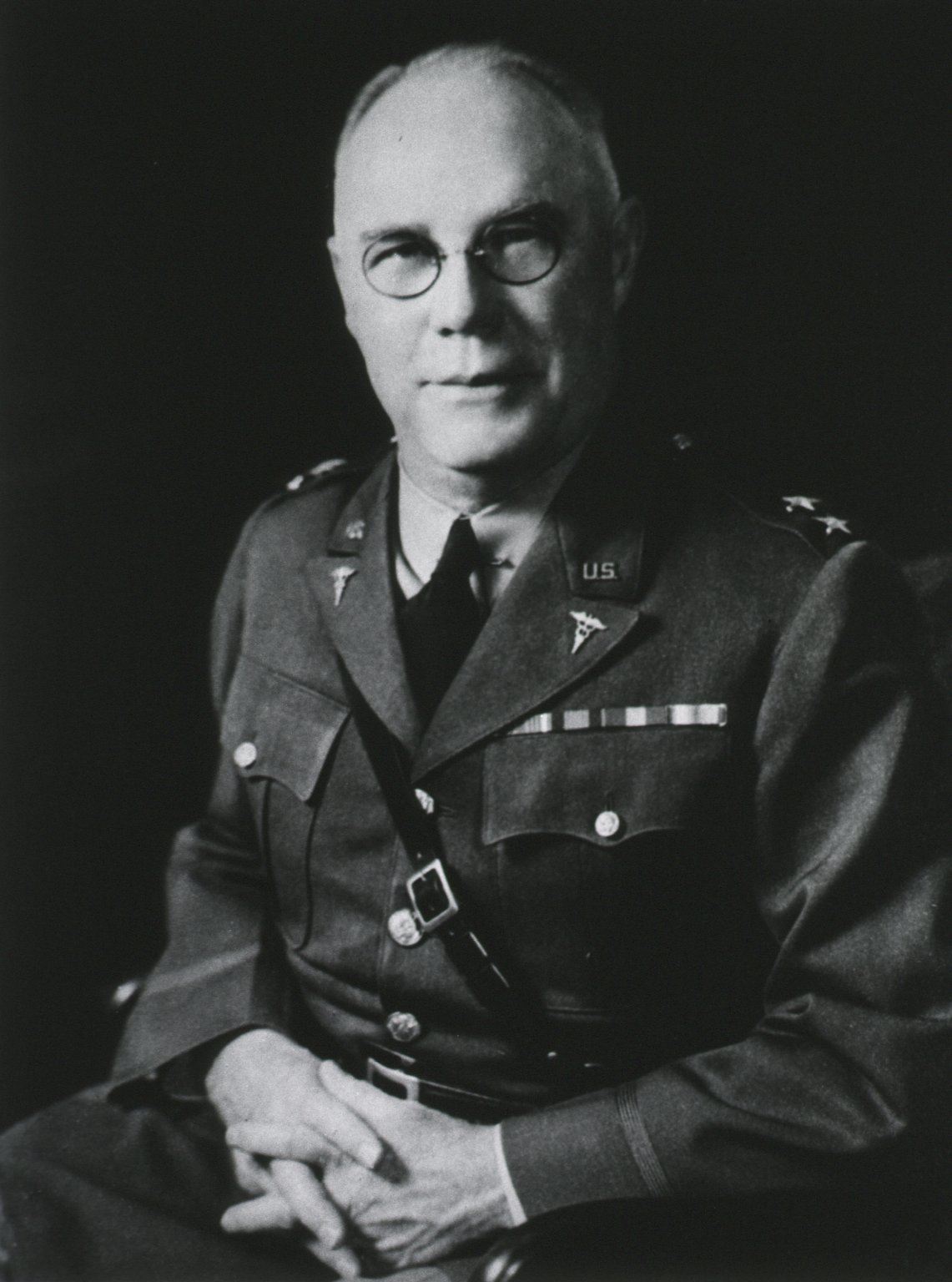
- Born: January 23, 1883; Ireland
- Died: October 15, 1975 (aged 92); Washington D.C
- Spouse: Irene MacKay Magee
- Military career
- Allegiance: United States of America
- Branch: Army
- Rank: Major General
- Awards: Distinguished Service Medal, Purple Heart, World War I Victory Medal

James Carre Magee (January 23, 1883 – October 15, 1975) was an American medical officer and later Surgeon General of the United States Army from 1939 – 1943. He went with the American Expeditionary Force during World War 1 and worked as an assistant to the chief surgeon.

== Personal life ==
James Magee was born on January 23, 1883, in County Donegal, Ireland to Edward Carre Magee and Elizabeth Armstrong Magee. He was the fourth son of a Pennsylvania businessman who was working in Ireland. The Magees returned to Pennsylvania where James Magee spent his youth. He attended Jefferson Medical College in Philadelphia, and received his M.D. in 1905. After graduating he joined the Medical Department as a contract surgeon in 1907 and was commissioned in the Medical Reserve Corps in 1908. He graduated from the Army Medical school in 1909 and joined the medical corps as a first lieutenant. He was part of the American Expeditionary force and went to France from 1917 to 1919.

=== World War 1 ===
Magee, who was promoted to Major on May 15, 1917, and traveled to Base Hospital No. 12 in France. In August 1918, he was assigned as assistant to the chief surgeon Colonel Alexander Stark. While working with Stark, he participated in the St. Mihiel and Meuse-Argonne offensives from September - November 1918. He was awarded the Purple Heart for meritorious services in these operations.

During World war I, Magee achieved the rank of captain and chief surgeon.

=== Interwar period ===
He returned to the United States in 1919 and was transferred to Fort Sam Houston in December. While at Fort Sam Huston he worked as an instructor for the National Guard Medical Department. In June 1922, he went to Washington, D. C., for the Advanced Course in Preventive Medicine at the Army Medical School. Upon completion, he returned to Fort Sam Houston where he served as the division surgeon for the 2nd Division and commanding officer of the 2nd Medical Regiment.

=== Death ===
He died at age 92 at Walter Reed General Hospital and was buried at Arlington National Cemetery.

== Surgeon general ==
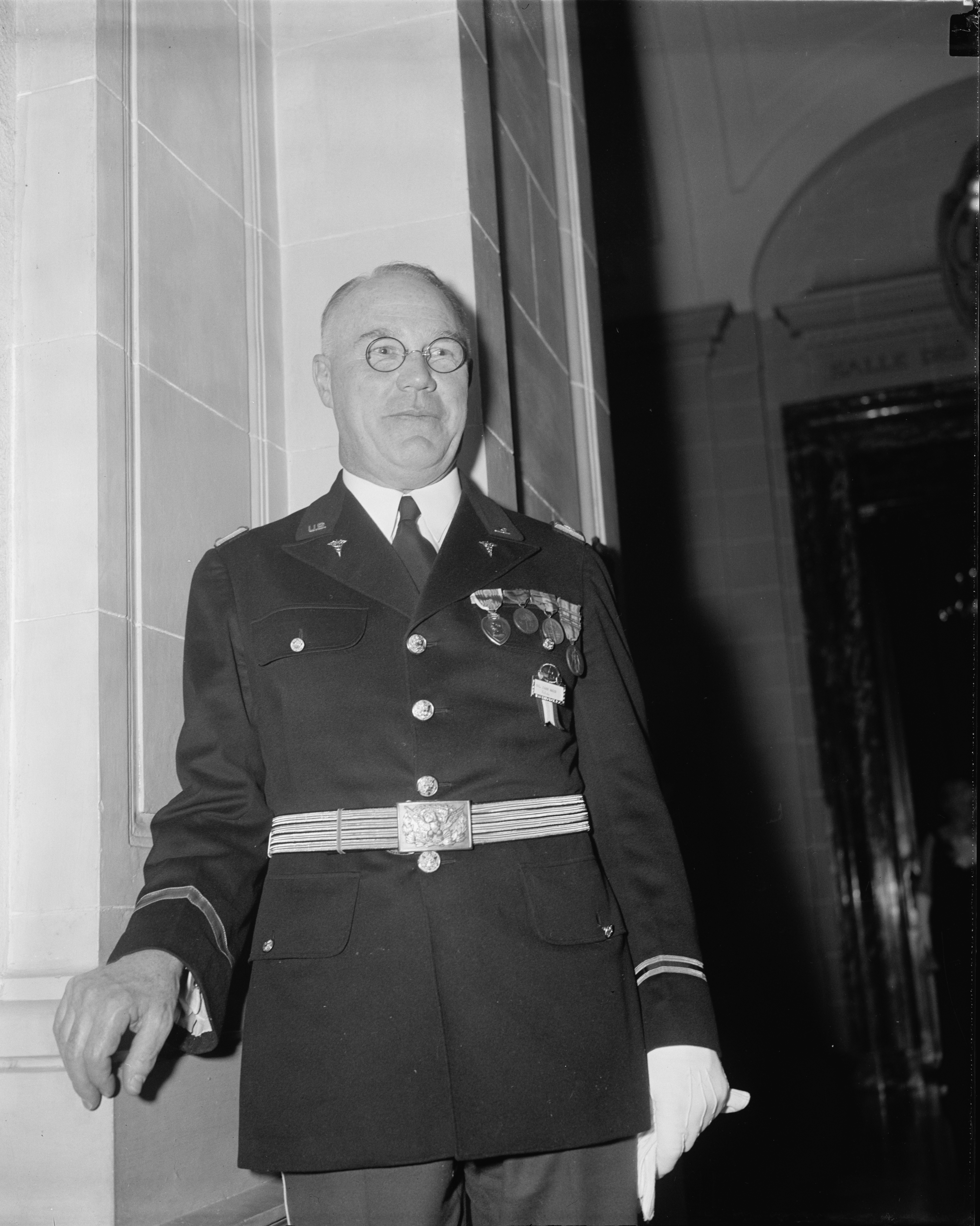
New Surgeon General James C. Magee Washington, D.C., May 8

On June 1, 1939, he was appointed by President Roosevelt to replace Major General Charles R. Reynolds as Surgeon General of the United States Army. The outbreak of World War II in Europe in September 1939 and the declaration of a limited national emergency by President Franklin D. Roosevelt that month confronted the new Surgeon General with enormous difficulties as the Army slowly began preparing for war. Magee had to confront the huge problems in preparing the Army Medical Department for its wartime expansion.

General Magee's tenure was marked by both successes and criticism. Magee was not a favorite of Army Chief of Staff, General George Marshall and Lieutenant General Brehon B. Somervell, commander of the Services of Supply. This eventually resulted in a major investigation by the War Department's Wadhams Committee from August through November 1942. The committee's final report was issued in November 1942 and outlined recommendations to improve the efficiency of the Army Medical Services. Many of the recommendations were never implemented until early in 1943. Magee's adversaries may have encouraged the Wadhams Committee investigation of the Medical Department in an attempt to remove him from his position but failed.

George Marshall was able to convince president Franklin D. Roosevelt to not reappoint him to the position after his four-year term as surgeon general was over. He retired from the position on May 31, 1943.
