= Surgeon General of the United States Army =

Most senior officer of the US Army Medical Department

- Army staff identification badge

- Flag of the surgeon general of the Army, depicting the caduceus

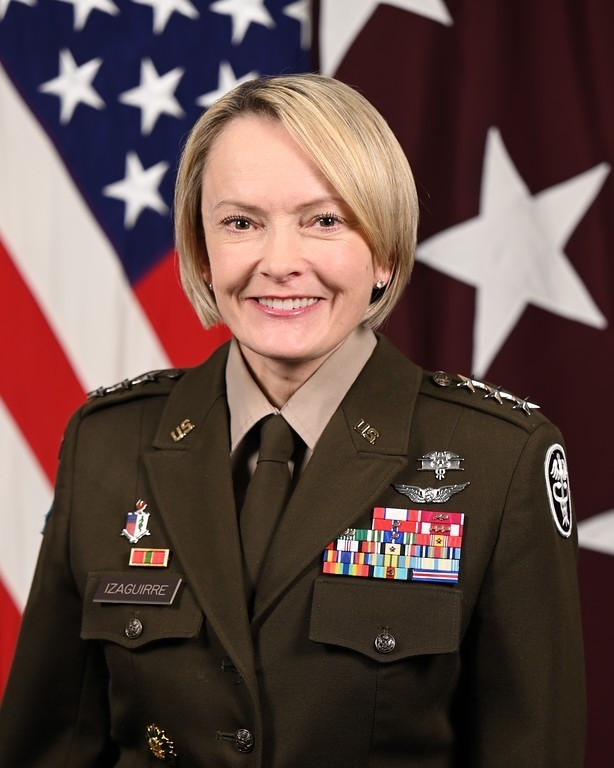
- Incumbent; LTG Mary K. Izaguirre since January 25, 2024
- Department of the Army; United States Army
- Abbreviation: TSG
- Reports to: Secretary of the Army; Chief of Staff of the Army
- Seat: The Pentagon, Arlington, Virginia, United States
- Appointer: The president; with United States Senate's advice and consent
- Term length: 4 years
- Constituting instrument: 10 U.S.C. § 3036
- Formation: March 13, 1813; 213 years ago
- First holder: Benjamin Church, Jr.
- Deputy: Deputy Surgeon General of the Army
- Website: Army.mil/ArmyMedicine

The surgeon general of the United States Army is the senior-most officer of the U.S. Army Medical Department (AMEDD). By policy, the surgeon general (TSG) serves as commanding general, U.S. Army Medical Command (MEDCOM) as well as head of the AMEDD. The surgeon general's office and staff are known as the Office of the Surgeon General (OTSG) and are located in Falls Church, Virginia.

Since 1959, TSG has been appointed in the grade of lieutenant general. By law, TSG may be appointed from any of the six officer branches of the AMEDD. However, prior to the 43rd surgeon general, Lt. Gen. Patricia Horoho — an Army Nurse Corps officer — all appointed and confirmed surgeons general have been Medical Corps officers — military physicians. The incumbent surgeon general is Lieutenant General Mary K. Izaguirre.

== Duties ==
As a commanding general, TSG provides advice and assistance to the chief of staff, Army (CSA) and to the secretary of the Army (SECARMY) on all health care matters pertaining to the U.S. Army and its military health care system. The incumbent is responsible for development, policy direction, organization and overall management of an integrated Army-wide health service system and is the medical materiel developer for the Army. These duties include formulating policy regulations on health service support, health hazard assessment and the establishment of health standards. TSG is assisted by the deputy surgeon general.

== History ==
Congress established the Medical Service of the Continental Army on July 27, 1775, and placed a "chief physician & director general" of the Continental Army as its head. The first five surgeons general of the U.S. Army served under this title. An Act of Congress of May 28, 1789, established a "physician general" of the U.S. Army. Only two physicians, doctors Richard Allison and James Craik, served under this nomenclature. A congressional act of March 3, 1813, cited the "physician & surgeon general" of the U.S. Army. That nomenclature remained in place until the Medical Department was established by the Reorganization Act of April 14, 1818. Additionally, physicians assigned to the U.S. Army were not accorded military rank until 1847.

== Surgeons general of the U.S. Army and their precursors ==
Incumbents from July 27, 1775 – including periods of vacancy
No.	Image	Name	Dates of tenure	Military rank
1		Benjamin Church, Jr.	July 27, 1775 – October 16, 1775	None
2		John Morgan	October 16, 1775 – January 1777	None
3		William Shippen, Jr.	April 11, 1777 – January 17, 1781	None
4		John Cochran	January 17, 1781 – 1783	None
			1783–1792	
5		Richard Allison	1792–1796	None
			1796 – August 1, 1798	
6		James Craik	August 1, 1798 – June 15, 1800	None
			June 15, 1800 – June 11, 1813	
7		James Tilton	June 11, 1813 – June 15, 1815	None
			June 15, 1815–April 18, 1818	
8		Joseph Lovell	April 18, 1818 – October 17, 1836	None
9		Thomas Lawson	October 17, 1836 – May 15, 1861	Brevet Brigadier General
10		Clement Finley	May 15, 1861 – April 28, 1862	Brigadier General
11		William A. Hammond	April 28, 1862 – August 18, 1864	Brigadier General
12		Joseph Barnes	August 18, 1864 – June 30, 1882	Brigadier General
			June 30, 1882 – July 3, 1882	
13		Charles H. Crane	July 3, 1882 – October 10, 1883	Brigadier General
14		Robert Murray	October 10, 1883 – August 6, 1886	Brigadier General
			August 6, 1886 – November 18, 1886	
15		John Moore	November 18, 1886 – 16 August 1890	Brigadier General
16		Jedediah Hyde Baxter	August 16, 1890 – December 4, 1890	Brigadier General
			December 4, 1890 – December 23, 1890	
17		Charles Sutherland	December 23, 1890 – May 30, 1893	Brigadier General
18		George Miller Sternberg	May 30, 1893 – June 8, 1902	Brigadier General
19		William H. Forwood	June 8, 1902 – September 7, 1902	Brigadier General
20		Robert Maitland O'Reilly	September 7, 1902 – January 14, 1909	Brigadier General
21		George H. Torney	January 14, 1909 – December 27, 1913	Brigadier General
22		William C. Gorgas	January 1914 – 1918	Major General
23		Merritte W. Ireland	October 4, 1918 – May 31, 1931	Major General
24		Robert U. Patterson	1931–1935	Major General
25		Charles R. Reynolds	1935–1939	Major General
26		James C. Magee	June 1, 1939 – May 31, 1943	Major General
27		Norman T. Kirk	1943–1947	Major General
28		Raymond W. Bliss	1947–1951	Major General
29		George E. Armstrong	1951–1955	Major General
30		Silas B. Hays	1955 – June 1959	Major General
31		Leonard D. Heaton	June 1959 – 1969	Lieutenant General
32		Hal B. Jennings	October 10, 1969 – October 1, 1973	Lieutenant General
33		Richard R. Taylor	October 1, 1973 – October 1, 1977	Lieutenant General
34		Charles C. Pixley	October 1, 1977 – September 20, 1981	Lieutenant General
35		Bernhard T. Mittemeyer	October 1, 1981 – February 1, 1985	Lieutenant General
36		Quinn H. Becker	February 1, 1985 – May 31, 1988	Lieutenant General
37		Frank F. Ledford Jr.	June 1, 1988 – June 30, 1992	Lieutenant General
38		Alcide M. Lanoue	September 8, 1992 – September 30, 1996	Lieutenant General
39		Ronald R. Blanck	October 1, 1996 – September 22, 2000	Lieutenant General
40		James Peake	September 22, 2000 – July 8, 2004	Lieutenant General
			July 8, 2004 – September 30, 2004	
41		Kevin C. Kiley	September 30, 2004 – March 12, 2007	Lieutenant General (retired as Major General)
			March 12, 2007 – December 11, 2007	
42		Eric Schoomaker	December 11, 2007 – December 5, 2011	Lieutenant General
43		Patricia Horoho	December 5, 2011 – December 3, 2015	Lieutenant General
			December 3, 2015 – December 11, 2015	
44		Nadja West	December 11, 2015 – July 19, 2019	Lieutenant General
			July 19, 2019 – October 17, 2019	
45		R. Scott Dingle	October 17, 2019 – January 25, 2024	Lieutenant General
46		Mary K. Izaguirre	January 25, 2024 – present	Lieutenant General

- Note: The AMEDD Museum at Fort Sam Houston, San Antonio, Texas, has a display on the Army Surgeons General, including images of each one, except for Richard Allison.

== Agencies, centers, offices, and programs within the OTSG ==
- Military Vaccine Agency (MILVAX)
- Borden Institute
- U.S. Army Medical Information Technology Center (USAMITC)
- Army Human Research Protections Office (AHRPO)
- Pharmacovigilance Center

== See also ==
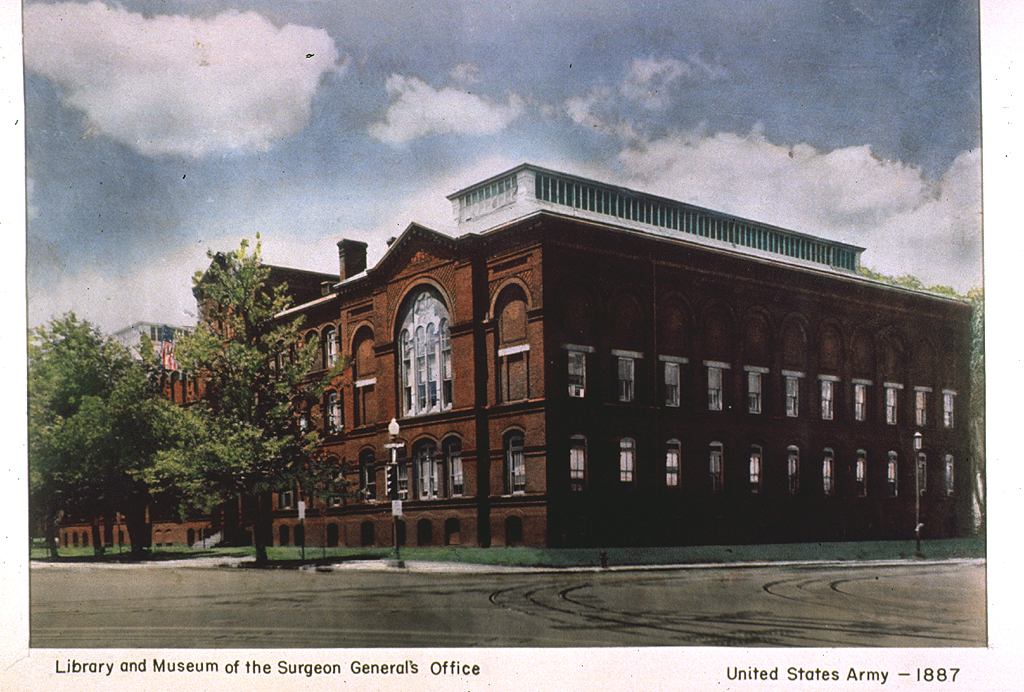
Library and Museum of the OTSG, Washington, D.C.; Hand-colored photo, 1887.

- Library of the Surgeon General's Office, now the National Library of Medicine
- Medical Corps (United States Army)
- Surgeon General of the United States
- Surgeon General of the United States Navy
- Surgeon General of the United States Air Force

== References and notes ==
- Heitman, Francis B. (1903), Historical Register and Dictionary of the United States Army, from Its Organization, September 29, 1789, to March 2, 1903; Washington, DC: Government Printing Office; 2 vol. (Vol. 1, pp 41–42 details the Medical Department.)
