= Brigade insignia of the United States Army =

A shoulder sleeve insignia (SSI) is an embroidered emblem worn on the sleeves of some United States Army uniforms to identify the primary headquarters to which a soldier is assigned. Like division sized units, separate brigades of the U.S. Army are allowed their own SSI to distinguish their wearers from those of other units. Most military units smaller than brigades do not have SSI, but rather wear the SSI of a higher headquarters. The following list of SSIs represent some of the current and former brigades of the U.S. Army:

== Air defense artillery Brigades ==
6th Air Defense Artillery Brigade 1942-2012 Is Now United States Army Air Defense Artillery School

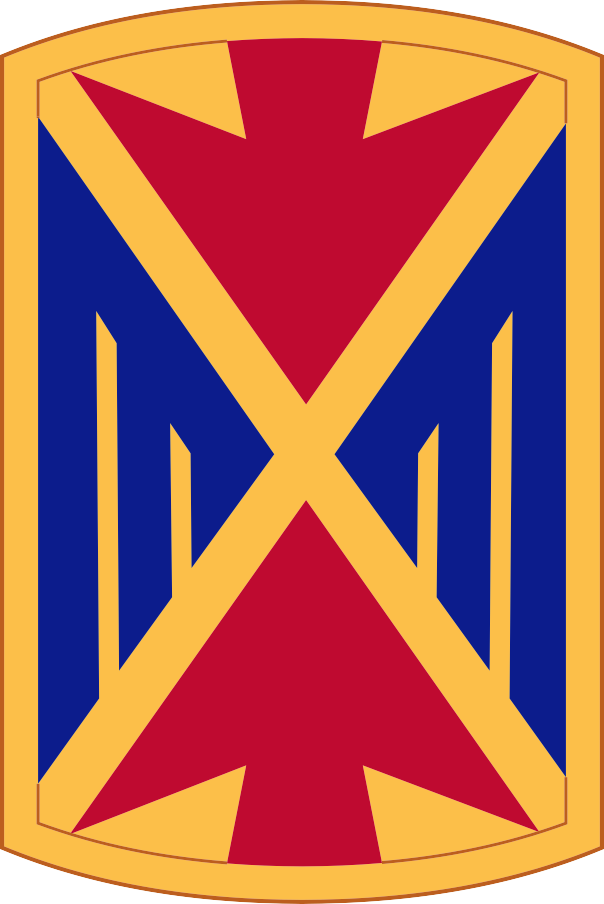
10th Air Defense Artillery Brigade 1983-1992 Is Now 10th Army Air and Missile Defense Command

11th Air Defense Artillery Brigade

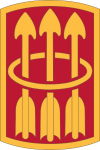
30th Air Defense Artillery Brigade

31st Air Defense Artillery Brigade

35th Air Defense Artillery Brigade

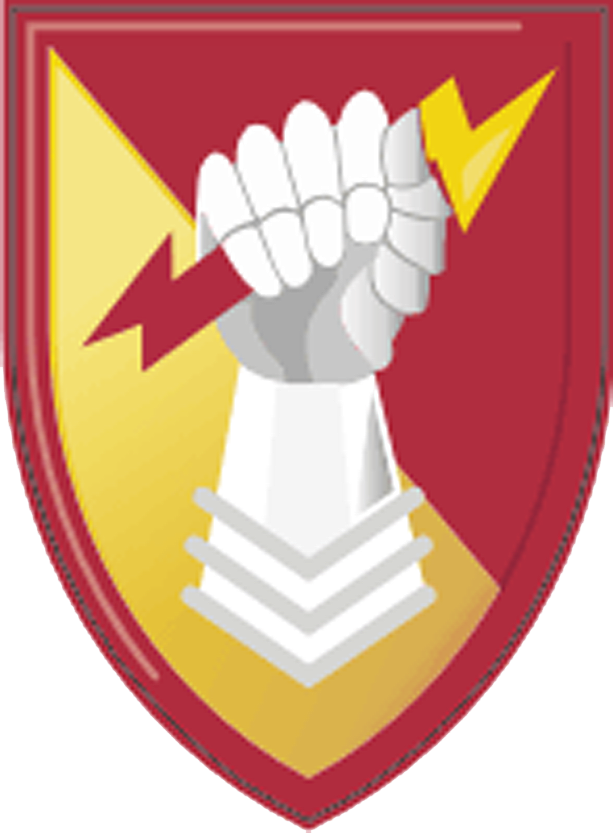
38th Air Defense Artillery Brigade

69th Air Defense Artillery Brigade

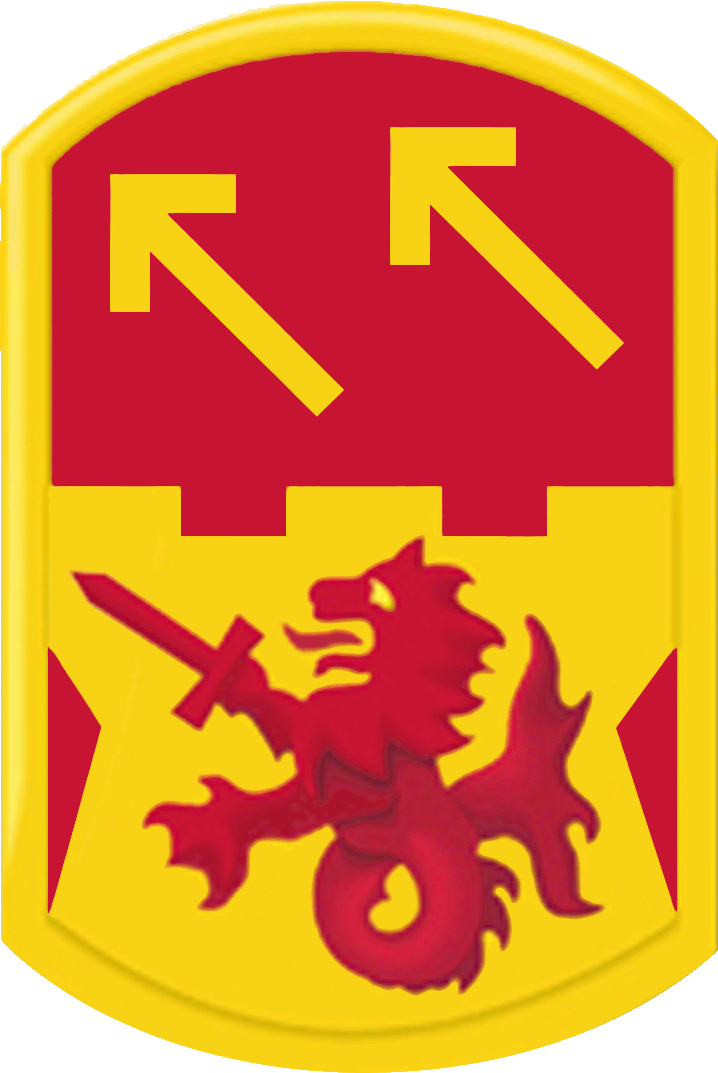
94th Air Defense Artillery Brigade

108th Air Defense Artillery Brigade

111th Air Defense Artillery Brigade
Now is the 111th Sustainment Brigade

164th Air Defense Artillery Brigade

174th Air Defense Artillery Brigade

263rd Air Defense Artillery Brigade

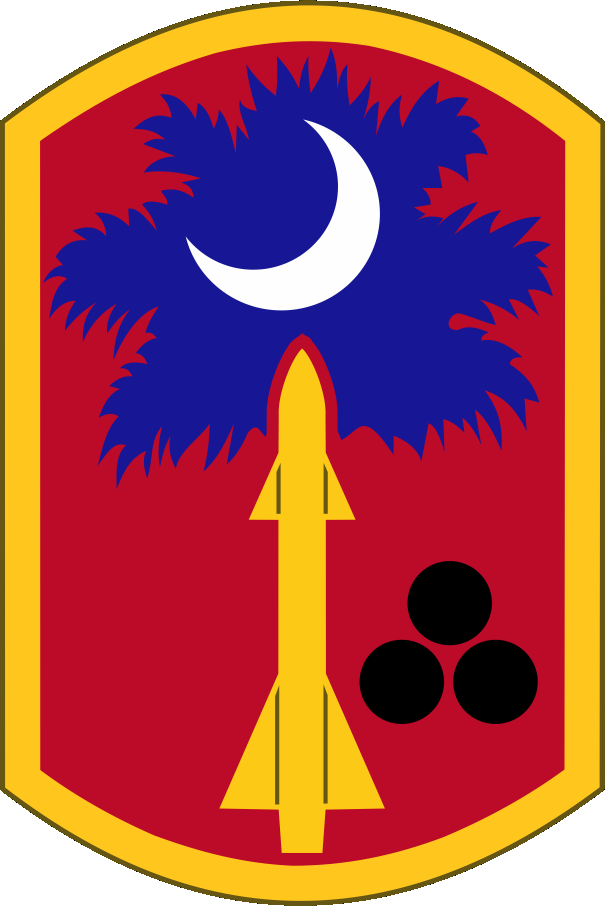
678th Air Defense Artillery Brigade

== Armored Brigades ==
5th Armored Brigade

30th Armored Brigade

40th Armored Brigade Now the 40th Infantry Brigade Combat Team

53rd Armored Brigade Now the 53rd Infantry Brigade Combat Team

81st Armored Brigade

86th Armored Brigade Now the 86th Infantry Brigade Combat Team

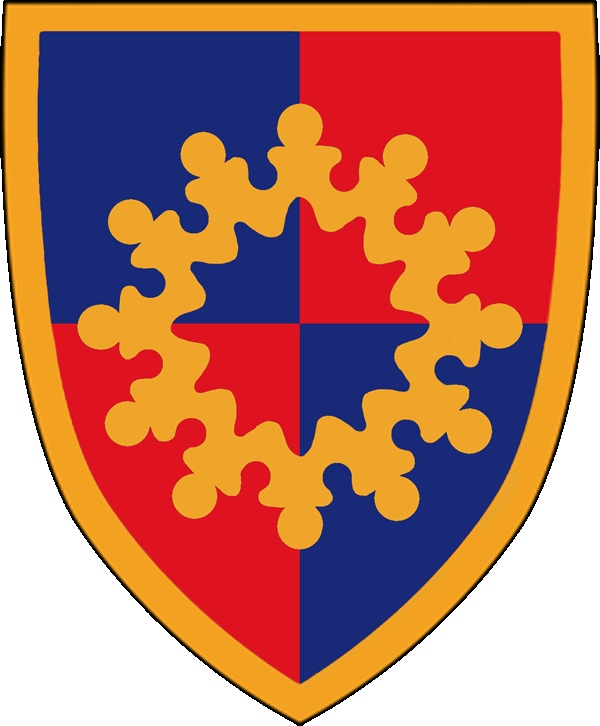
149th Armored Brigade Now the 149th Maneuver Enhancement Brigade

155th Armored Brigade

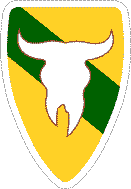
163rd Armored Brigade Is now 163rd Cavalry Regiment

177th Armored Brigade

194th Armored Brigade

== Aviation Brigades ==
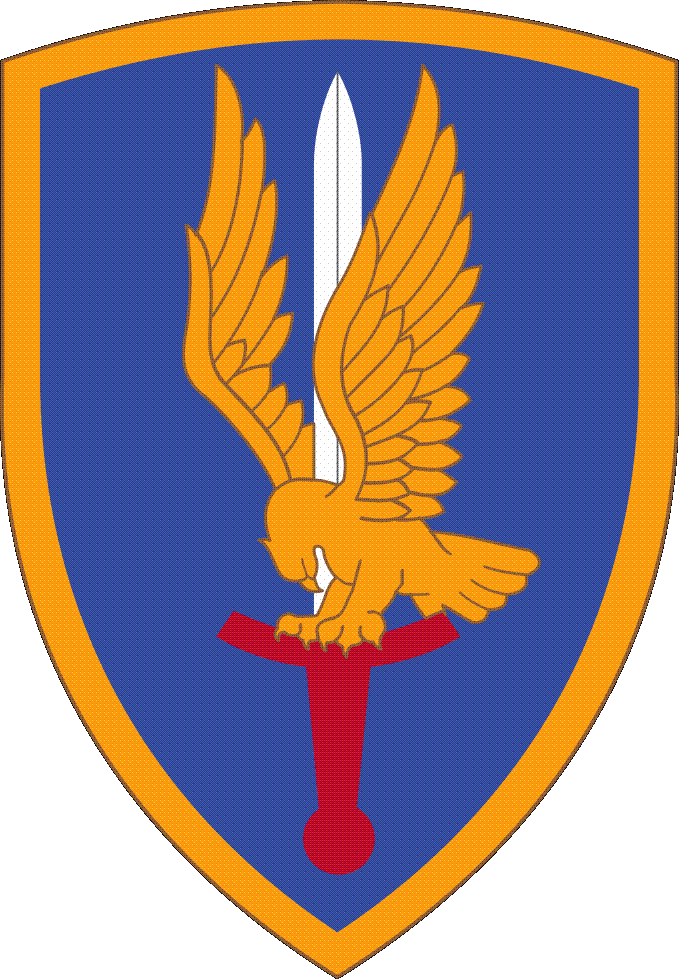
1st Aviation Brigade

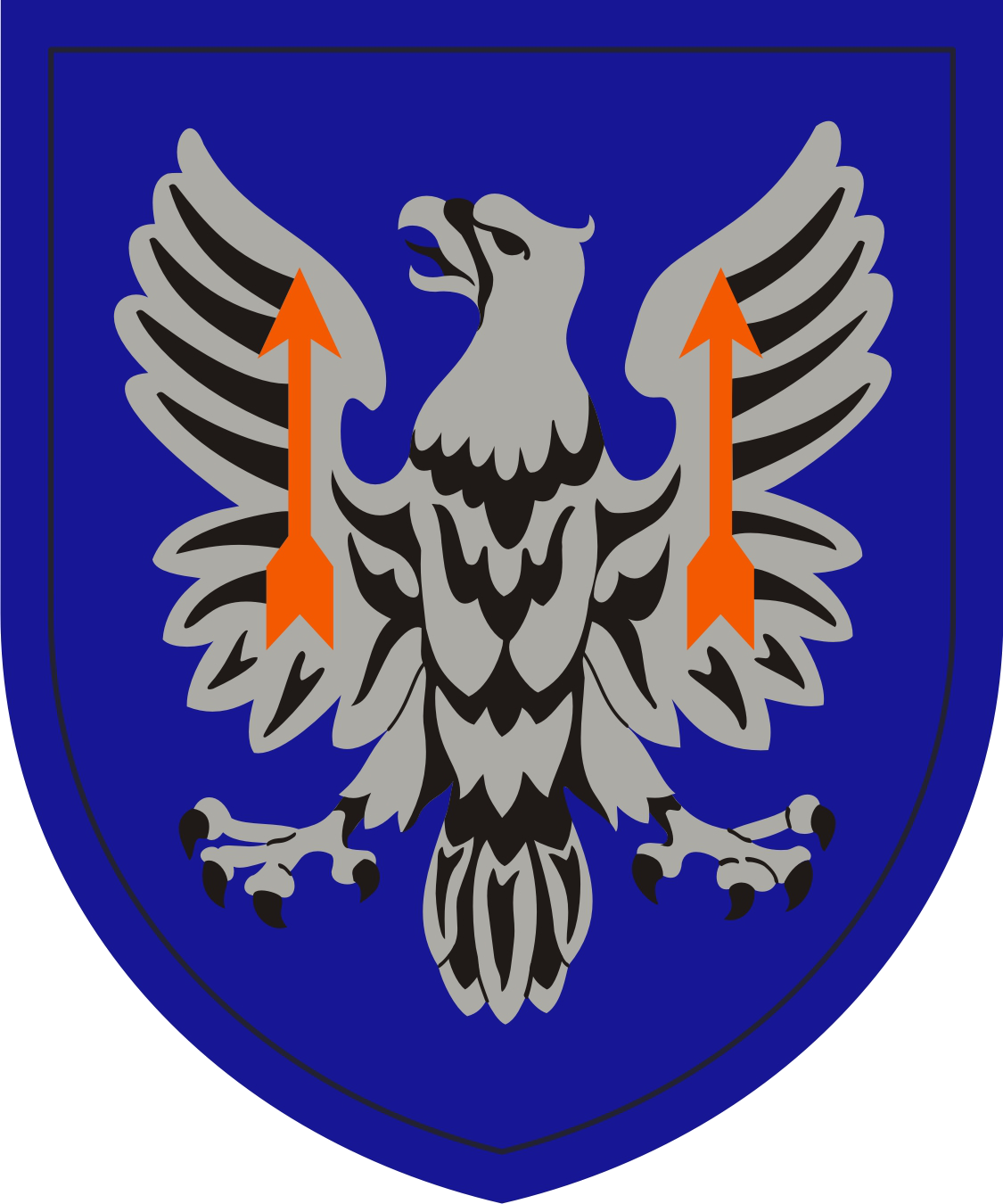
11th Aviation Brigade

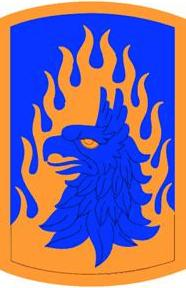
12th Combat Aviation Brigade

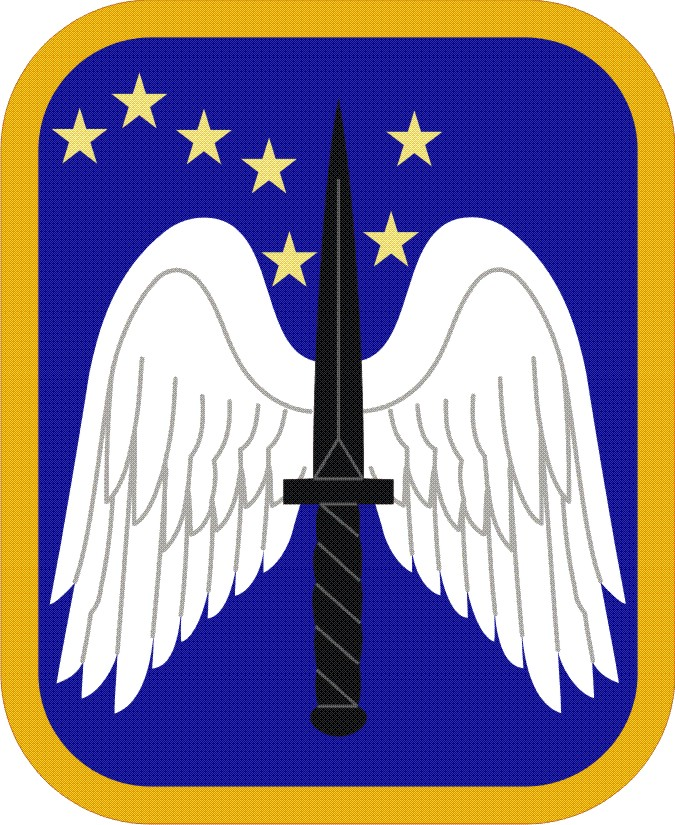
16th Combat Aviation Brigade

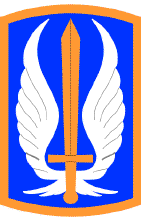
17th Aviation Brigade

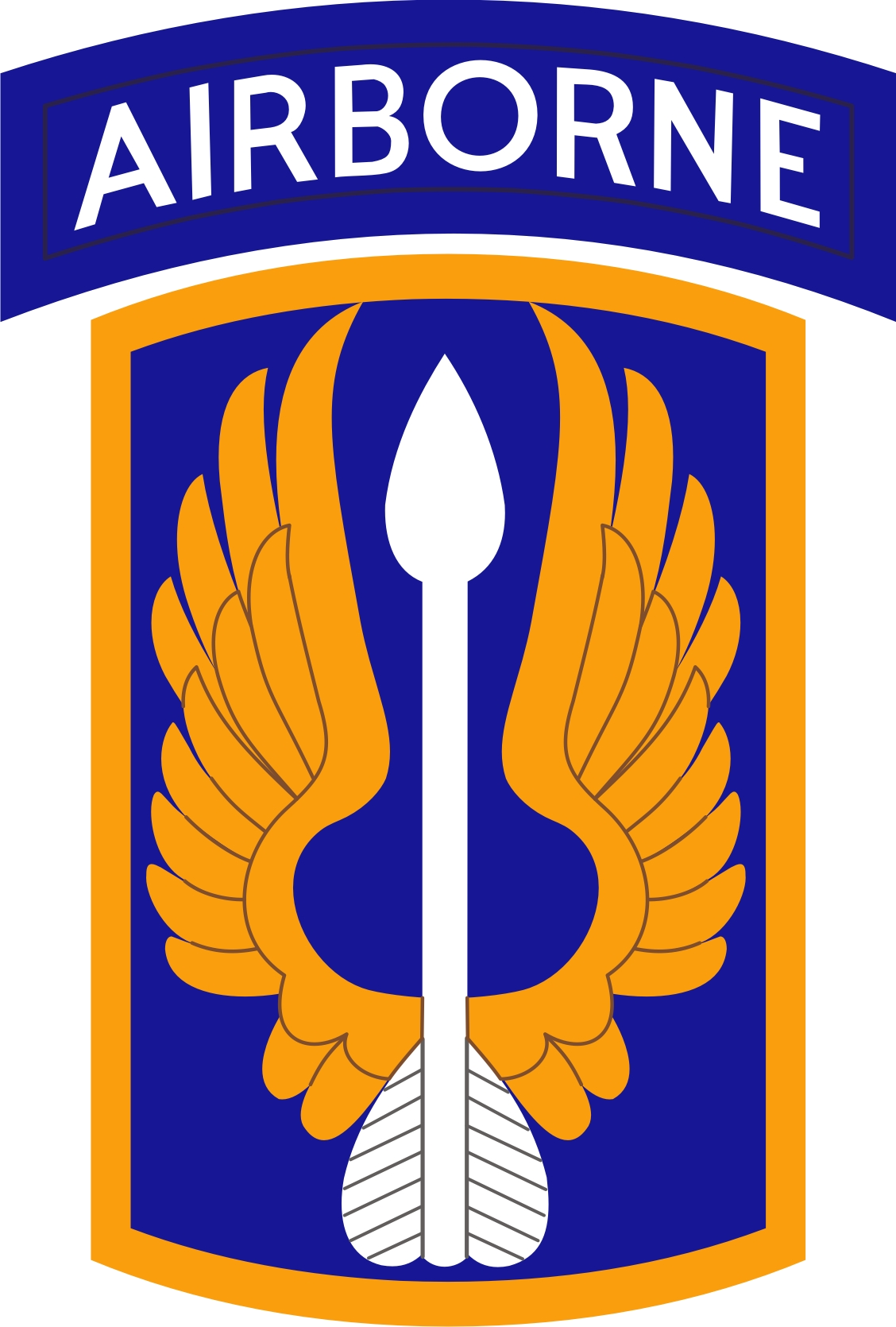
18th Aviation Brigade

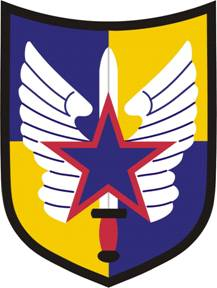
20th Aviation Brigade

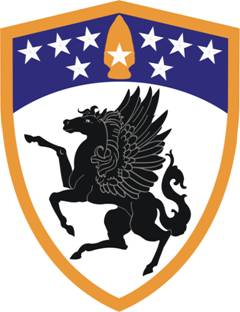
63rd Theater Aviation Brigade

66th Aviation Brigade

77th Combat Aviation Brigade

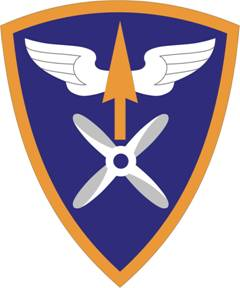
110th Aviation Brigade

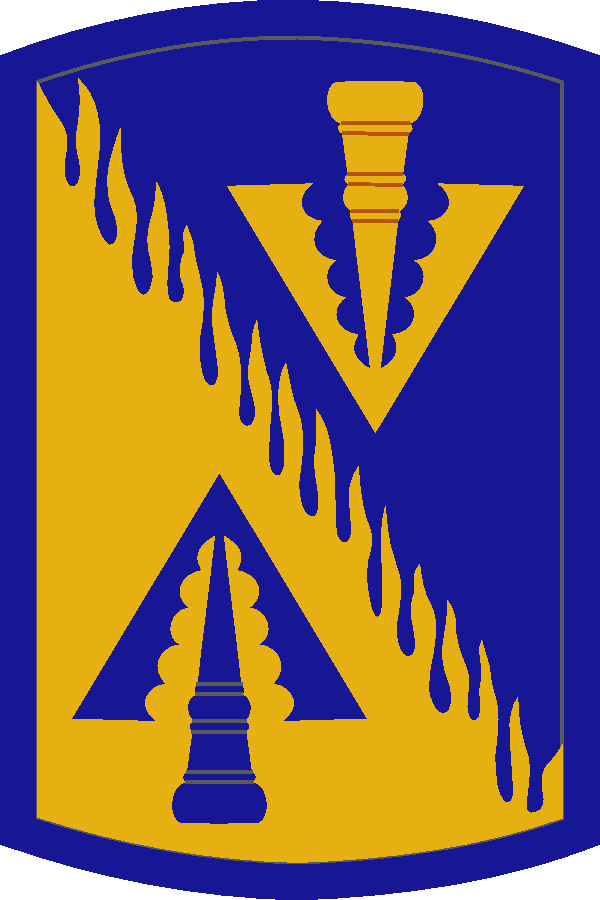
128th Aviation Brigade

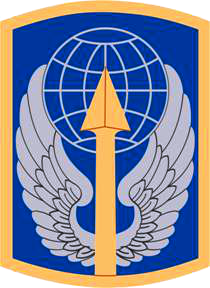
166th Aviation Brigade

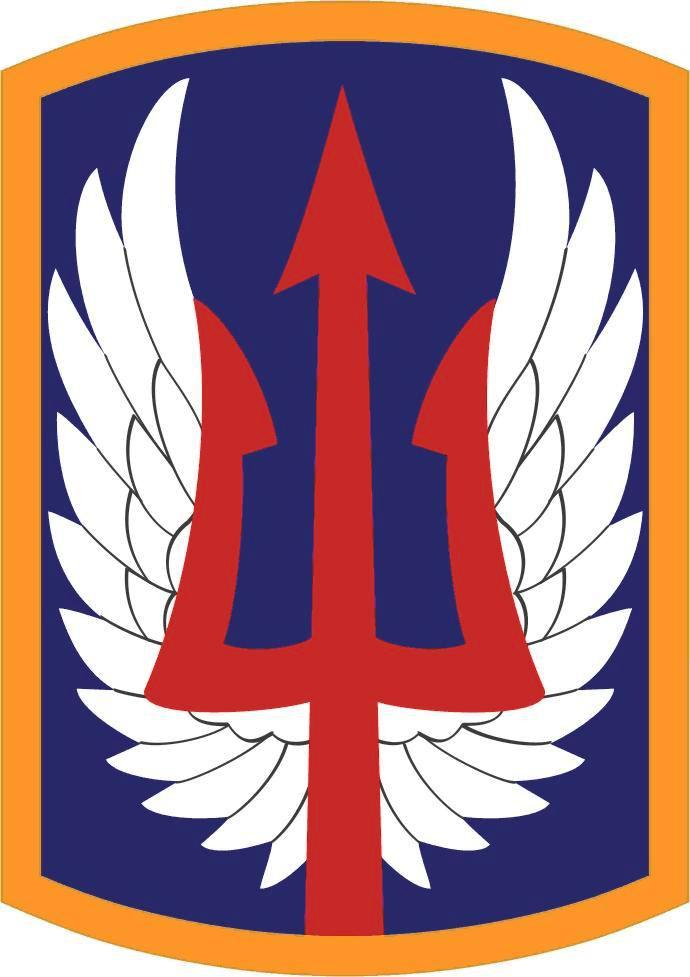
185th Aviation Brigade

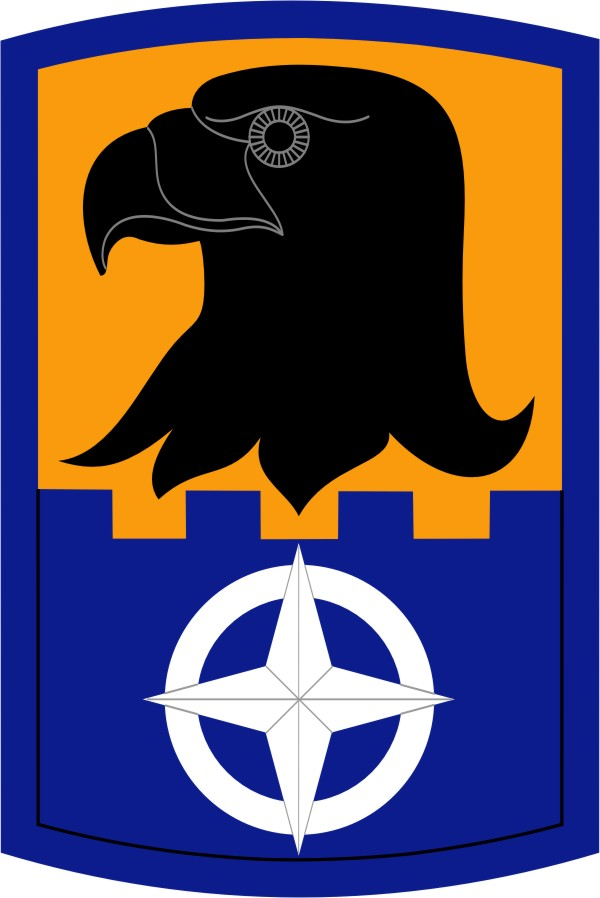
244th Aviation Brigade

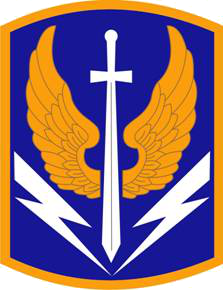
449th Aviation Brigade

== Battlefield surveillance Brigades ==
58th Battlefield Surveillance Brigade
(Is Now 58th Expeditionary Military Intelligence Brigade)

67th Battlefield Surveillance Brigade
(Is Now 67th Maneuver Enhancement Brigade)

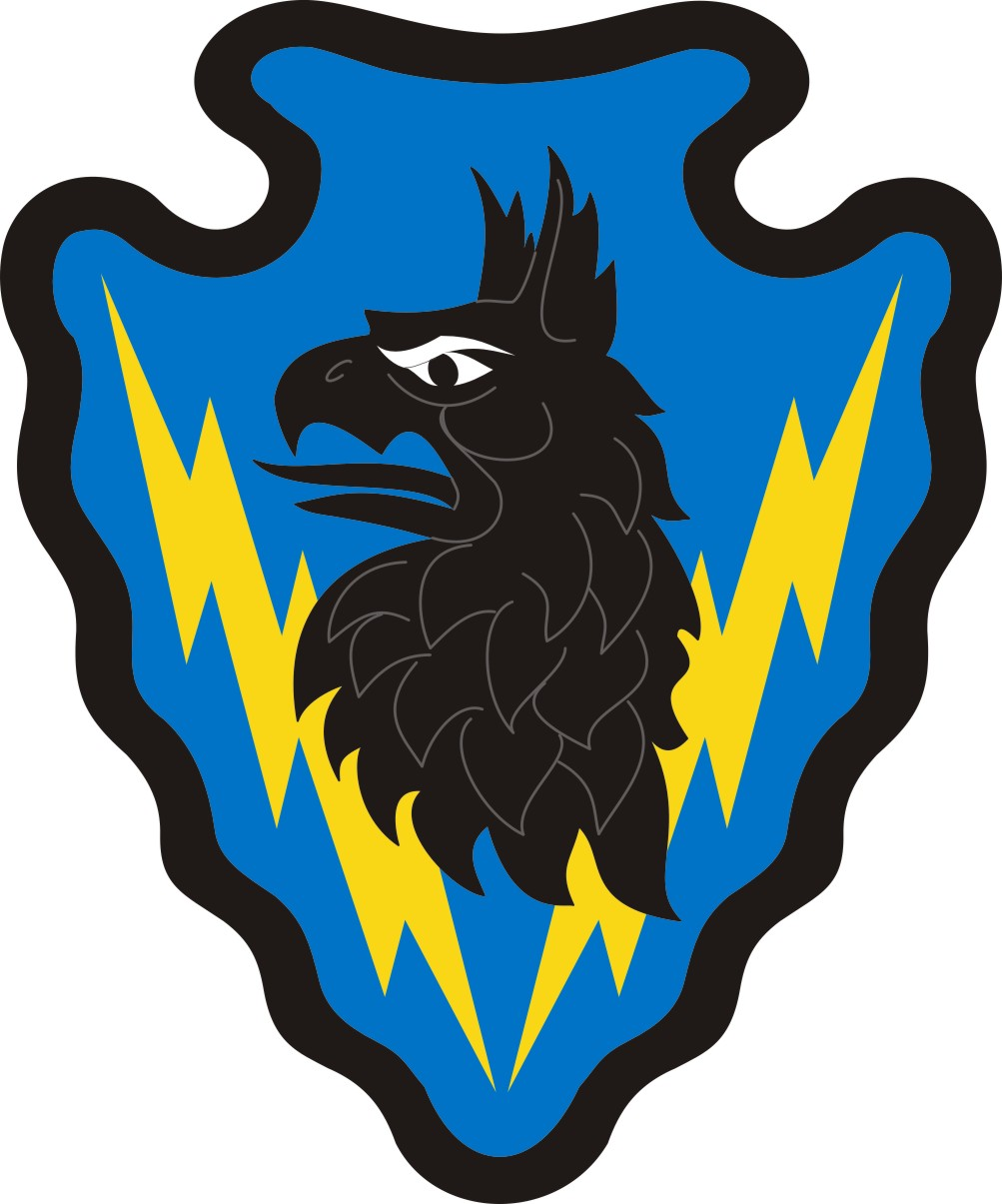
71st Battlefield Surveillance Brigade (Is Now 71st Expeditionary Military Intelligence Brigade)

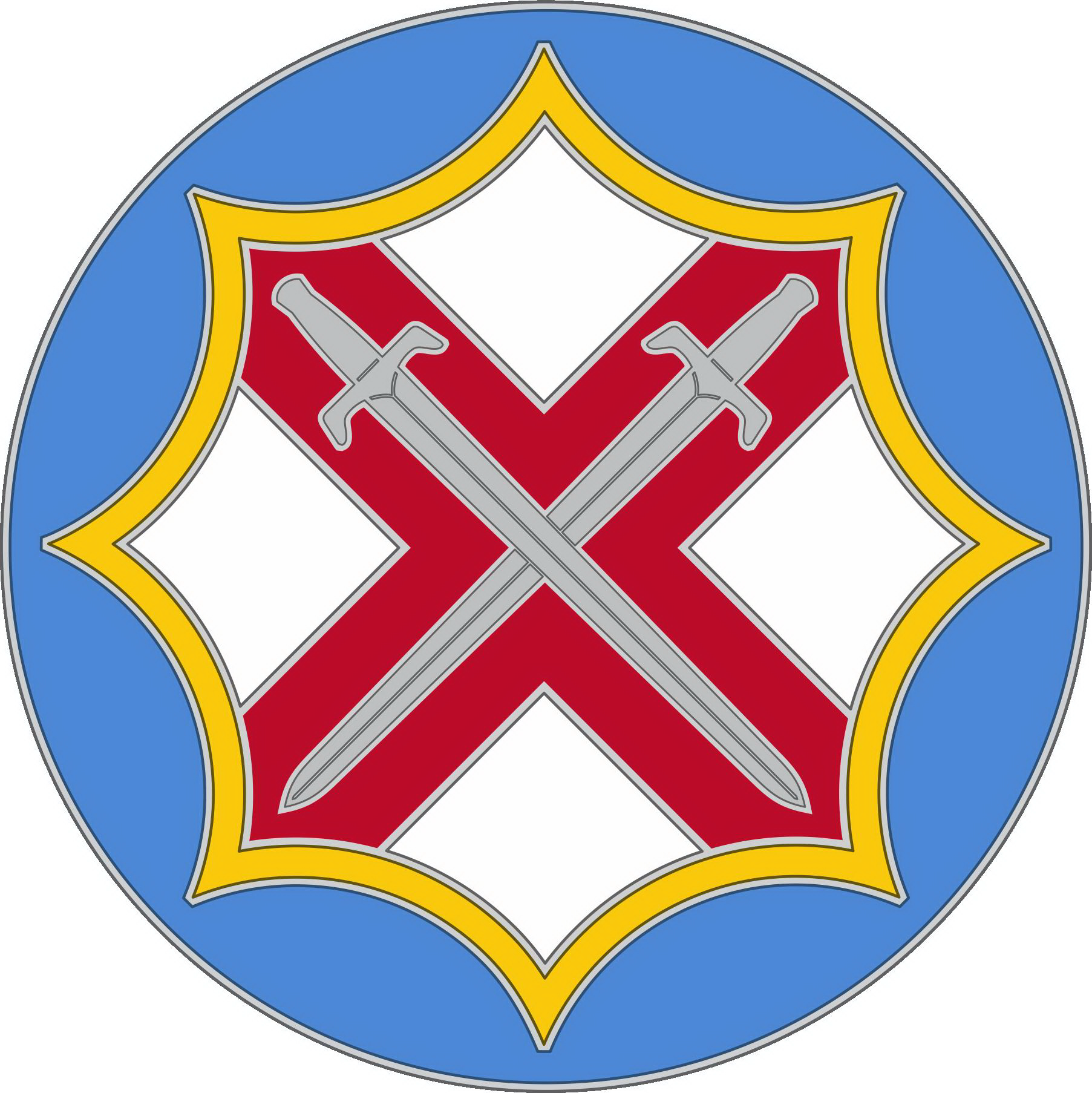
142nd Battlefield Surveillance Brigade

219th Battlefield Surveillance Brigade

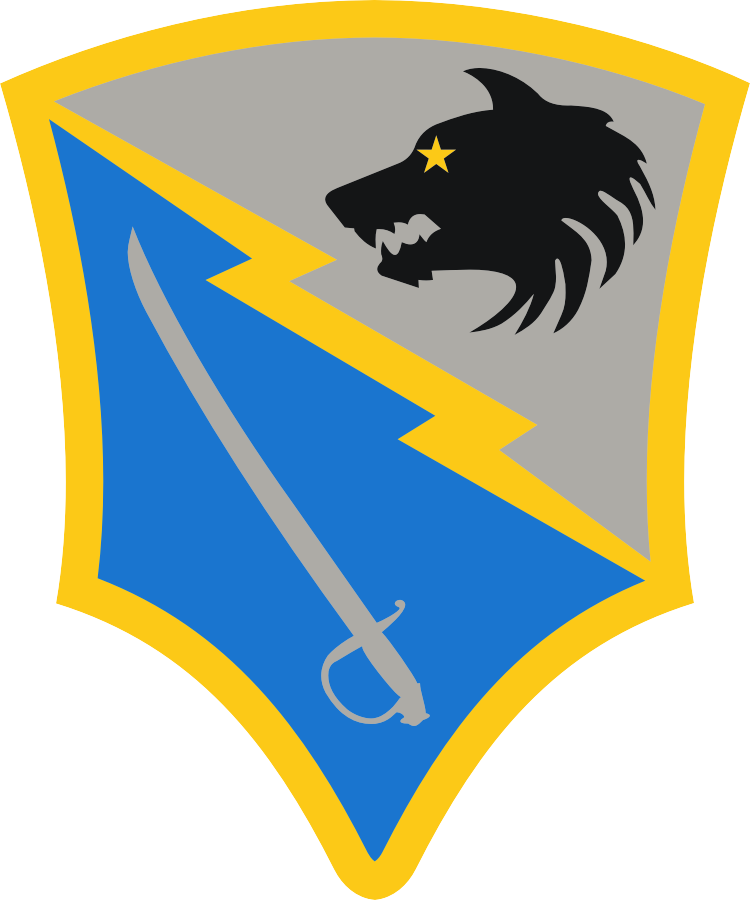
297th Battlefield Surveillance Brigade is now the 297th Regional Support Group

525th Battlefield Surveillance Brigade (Is Now 525th Military Intelligence Brigade)

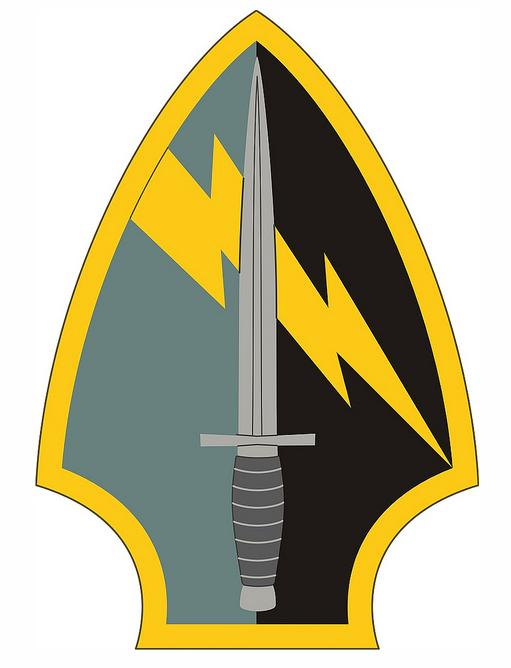
560th Battlefield Surveillance Brigade

== Cavalry Brigades ==
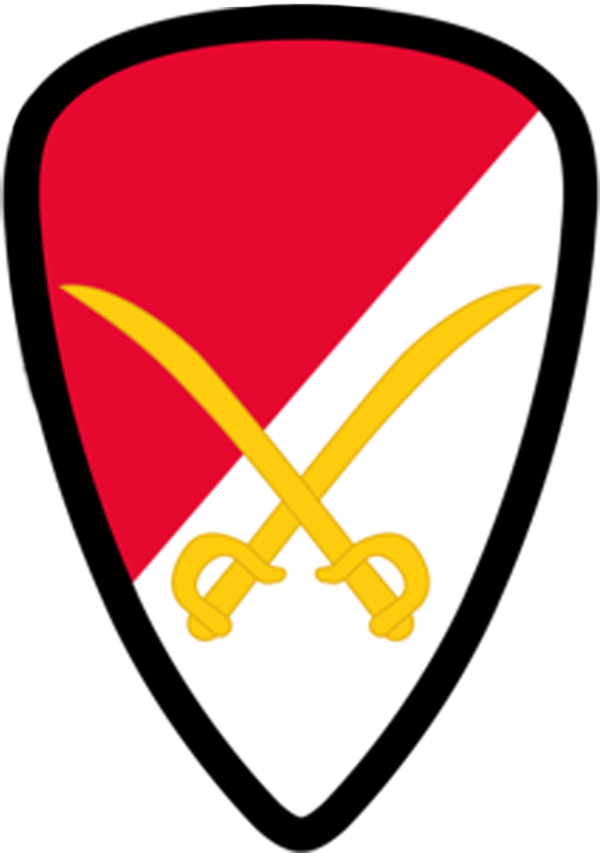
6th Cavalry Brigade

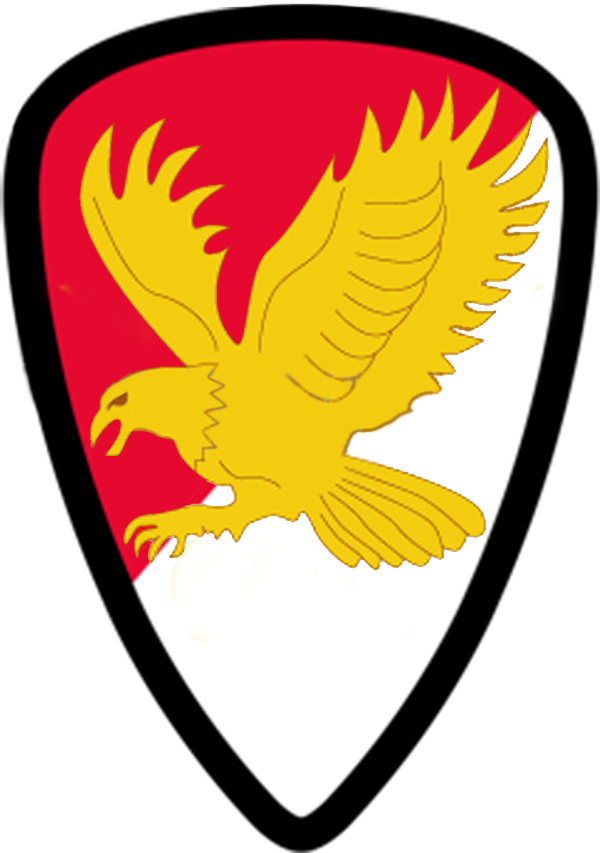
21st Cavalry Brigade

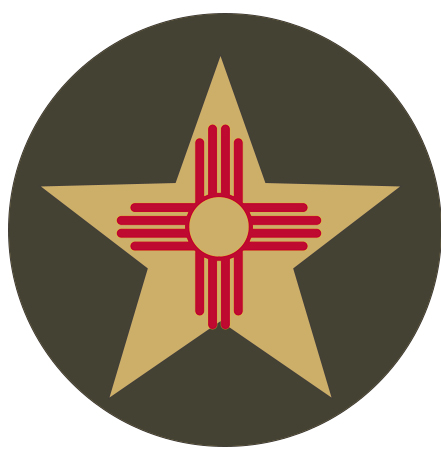
56th Cavalry Brigade

116th Cavalry Brigade

316th Cavalry Brigade

== Chemical Brigades ==
3rd Chemical Brigade

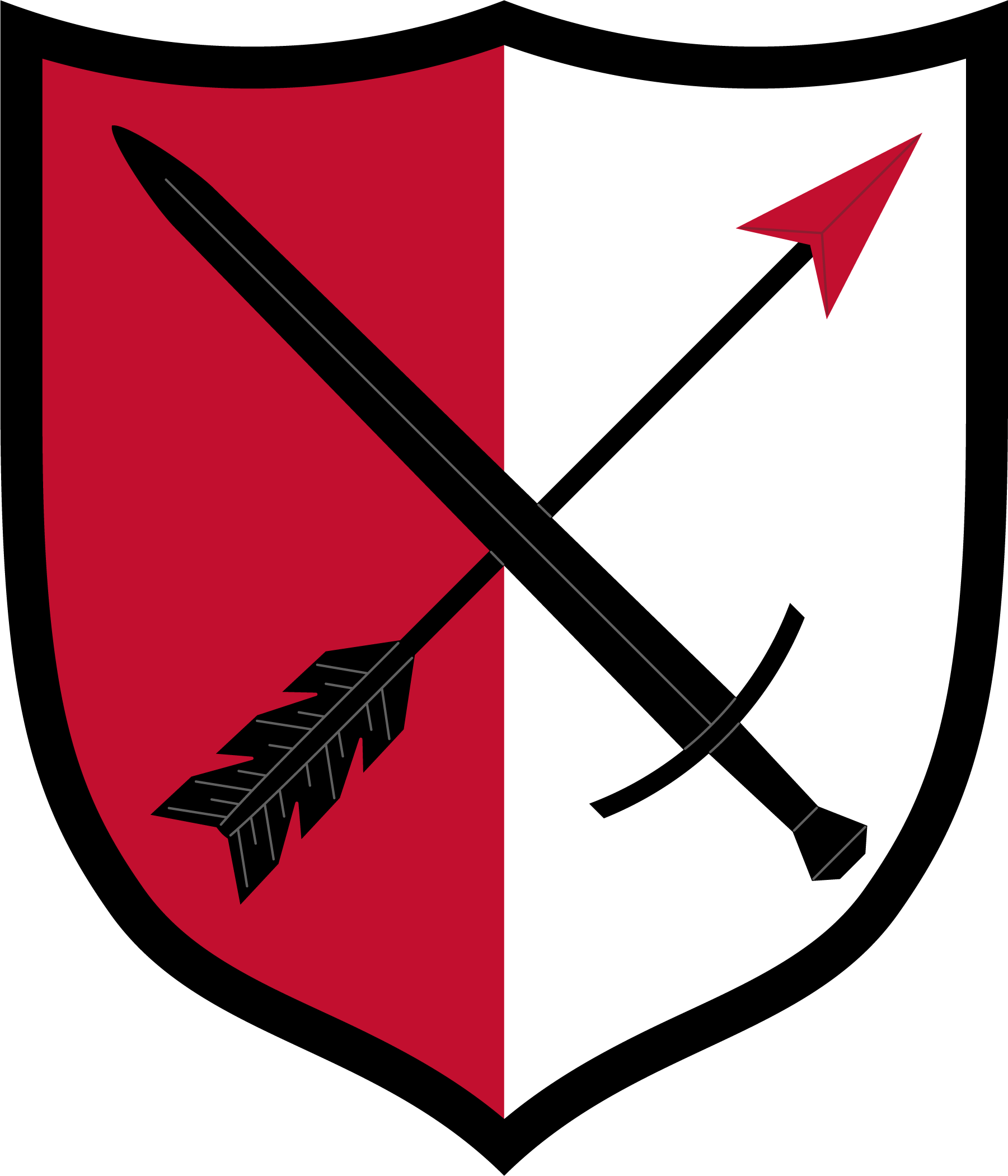
31st Chemical Brigade

48th Chemical Brigade

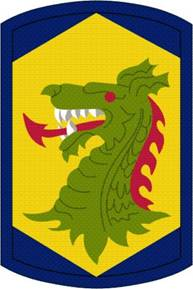
404th Chemical Brigade
Now is the 404th Maneuver Enhancement Brigade

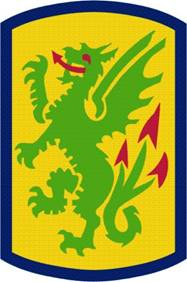
415th Chemical Brigade

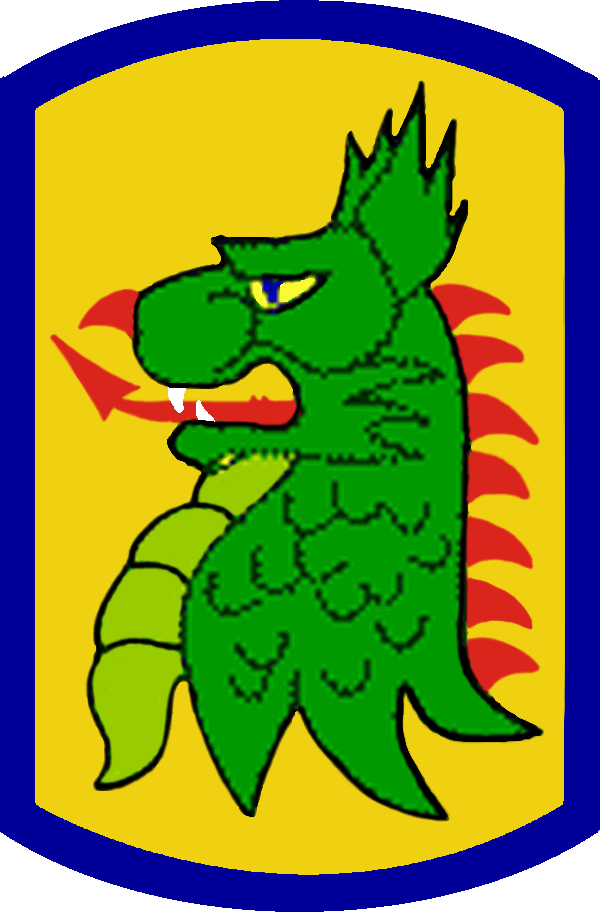
455th Chemical Brigade

460th Chemical Brigade

464th Chemical Brigade

== Civil affairs Brigades ==
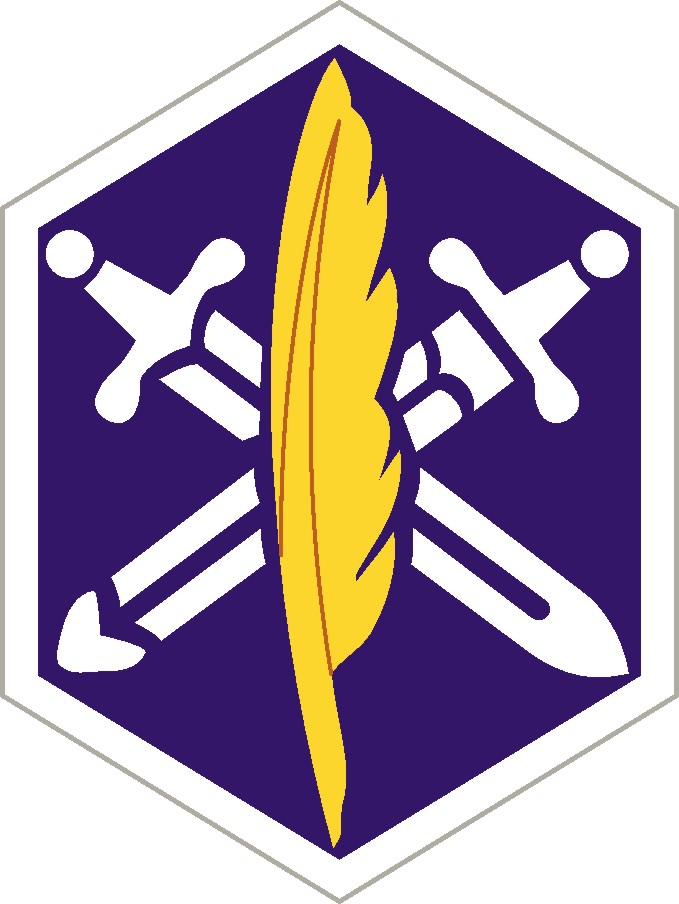
85th Civil Affairs Brigade
(Formerly 362nd Civil Affairs Brigade)

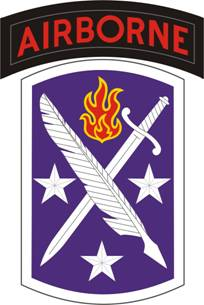
95th Civil Affairs Brigade

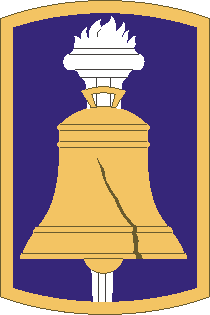
304th Civil Affairs Brigade

308th Civil Affairs Brigade

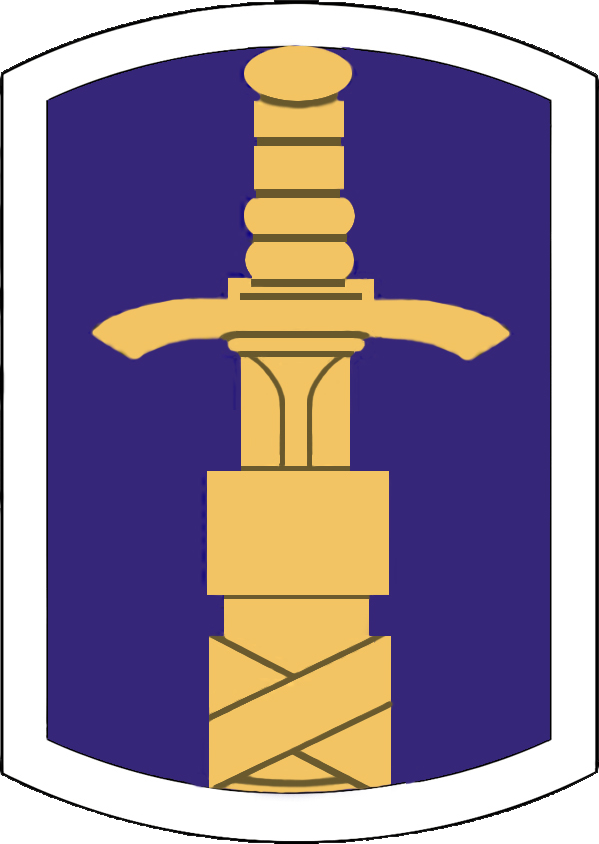
321st Civil Affairs Brigade

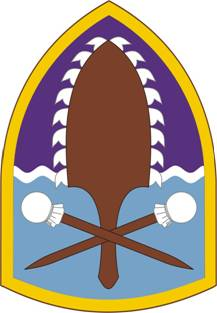
322nd Civil Affairs Brigade

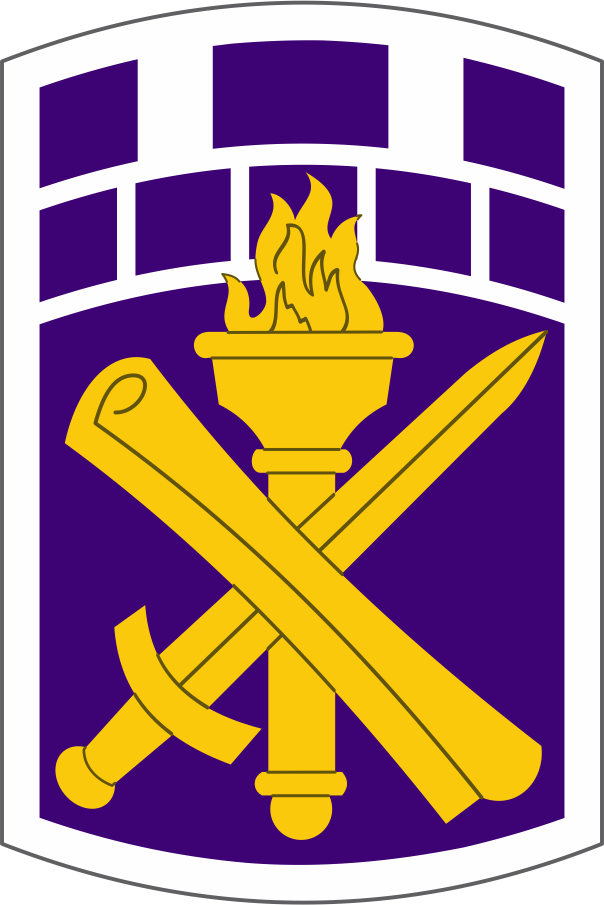
351st Civil Affairs Brigade

353rd Civil Affairs Brigade

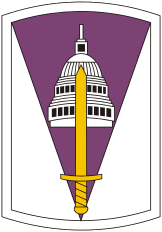
354th Civil Affairs Brigade

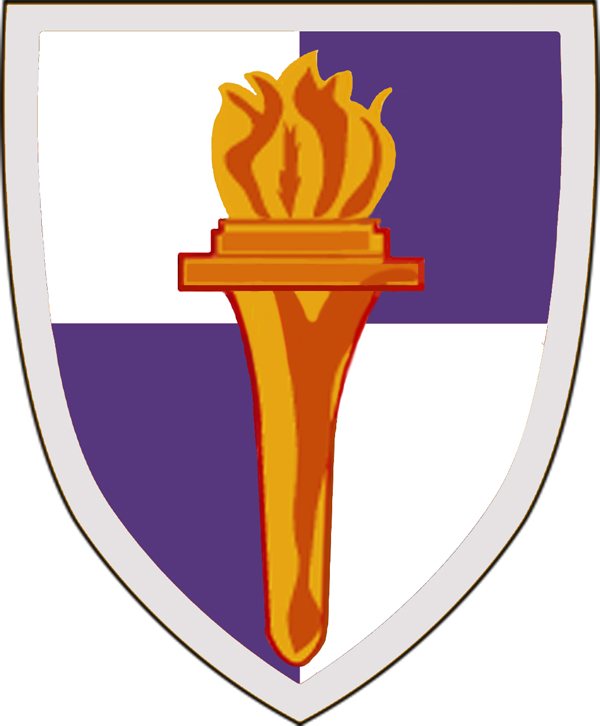
356th Civil Affairs Brigade

357th Civil Affairs Brigade

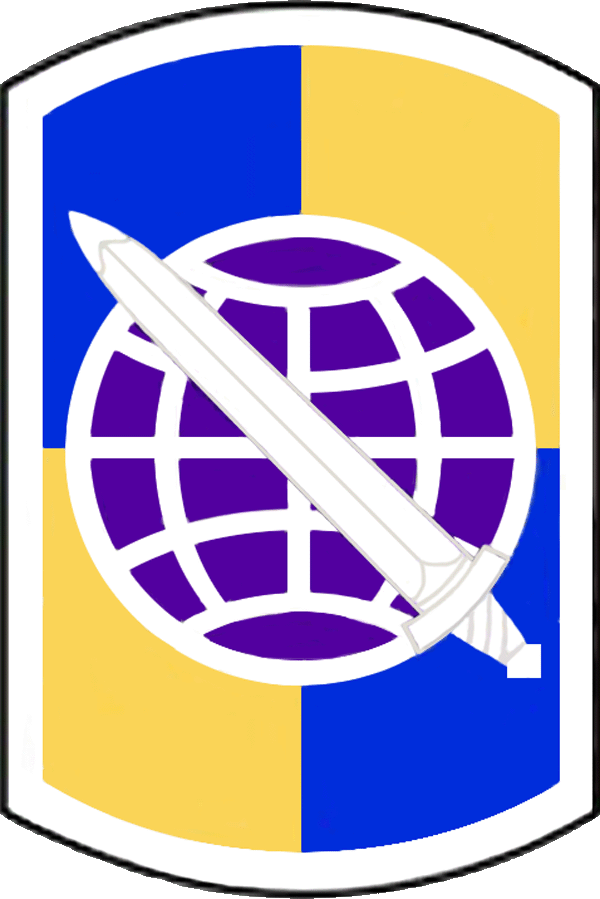
358th Civil Affairs Brigade

360th Civil Affairs Brigade

361st Civil Affairs Brigade

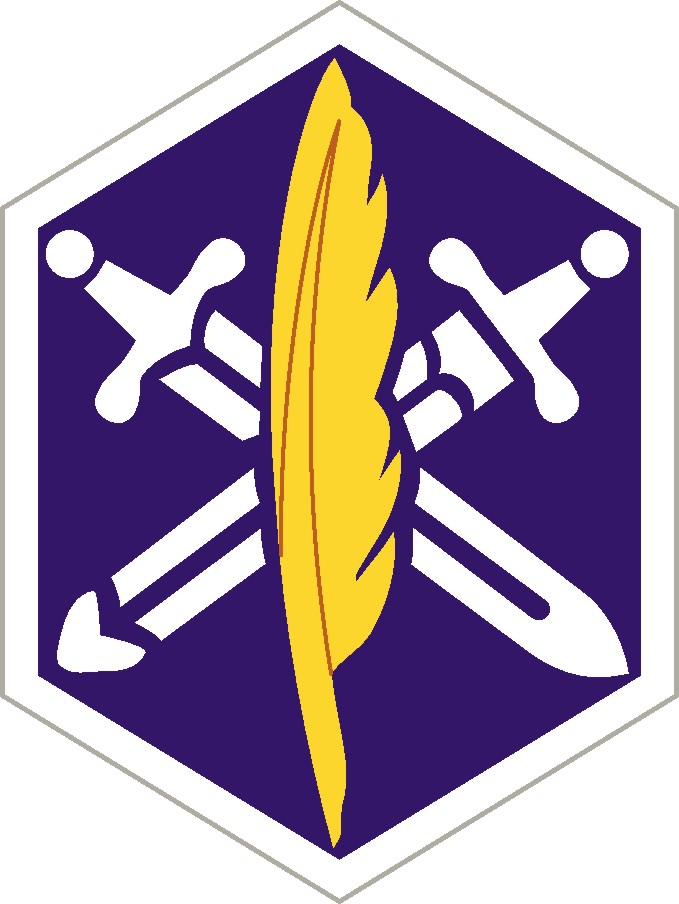
362nd Civil Affairs Brigade is now the 85th Civil Affairs Brigade

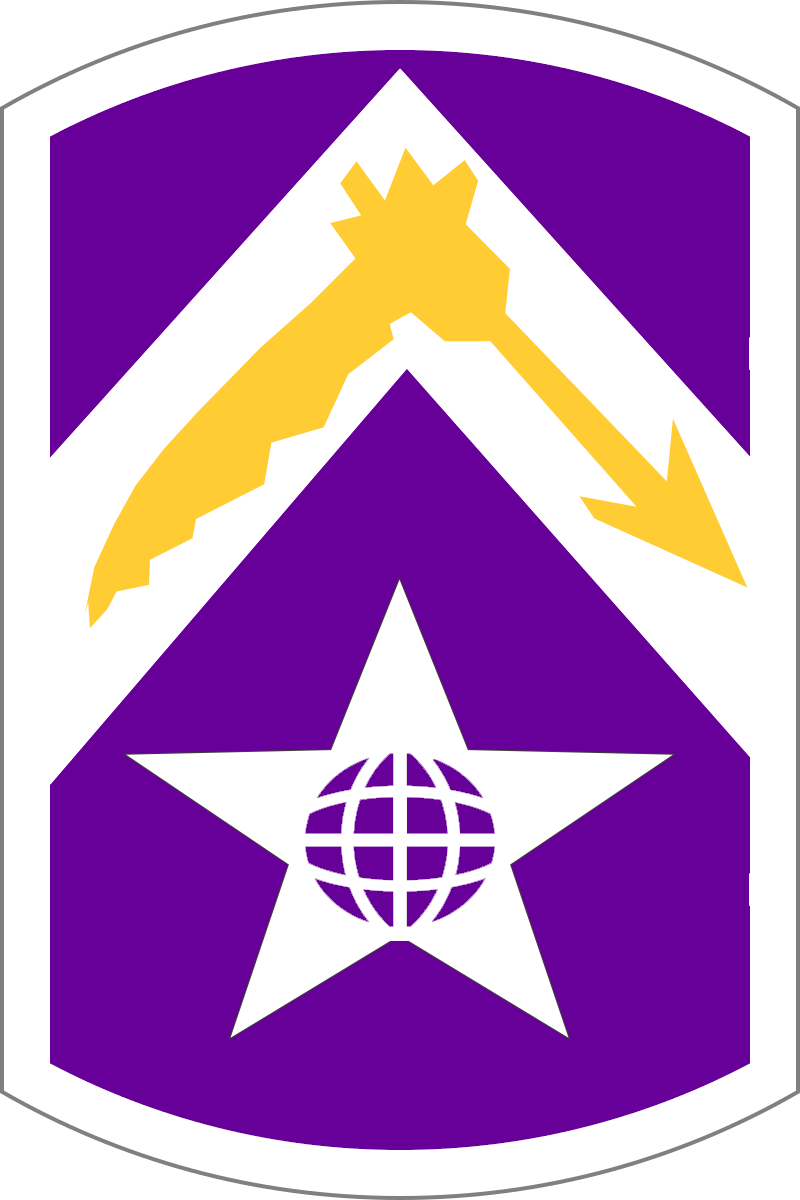
363rd Civil Affairs Brigade

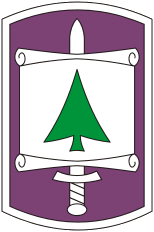
364th Civil Affairs Brigade

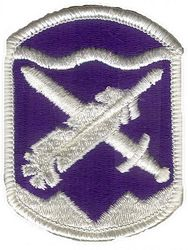
365th Civil Affairs Brigade

== Engineer Brigades ==
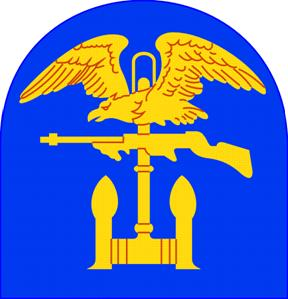
1st Engineer Brigade

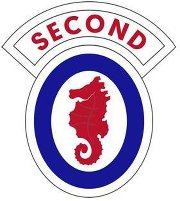
2d Engineer Brigade

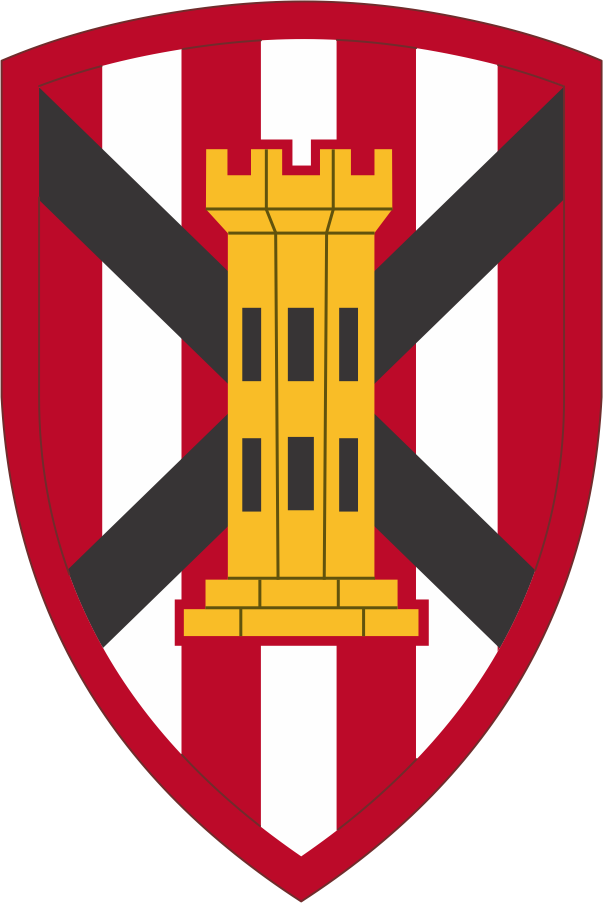
7th Engineer Brigade

16th Engineer Brigade

18th Engineer Brigade

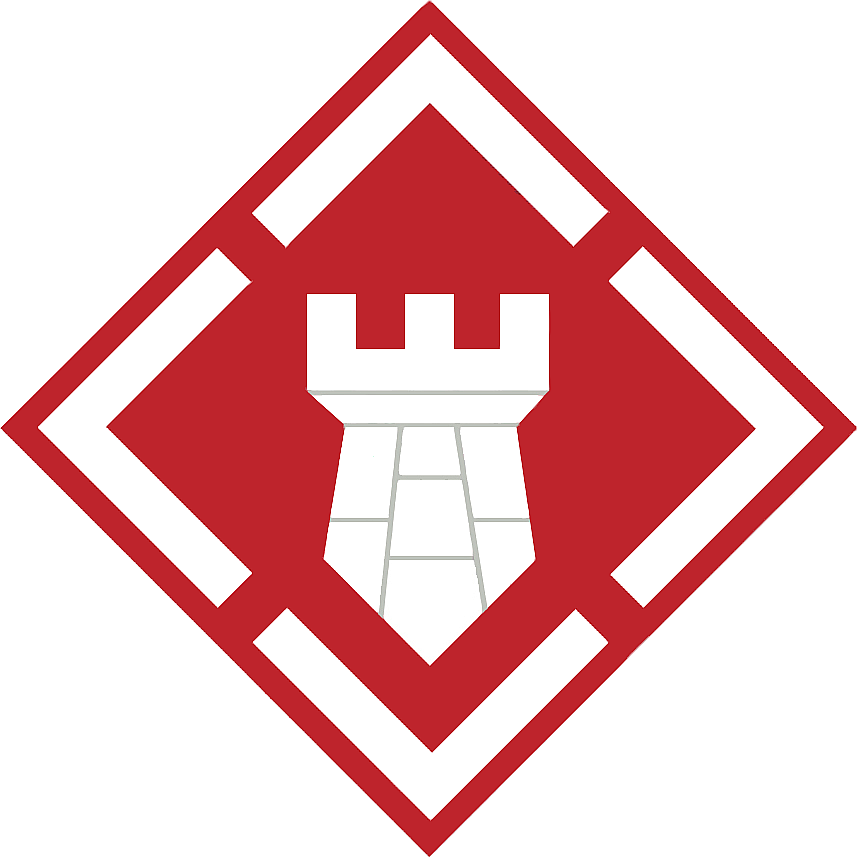
20th Engineer Brigade

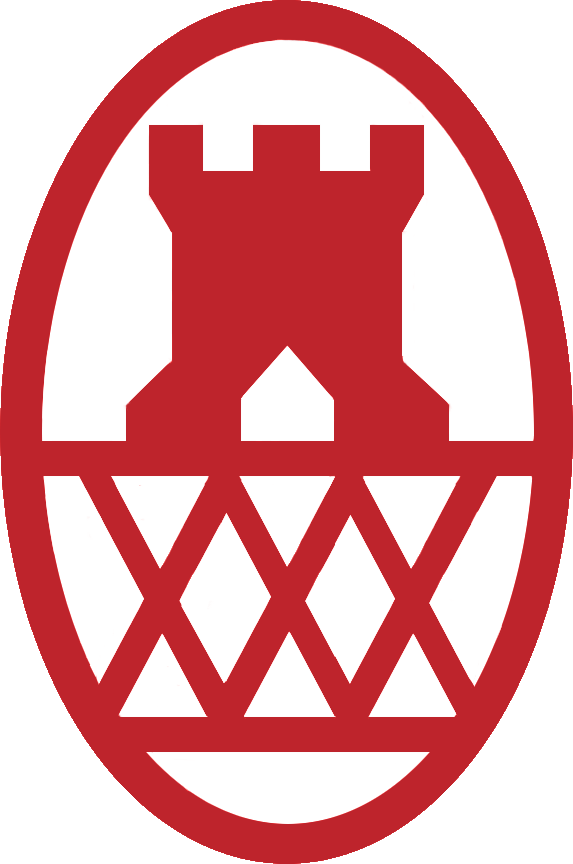
30th Engineer Brigade is now the 130th Maneuver Enhancement Brigade

35th Engineer Brigade

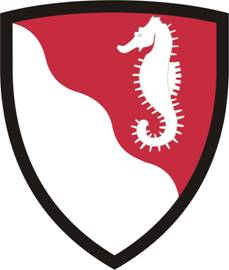
36th Engineer Brigade

111th Engineer Brigade

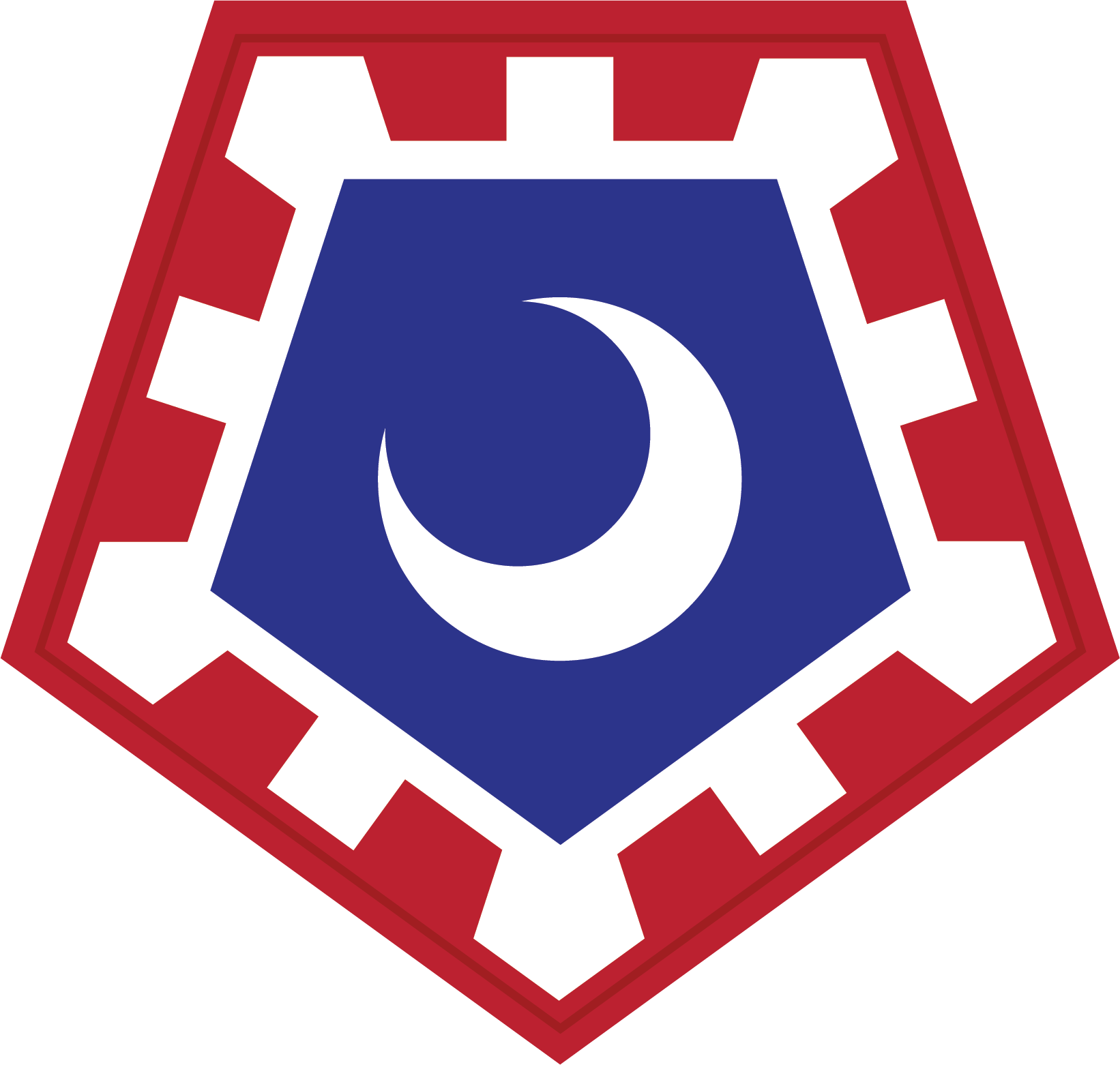
117th Engineer Brigade

130th Engineer Brigade

168th Engineer Brigade

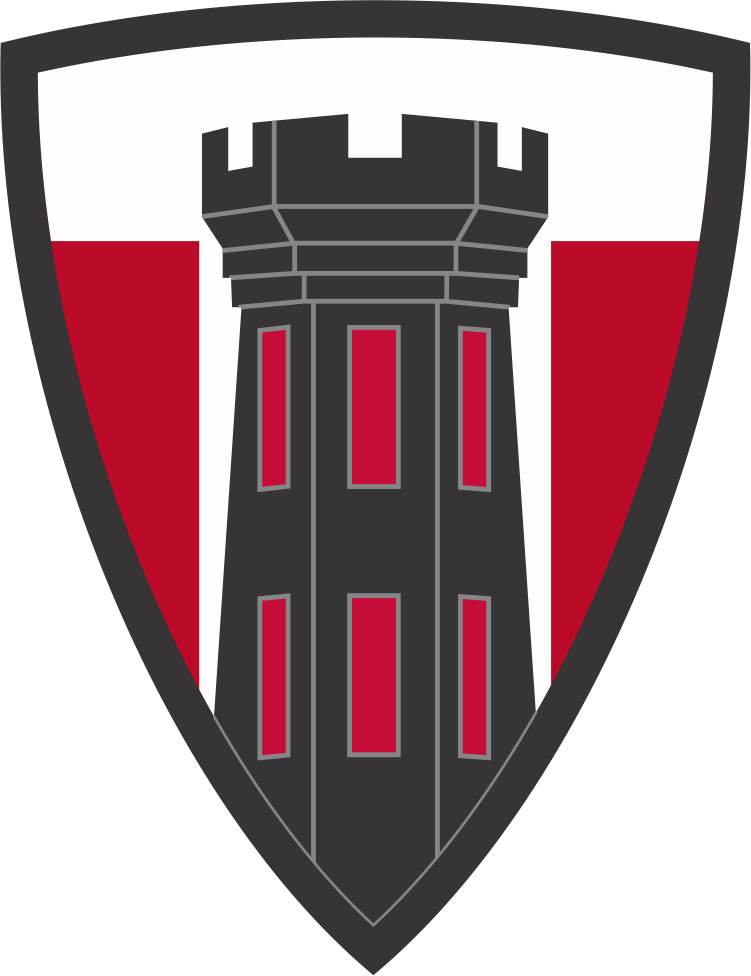
176th Engineer Brigade

194th Engineer Brigade

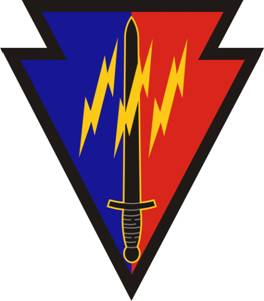
219th Engineer Brigade Formerly the 219th Battle Surveillance Brigade

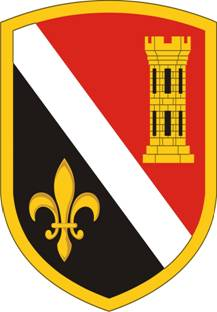
225th Engineer Brigade

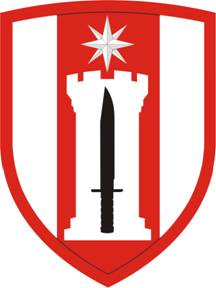
372nd Engineer Brigade

411th Engineer Brigade

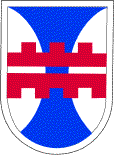
412th Engineer Brigade Now the 412th Engineer Command

420th Engineer Brigade

555th Engineer Brigade

926th Engineer Brigade

== Field artillery/fires Brigades ==
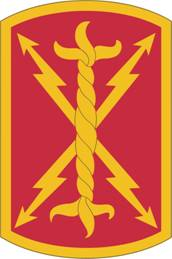
17th Field Artillery Brigade

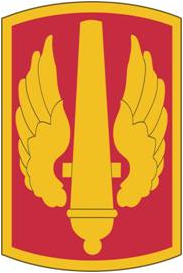
18th Field Artillery Brigade

41st Field Artillery Brigade

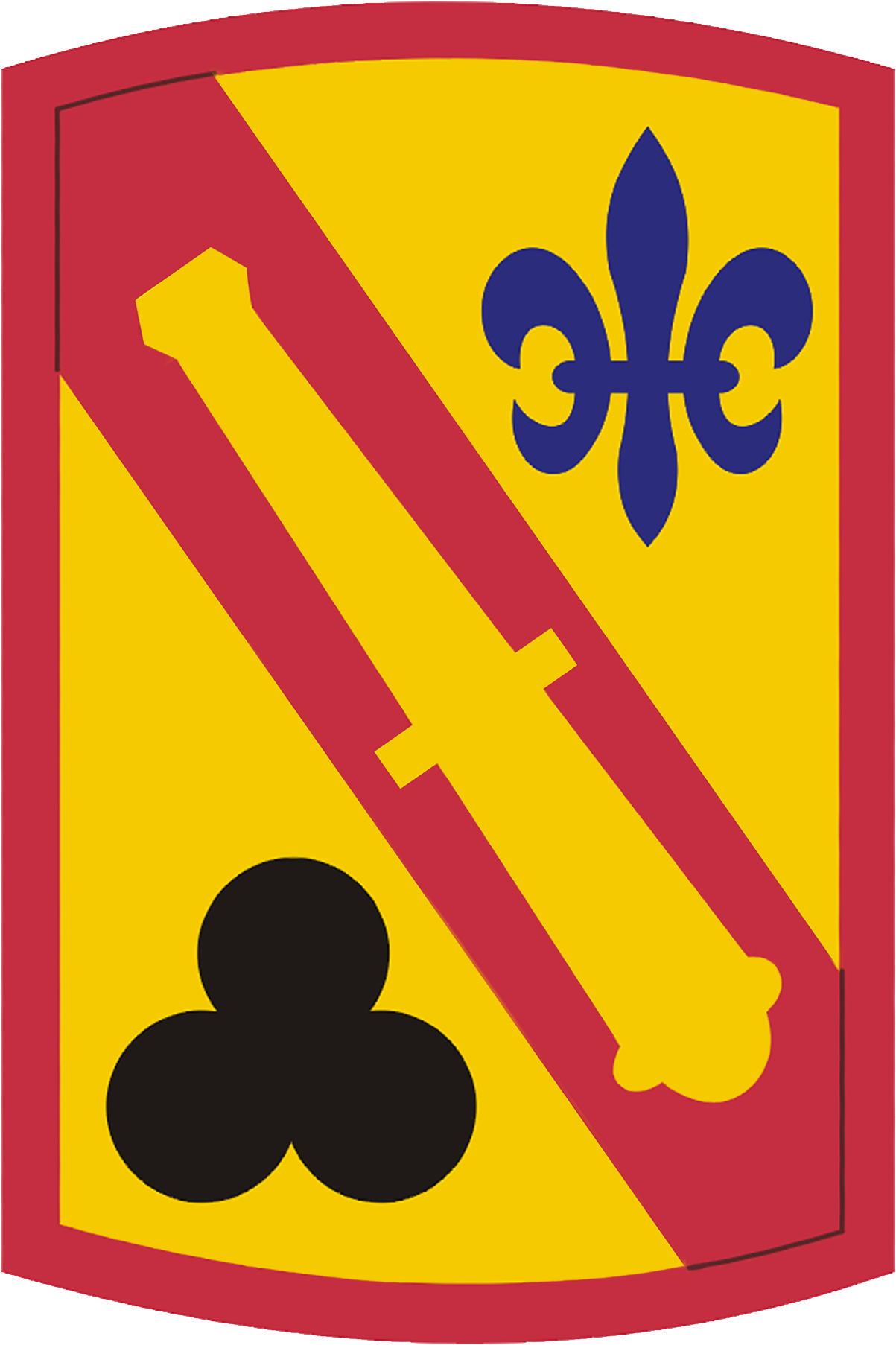
42nd Field Artillery Brigade

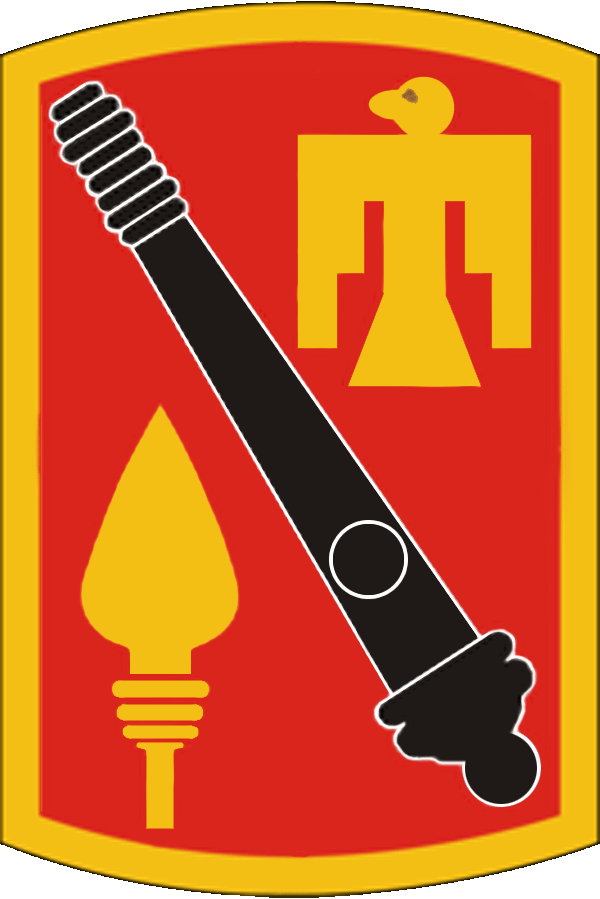
45th Fires Brigade

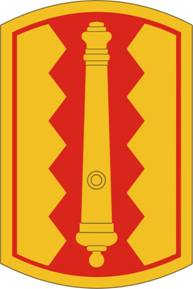
54th Field Artillery Brigade

57th Field Artillery Brigade
Now is the 157th Maneuver Enhancement Brigade

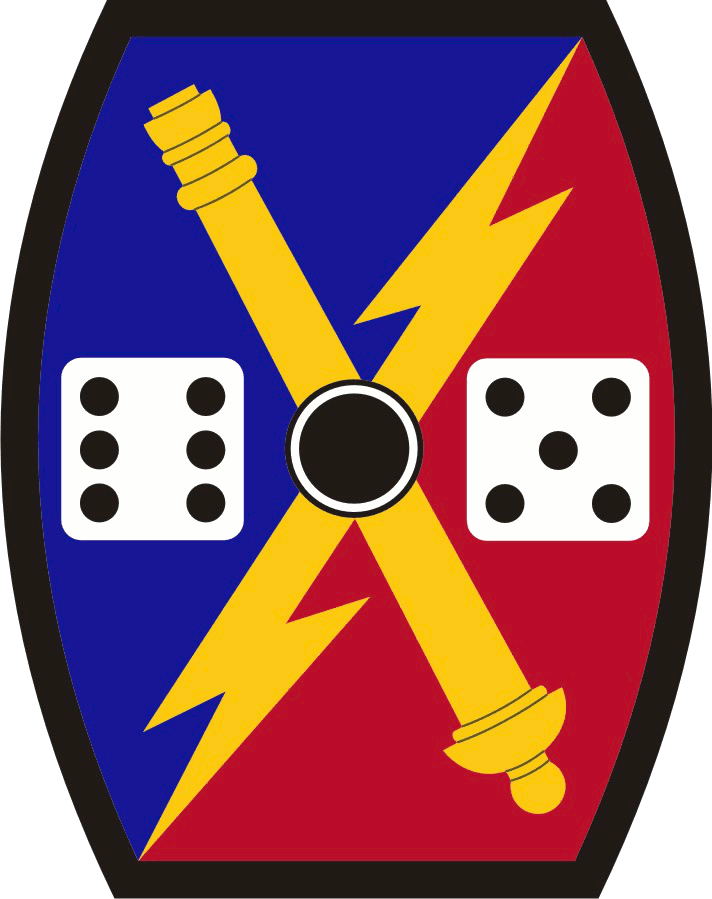
65th Field Artillery Brigade

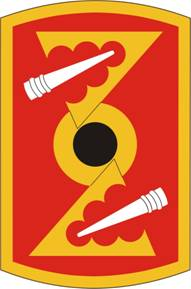
72nd Field Artillery Brigade

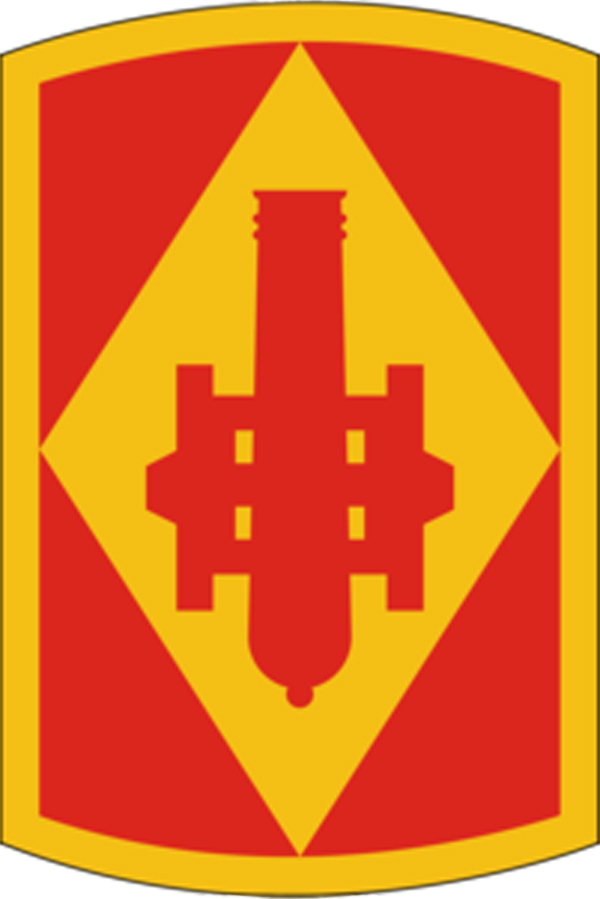
75th Field Artillery Brigade

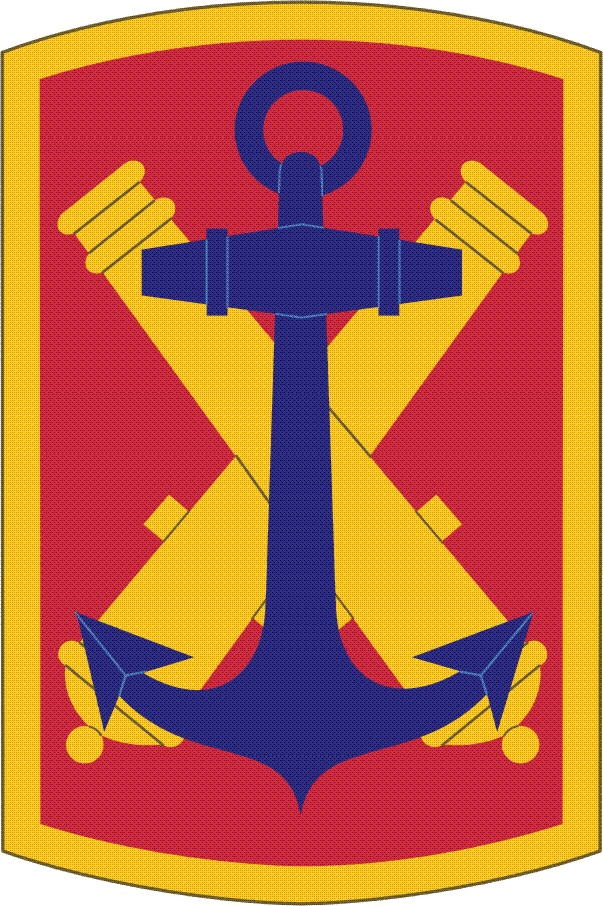
103rd Field Artillery Brigade

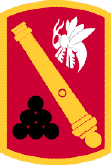
113th Field Artillery Brigade

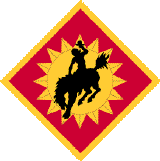
115th Field Artillery Brigade

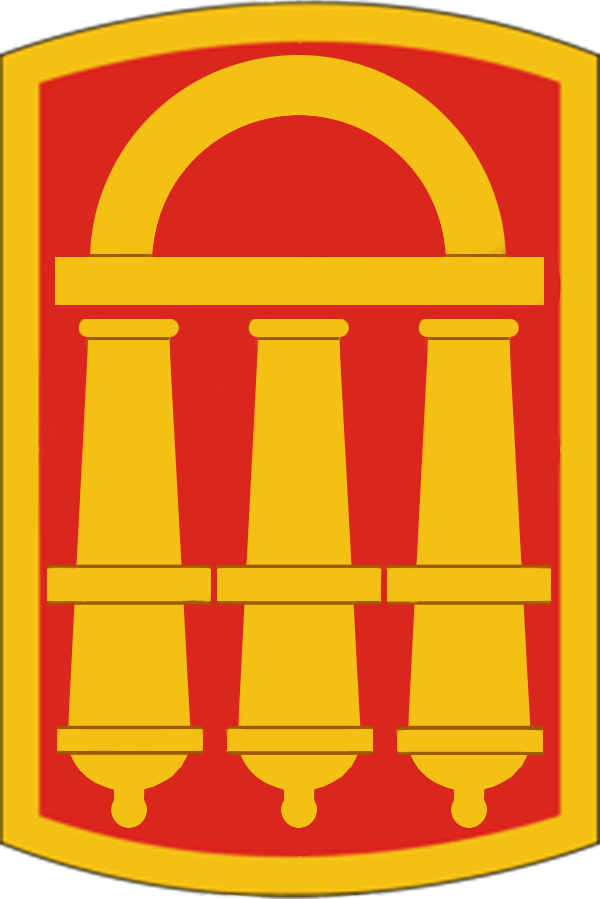
118th Field Artillery Brigade

130th Field Artillery Brigade

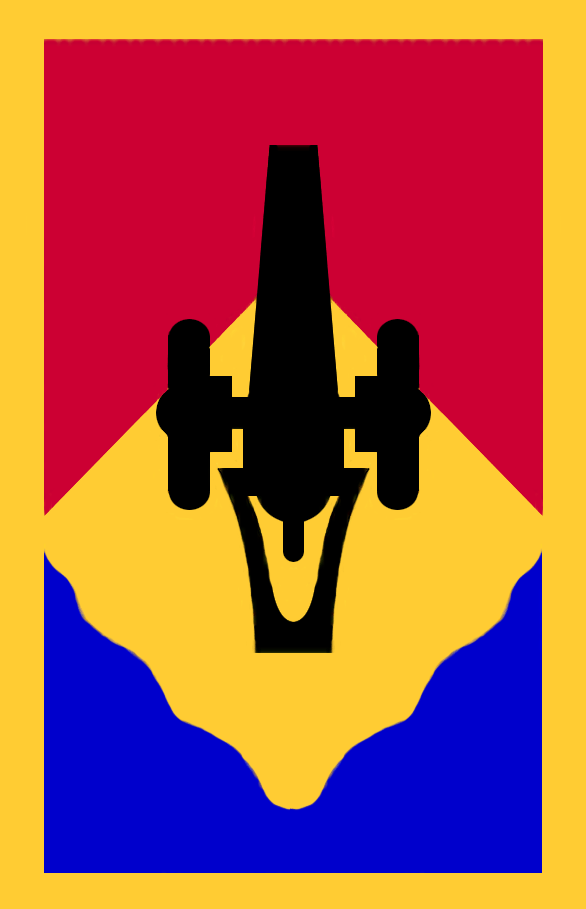
135th Field Artillery Brigade

138th Field Artillery Brigade

142nd Field Artillery Brigade

147th Field Artillery Brigade is now the 196th Maneuver Enhancement Brigade

151st Field Artillery Brigade

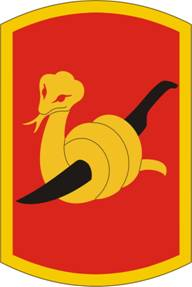
153rd Field Artillery Brigade

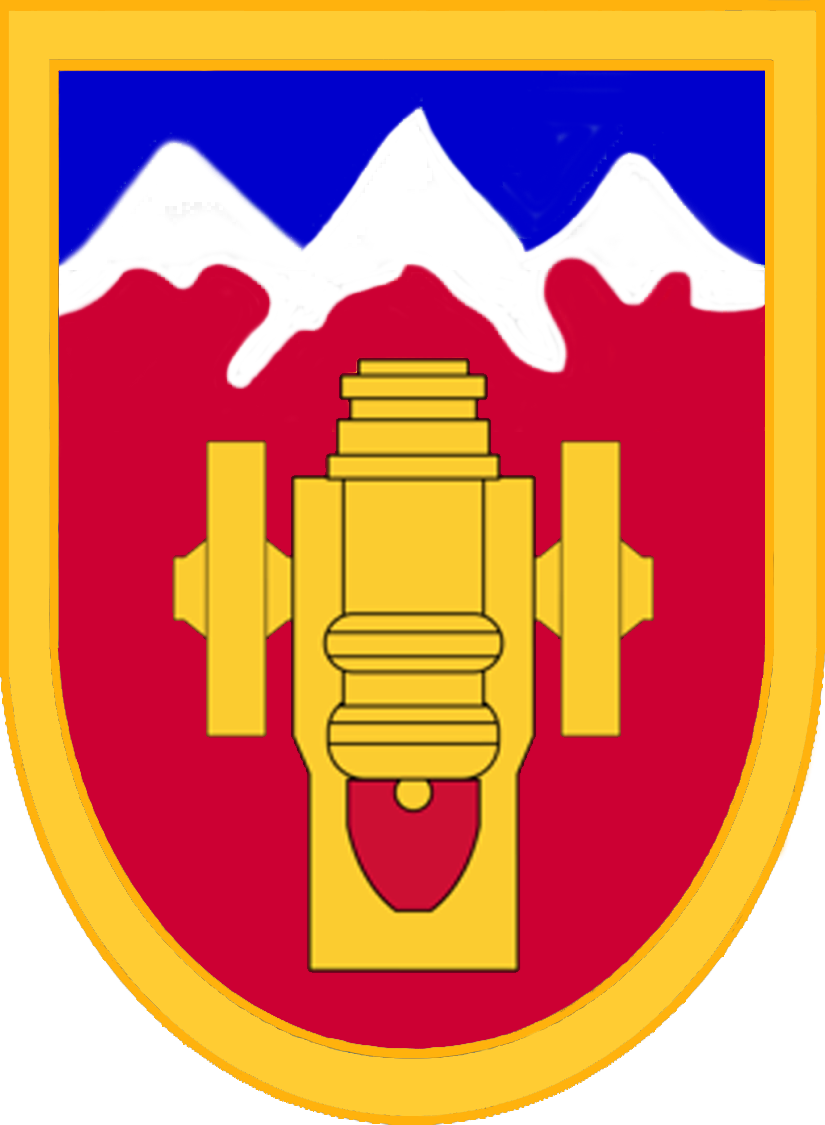
169th Field Artillery Brigade

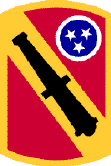
196th Field Artillery Brigade is now the 230th Sustainment Brigade

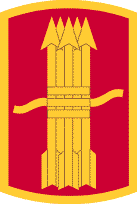
197th Field Artillery Brigade

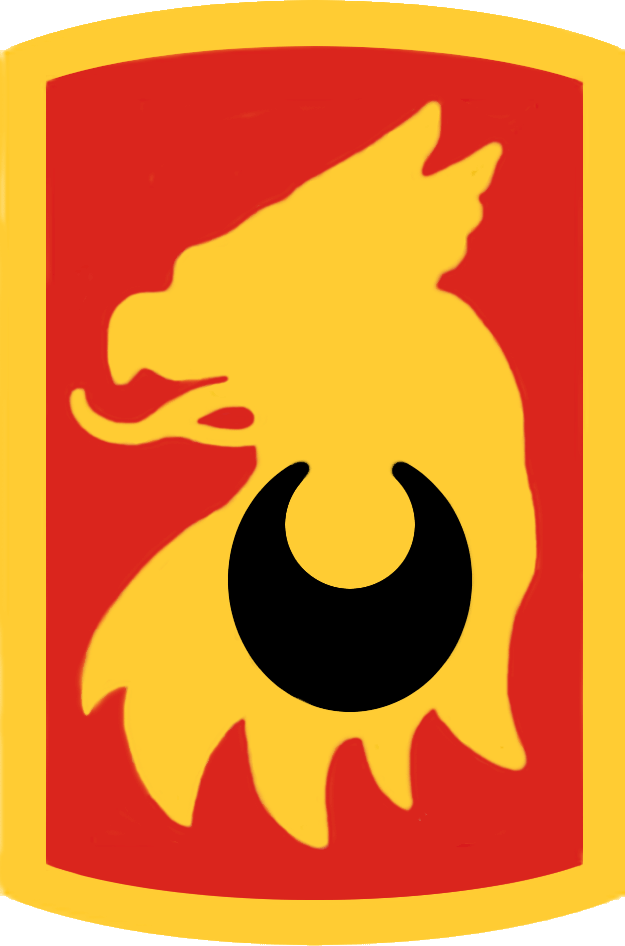
209th Field Artillery Brigade

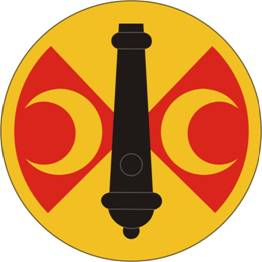
210th Field Artillery Brigade

212th Fires Brigade 1944-2014

214th Fires Brigade

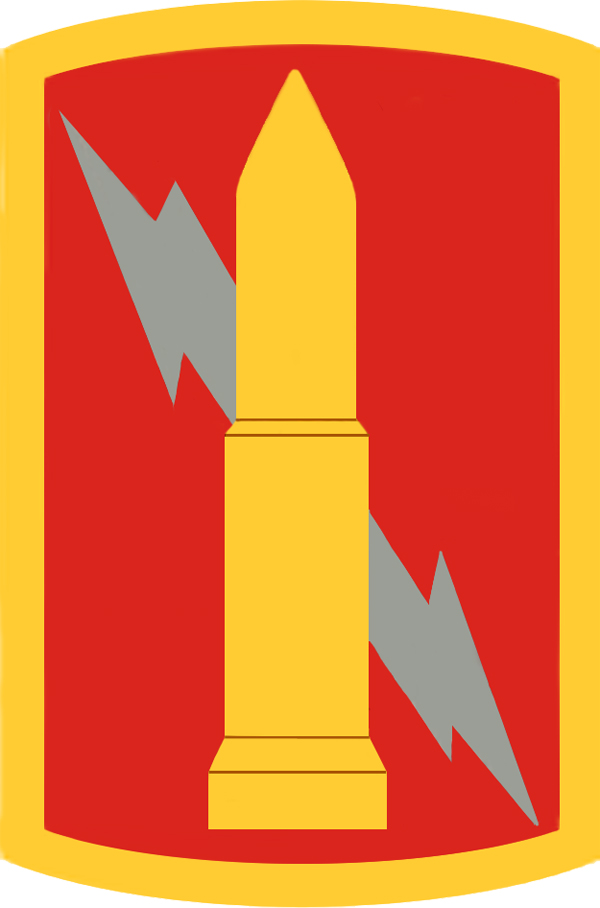
224th Field Artillery Brigade is now Headquarters and Headquarters Battery, 29th Infantry Division

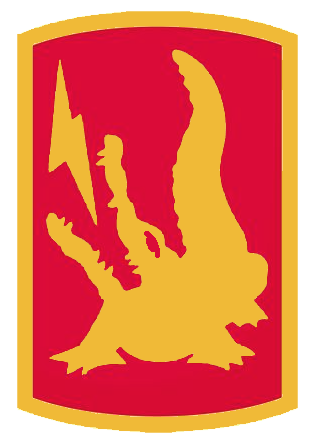
227th Field Artillery Brigade is now 50th Regional Support Group

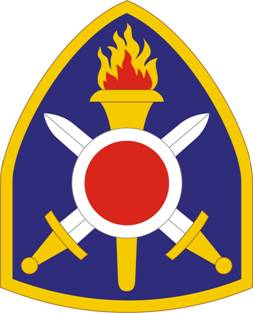
402nd Field Artillery Brigade

428th Field Artillery Brigade

434th Field Artillery Brigade

479th Field Artillery Brigade

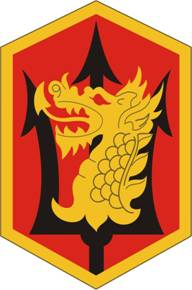
631st Field Artillery Brigade

== Infantry Brigades ==
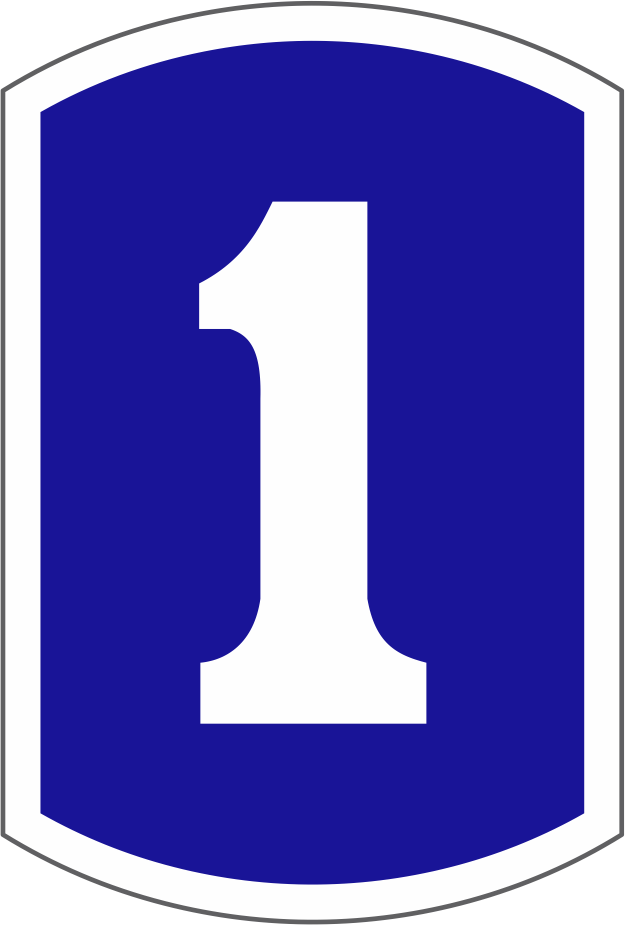
1st Infantry Brigade (insignia used 1958-1962) Now is the 1st Brigade Combat Team, 1st Infantry Division

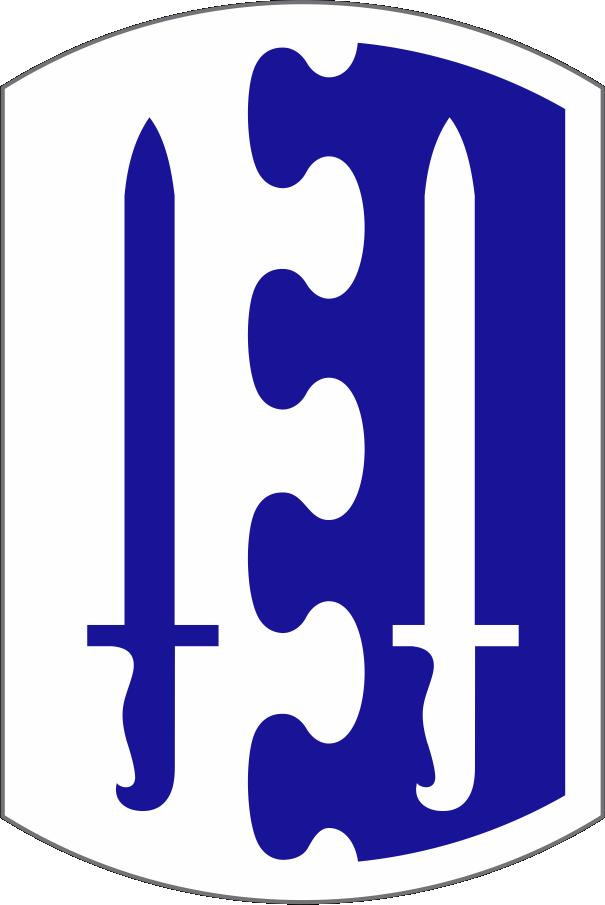
2nd Infantry Brigade (insignia used 1958-1963)
Now is the 2nd Brigade Combat Team, 1st Infantry Division

11th Infantry Brigade (1966-1985)

27th Infantry Brigade Combat Team

29th Infantry Brigade Combat Team

32nd Infantry Brigade Combat Team

33rd Infantry Brigade Combat Team

36th Infantry Brigade (1973-1980)

37th Infantry Brigade Combat Team

39th Infantry Brigade Combat Team

40th Infantry Brigade Combat Team Now is the 79th Infantry Brigade Combat Team

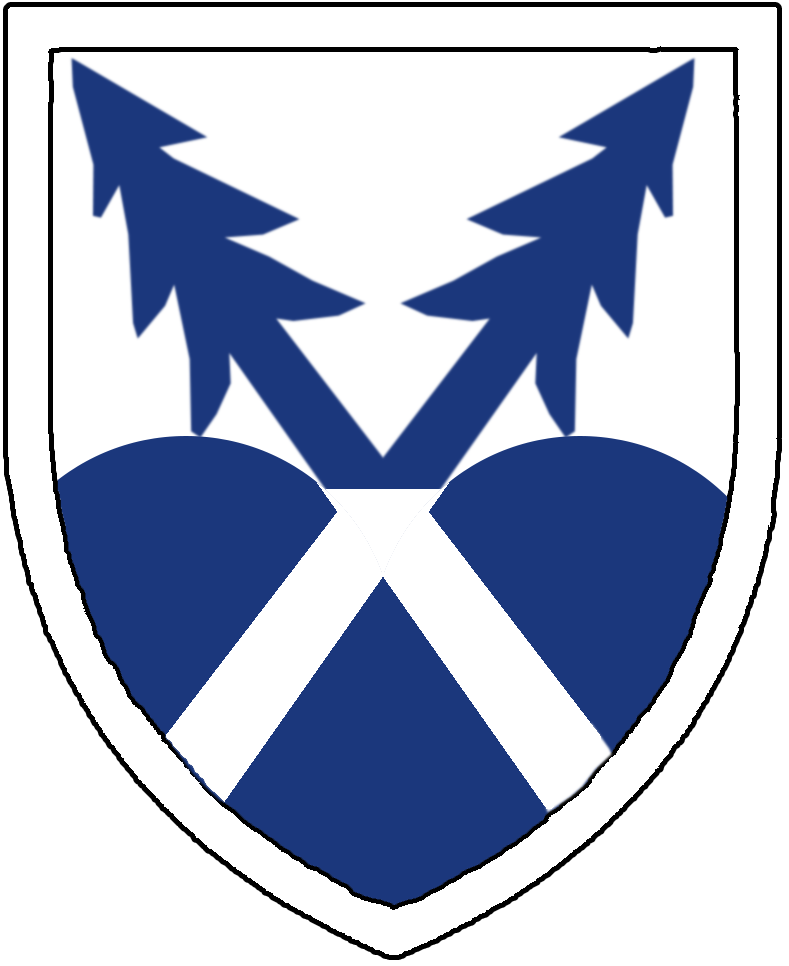
41st Infantry Brigade (1968-1974)

41st Infantry Brigade Combat Team

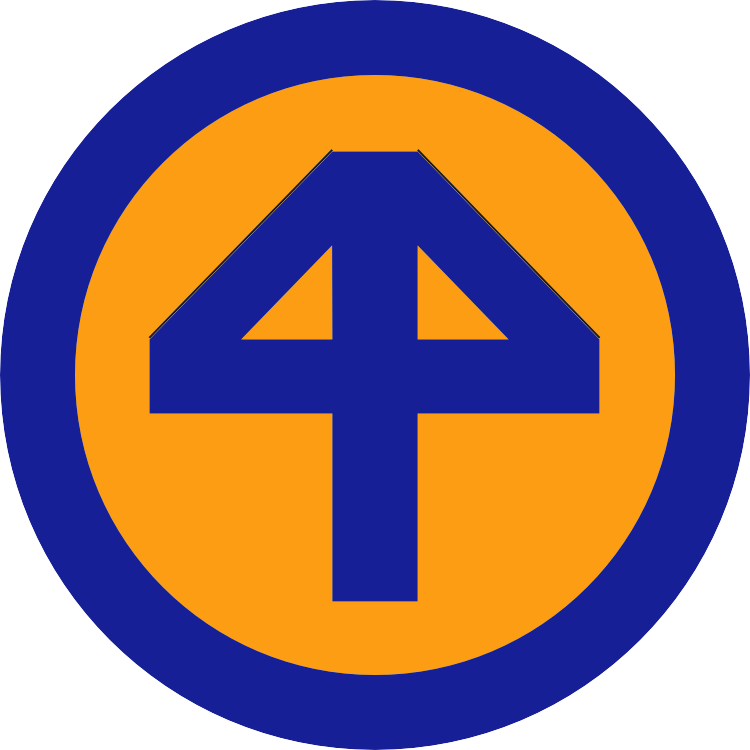
44th Infantry Brigade Combat Team

45th Infantry Brigade Combat Team

48th Infantry Brigade
Now is the 48th Infantry Brigade Combat Team

49th Infantry Brigade Now the 49th Military Police Brigade

50th Infantry Brigade Combat Team (1993-2017)

53rd Infantry Brigade Combat Team

58th Infantry Brigade Combat Team

67th Infantry Brigade
Now is the 67th Battlefield Surveillance Brigade

69th Infantry Brigade (1917-1997)

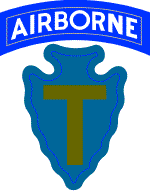
71st Airborne Brigade
Now is 1st Battalion (Airborne) of 36th Infantry Division

72nd Infantry Brigade (1973-2004)

73rd Infantry Brigade (1968-1994)

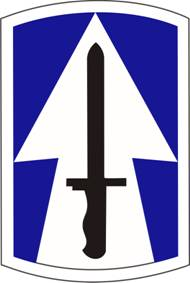
76th Infantry Brigade
Now is the 76th Infantry Brigade Combat Team (United States)

79th Infantry Brigade Combat Team (1917-1942)

81st Infantry Brigade Now is the 81st Stryker Brigade Combat Team

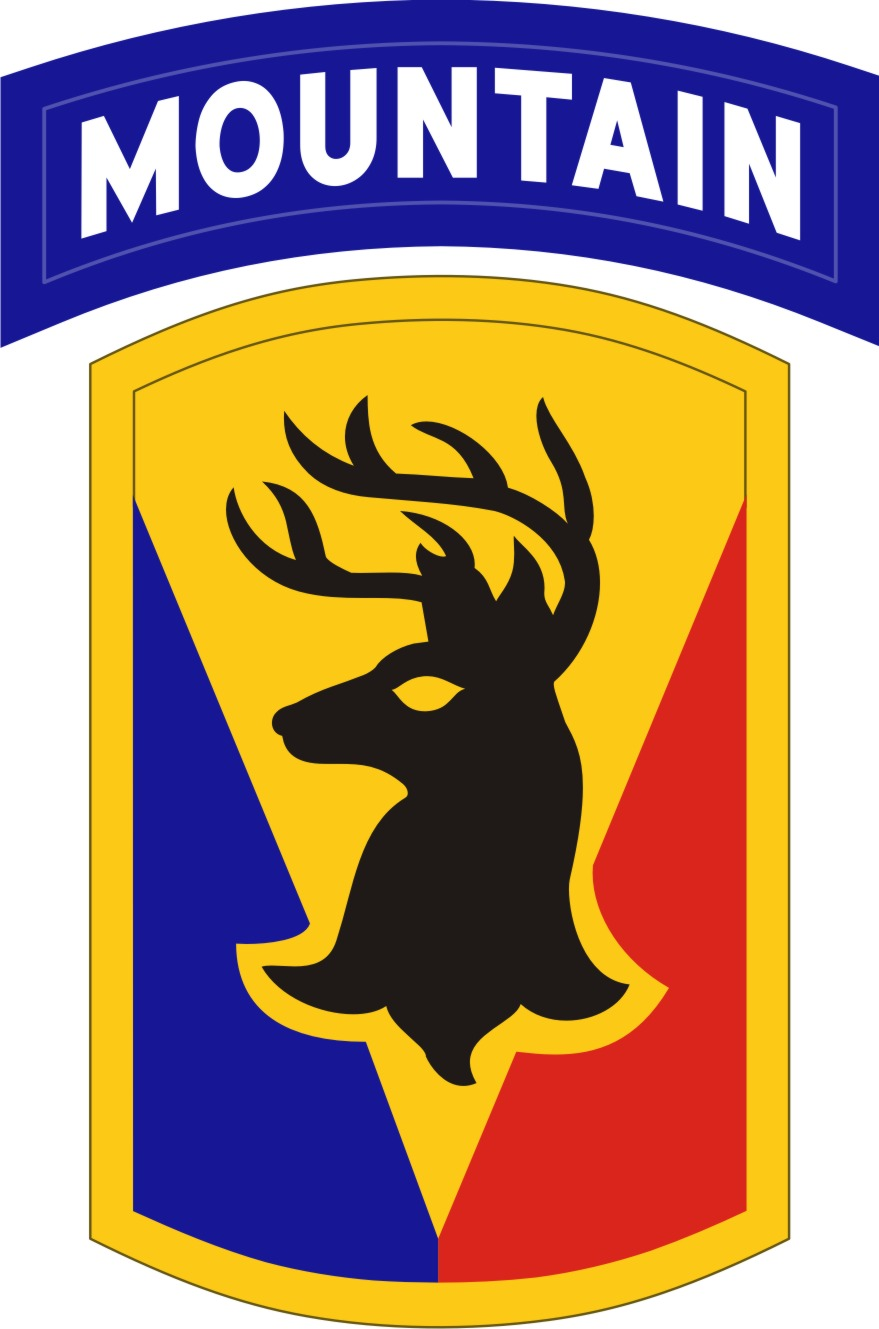
86th Infantry Brigade Combat Team (Mountain)

92nd Infantry Brigade (1959-2016) Now is the 92nd Military Police Brigade

116th Infantry Brigade (1975-2005)

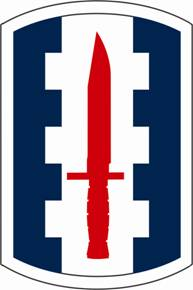
120th Infantry Brigade (1943-1999)

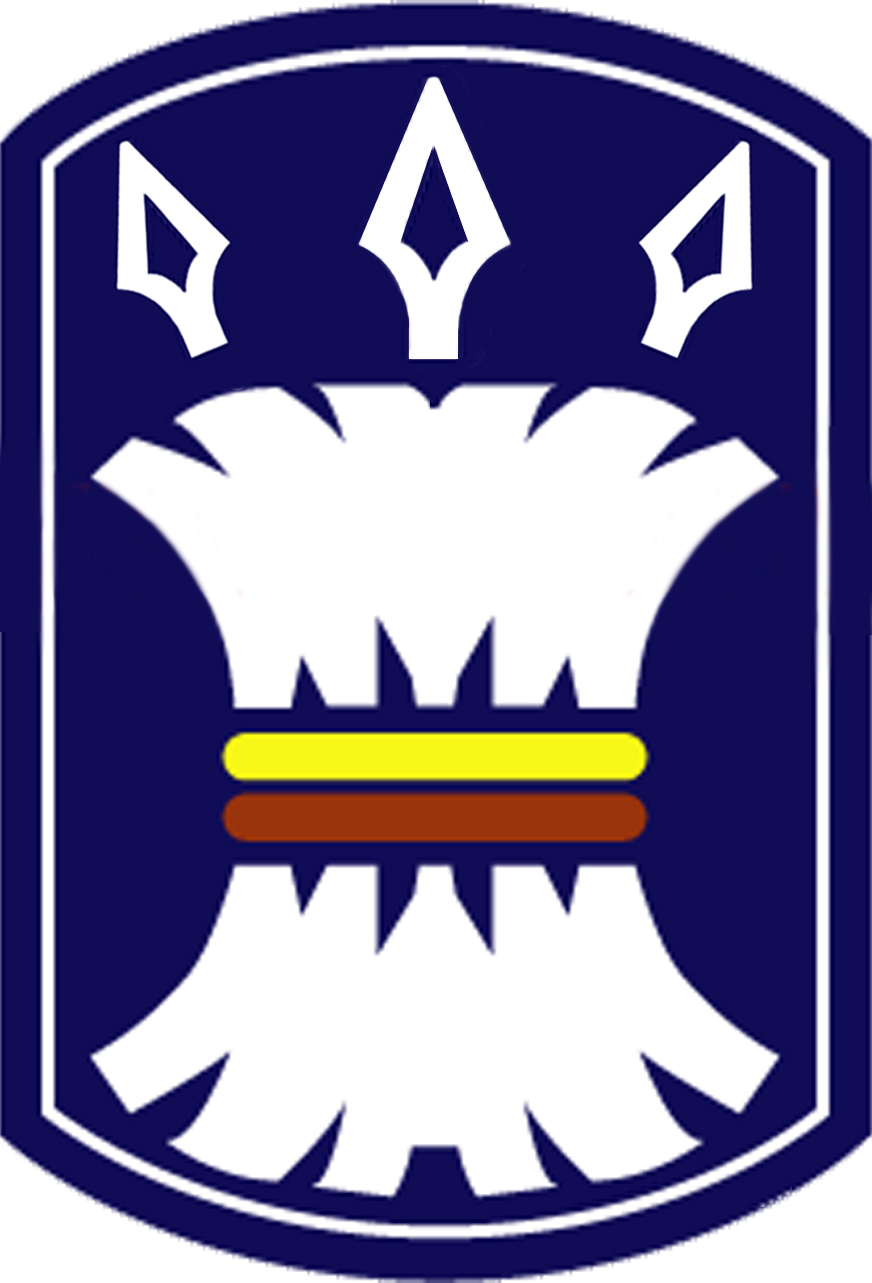
157th Infantry Brigade (1917-1995)

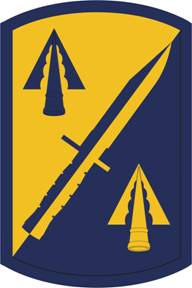
158th Infantry Brigade

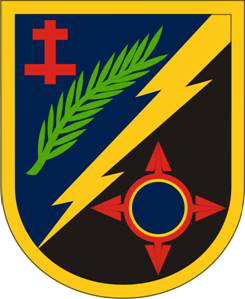
162nd Infantry Brigade (1917-1965)

165th Infantry Brigade

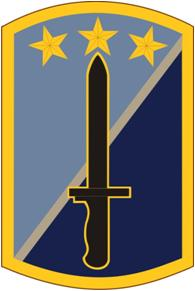
170th Infantry Brigade (1917-2012)

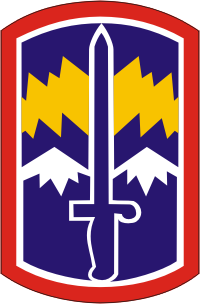
171st Infantry Brigade (1917-2016)

172nd Infantry Brigade (1917-2013)

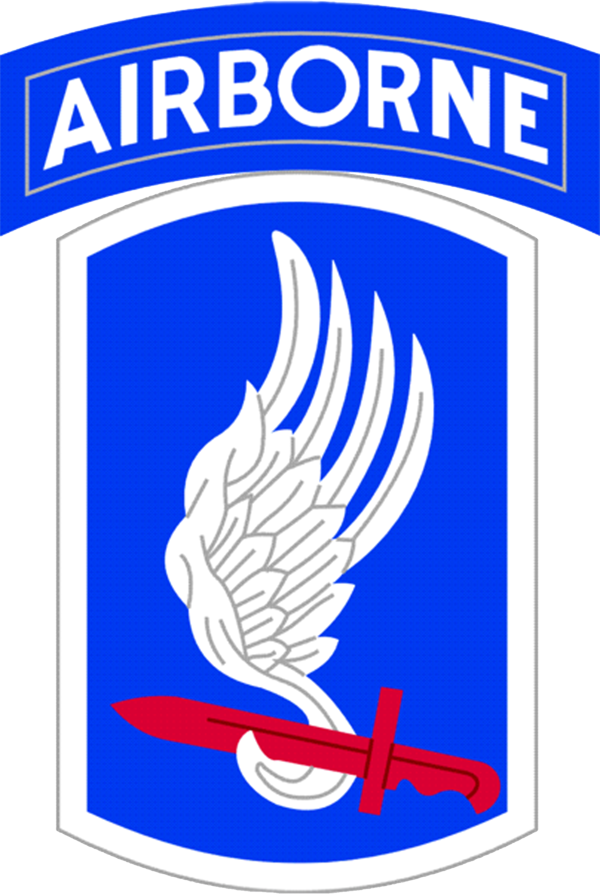
173rd Airborne Brigade

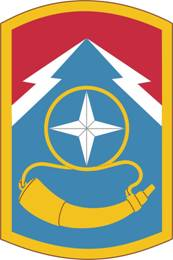
174th Infantry Brigade (1917-1999) Is Now 174th Infantry Brigade, First Army

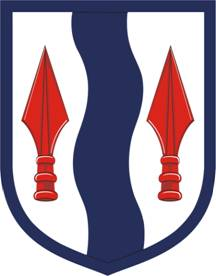
181st Infantry Brigade (1917-1965) Is Now 181st Infantry Brigade, First Army

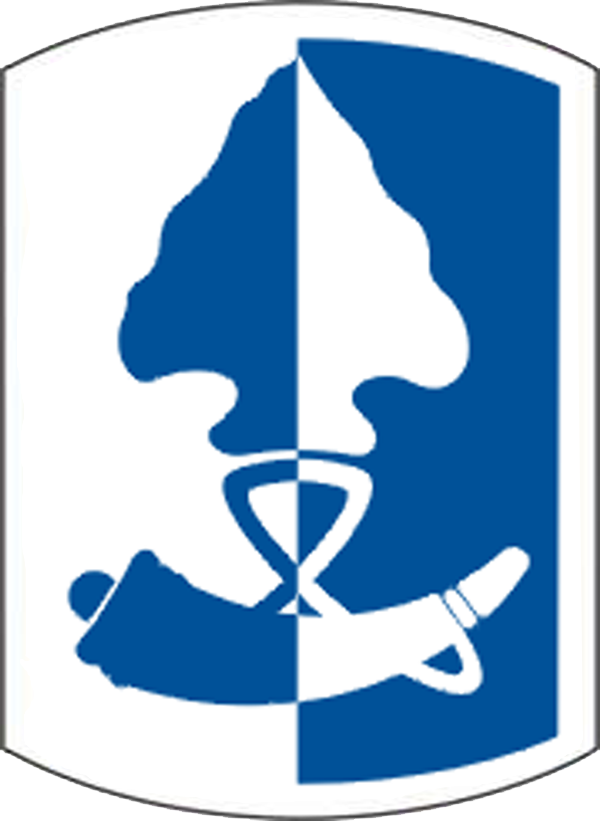
187th Infantry Brigade (1921-1994)

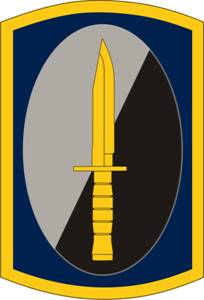
188th Infantry Brigade (1921-1999) Is Now 188th Infantry Brigade, First Army

189th Infantry Brigade (1921-1999) Is Now 189th Infantry Brigade (United States)

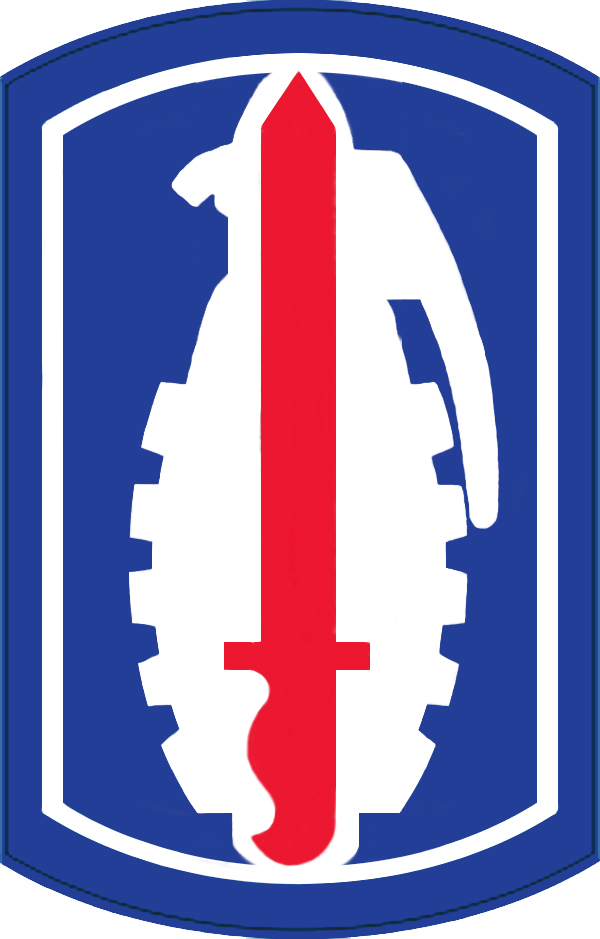
191st Infantry Brigade (1921-2014)

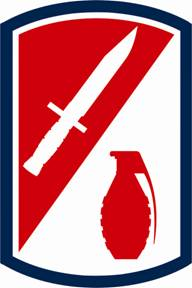
192nd Infantry Brigade (1942-2013)

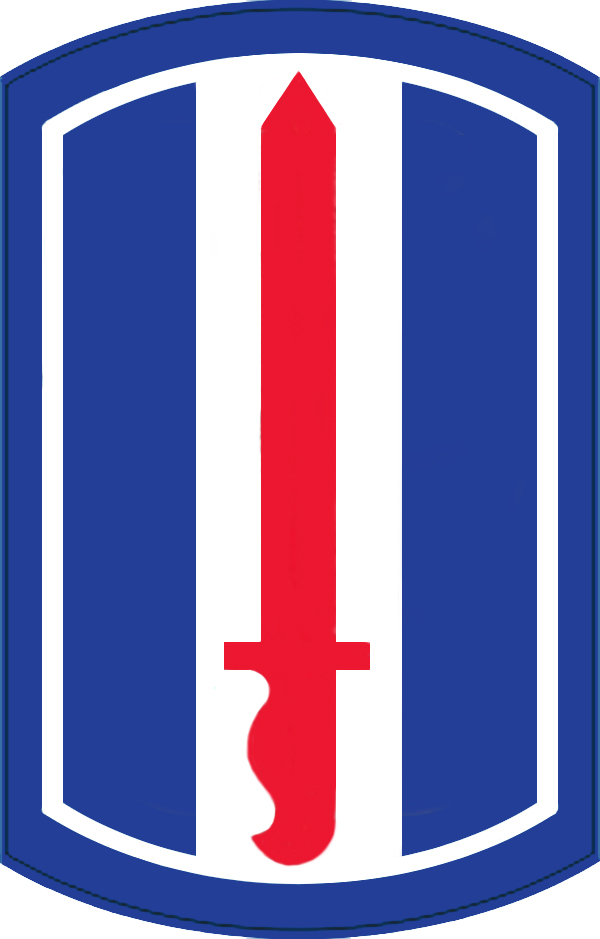
193rd Infantry Brigade

196th Infantry Brigade

197th Infantry Brigade

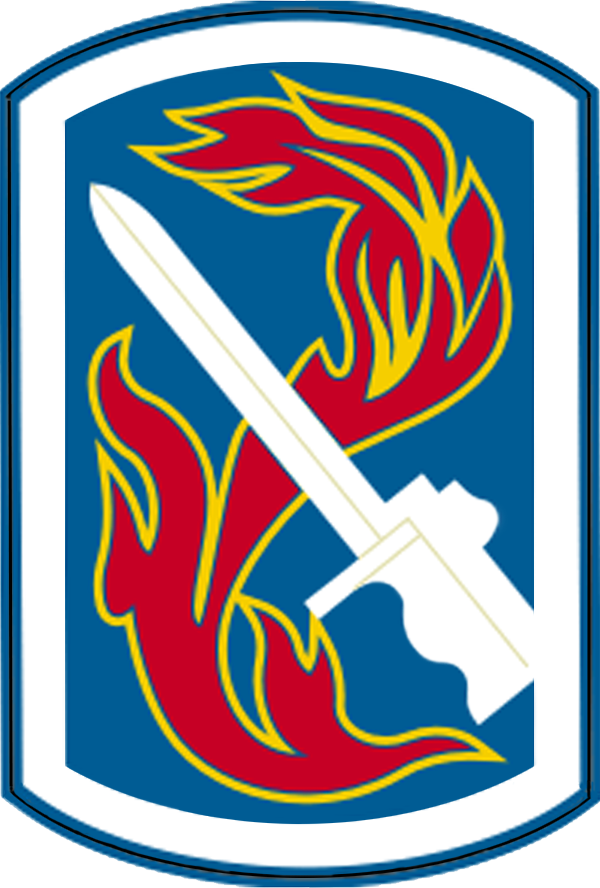
198th Infantry Brigade

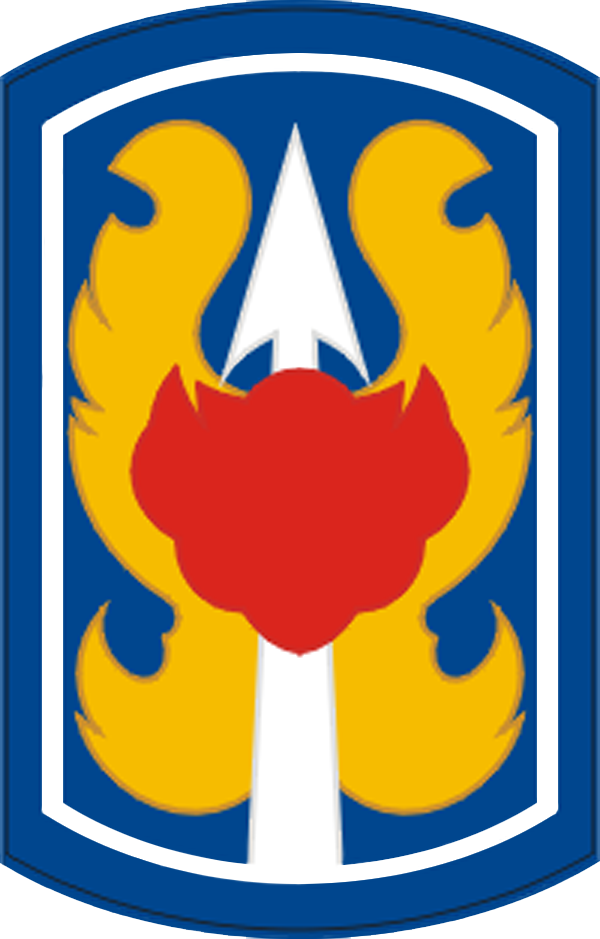
199th Infantry Brigade

205th Infantry Brigade (1921-2015)

218th Infantry Brigade (1974-2009)
Now is the 218th Maneuver Enhancement Brigade

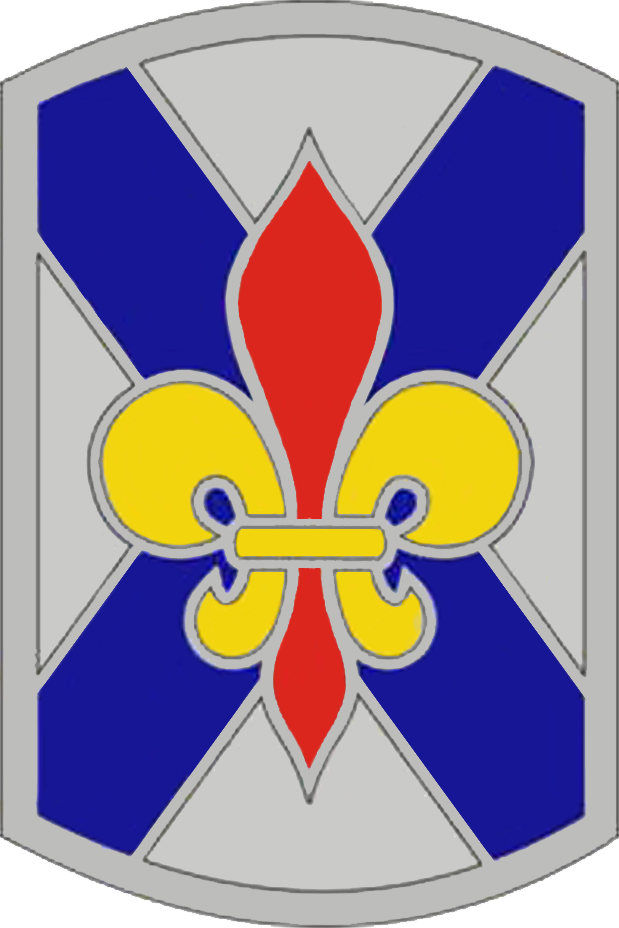
256th Infantry Brigade

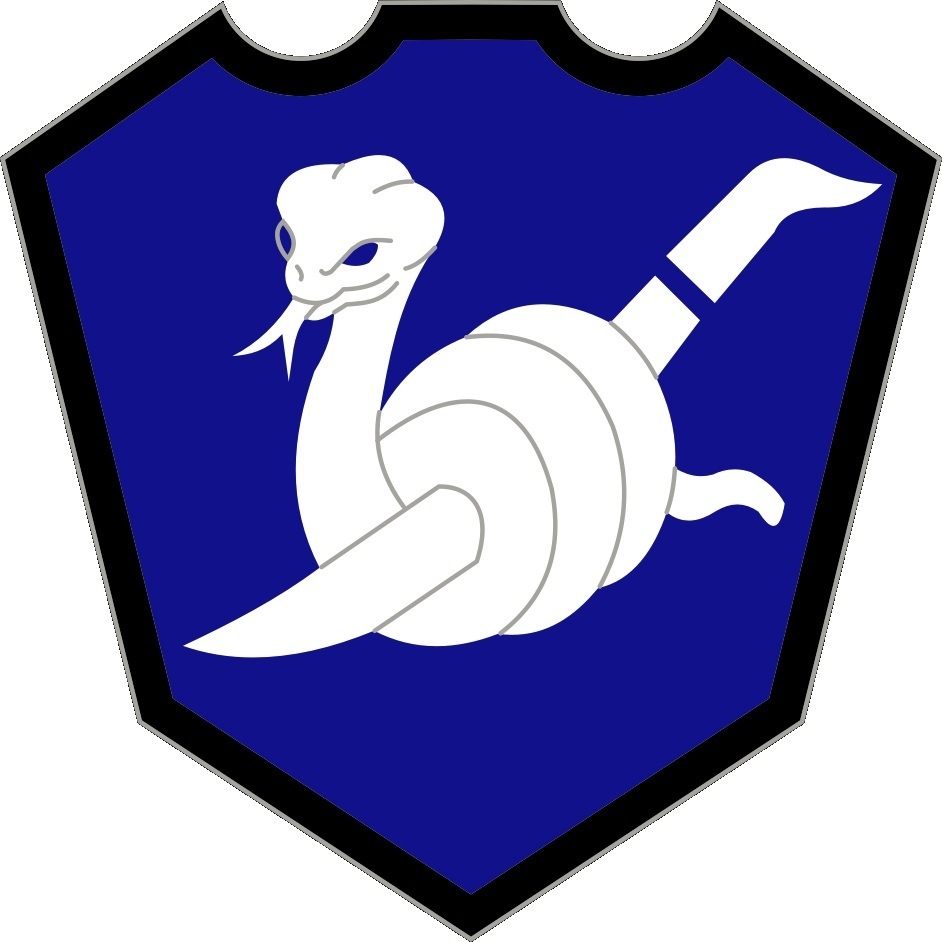
258th Infantry Brigade
Later was the 258th Military Police Brigade Is now the 158th Maneuver Enhancement Brigade

== Maneuver enhancement Brigades ==
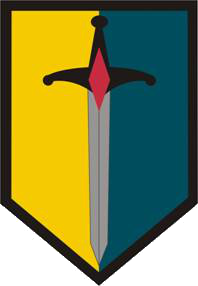
1st Maneuver Enhancement Brigade

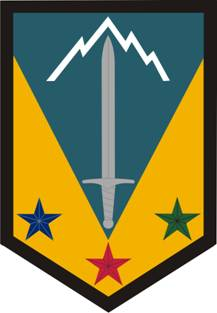
3rd Maneuver Enhancement Brigade

4th Maneuver Enhancement Brigade

26th Maneuver Enhancement Brigade
(Formerly 26th Infantry Brigade Combat Team)

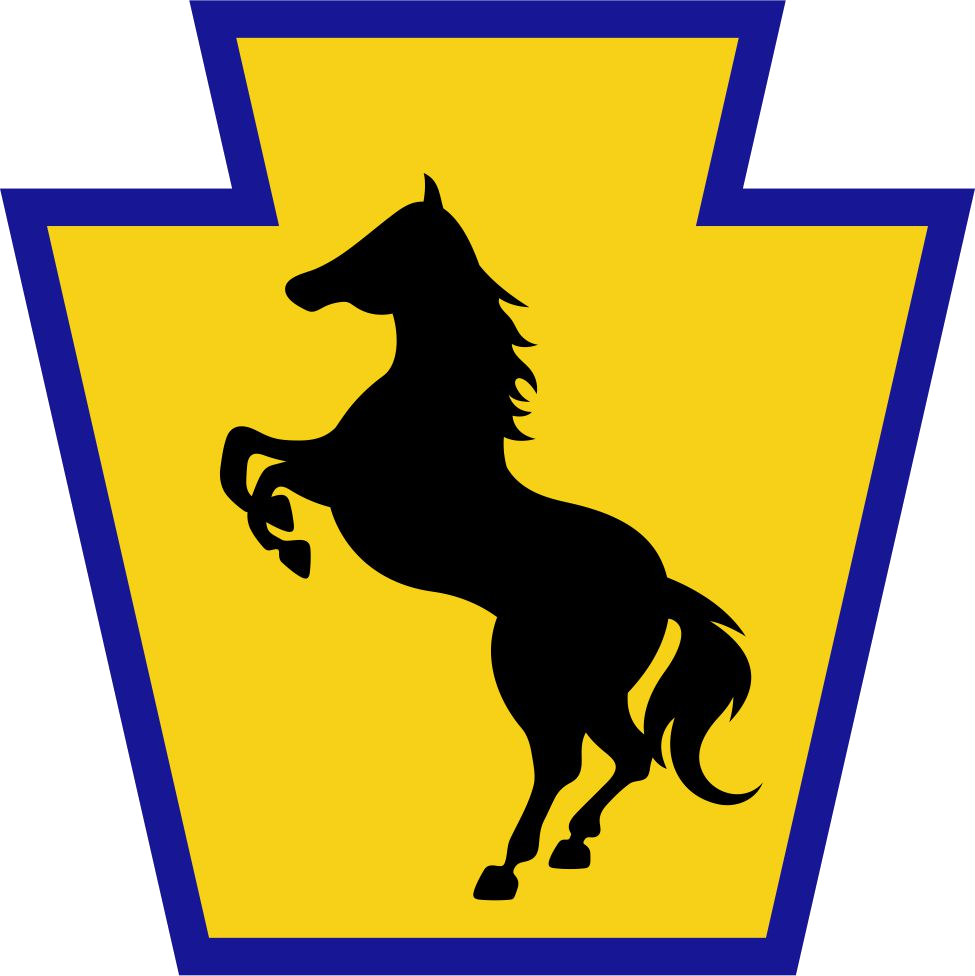
55th Maneuver Enhancement Brigade
(Formerly the 55th Armored Brigade Combat Team, 28th Infantry Division

67th Maneuver Enhancement Brigade
(Formerly the 67th Battlefield Surveillance Brigade)

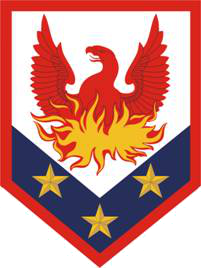
110th Maneuver Enhancement Brigade

111th Maneuver Enhancement Brigade

130th Maneuver Enhancement Brigade

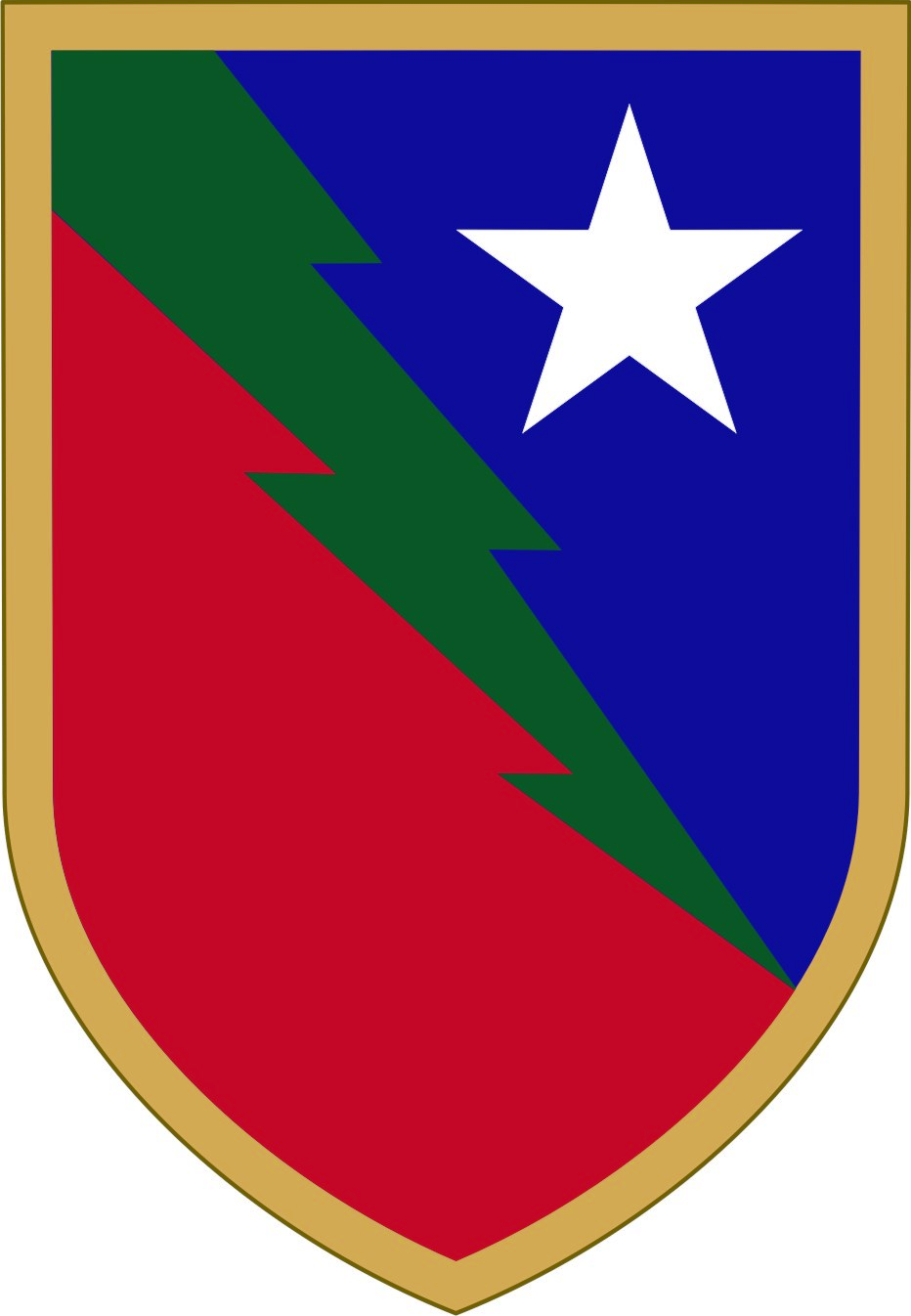
136th Maneuver Enhancement Brigade

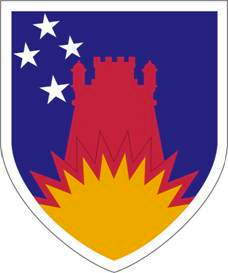
141st Maneuver Enhancement Brigade

149th Maneuver Enhancement Brigade
(Formerly 149th Armored Brigade)

157th Maneuver Enhancement Brigade (Formerly 57th Field Artillery Brigade)

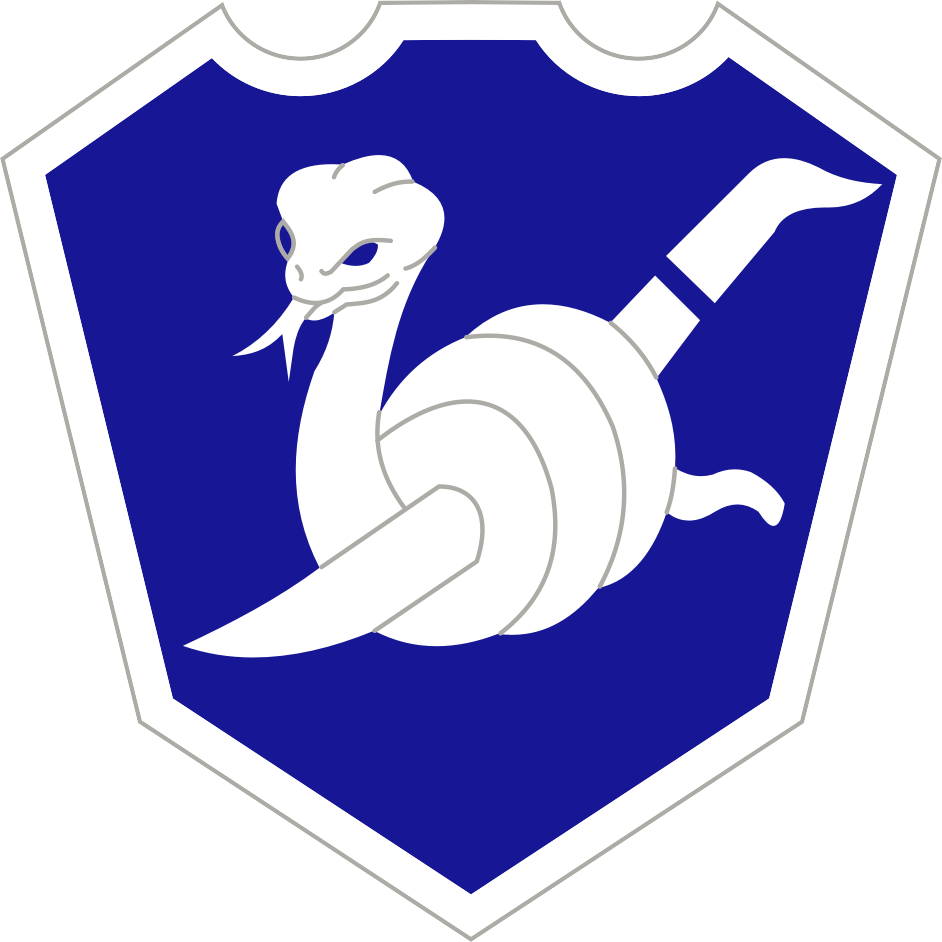
158th Maneuver Enhancement Brigade (Formerly 258th Military Police Brigade)

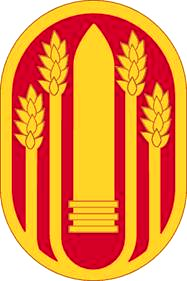
196th Maneuver Enhancement Brigade

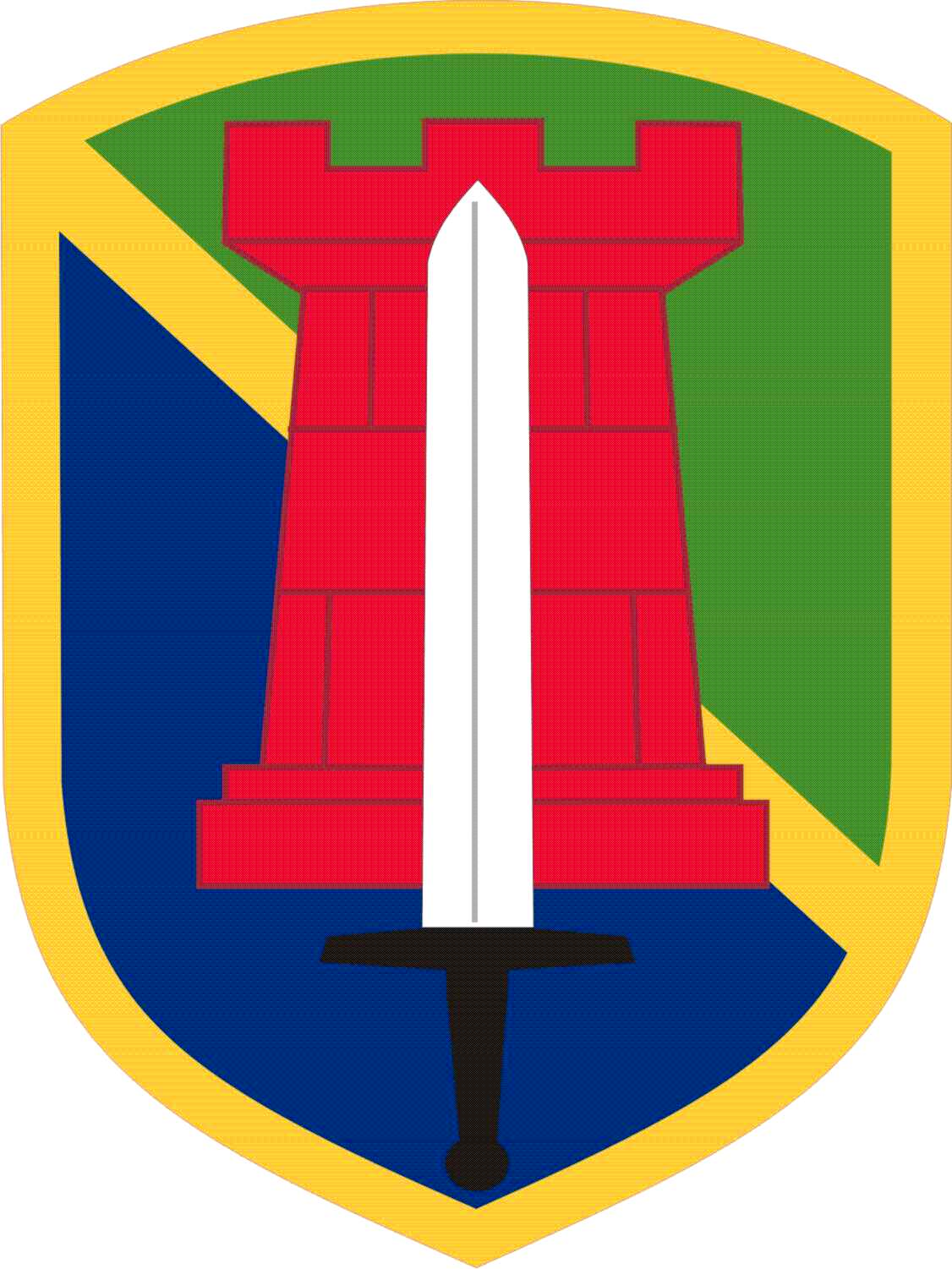
204th Maneuver Enhancement Brigade

218th Maneuver Enhancement Brigade (Formerly 218th Infantry Brigade)

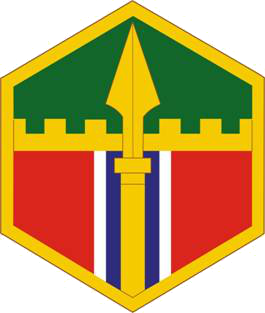
301st Maneuver Enhancement Brigade

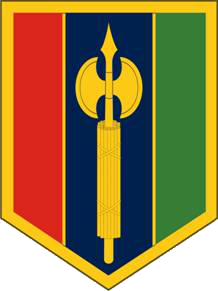
302nd Maneuver Enhancement Brigade

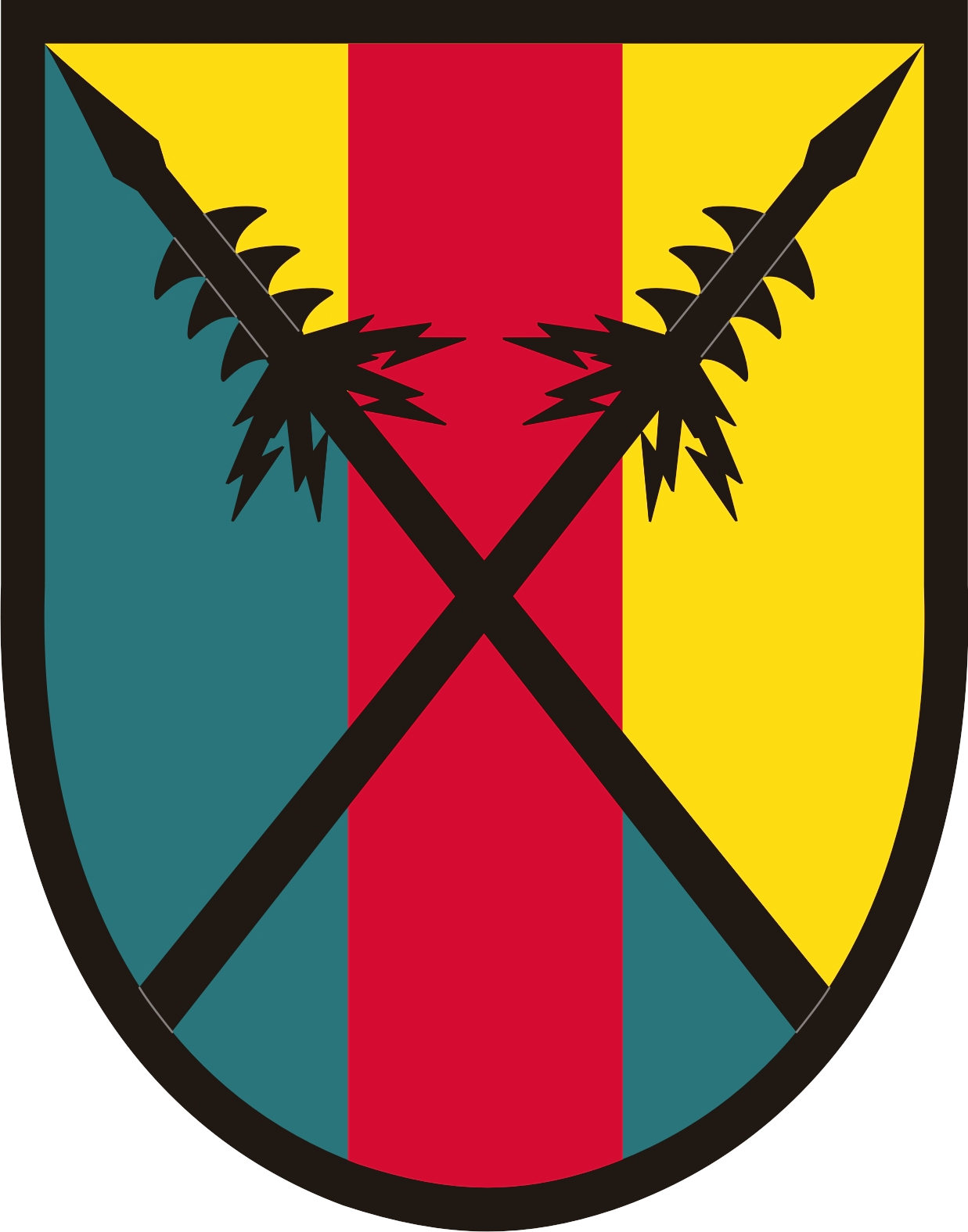
303rd Maneuver Enhancement Brigade "Pahu Imua"

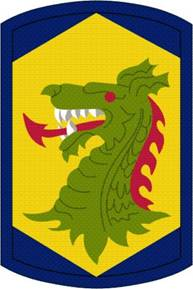
404th Maneuver Enhancement Brigade

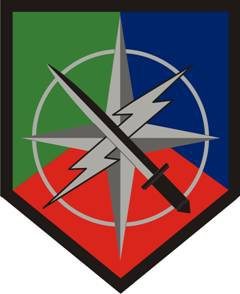
648th Maneuver Enhancement Brigade

== Medical Brigades ==
1st Medical Brigade

2nd Medical Brigade

4th Medical Brigade

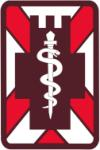
5th Medical Brigade

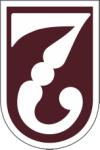
7th Medical Brigade

8th Medical Brigade

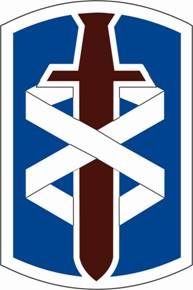
18th Medical Brigade (Now the 18th Medical Command)

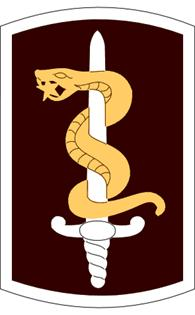
30th Medical Brigade (Formerly 30th Medical Command)

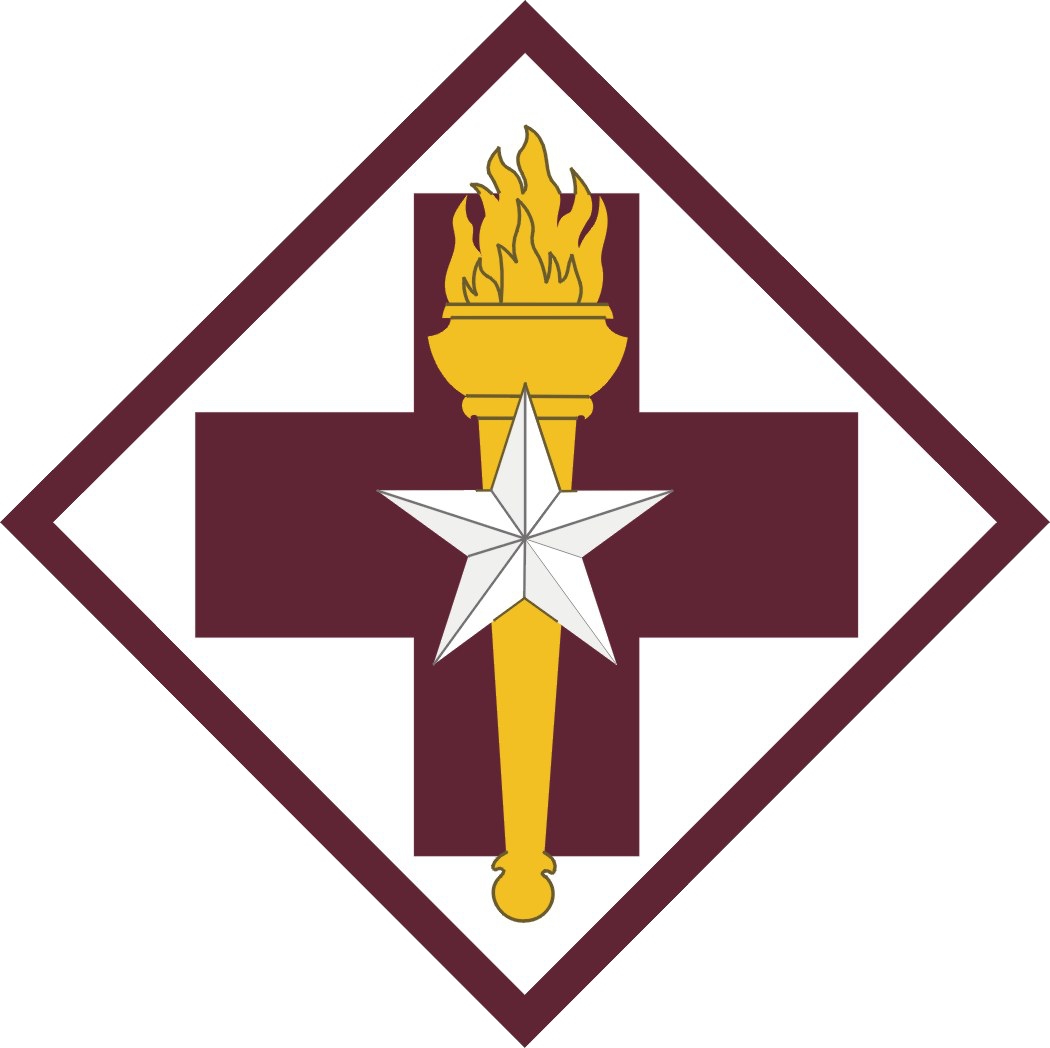
32nd Medical Brigade

44th Medical Brigade (Formerly 44th Medical Command)

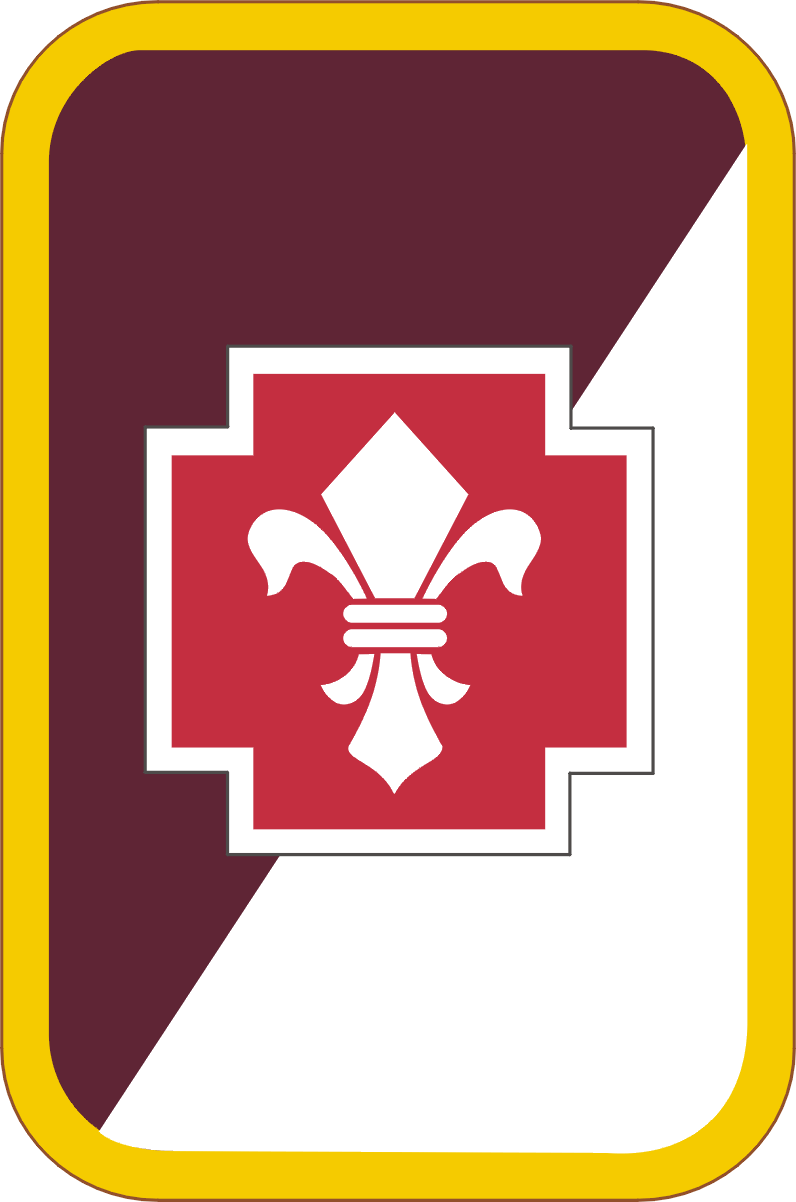
62nd Medical Brigade

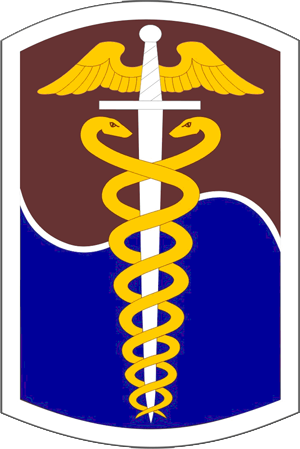
65th Medical Brigade

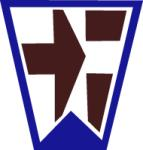
112th Medical Brigade

139th Medical Brigade

175th Medical Brigade

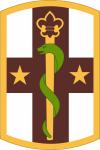
176th Medical Brigade

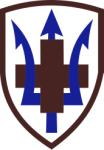
213th Medical Brigade

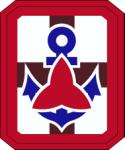
307th Medical Brigade

330th Medical Brigade

332nd Medical Brigade

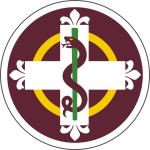
338th Medical Brigade

426th Medical Brigade

804th Medical Brigade

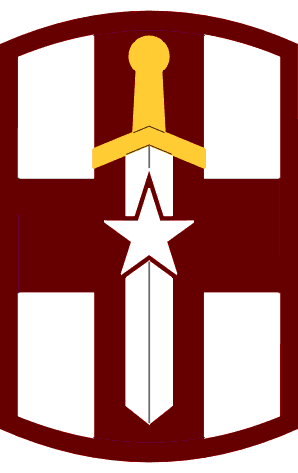
807th Medical Brigade
Now is the 807th Medical Command (Deployment Support)

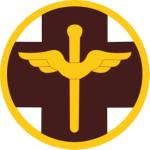
818th Medical Brigade

== Military intelligence Brigades ==
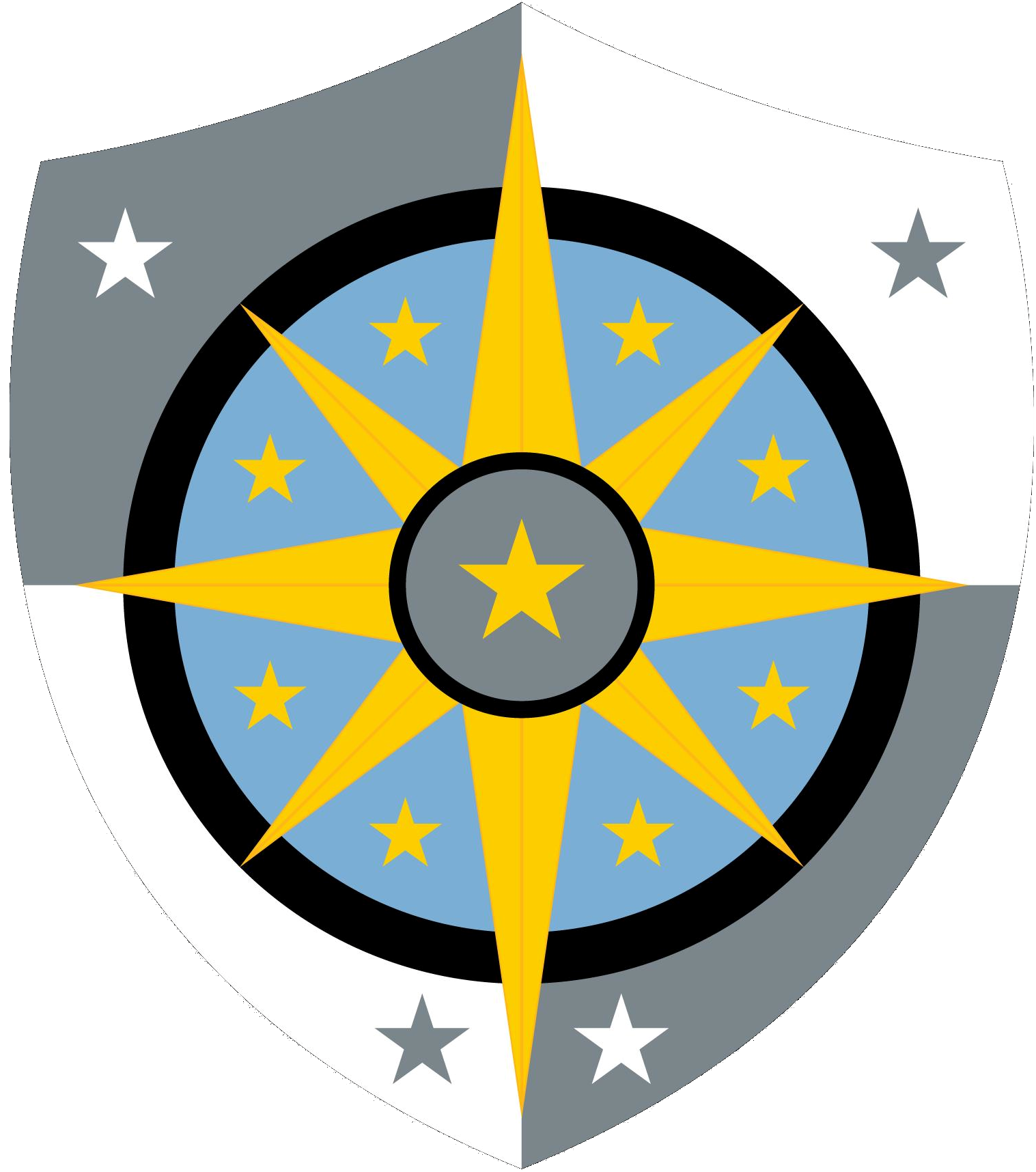
Army Cyber Protection Brigade

58th Expeditionary Military Intelligence Brigade

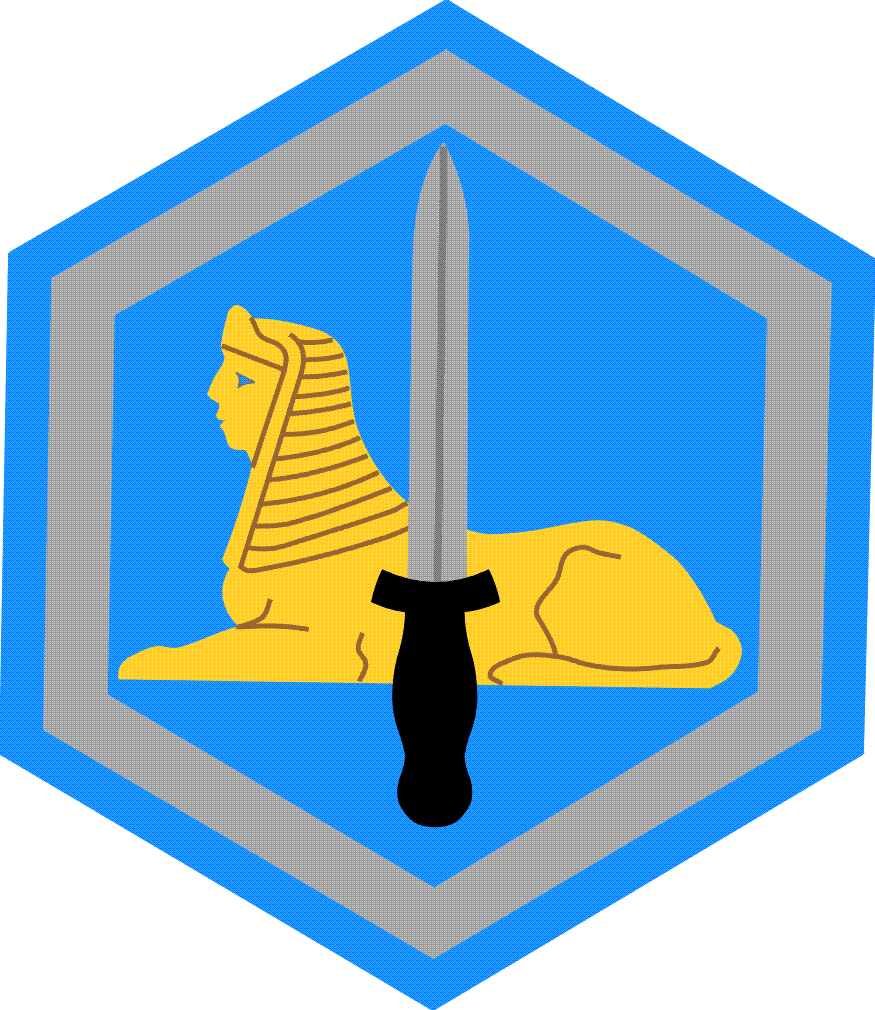
66th Military Intelligence Brigade

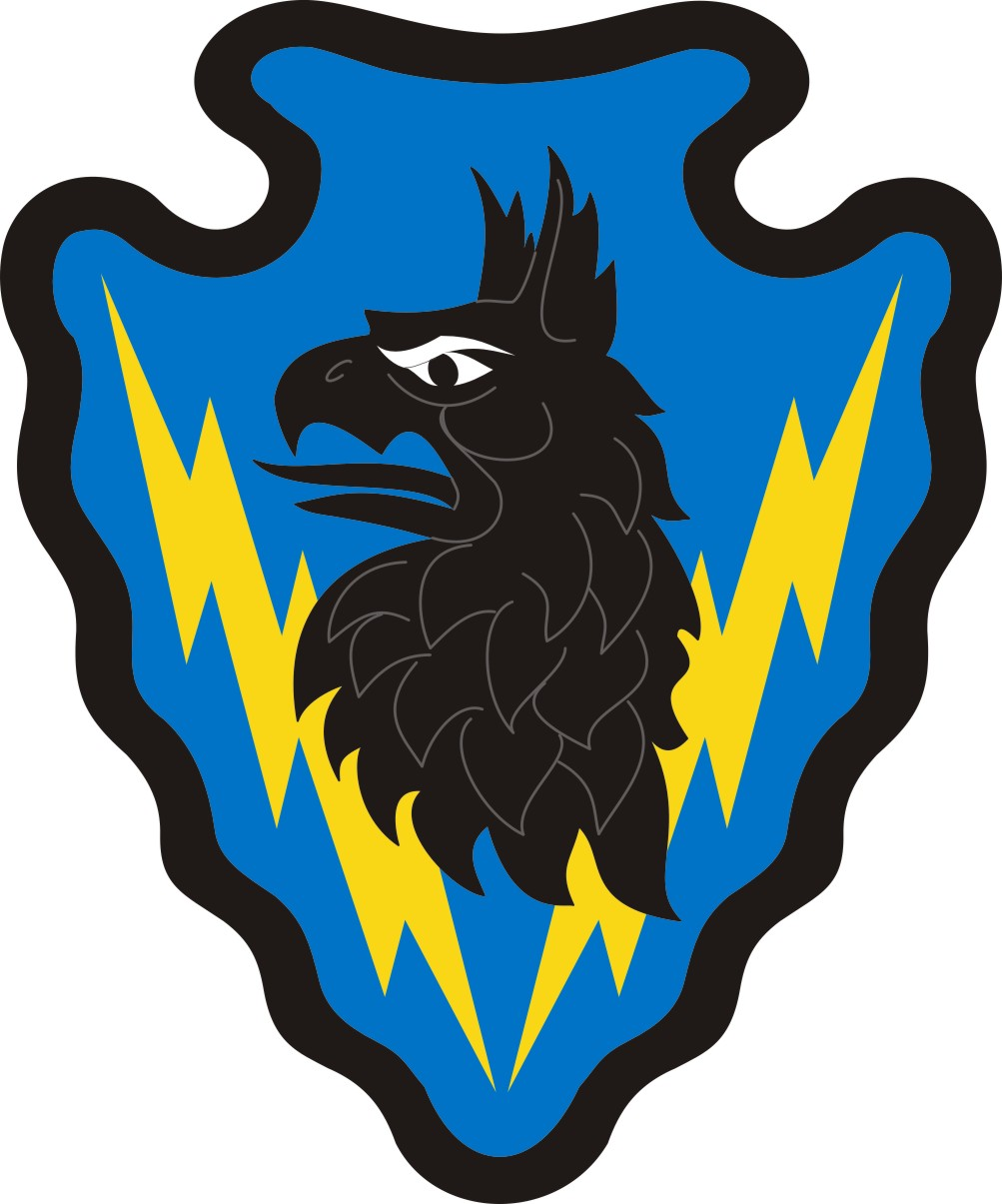
71st Expeditionary Military Intelligence Brigade

111th Military Intelligence Brigade

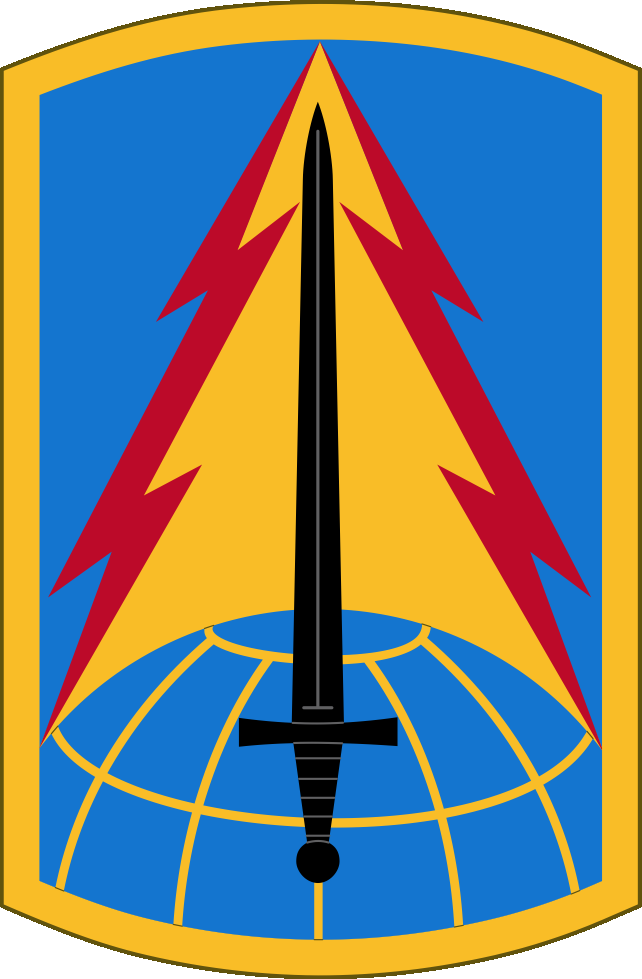
116th Military Intelligence Brigade

201st Military Intelligence Brigade

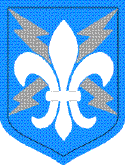
205th Military Intelligence Brigade

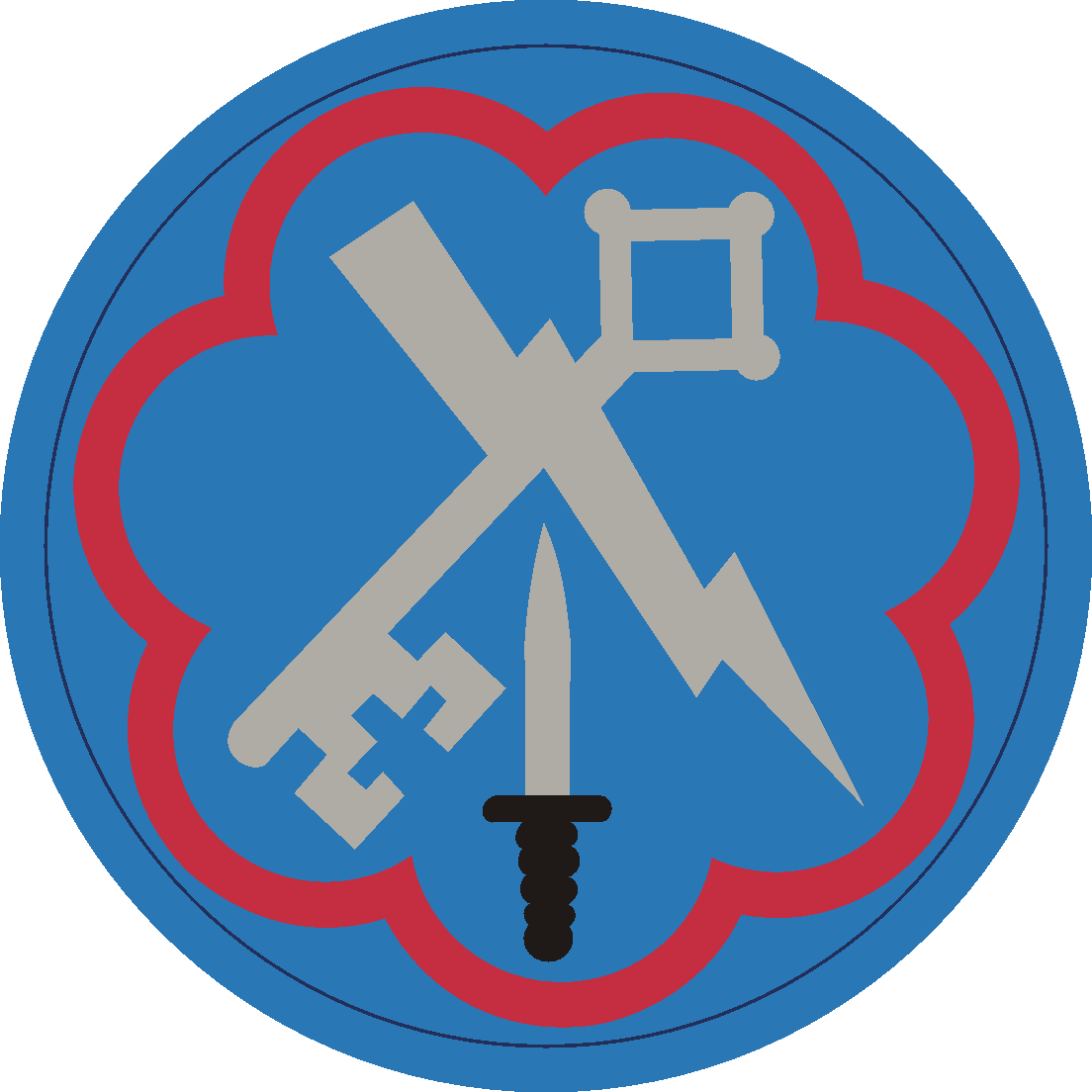
207th Military Intelligence Brigade

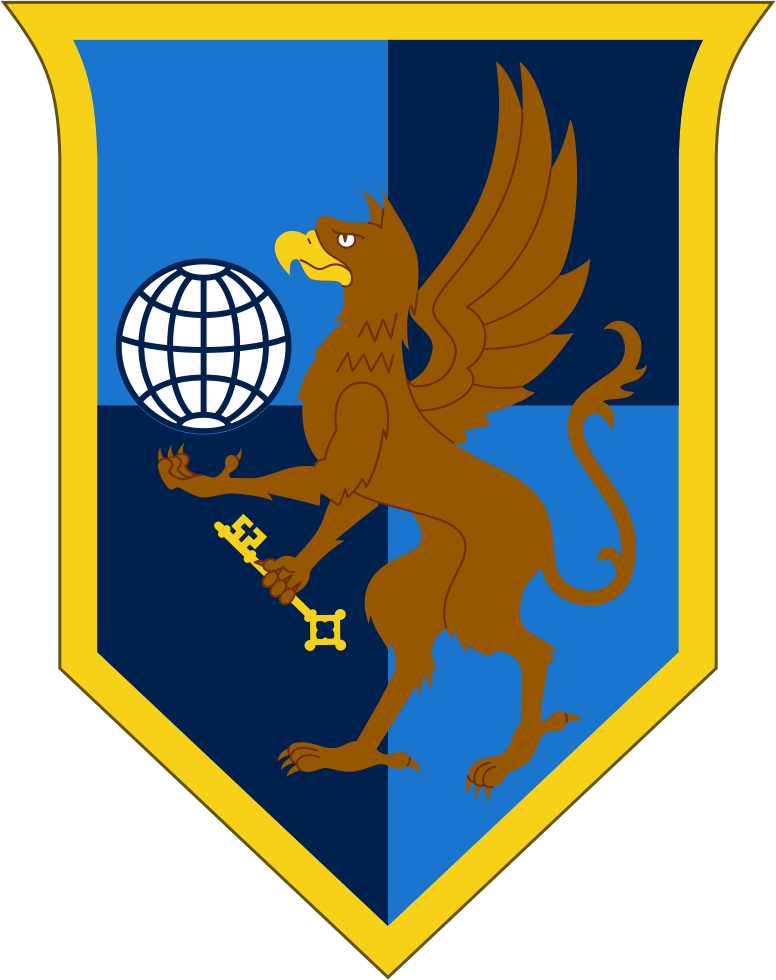
259th Military Intelligence Brigade (Expeditionary)

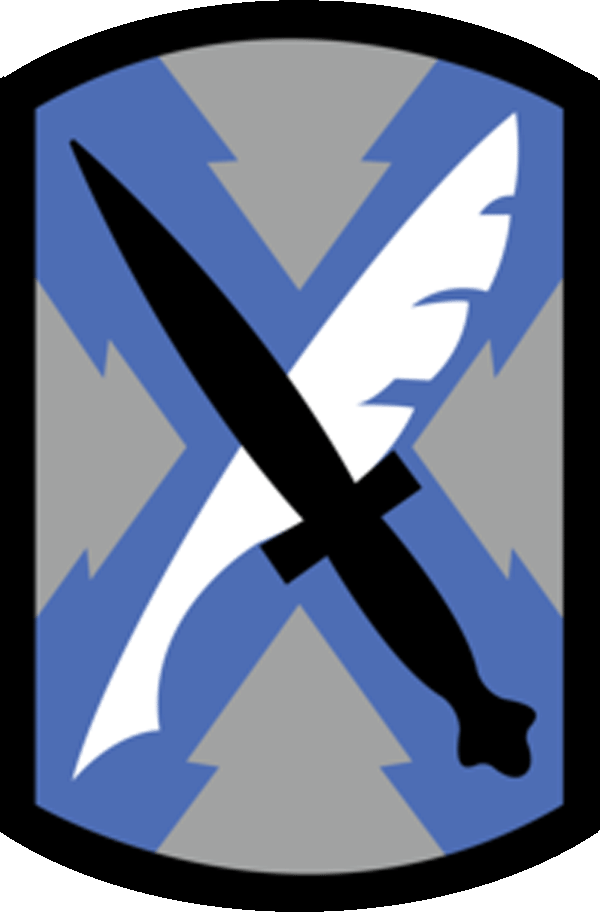
300th Military Intelligence Brigade

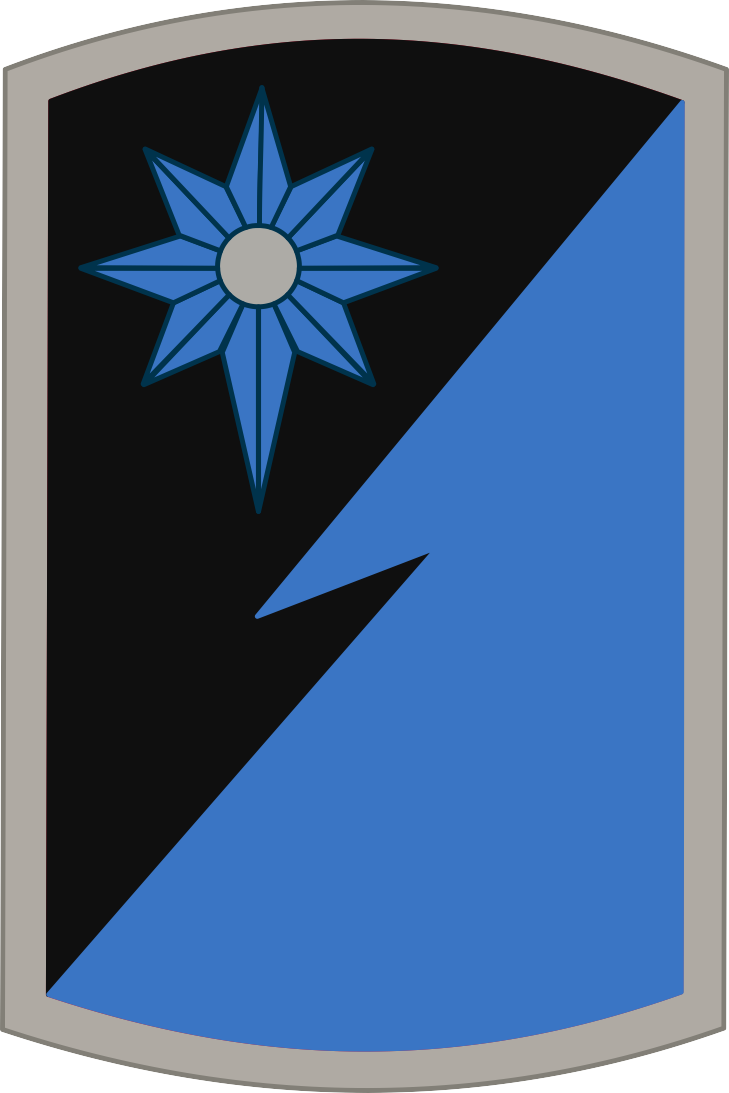
319th Military Intelligence Brigade

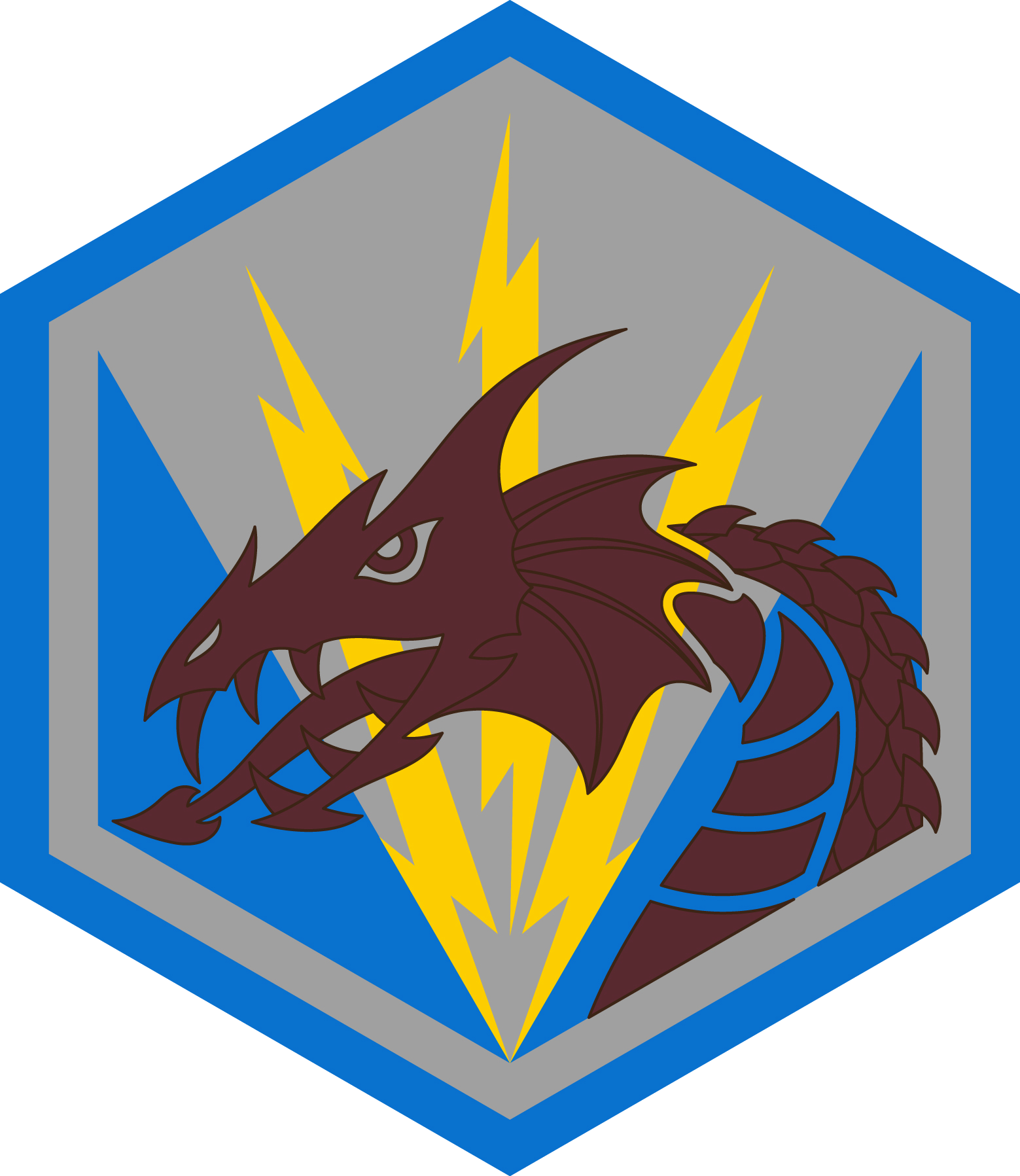
336th Military Intelligence Brigade (Expeditionary)

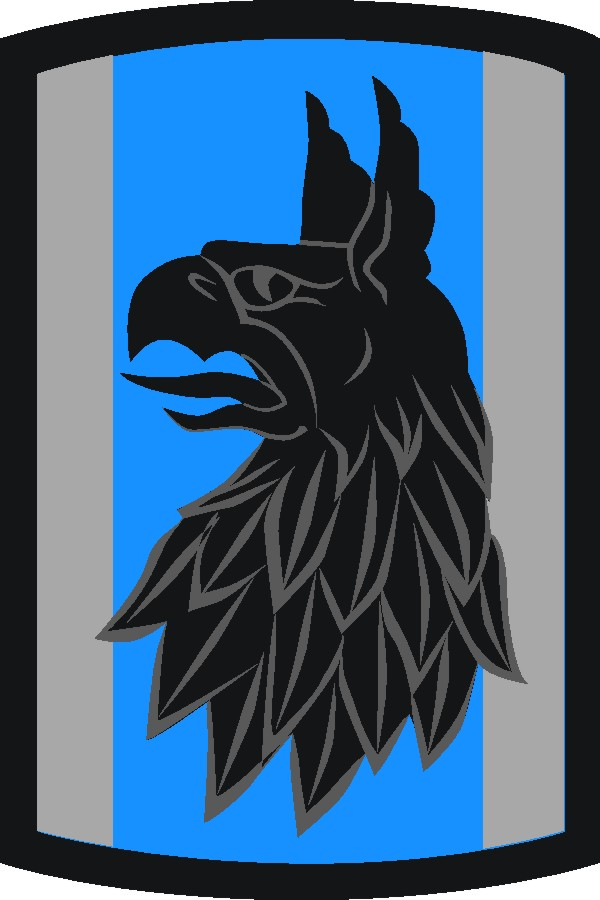
470th Military Intelligence Brigade

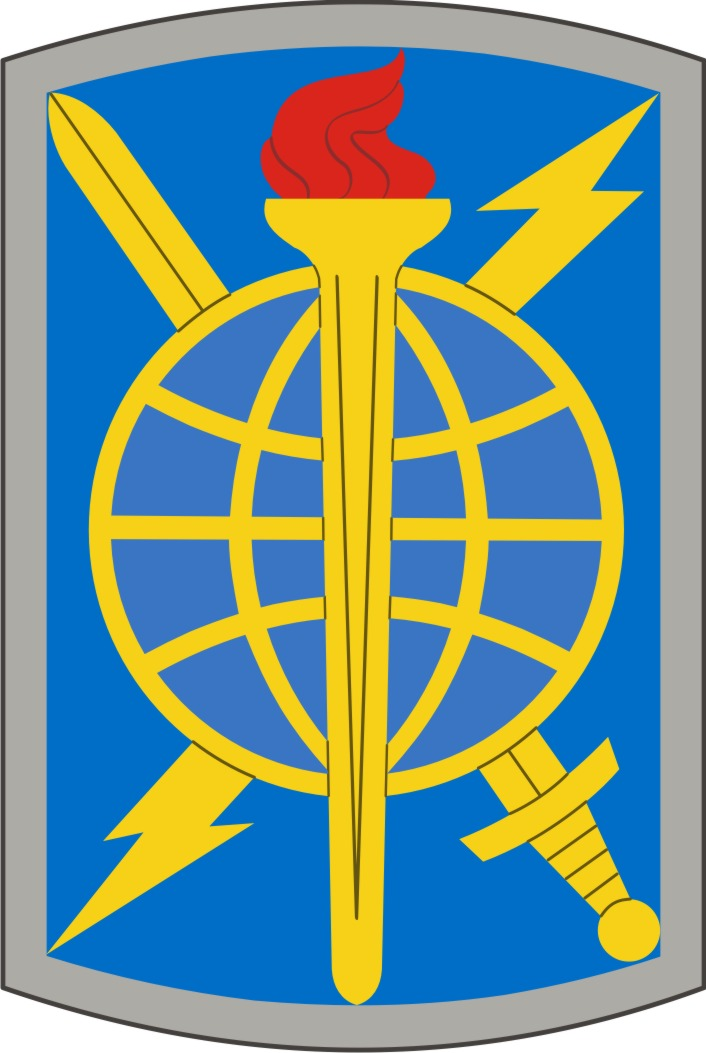
500th Military Intelligence Brigade

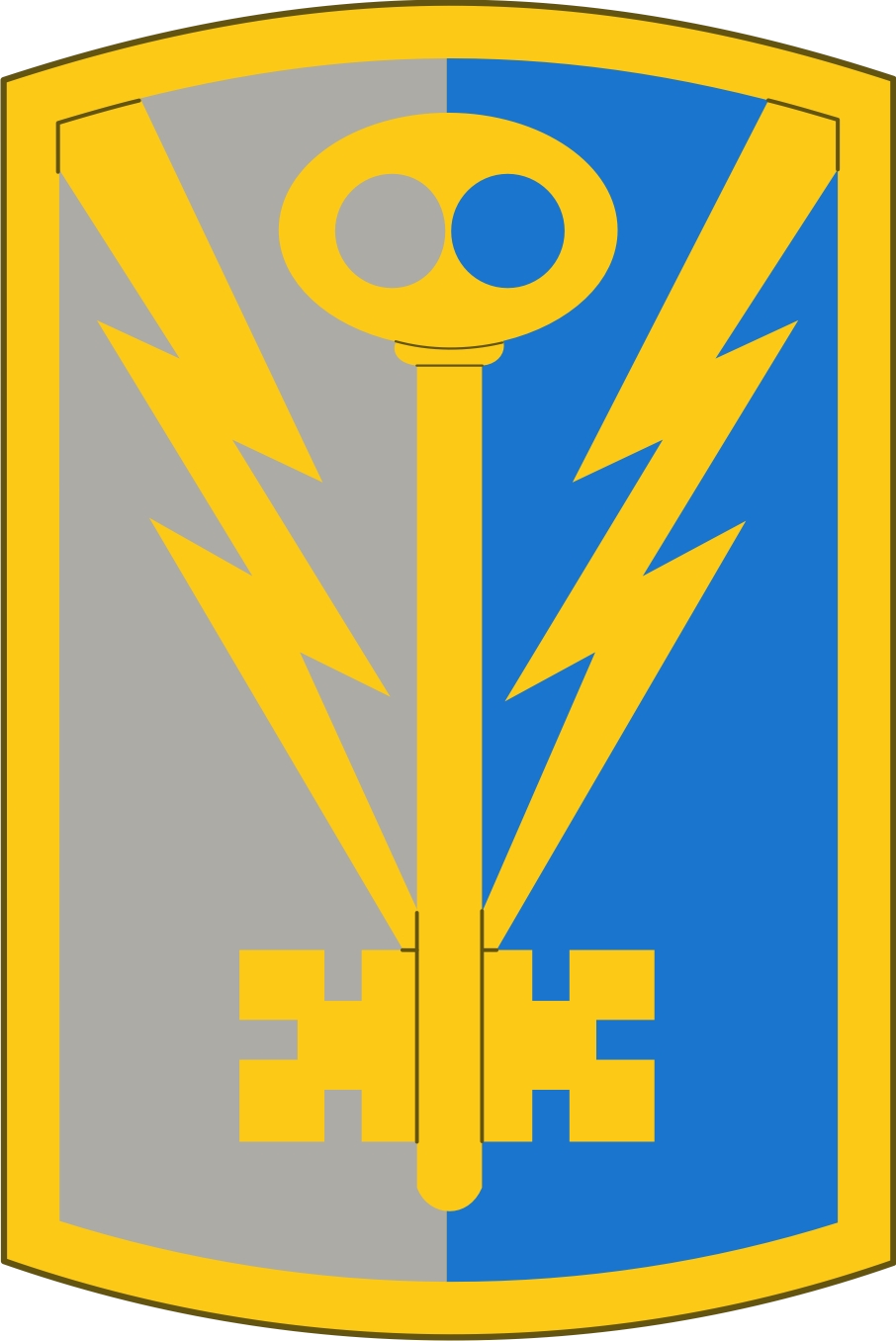
501st Military Intelligence Brigade

504th Military Intelligence Brigade

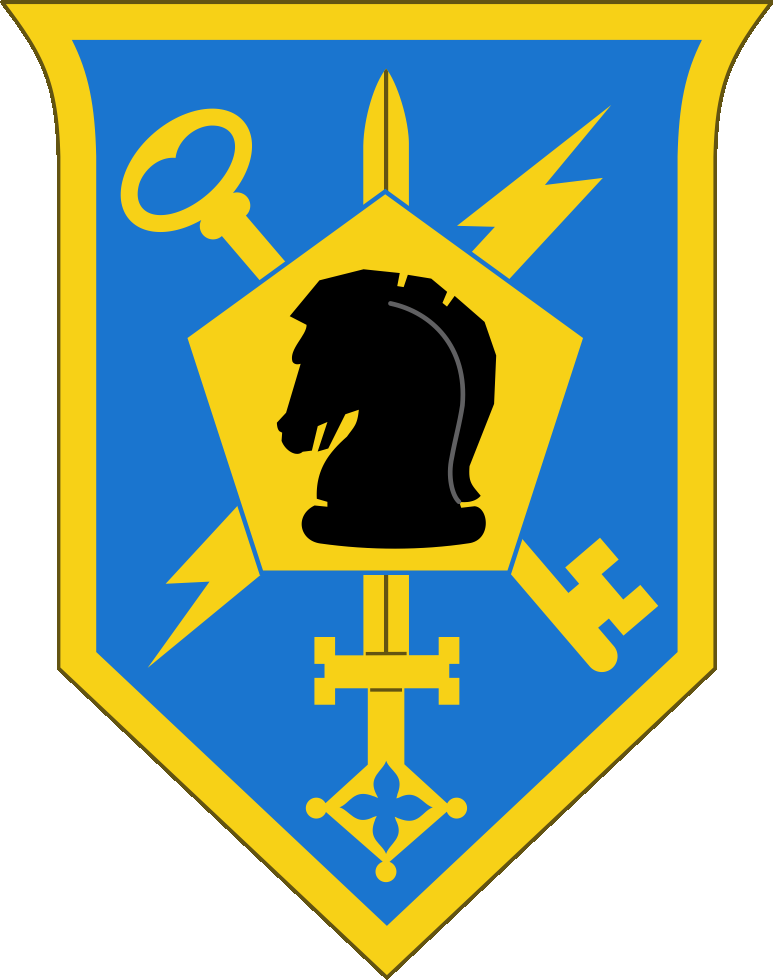
505th Military Intelligence Brigade

513th Military Intelligence Brigade

525th Expeditionary Military Intelligence Brigade

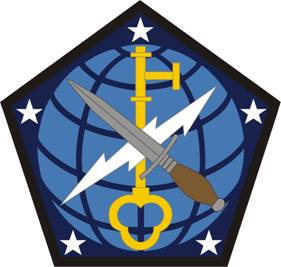
704th Military Intelligence Brigade

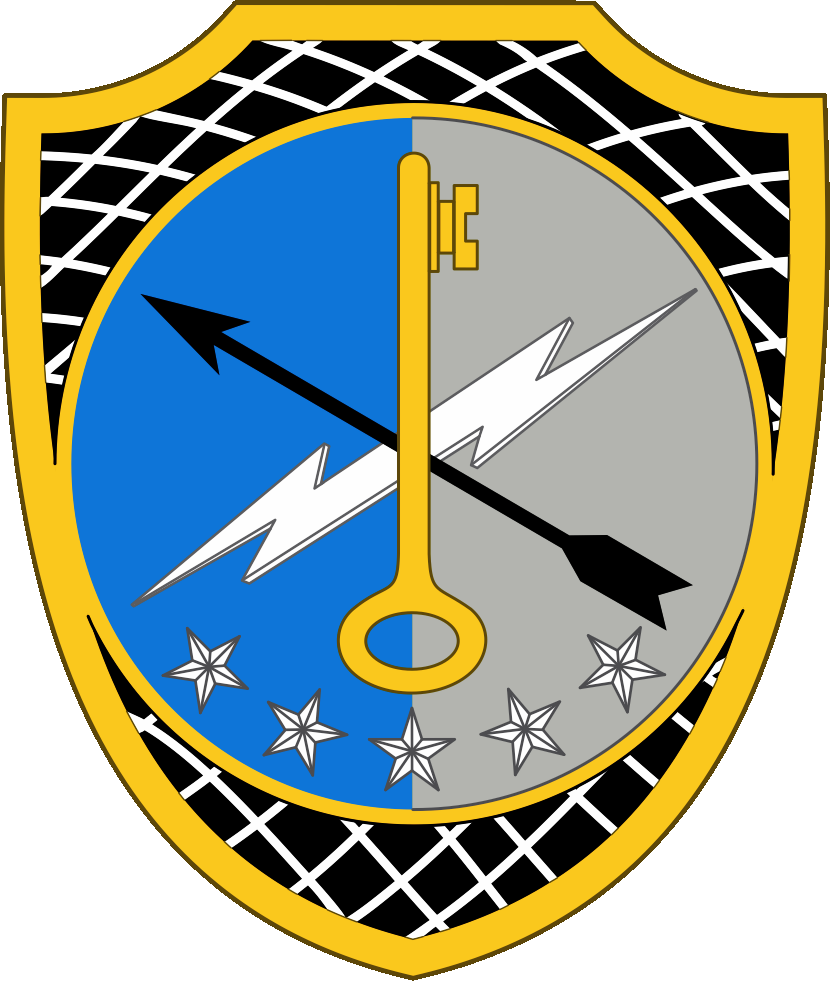
780th Military Intelligence Brigade

== Military police Brigades ==
8th Military Police Brigade

11th Military Police Brigade

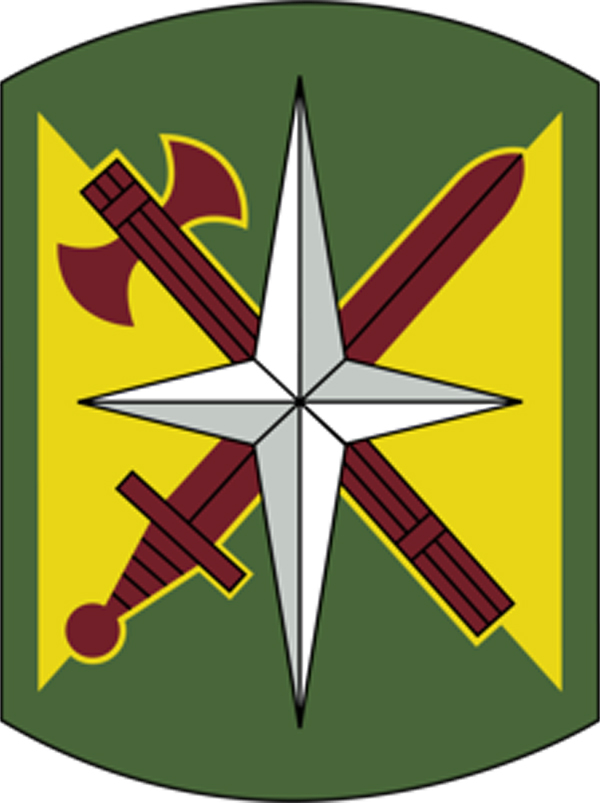
14th Military Police Brigade

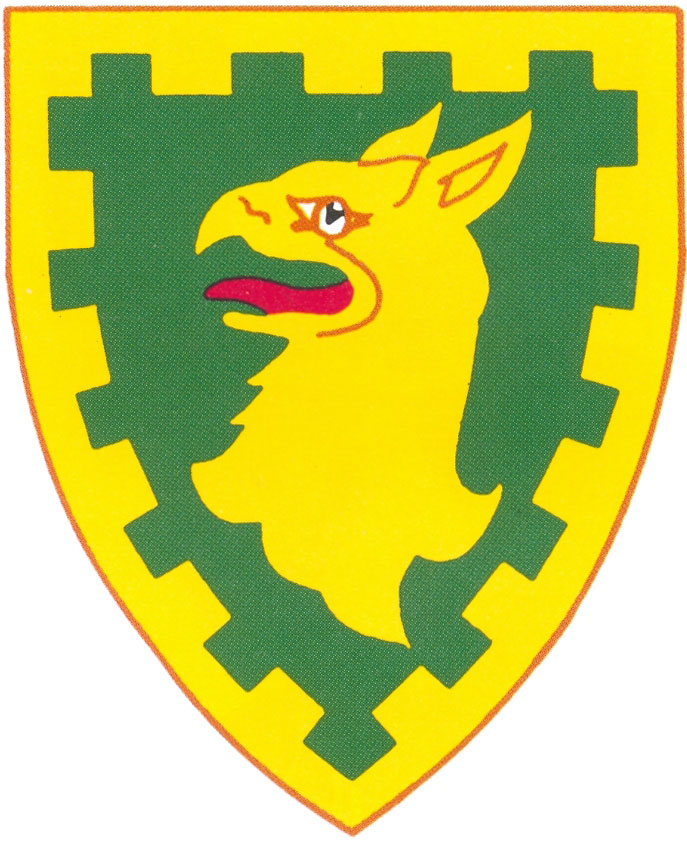
15th Military Police Brigade

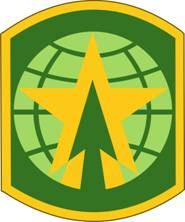
16th Military Police Brigade

18th Military Police Brigade

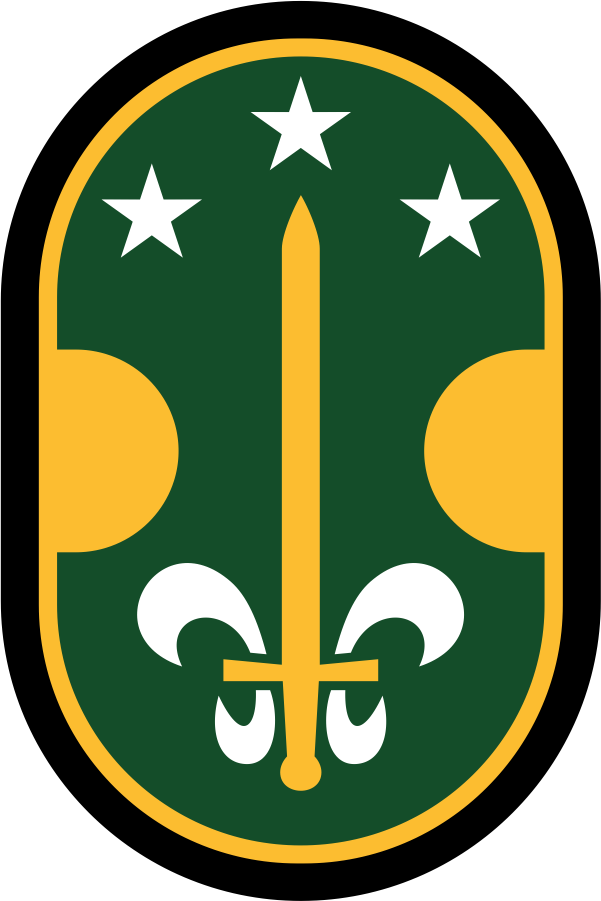
35th Military Police Brigade

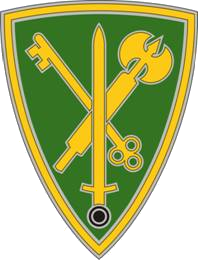
42nd Military Police Brigade

43rd Military Police Brigade

49th Military Police Brigade (Formerly the 49th Infantry Brigade)

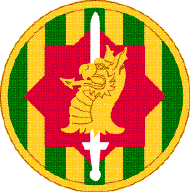
89th Military Police Brigade

92nd Military Police Brigade

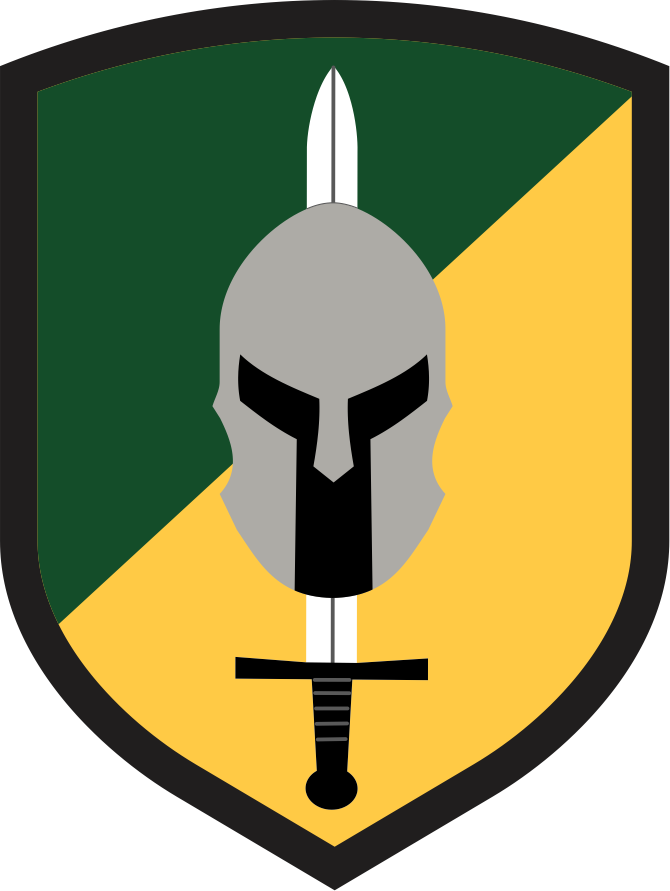
142nd Military Police Brigade

177th Military Police Brigade

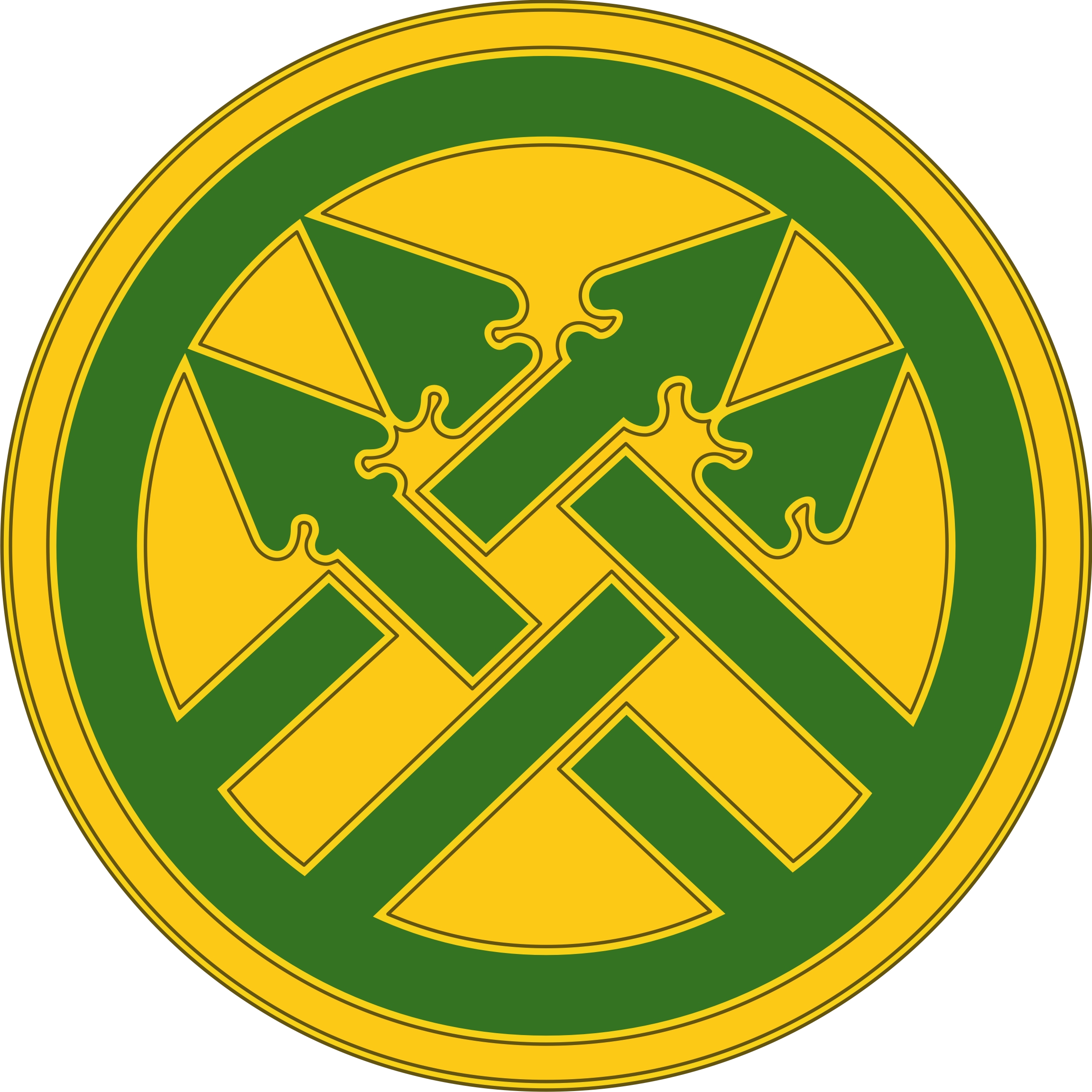
220th Military Police Brigade

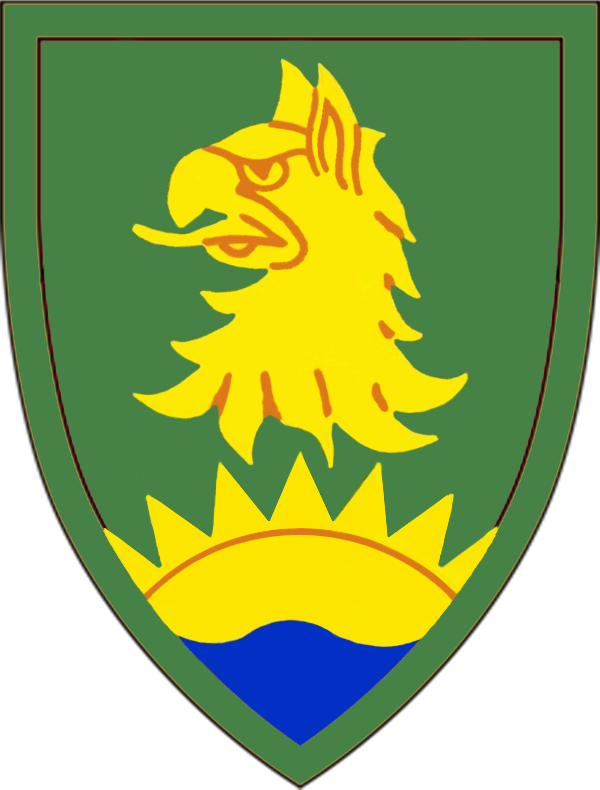
221st Military Police Brigade

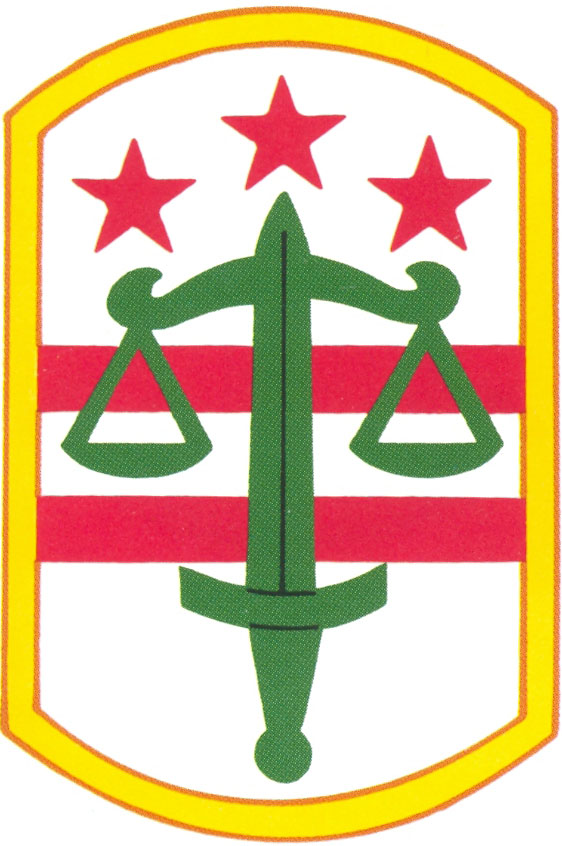
260th Military Police Brigade (Command)

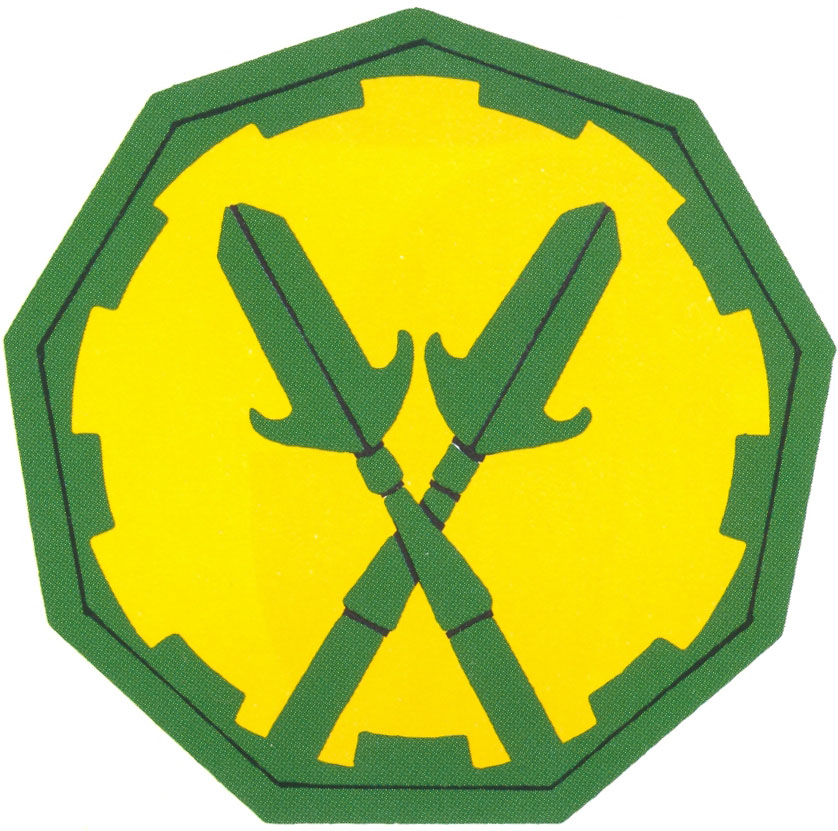
290th Military Police Brigade

300th Military Police Brigade

333rd Military Police Brigade formerly 800th Military Police Brigade

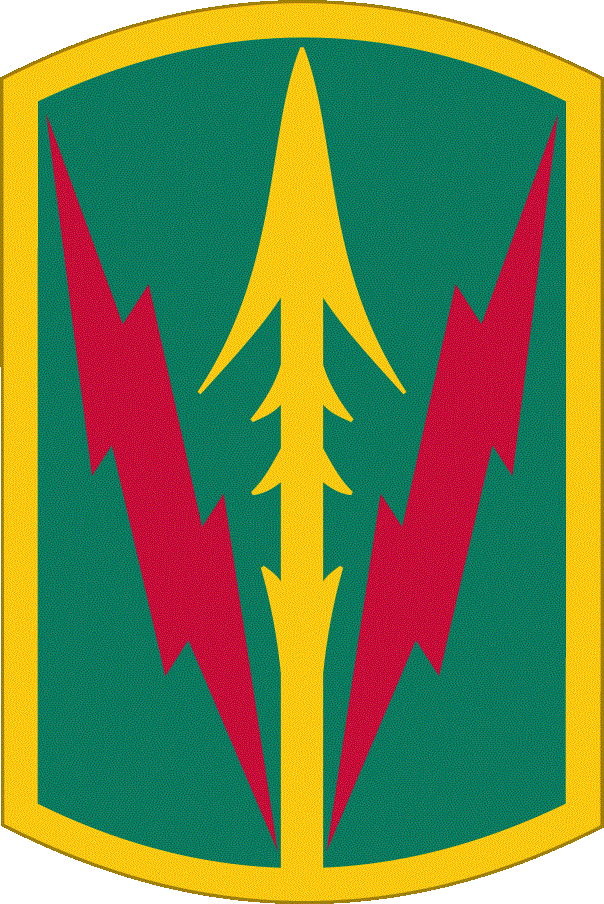
Military Police Brigade-Hawaii

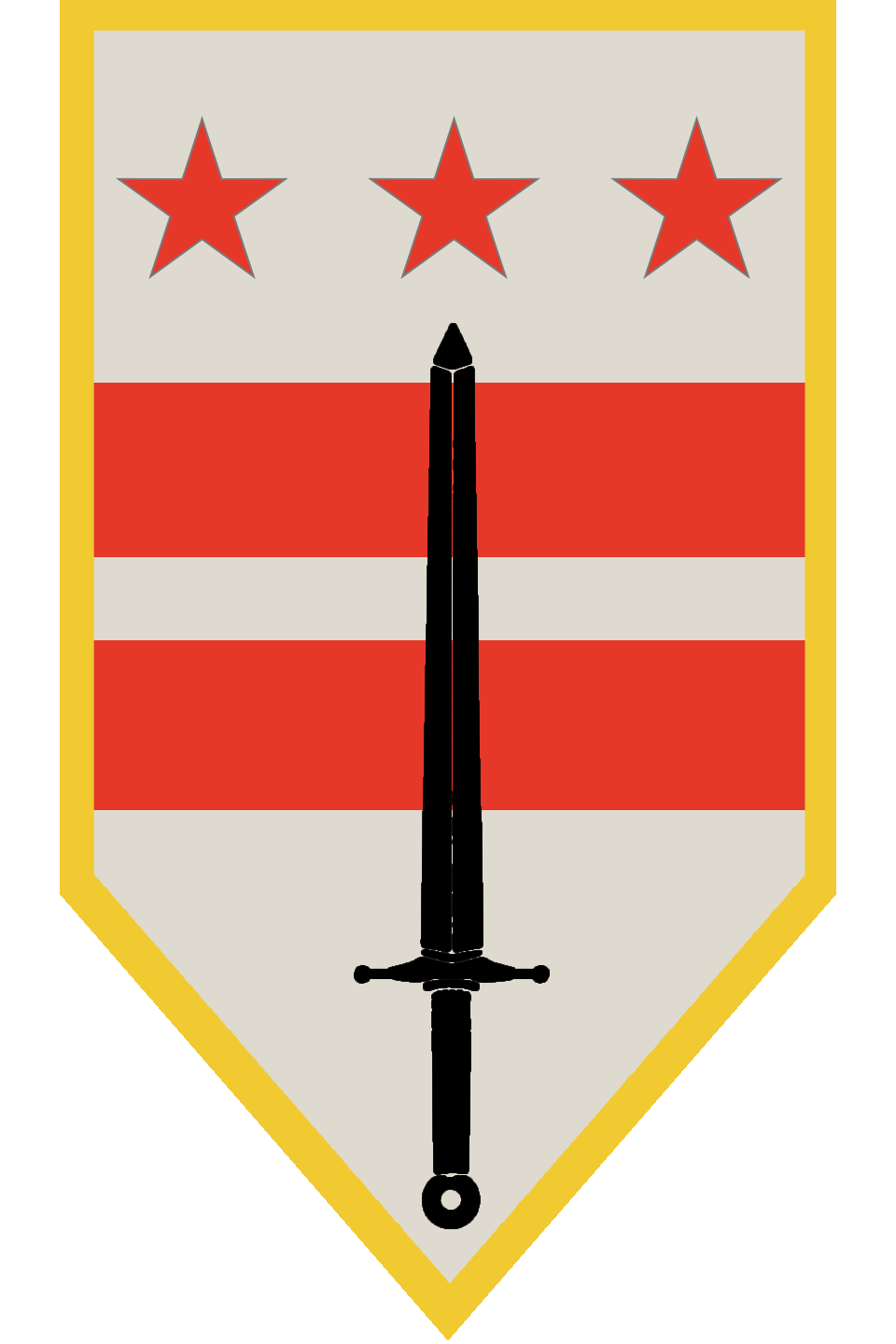
260th Special Purpose Brigade

== Ordnance Brigades ==
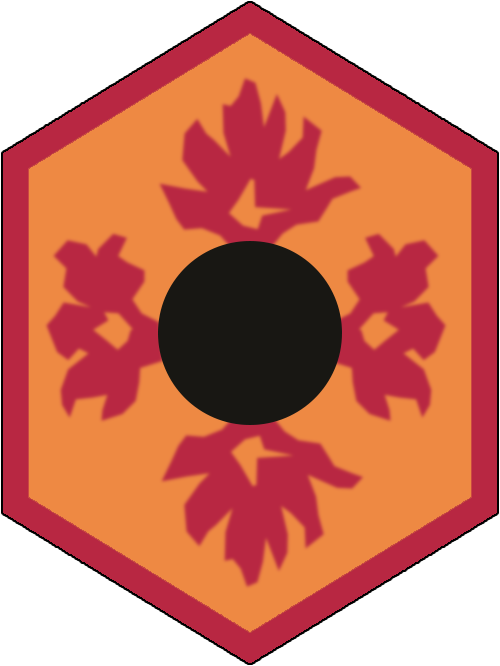
57th Ordnance Brigade (Ammo) 1965-1992

59th Ordnance Brigade

== Quartermaster Brigades ==
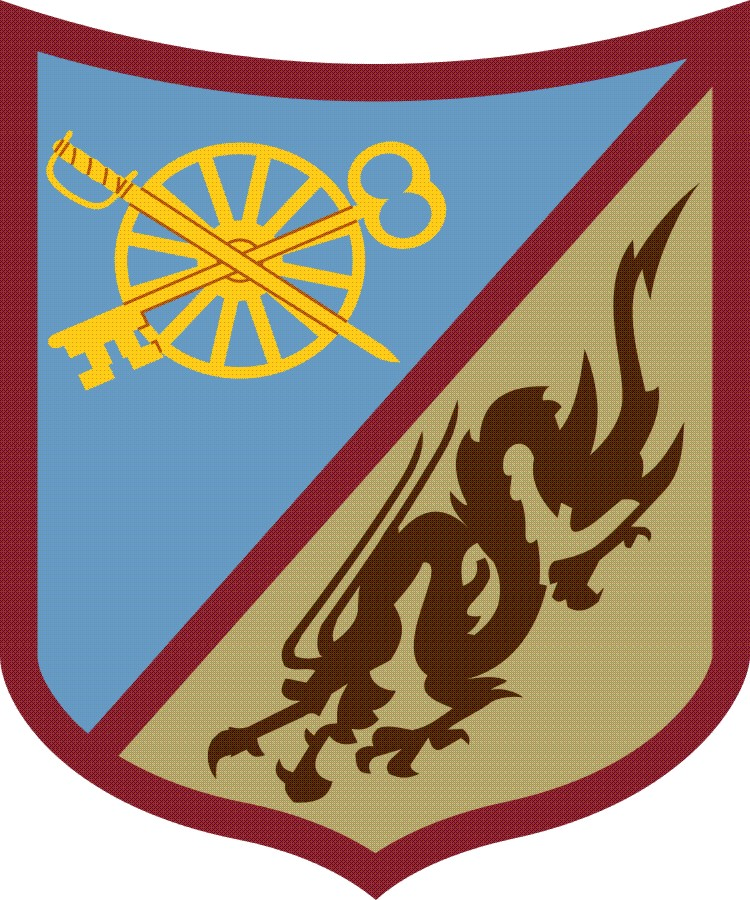
23rd Quartermaster Brigade

== Space and missile defense Brigades ==
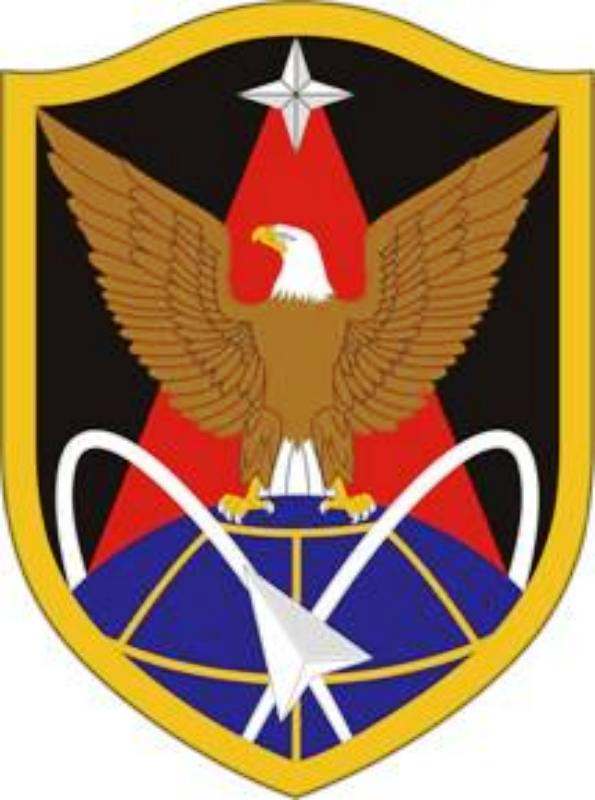
1st Space Brigade

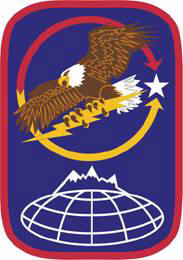
100th Missile Defense Brigade

== Signal Brigades ==
1st Signal Brigade

2nd Signal Brigade

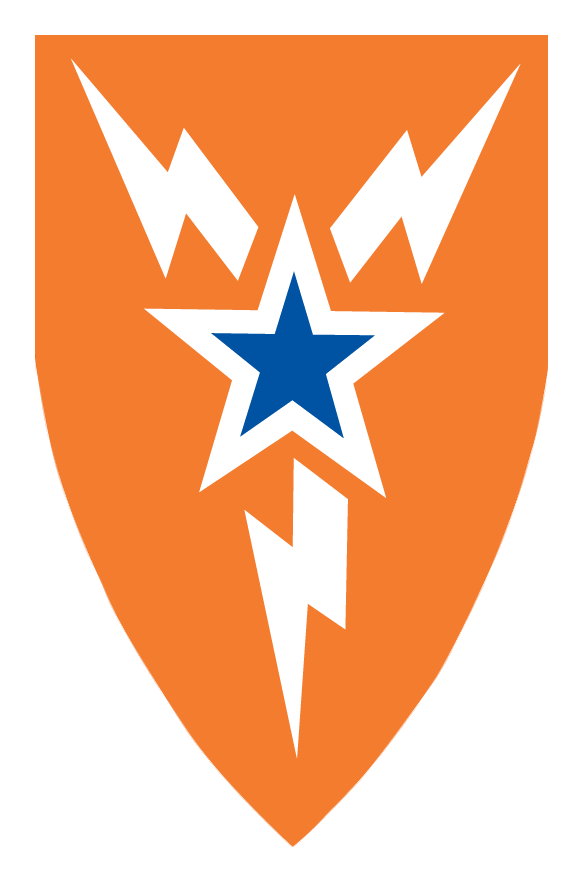
3rd Signal Brigade

7th Signal Brigade

11th Signal Brigade

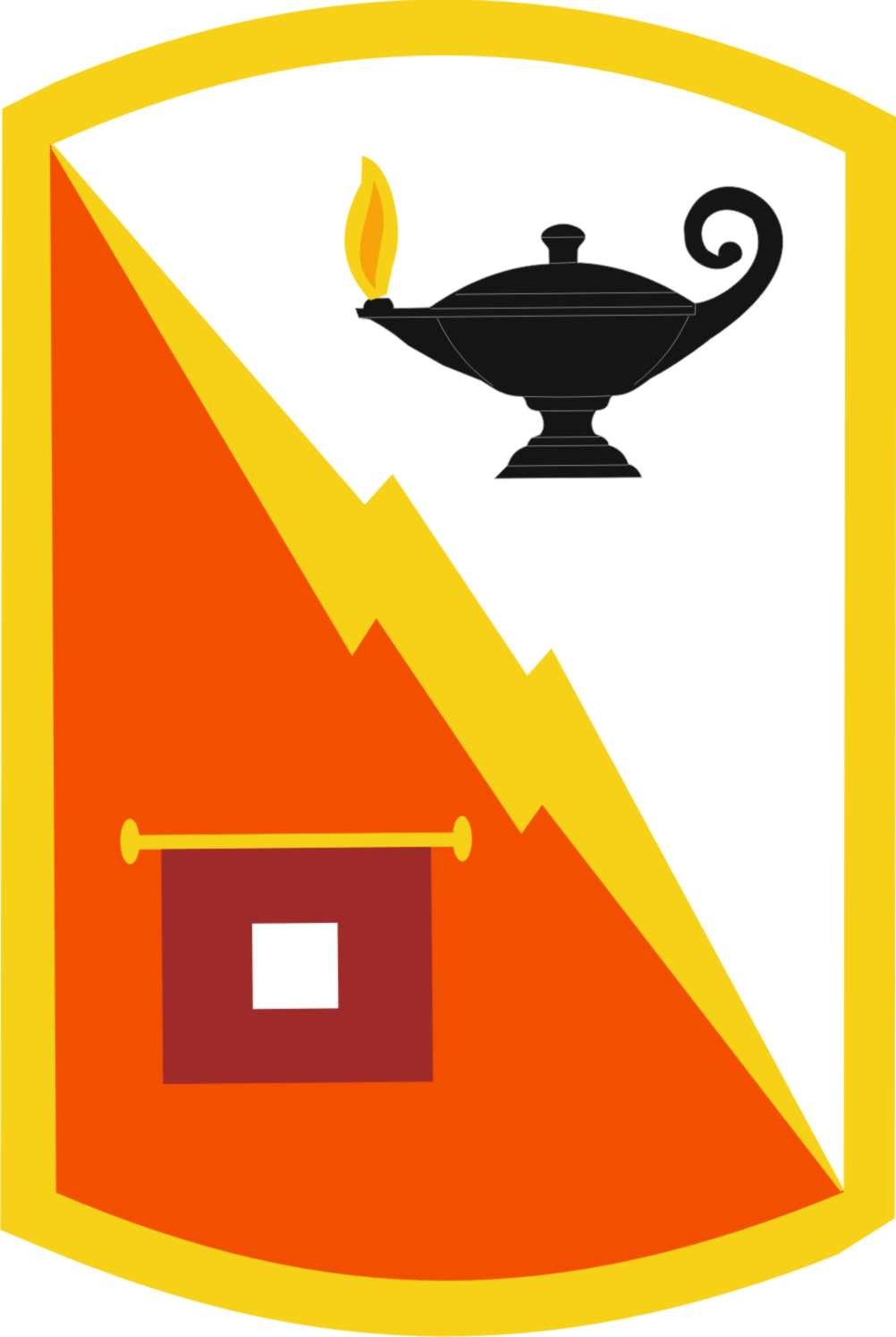
15th Signal Brigade

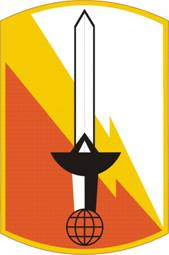
21st Signal Brigade

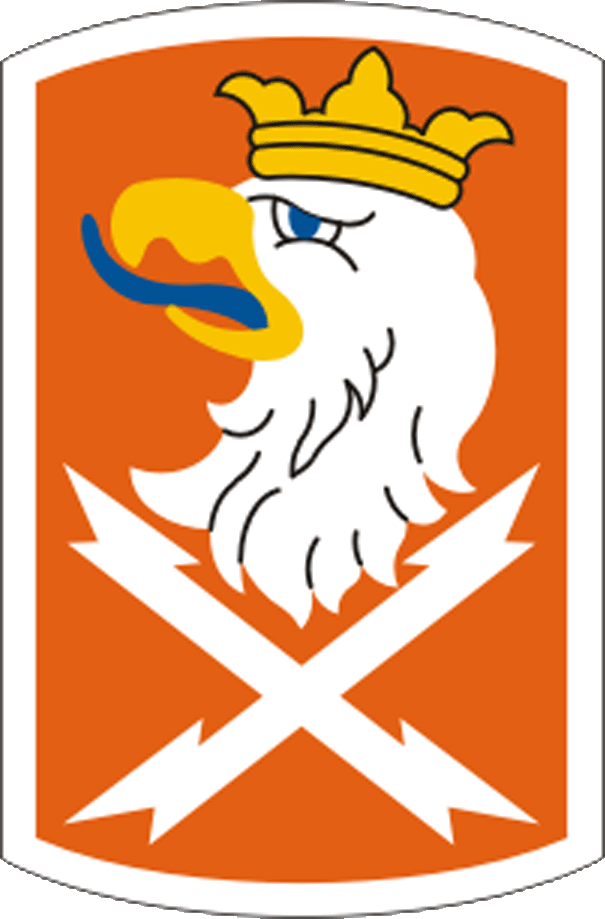
22nd Signal Brigade

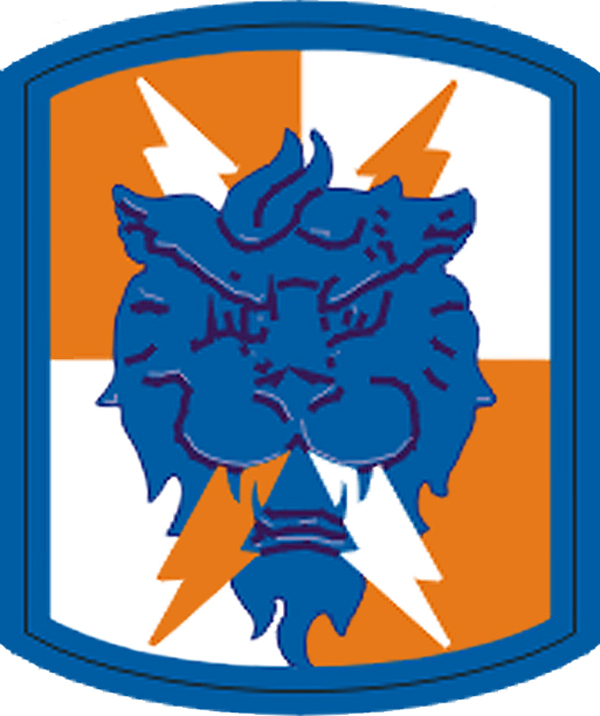
35th Signal Brigade

93rd Signal Brigade

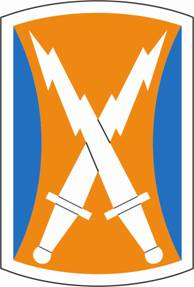
106th Signal Brigade

142nd Signal Brigade

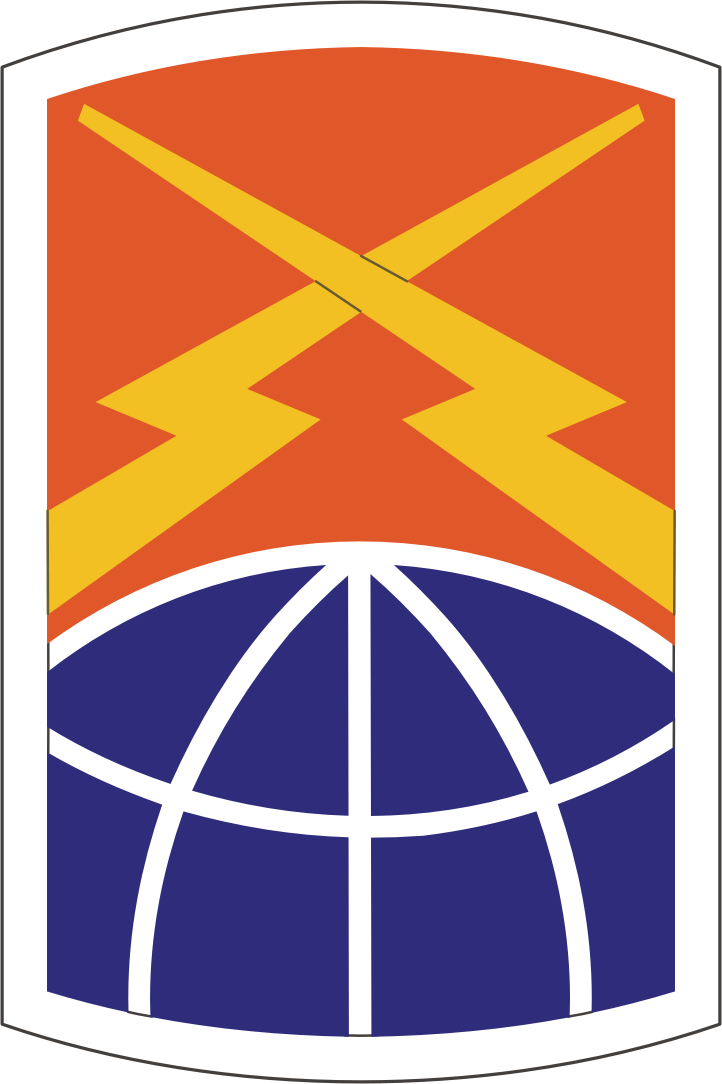
160th Signal Brigade

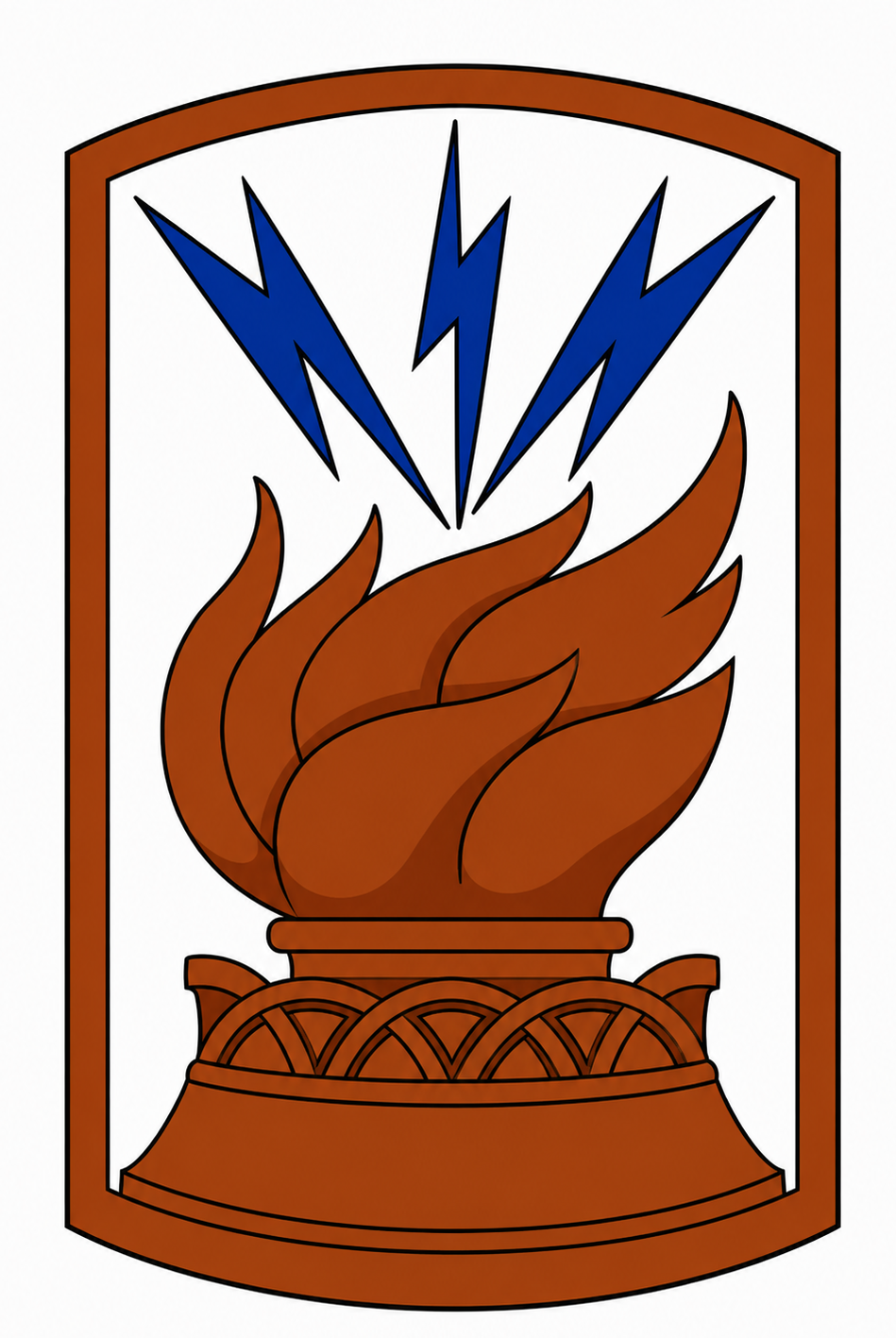
187th Signal Brigade

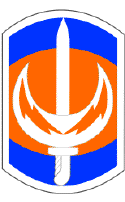
228th Signal Brigade

261st Signal Brigade

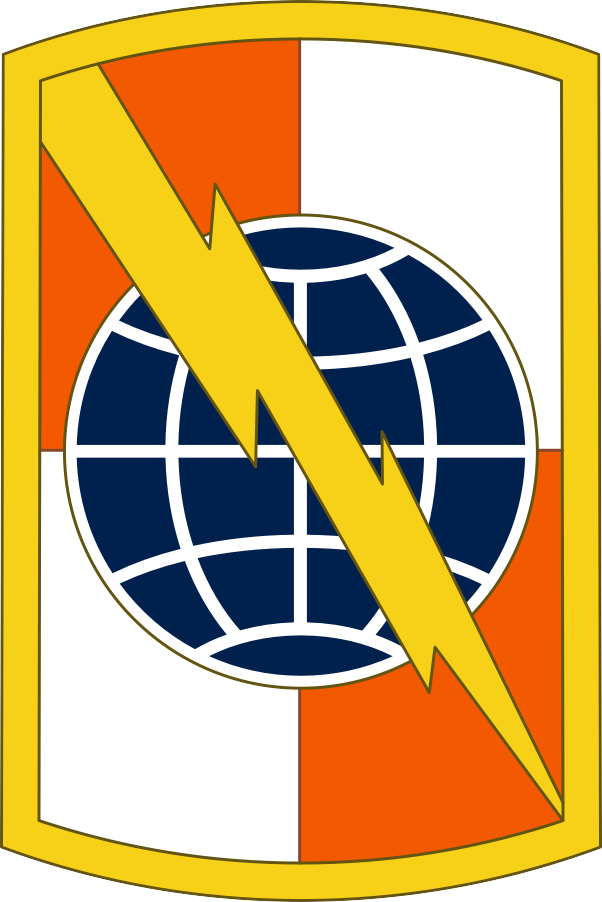
359th Signal Brigade

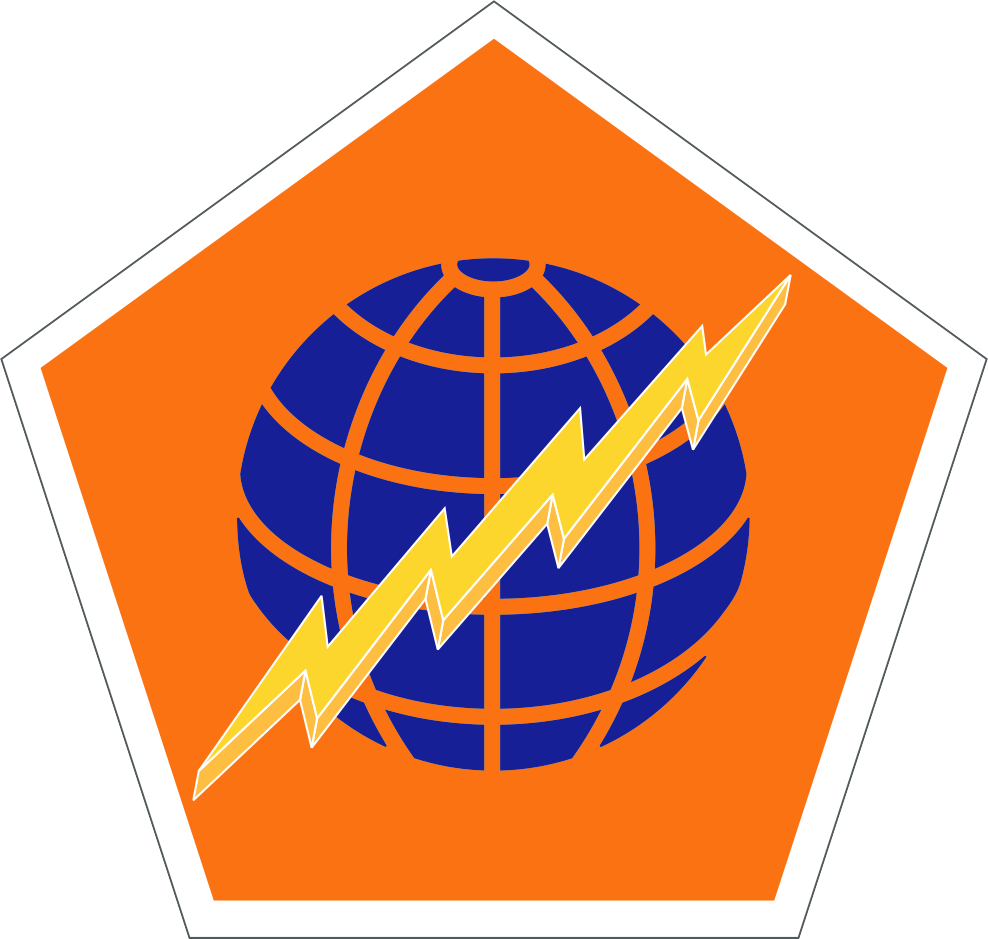
505th Signal Brigade

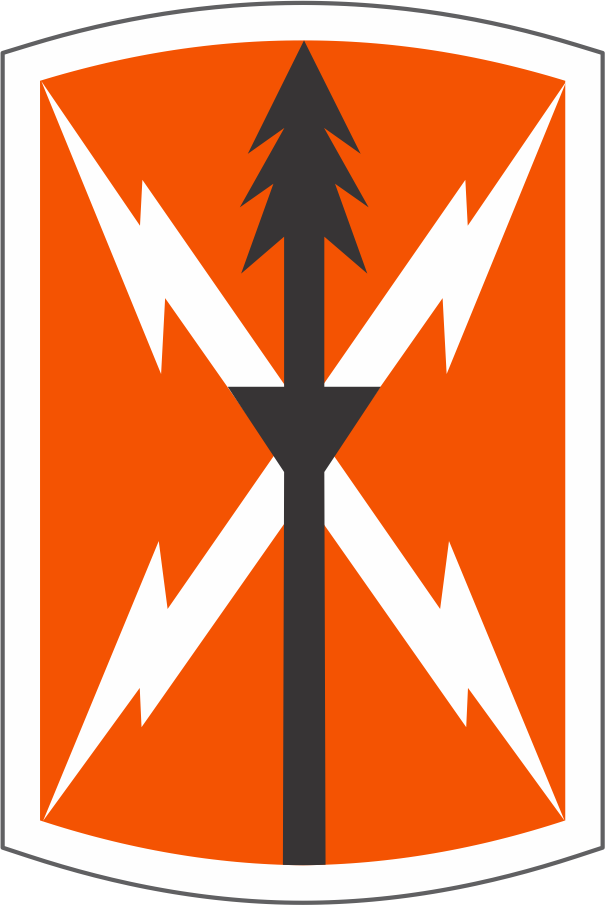
516th Signal Brigade

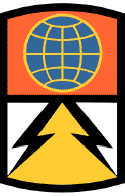
1108th Signal Brigade

== Support Brigades ==
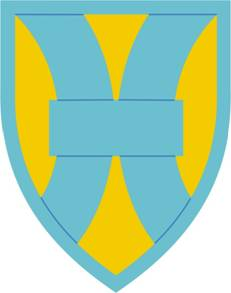
1st Support Brigade
Now is the 21st Theater Sustainment Command

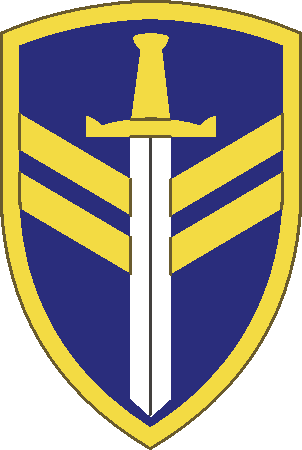
2nd Support Brigade became 2nd Support Command Inactive

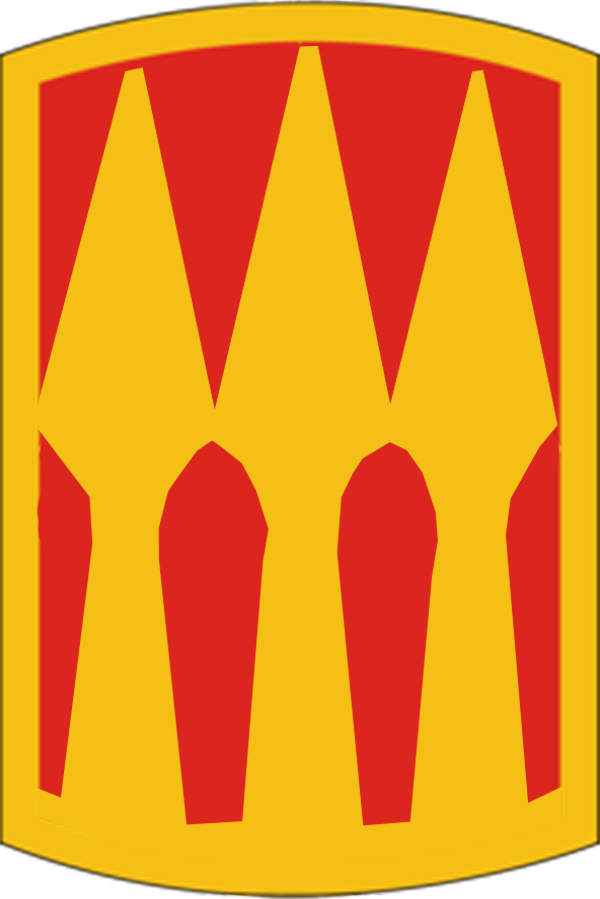
3rd Support Brigade Inactive

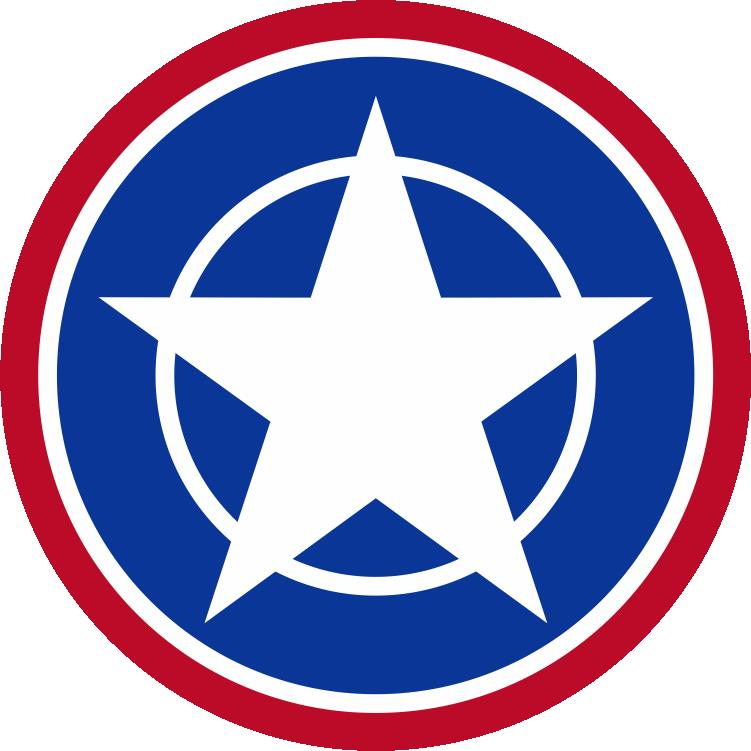
12th Support Brigade

13th Support Brigade
Now is the 13th Sustainment Command (Expeditionary)

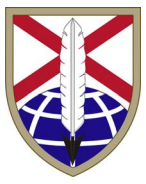
279th Army Field Support Brigade

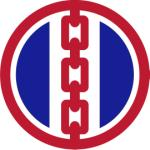
301st Support Brigade Now is the 301st Regional Support Group

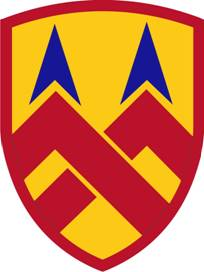
337th Support Brigade
Now is the 377th Theater Sustainment Command

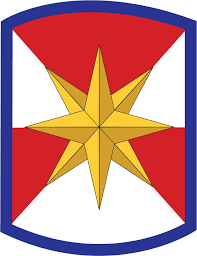
347th Regional Support Group

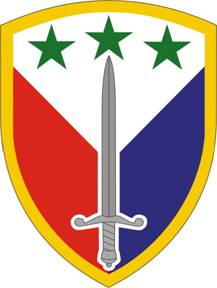
402nd Army Field Support Brigade

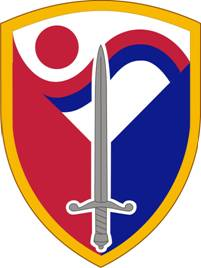
403rd Army Field Support Brigade

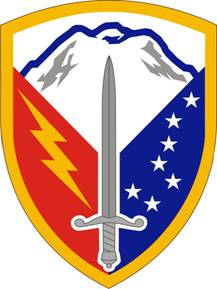
404th Army Field Support Brigade

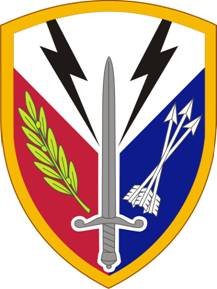
405th Army Field Support Brigade

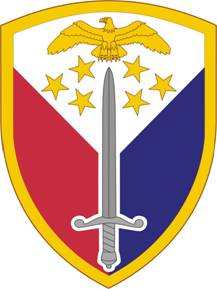
406th Army Field Support Brigade

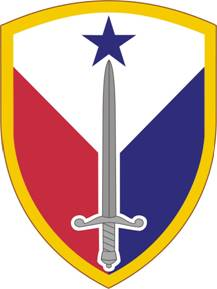
407th Army Field Support Brigade

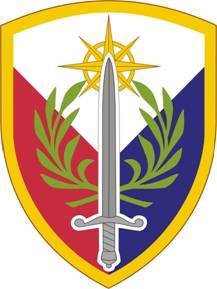
408th Contracting Support Brigade

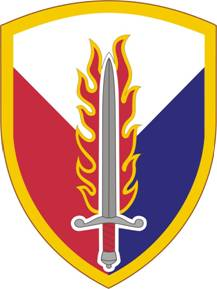
409th Contracting Support Brigade

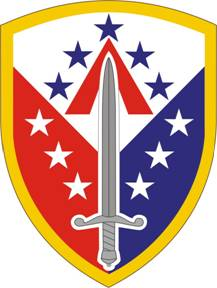
410th Contracting Support Brigade

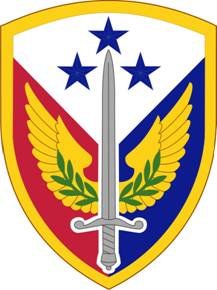
412th Contracting Support Brigade 2009-2017

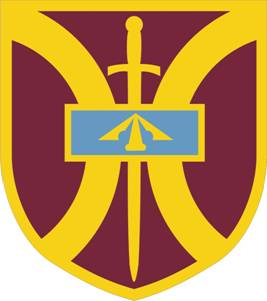
916th Support Brigade

== Sustainment Brigades ==
1st Sustainment Brigade

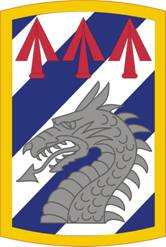
3rd Sustainment Brigade

4th Sustainment Brigade

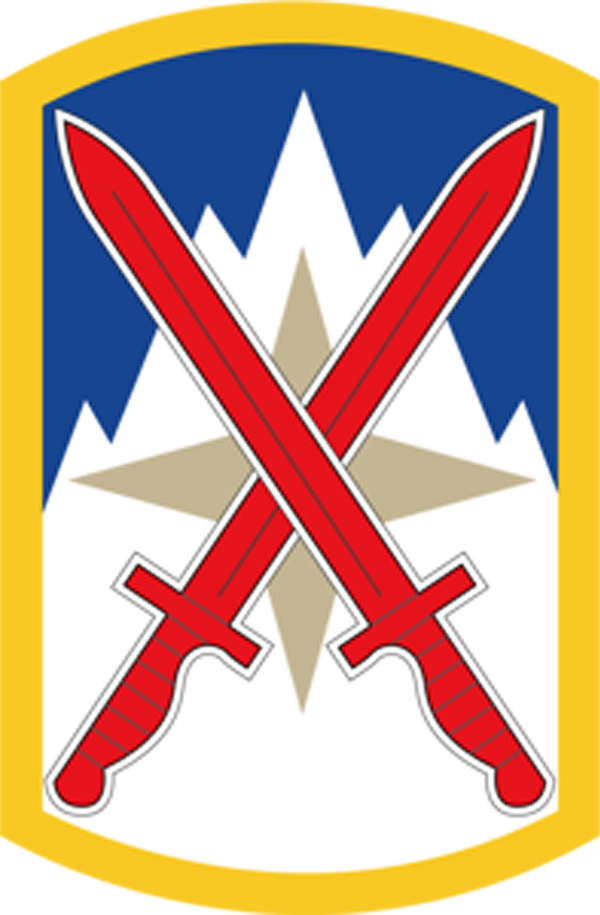
10th Sustainment Brigade

15th Sustainment Brigade is now 1st Armored Division Sustainment Brigade

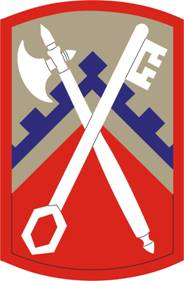
16th Sustainment Brigade

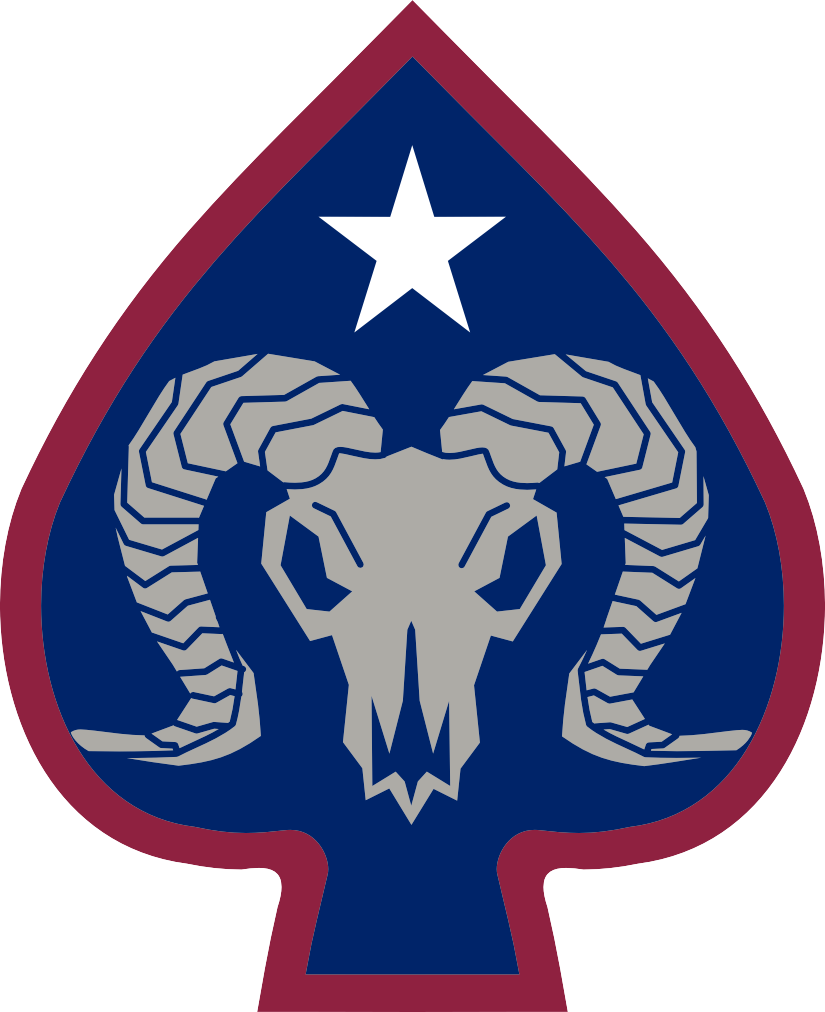
17th Sustainment Brigade

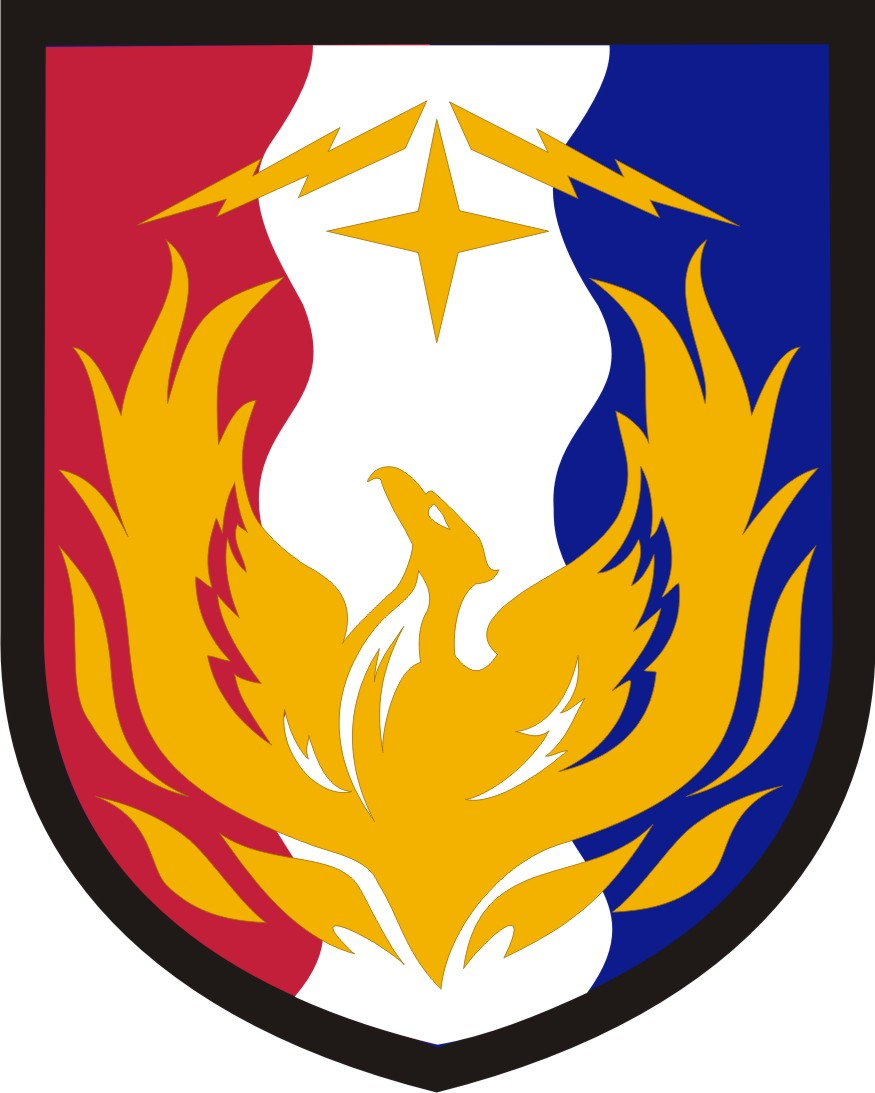
36th Sustainment Brigade

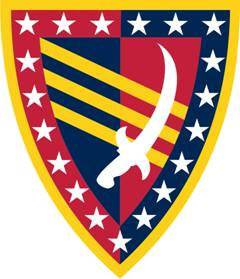
38th Sustainment Brigade

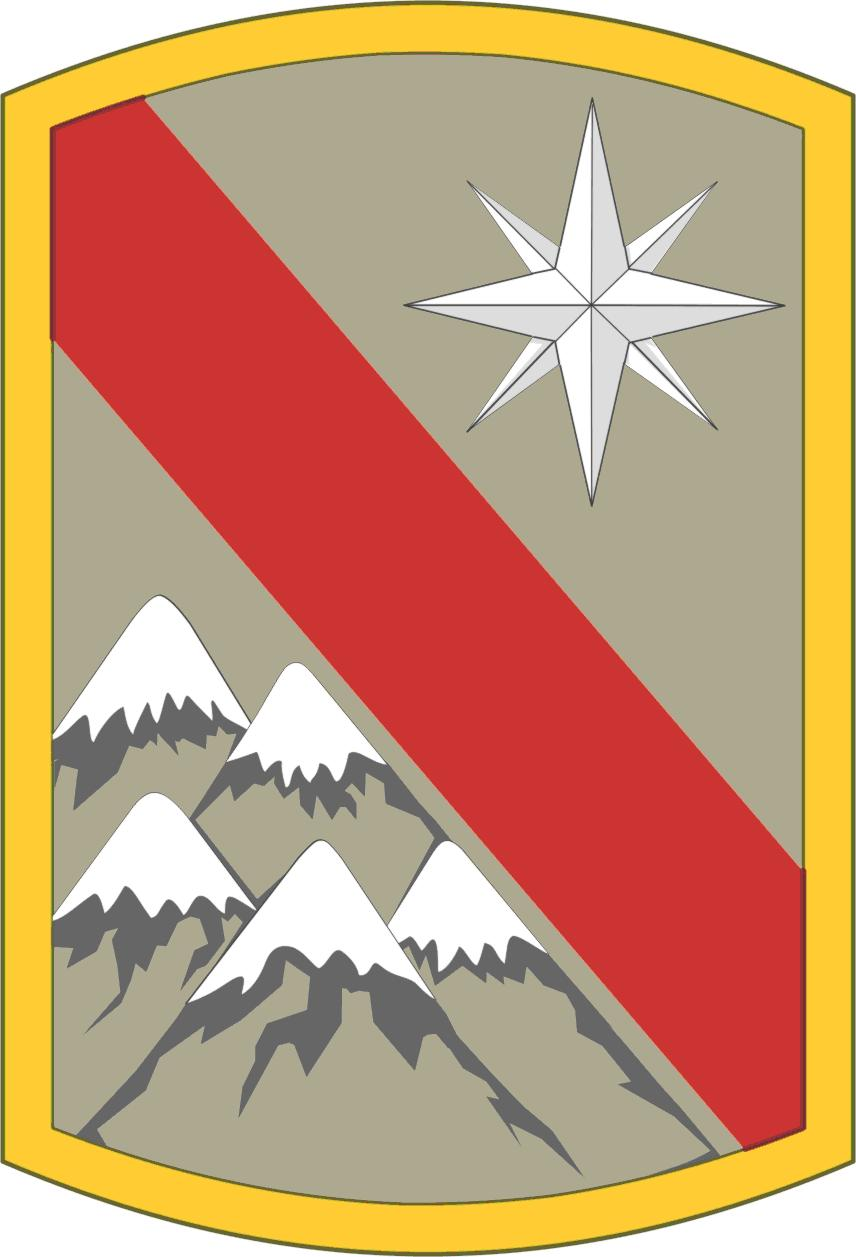
43rd Sustainment Brigade

45th Sustainment Brigade

55th Sustainment Brigade

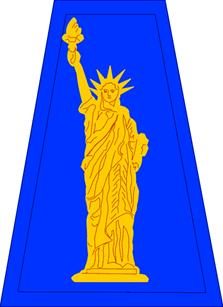
77th Sustainment Brigade

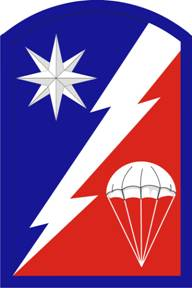
82nd Sustainment Brigade

89th Sustainment Brigade

90th Sustainment Brigade

96th Sustainment Brigade

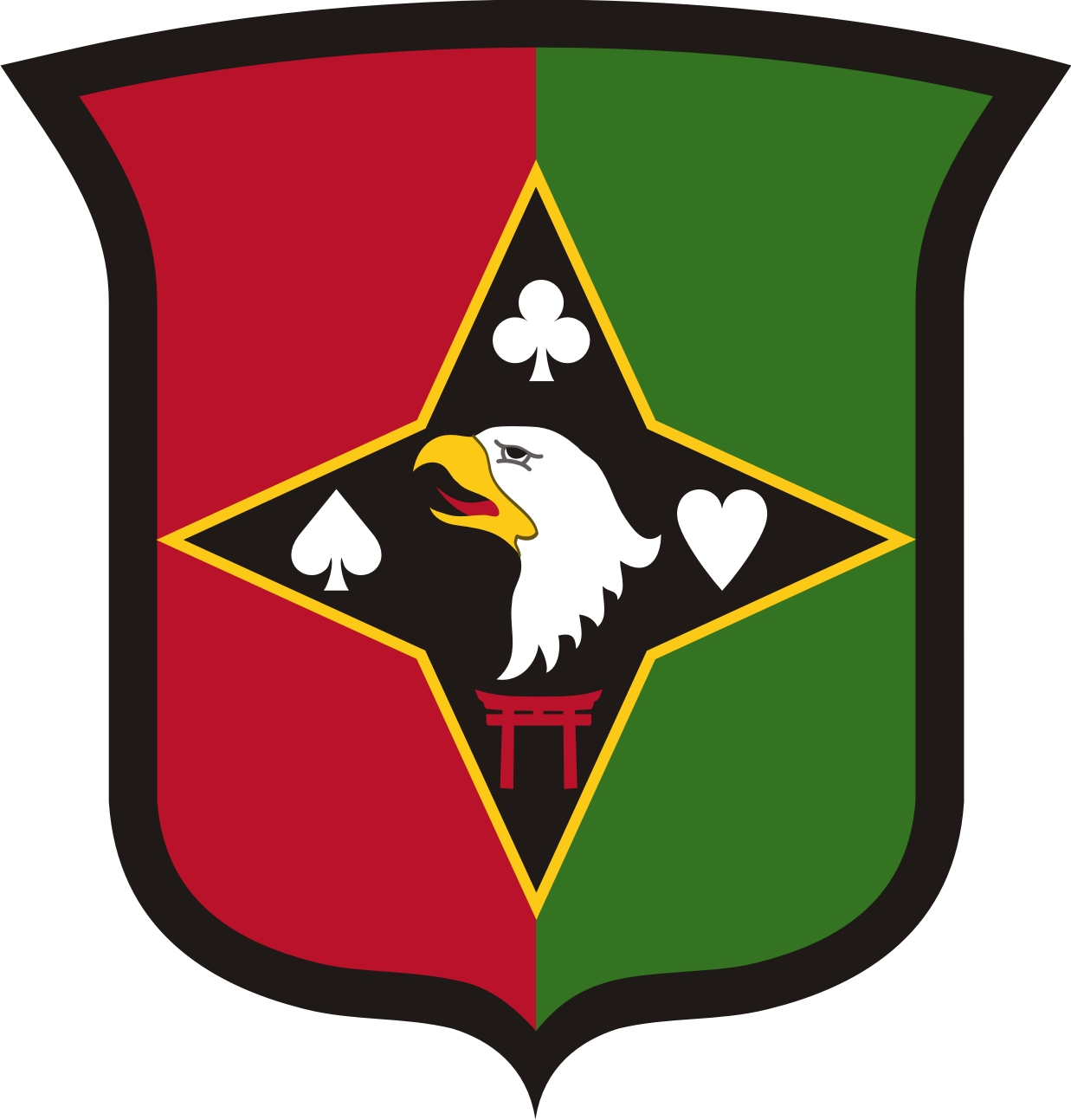
101st Sustainment Brigade

108th Sustainment Brigade

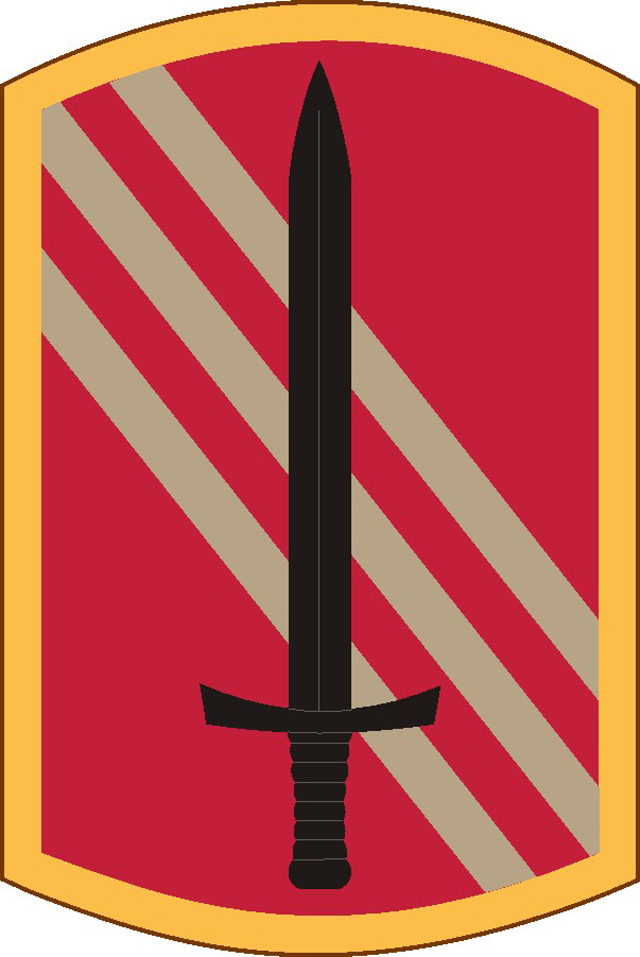
113th Sustainment Brigade

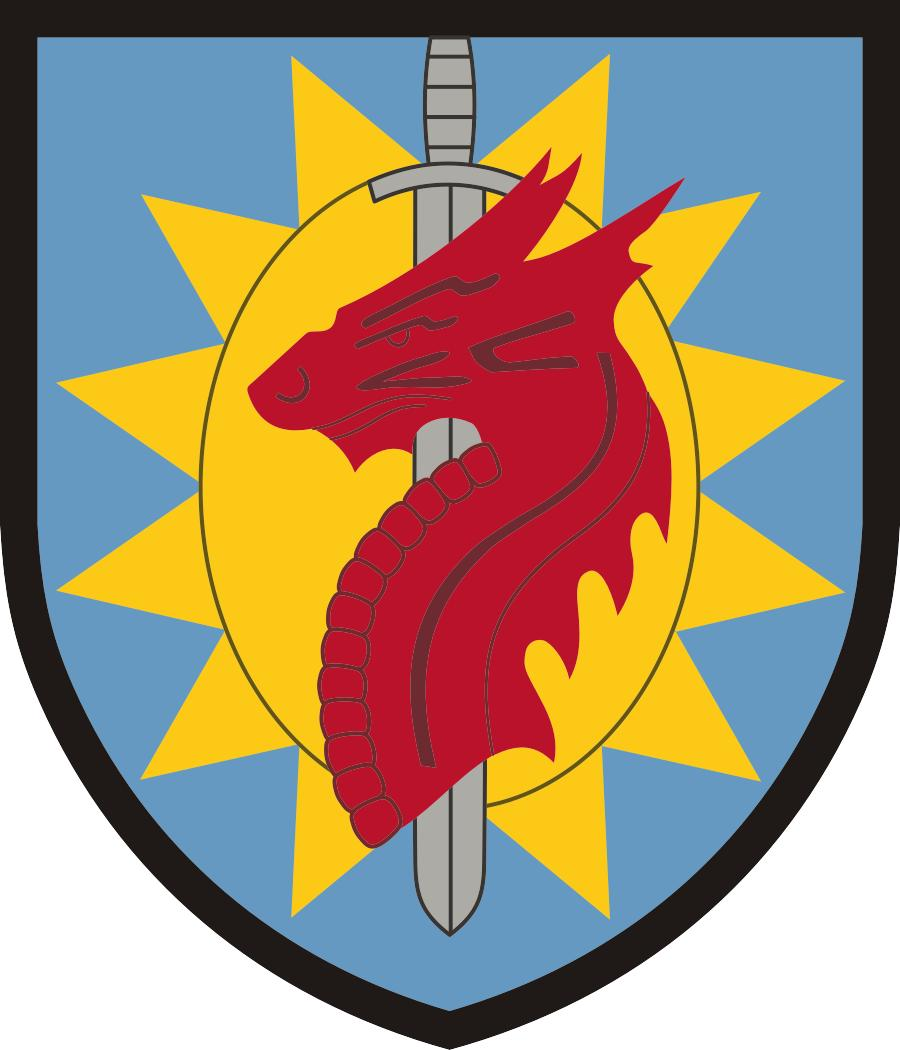
224th Sustainment Brigade

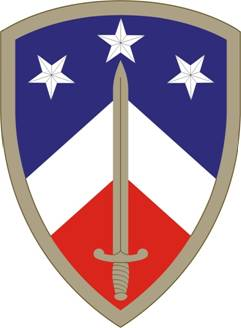
230th Sustainment Brigade

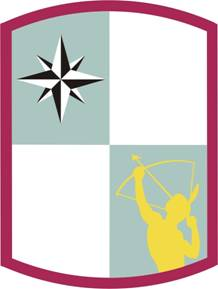
287th Sustainment Brigade

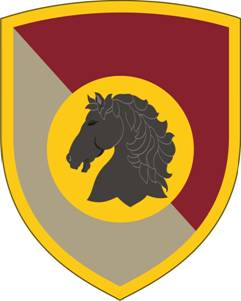
300th Sustainment Brigade

304th Sustainment Brigade

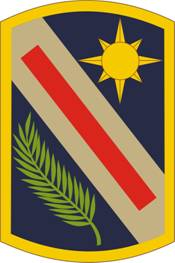
321st Sustainment Brigade

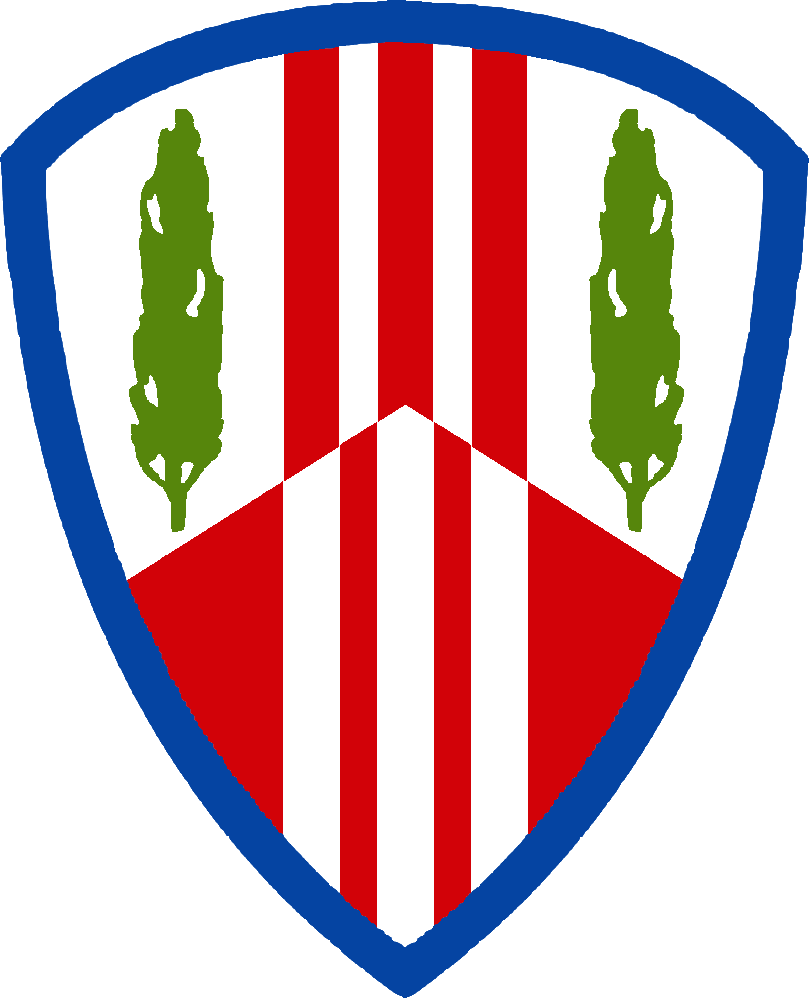
369th Sustainment Brigade

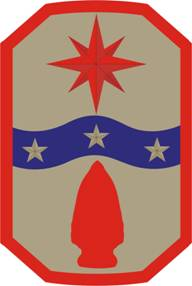
371st Sustainment Brigade

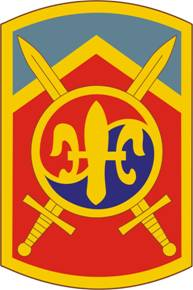
501st Sustainment Brigade

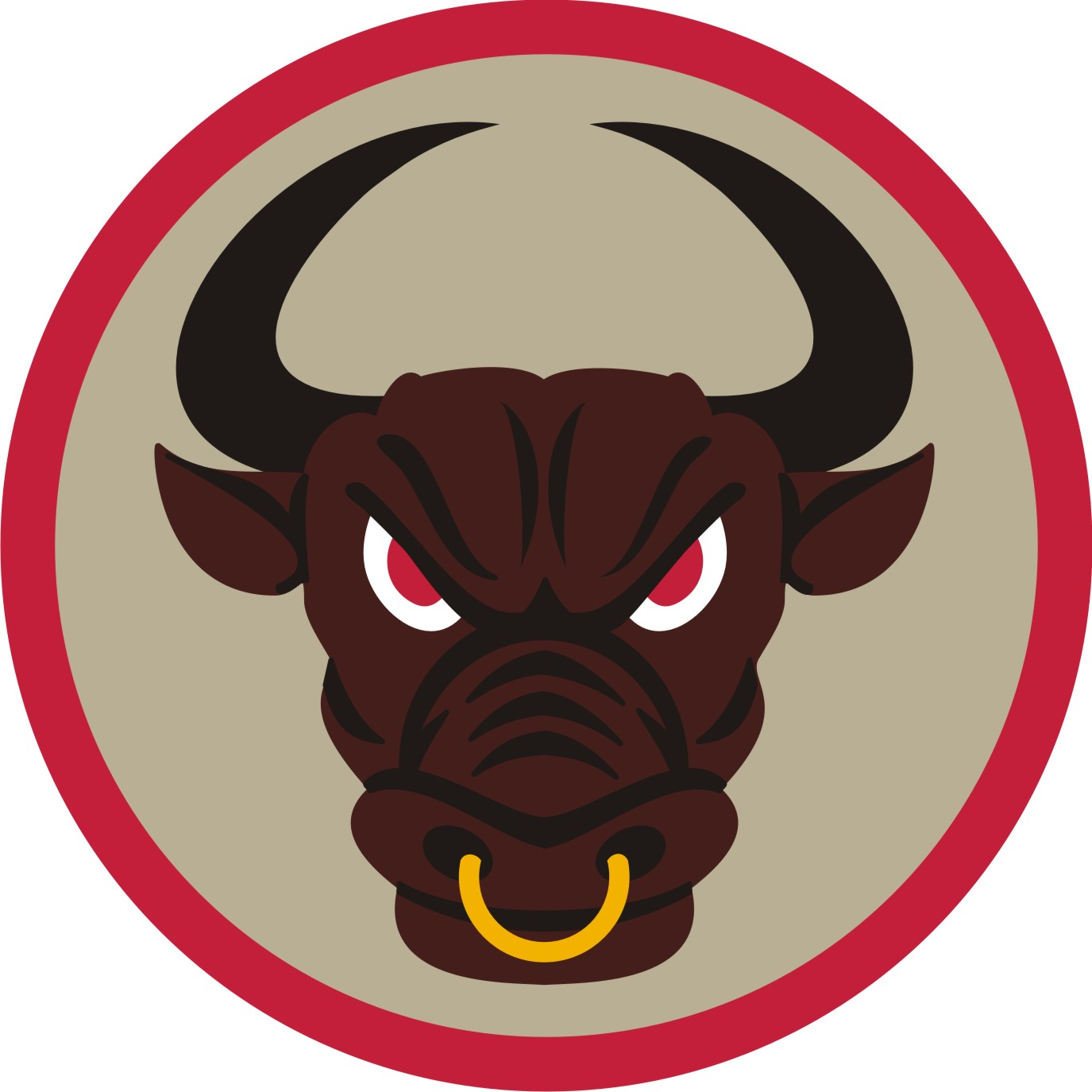
518th Sustainment Brigade

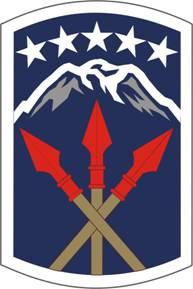
593rd Sustainment Brigade
(Now 593rd Expeditionary Sustainment Command)

== Transportation Brigades ==
3rd Transportation Brigade (Expeditionary)

4th Transportation Brigade (Redesignated for the 4th Transportation Command)

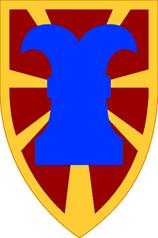
7th Transportation Brigade (Expeditionary)

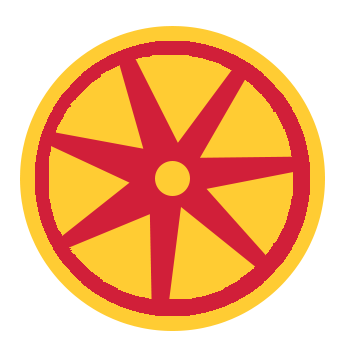
107th Transportation Brigade

143rd Transportation Brigade
Later was 143rd Transportation Command
Now is the 143rd Sustainment Command (Expeditionary)

184th Transportation Brigade
(Now 184th Sustainment Command (Expeditionary))

319th Transportation Brigade

425th Transportation Brigade

== See also ==
- Field army insignia of the United States Army
- Corps insignia of the United States Army
- Division insignia of the United States Army
- Miscellaneous shoulder sleeve insignia of the United States Army
- Obsolete shoulder sleeve insignia of the United States Army
- Miscellaneous United States Army coats of arms
