= Army Network Enterprise Technology Command =

Computer networking formation in U.S. Army Cyber Command

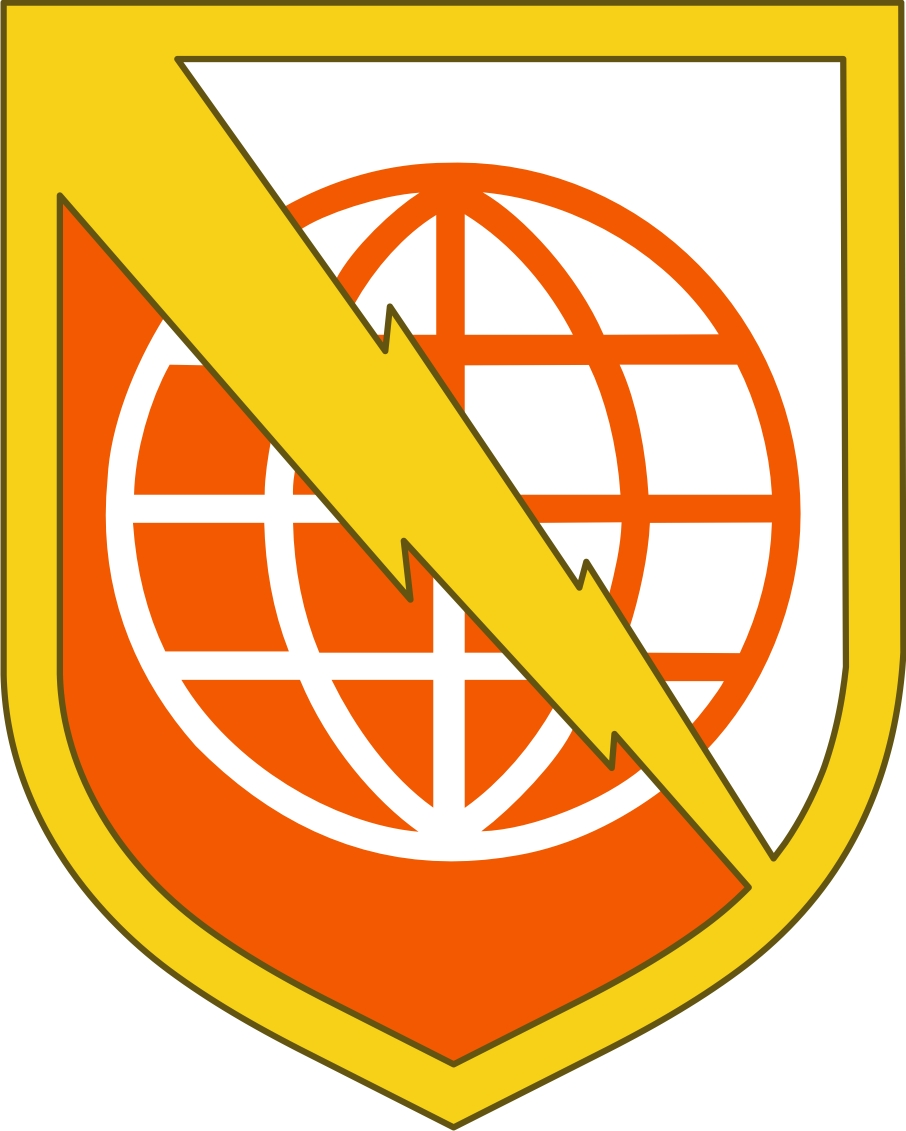
- NETCOM SSI
- Active: 1 October 2002 – current
- Country: United States
- Branch: United States Army
- Type: Signal command
- Part of: U.S. Army Cyber Command
- Garrison/HQ: Fort Huachuca, Arizona
- Website: www.army.mil/info/organization/unitsandcommands/commandstructure/netcom/

Commanders
- Current commander: Major General Jacqueline D. McPhail

Insignia
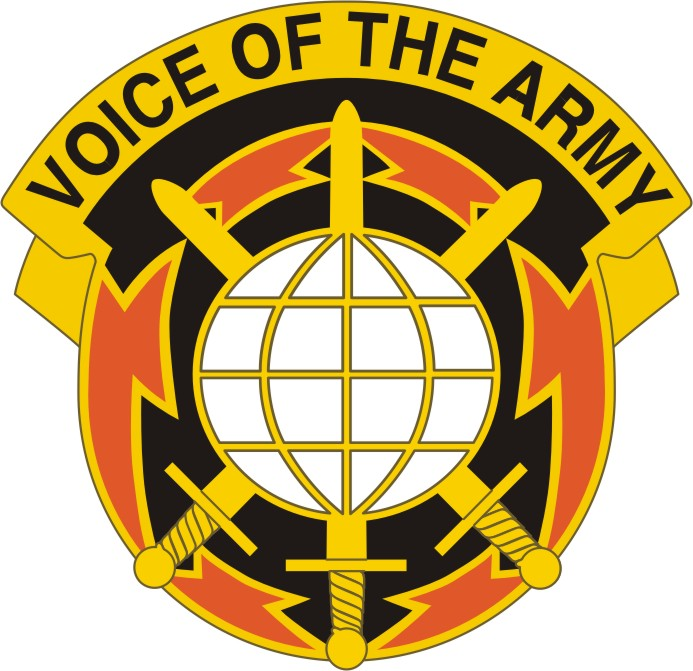
- NETCOM Distinctive unit insignia

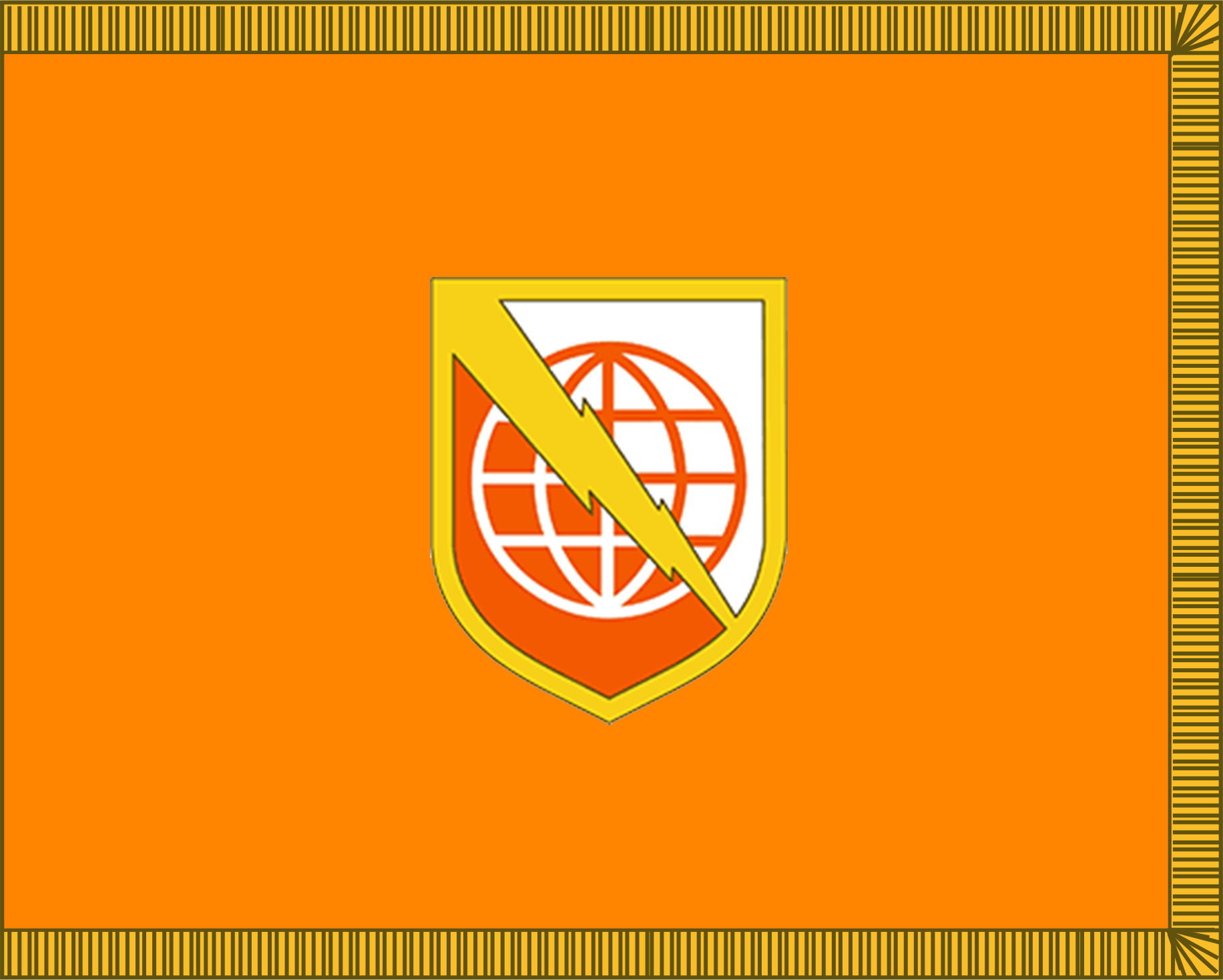
- Network Enterprise Technology Command Flag

United States Army Network Enterprise Technology Command (NETCOM) is a US Military unit subordinate to United States Army Cyber Command. NETCOM's mission is to operate and defend the computer networks of the United States Army. The numerical command for NETCOM was 9th Army Signal Command, though this distinction was removed on 1 October 2011. Its heritage can be traced back to the creation of the 9th Service Company in 1918. The command headquarters is at Fort Huachuca, Arizona. Major General Jacqueline D. McPhail assumed command of NETCOM in August 2024.

== Mission ==
NETCOM plans, engineers, installs, integrates, protects and operates Army Cyberspace, enabling Mission Command through all phases of Joint, Interagency, Intergovernmental and Multinational operations. Additionally, the commanding general is designated as the Deputy Commanding General for Network Operations, U.S. Army Cyber Command. With the headquarters at Fort Huachuca, Arizona, the NETCOM Team has nearly 16,000 Soldiers, Department of the Army Civilians and Contractors stationed and deployed in more than 22 countries around the world, providing direct and indirect support to Army, Joint and Coalition forces.

== History ==
=== U.S. Army Strategic Communications Command ===
On 1 February 1945, the 9423rd Technical Services Unit - War Department Signal Center was organized at the Pentagon in Virginia. Two years later, it was redesignated the U.S. Army Command and Administrative Communications Agency by the War Department. The title was simplified to the U.S. Army Communications Agency (ACA) in 1957. On 1 April 1962, the Army Communications Agency merged with the U.S. Army Signal Engineering Agency to form the U.S. Army Strategic Communications Command, (USASTRATCOM). The command was "charged with the engineering, installation, operation and maintenance of the Army’s portion of the Defense Communications Agency’s global communications network." In December 1962 the Command became the Army proponent for the newly-established National Communications System.

On 1 March 1964 the office of Chief Signal Officer of the United States Army was abolished. His remaining operational responsibilities were assigned to the previously existing Class II activity, the US Army Strategic Communications Command (STRATCOM). STRATCOM was elevated into a major command to exercise full control over worldwide strategic communications. It was commanded by a major general. The strategic communications command installed, maintained, and operated all the Army's long-distance networks, which it took over from the chief signal officer. It also absorbed the Joint Communication Agency at Fort Richie, Maryland, the US Army Interagency Communications Agency at Winchester, Virginia, the US Army Signal Radio Propagation Agency at Fort Monmouth, New Jersey, and the US Army Signal Communications Security Agency.

The first subordinate command USSTRATCOM formed was STRATCOM-Europe, established 1 July 1964, in Schwetzingen, West Germany. STRATCOM-Europe absorbed 22nd and 106th Signal Groups and other communications responsibilities from USAREUR. By the end of 1965, all USAREUR communications duties, and even the position of USAREUR Deputy Chief of Staff for Communications–Electronics, had been transferred to STRATCOM-Europe. Changes in signals/military communications continued through the 1970s; 7th Signal Brigade was activated in 1970 from assets of the deactivated Seventh Army communications command. STRATCOM-Europe assumed operational control of the brigade in June 1972 and was redesignated as Army Communications Command-Europe (ACC-E) in October 1973. The 106th and 516th Signal Groups were also inactivated during this time and replaced by the 4th Signal Group.

STRATCOM established the 1st Signal Brigade to exercise command and control over all Army communications-electronics resources in Southeast Asia. Scattered among 200 sites in Vietnam and Thailand, this brigade became the largest combat signal unit ever formed. One of those units (formed in April 1969 until July that year), aided in the installation of modern communications equipment in Bang Phi, Thailand; improving the information networks for Southeast Asia.

=== U.S. Army Communications Command ===
STRATCOM leaders moved to modify the command's designation to better suit its changing mission by dropping "strategic" from its organizational title. On 1 Oct. 1973, the Army re-designated STRATCOM as the U.S. Army Communications Command (USACC).

After "the U.S. Army entered the aviation field, [USACC] assumed the air traffic control (ATC) mission. This mission included traffic control, on-site navigation aids maintenance, support maintenance, and antennae maintenance." The mission remained in place until 1986. That year, with the creation of the United States Army Aviation Branch, all of the four missions were reassigned except for antennae maintenance. "The 7th Signal Command, who owned the antennae teams, continued to provide this service."

During the early 1980s, Army automation focused on the development of hardware and software systems. These systems were used for force development, personnel, supply, payroll, medical, maintenance, and troop support. Due to the scale of the work, the Army empowered USACC to lead development of strategic concepts for information systems management. USACC recommendations, combined with an Army Chief of Staff vision of consolidated information disciplines, gave genesis to the U.S. Army Information Systems Command (USAISC), the newest iteration of Fort Huachuca's strategic communications organization, on 1 May 1984.

=== Downsizing after the Cold War ===
Post Desert Storm Army downsizing and organizational review focused a critical eye on command structure. A general perception in the 1990s among major commands and theater commanders held that USAISC central management deprived them of needed command and control over regional and theater information systems, computer system acquisitions, and signal assets. The Department of the Army agreed and moved to dismantle USAISC, relegating the organization to major subordinate command status under U.S. Army Forces Command, and re-designating it as U.S. Army Signal Command (USASC) in September 1996.

=== U.S. Army Signal Command ===
Army MACOMs and theater commanders worked independently to resource their own Information System requirements. This decentralization and deregulation led to a proliferation of non-standardized command, control, communications, and computer (C4) systems and an unacceptable level of incompatibility among Army-wide communications equipment and support networks.

The department of the Army on 1 Oct. 2002, decided to again centralize service C4 and many aspects of information systems management and security under one Army command: the U.S. Army Network Enterprise Technology Command (NETCOM), reporting directly to the Army's Cyber Command (ARCYBER).

=== Mobile and Expeditionary Network ===
The Network cross-functional team (CFT) and the Program Executive Office Command, Control, Communications—Tactical (PEO C3T) hosted a forum on 1 August 2018 for vendors to learn what might function as a testable/deployable Army Network in the near future. A few of the hundreds of white papers from the vendors, adjudged to be 'very mature ideas', were passed to the Army's acquisition community, while many others were passed to CERDEC for continuation in the Army's effort to modernize the network for combat. In 2018, the brigades are transitioning from at-the-halt Tactical Network Transport to on-the-move systems.

== Organization ==
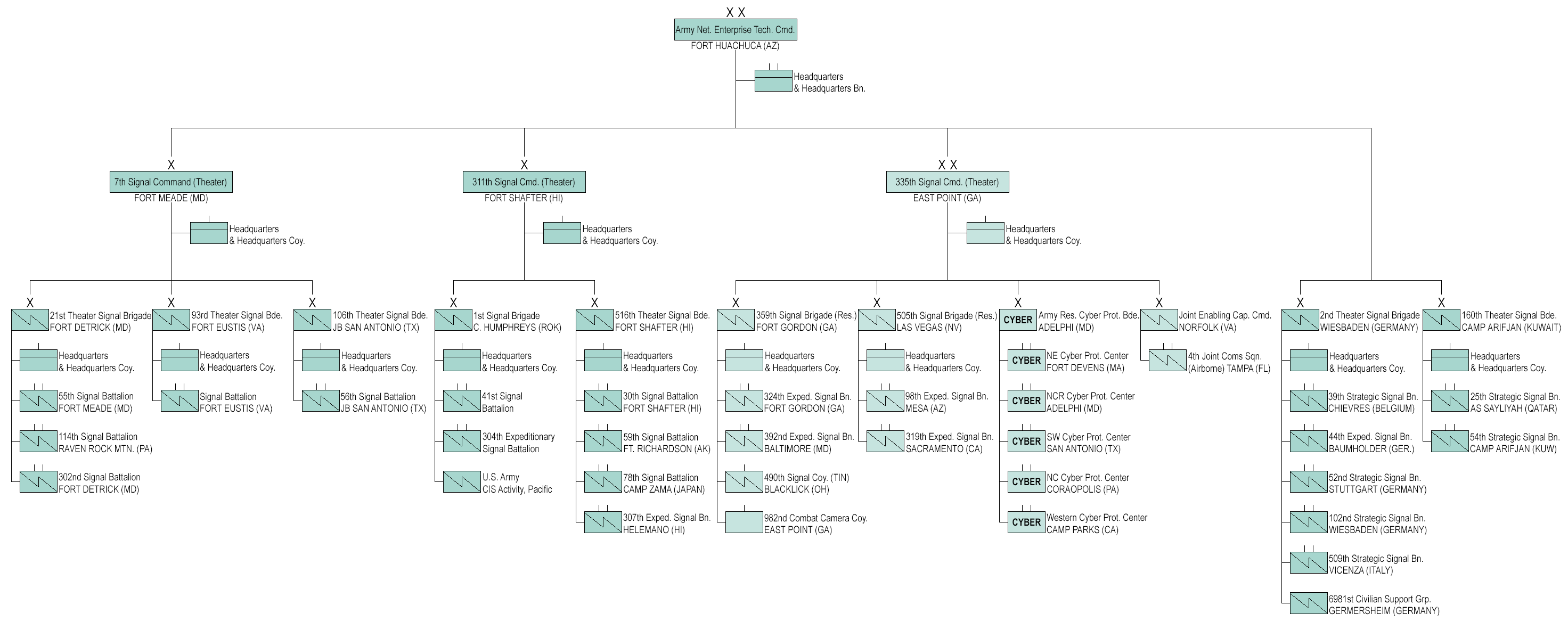
Army Network Enterprise Technology Command organization 2025

- Army Network Enterprise Technology Command, at Fort Huachuca (AZ)
  - 7th Signal Command (Theater) (Continental United States), at Fort Meade (MD)
    - 21st Theater Signal Brigade, at Fort Detrick (MD)
    - 93rd Theater Signal Brigade (Eastern US), at Fort Eustis (VA)
    - 106th Theater Signal Brigade (Western US), at Joint Base San Antonio (TX)
  - 311th Signal Command (Theater) (Indo-Pacific), at Fort Shafter (HI)
    - 1st Signal Brigade, at Camp Humphreys (South Korea) — supports Eighth Army
    - 516th Theater Signal Brigade, at Fort Shafter (HI) — supports US Army Pacific
  - 335th Signal Command (Theater) (US Army Reserve), in East Point (GA)
    - 359th Signal Brigade, at Fort Gordon (GA)
    - 505th Signal Brigade, in Las Vegas (NV)
    - Army Reserve Cyber Protection Brigade, in Adelphi (MD)
    - Joint Enabling Capabilities Command–Army Reserve Element, in Norfolk (VA)
  - 2nd Theater Signal Brigade, in Wiesbaden (Germany) — supports US Army Europe
  - 160th Theater Signal Brigade, at Camp Arifjan (Kuwait) — supports US Army Central
  - US Army Signal Activity-Intelligence and Security Command, at Fort Belvoir (VA)

== List of commanders ==
- MG Carroll F. Pollett
- MG Susan S. Lawrence, 2010
- MG Jennifer L. Napper, 22 September 2010
- MG Alan R. Lynn, 9 August 2012
- BG Peter A. Gallagher, August 2013
- MG John B. Morrison, 2 April 2014
- MG John W. Baker, 10 August 2016
- MG Maria Barrett, 14 November 2018
- MG Christopher L. Eubank, 19 April 2022
- MG Jacqueline D. McPhail, 7 August 2024

== See also ==
- 9th Army Signal Command (United States)
- U.S. Army Cyber Command
- U. S. Army Signal Corps
- U.S. Cyber Command
