= 9th Army Signal Command (United States) =

Signal command of the Network Enterprise Technology Command, U.S. Army

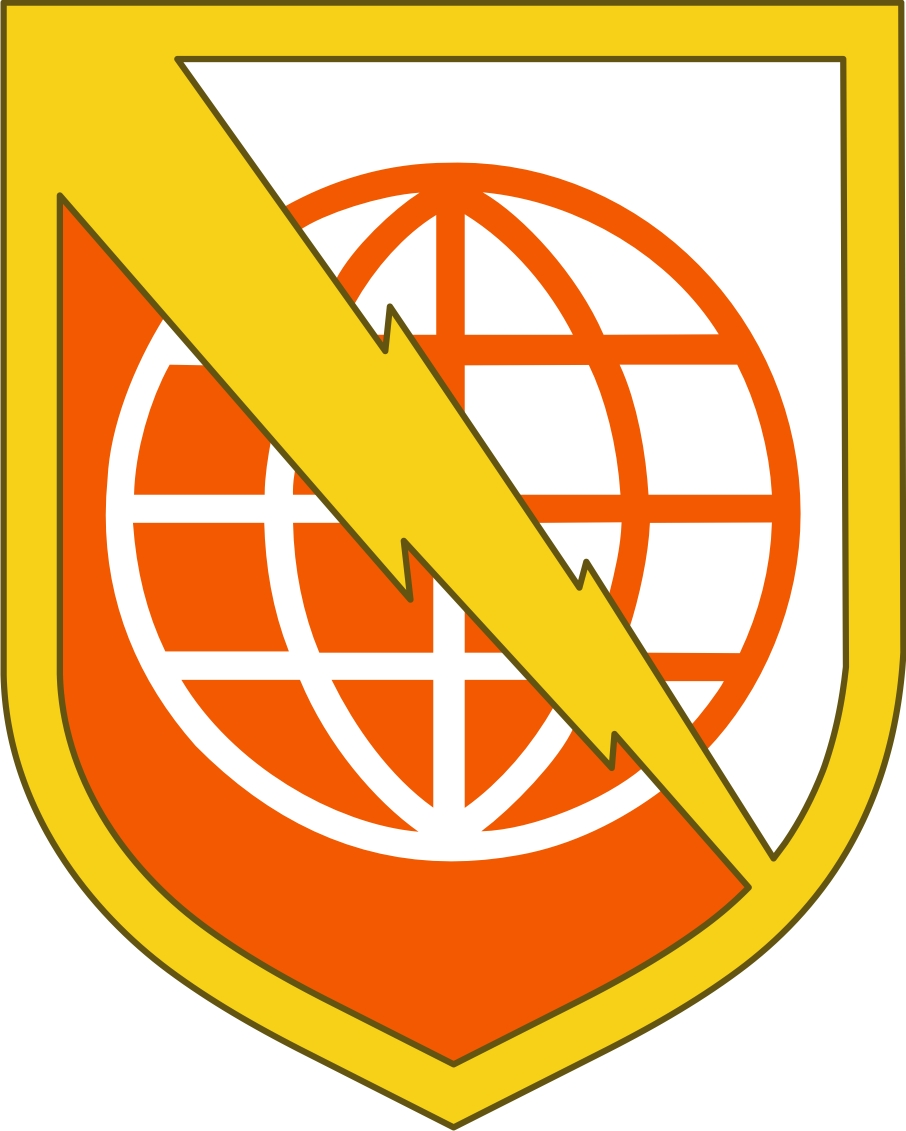
- NETCOM/9th SC(A) Shoulder Sleeve Insignia
- Active: 16 September 1997 – present
- Country: United States
- Branch: U.S. Army
- Type: Signal Command
- Garrison/HQ: Fort Huachuca, Arizona
- Website: NETCOM Home Page

Commanders
- Current commander: Major General Alan R. Lynn

Insignia
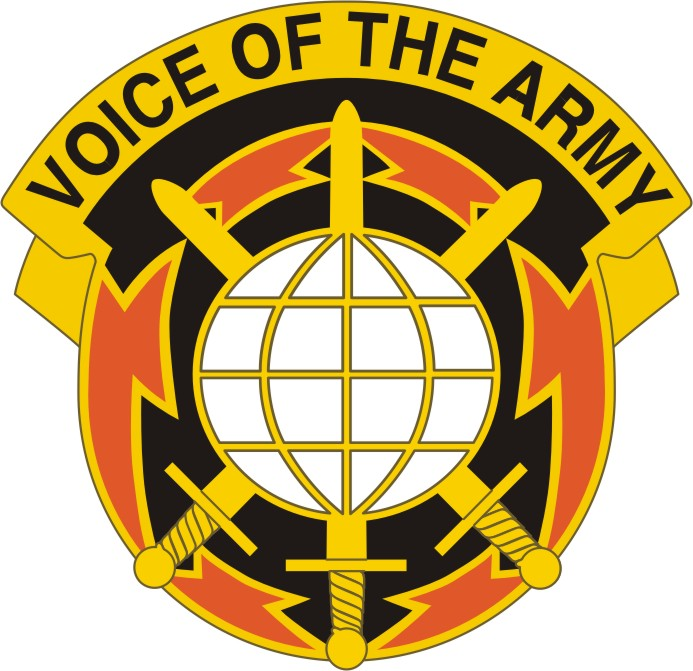
- 9th Signal Command DUI

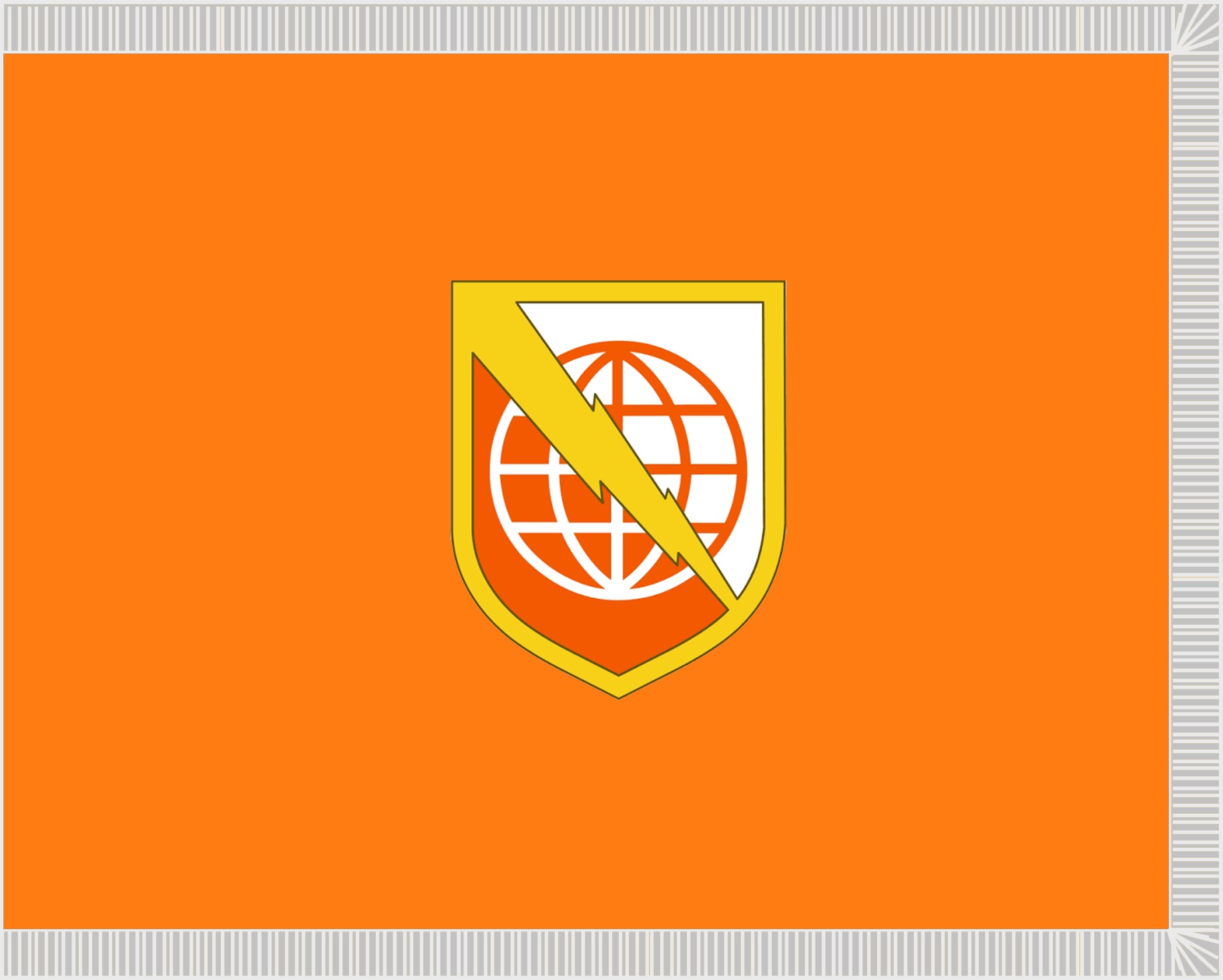
- 9th Signal Command Flag

The 9th Army Signal Command is the operational executive agent for Army-wide network operations and security. It is the single point of contact for Army network development and protection, providing C4 information management of common-user services in support of the combatant commanders and Army service component commanders. It was the numbered command for the Network Enterprise Technology Command.

== History ==
NETCOM/9th ASC inherits its name from the 9th Service Company, originally formed, 14 February 1918. It was organized two months later in Honolulu, Hawaii. The command mission was the installation and maintenance of telegraph, telephone and coastal artillery fire control communications. Its organizational structure consisted of a captain, five corporals and 15 Private First Class soldiers. The commands soldiers also served on Oahu at a number of commands including Fort Shafter, Schofield Barracks, Fort Ruger, Fort Armstrong, Fort Kamehameha, Hickam Field, Luke Field and Tripler General Hospital.

The 9th Signal Service Company moved its unit headquarters from Honolulu to Fort Shafter in 1921. The command became responsible for heavy cable construction within the Hawaiian Department. In May 1929, the 9th Signal started passing radio traffic with the mainland and Manila. In August 1930, 9th Signal established direct radio links with the War Department station in Washington, D.C..

=== World War II ===
Signal operations at Fort Shafter started to expand after the Japanese attack on Pearl Harbor. In 1942, the 9th Signal Service Company began to send radio operators out to Christmas, Canton, and Fanning Islands. It also supplied radio operators for transports sailing between San Francisco and Hawaii and for inter-island vessels sailing in Hawaiian waters.

In April 1943, the unit was redesignated as the 972nd Signal Service Company. On 8 January 1944, it was reorganized as a battalion and designated as the 972nd Signal Service Battalion. Its manning had increased to 643 personnel. The unit had also been reassigned to U.S. Army Forces, Central Pacific Area. The expansion of the offensive in the Pacific and the growth in signal requirements required reallocation of theater signal resources. The 972nd Signal Service Battalion became the "wire battalion." Its mission was to furnish personnel capable of handling the installation and maintenance of communications for the Wire Division of the Signal Office, Central Pacific Area. Major elements of the battalion were employed on the Island of Oahu and detachments were set up on the Islands of Hawaii, Maui and Kauai.

The Central Pacific Base Command awarded the 972nd Signal Service Battalion the Meritorious Service Unit Plaque for the period 1 March 1945, to 30 April 1945. The battalion also earned the Central Pacific campaign streamer for the period 1941–1943. The battalion's Signal Photographic Detachment was awarded the Eastern Mandates campaign streamer.

=== Post-war ===
In January 1947, the battalion was reorganized, having increased in strength to 760. A Headquarters Detachment, and Companies A and B were added to the battalion. In June 1948, the battalion was again reorganized, adding a headquarters company to replace the headquarters detachment. At the end of 1948, post war organizational reductions in force brought the first of several inactivations for the battalion at Fort Shafter, Territory of Hawaii.

In May 1958, the Chief of Signal ordered the 972nd Signal Battalion back to active service at Tobyhanna Signal Depot, Pennsylvania. It was activated on 14 May 1958, as the 972nd Signal Battalion (Supply and Maintenance). The unit consisted of only a headquarters element with no assigned companies. In July 1962, the 972nd was reassigned from the Chief Signal Officer to Second United States Army. In May 1965, it reorganized from a headquarters detachment to a headquarters company.

=== Vietnam ===
In August 1965, the 972nd was alerted for overseas duty in South Vietnam. It was attached to the U. S. Army Support Command and located at Qui Nhon. The unit operated signal depots, supply and maintenance points September 1965 to October 1967. The 972nd was inactivated on 20 October 1967, only to be activated again at Fort Lewis, Washington in May 1968. Its soldiers trained for a five months, culminating in the unit's second deployment to Vietnam in October.

The newly organized 972nd Signal Battalion arrived at Long Binh, Vietnam, on 29 October 1968, assigned to the 2nd Signal Group, 1st Signal Brigade, U.S. Army Strategic Communications Command. It provided contingency communications support throughout the Republic of Vietnam. In November 1968, the 107th Signal Company (Support) was assigned to the battalion. Later that month, the 972nd gained the 267th Signal Company (Cable Construction) and the 327th Signal Company (Radio Relay).

During October 1969, the battalion transferred control of the 267th and 327th Signal Companies to the 39th Signal Battalion, 2nd Signal Group. The command was preparing for another inactivation. In October, the 107th Signal Company was released for redeployment to the United States. In late November 1969, the Army inactivated the 972nd as part of the redeployment of U.S. Army Forces from South Vietnam.

During Vietnam, the battalion earned ten Vietnam campaign streamers. U.S. Army Vietnam also awarded the 972nd with its second Meritorious Unit Commendation.

== Re-activation as 9th Army Signal Command ==
For the next 28 years, the unit remained dormant on the Army's inactive list. On 16 September 1997, the unit was reactivated as Headquarters and Headquarters Company, 9th Army Signal Command (ASC), a major subordinate command assigned to U.S. Army Forces Command. 1 Oct. 2002, the Army re-designated the 9th Army Signal Command as the United States Army Network Enterprise Technology Command and the 9th Army Signal Command (NETCOM/9th ASC). On 1 October 2010, 9th Signal Command (Army) became a subordinate command to ARCYBER, Second Army. In 2017 Second Army was inactivated.

== See also ==
- Network Enterprise Technology Command
- U.S. Army Cyber Command
- U.S. Army Signal Corps
- U.S. Cyber Command
