= 362nd Division =

362nd Division may refer to:

- 362nd Infantry Division, Wehrmacht, Germany
- 362nd Rifle Division, Soviet Union

== See also ==
- List of military divisions by number
- 362nd (disambiguation)
