= 335th Signal Command (Theater) =

Signal command within the U.S. Army Reserve Command

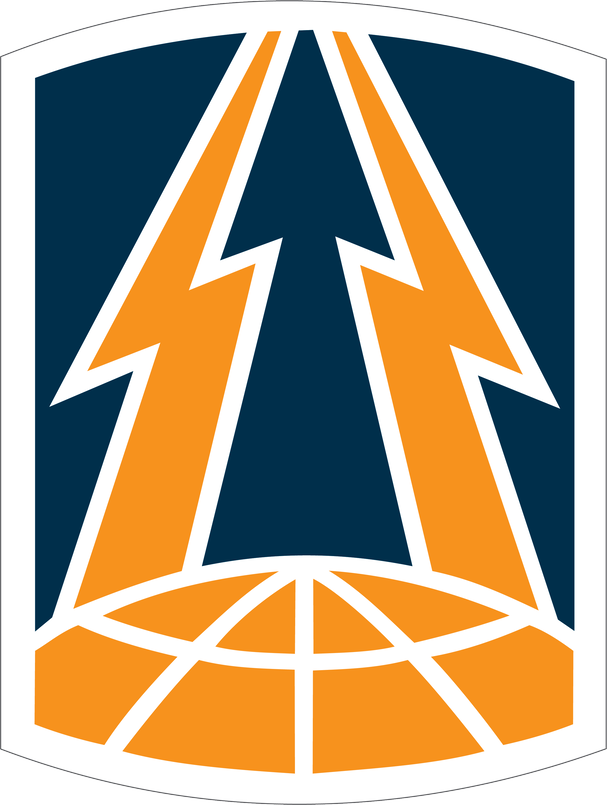
- 335th Theater Signal Command shoulder sleeve insignia
- Active: Activated February 1953 as the 335th Signal Group; Redesignated as 335th Signal Brigade, October 1984; Redesignated 335th Signal Command, August 1986–present
- Country: United States
- Allegiance: NETCOM
- Branch: United States Army Reserve
- Type: Operational and Functional Command
- Role: Signals
- Part of: United States Army Reserve Command
- Garrison/HQ: East Point, Georgia
- Motto: "Ready Lightning"
- Colors: Orange, White and Blue
- Anniversaries: Activated 1953 as the 335th Signal Group
- Engagements: Vietnam War; Desert Shield; Desert Storm; Operation Enduring Freedom; Operation Iraqi Freedom; Operation Atlantic Resolve; Operation Inherent Resolve

Commanders
- Current commander: MG Jan C. Norris
- Command Sergeant Major: CSM William T. Padgelek Jr.

Insignia
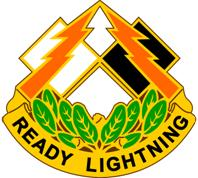
- 335th Signal Command DUI

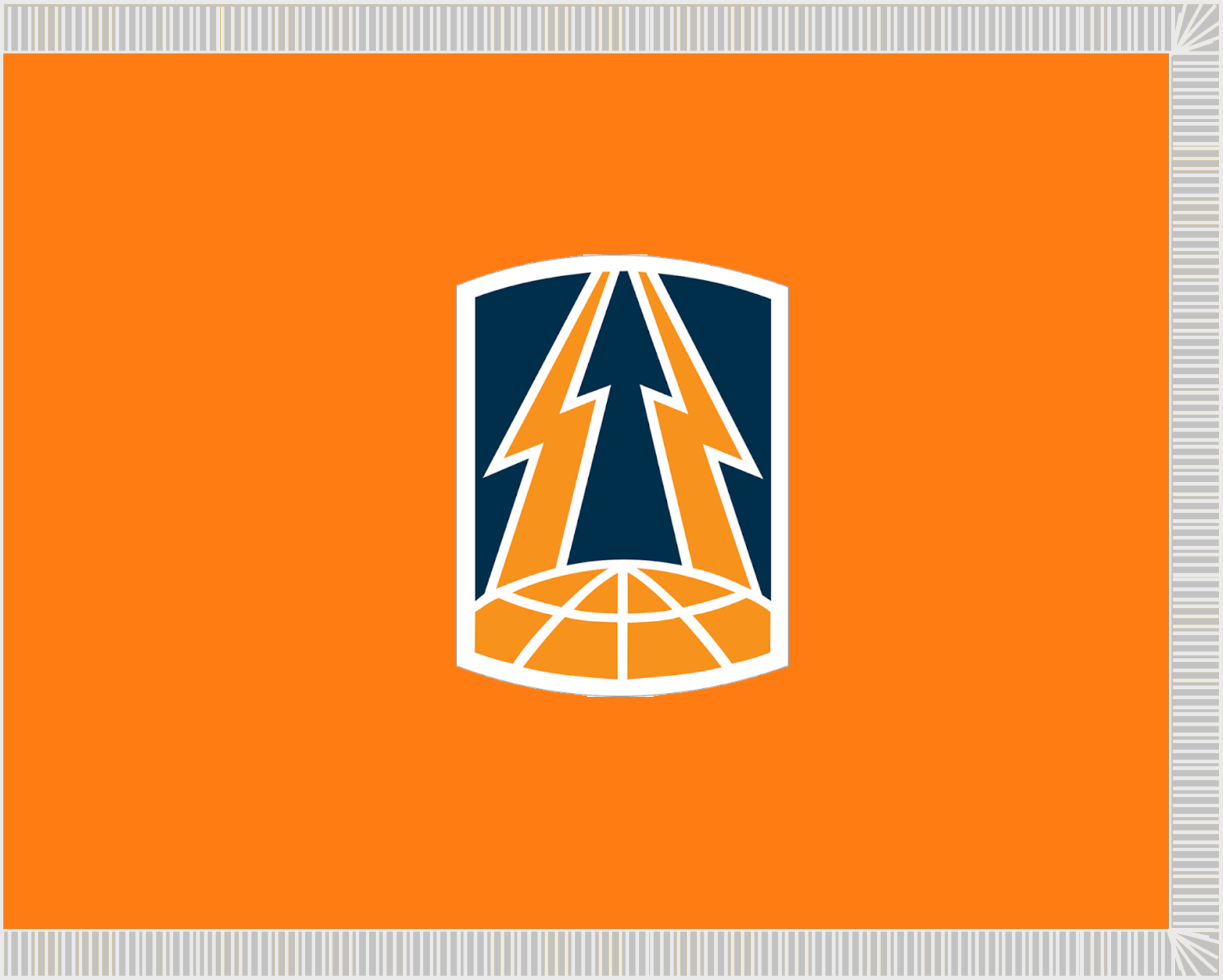
- 335th Signal Command Flag

The 335th Signal Command (Theater) (335TSC) is a command of the United States Army Reserve. It has more than 4,000 Active and Reserve Soldiers, providing Signal and Cyber units in direct support of the U.S. Army, Army Reserve exercises, and Homeland Defense missions throughout the United States.

Embracing the motto, "Ready Lightning," The 335th Signal Command (Theater) is one of the Army's four theater signal commands.

The 335th Signal Command (Theater) has Army Reserve Signal Soldiers assigned to units throughout United States and overseas supporting ongoing military operations.

In 2016, the 335th Signal Command (Theater) became the Army Reserve proponent for Defensive Cyber Operations/Forces for the Army Reserve as the Army Reserve Cyber Operations Group (ARCOG) transitioned from the 76th Operational Readiness Command (ORC) to the 335th Signal Command (Theater). This transition brings Army Reserve Cyber Protection Teams to the 335th Signal Command (Theater).

== Current leadership ==
- Commanding General: Major General Jan C. Norris
- Command Sergeant Major: Command Sergeant Major William T. Padgelek Jr.
- Command Chief Warrant Officer: Chief Warrant Officer Five Lawrence A. Makuakane
- Command Executive Officer: Mr. Edward Hriczov Jr.
- Deputy Commanding General (Signal): Brigadier General Kimberly Hamilton
- Deputy Commanding General (Cyber): Brigadier General Dane M. Sandersen
- Chief of Staff: Colonel Matthew Lawson

Updated 17JUN24 by SGT Tarako Braswell, 335th SC (T) Command Public Affairs Office NCO.

== Organization ==
The 335th Signal Command (Theater) is a subordinate functional command of the United States Army Reserve Command. As of January 2026, the command consists of the following units:

- 335th Signal Command (Theater), in East Point (GA)
  - Headquarters and Headquarters Company, in East Point (GA)
  - 335th Signal Command (Theater) Mission Support Element, in East Point (GA)
  - Defense Information Systems Agency — Army Reserve Element (DISA-ARE), at Letterkenny Army Depot (PA)
    - Detachment 1, Defense Information Systems Agency — Army Reserve Element, at Fort Meade (MD)
    - Detachment 2, Defense Information Systems Agency — Army Reserve Element, at Redstone Arsenal (AL)
    - Detachment 3, Defense Information Systems Agency — Army Reserve Element, at Fort Carson (CO)
    - Detachment 4, Defense Information Systems Agency — Army Reserve Element, in St. Louis (MO)
  - Joint Enabling Capabilities Command — Army Reserve Element (JECC-ARE), in Norfolk (VA)
    - Detachment 3, Joint Communications Support Element, at MacDill Air Force Base (FL)
  - Signal Command (Theater) Support Unit, at Redstone Arsenal (AL)
  - Signal Command (Theater) Support Unit (CENTCOM), in East Point (GA)
  - Signal Command (Theater) Support Unit (PACIFIC), in Tustin (CA)
  - 359th Signal Brigade (Theater Tactical), at Fort Gordon (GA)
    - Headquarters and Headquarters Company, at Fort Gordon (GA)
    - 324th Expeditionary Signal Battalion, at Fort Gordon (GA)
    - 392nd Expeditionary Signal Battalion - Enhanced, in Baltimore (MD)
    - 982nd Signal Company (Combat Camera), in East Point (GA)
  - 505th Signal Brigade (Theater Tactical), in Las Vegas (NV)
    - Headquarters and Headquarters Company, in Las Vegas (NV)
    - 98th Expeditionary Signal Battalion, in Mesa (AZ)
    - 319th Expeditionary Signal Battalion, in Sacramento (CA)
  - Cyber Protection Brigade, in Adelphi (MD)
    - Northeast Cyber Protection Center, at Fort Devens (MA)
      - Headquarters and Headquarters Company, at Fort Devens (MA)
      - Cyber Protection Team 180, at Fort Devens (MA)
      - Cyber Protection Team 181, at Joint Base McGuire-Dix-Lakehurst (NJ)
    - National Capital Region Cyber Protection Center, in Adelphi (MD)
      - Headquarters and Headquarters Company, in Adelphi (MD)
      - Cyber Protection Team 182, in Adelphi (MD)
      - Cyber Protection Team 183, in Adelphi (MD)
    - Southwest Cyber Protection Center, at Joint Base San Antonio (TX)
      - Headquarters and Headquarters Company, at Joint Base San Antonio (TX)
      - Cyber Protection Team 184, at Joint Base San Antonio (TX)
      - Cyber Protection Team 185, in Phoenix (AZ)
    - North Central Cyber Protection Center, in Coraopolis (PA)
      - Headquarters and Headquarters Company, in Coraopolis (PA)
      - Cyber Protection Team 186, in Coraopolis (PA)
      - Cyber Protection Team 187, at Fort Sheridan (IL)
        - Detachment 1, Cyber Protection Team 187, at Fort Snelling (MN)
    - Western Cyber Protection Center, at Camp Parks (CA)
      - Headquarters and Headquarters Company, at Camp Parks (CA)
      - Cyber Protection Team 188, at Camp Murray (WA)
      - Cyber Protection Team 189, at Fort Carson (CO)
        - Detachment 1, Cyber Protection Team 189, in Garden Grove (CA)

== Campaign participation credit ==
- Republic of Vietnam
- Operation Desert Shield
- Operation Desert Storm
- Operation Enduring Freedom
- Operation Iraqi Freedom
- Operation Atlantic Resolve
- Operation Inherent Resolve

== Provisional Command ==
Shortly after the September 11 attacks, the 335th Signal Command mobilized reserve soldiers and active Army personnel to Camp Doha, Kuwait. The unit moved to Camp Arifjan, Kuwait in 2005, where it remains today as an enduring presence in the USCENTCOM/USARCENT AOR. Currently, the 335th Signal Command (Theater) (Provisional) provides signal support to USARCENT for Resolute Support Mission (RSM), Operation Inherent Resolve (CJTF-OIR).

== Shoulder sleeve insignia ==
Shoulder Sleeve Insignia. Description: A dark blue vertical rectangle arched at top and bottom with a 1/8 inch (0.32 cm) white border, 2 1/4 inches (5.7 cm) in width and 3 inches (7.6 cm) in height overall having in base the polar section of an orange globe with white grid lines and issuant therefrom two white-edged orange flashes with points converging at top center. Symbolism: Orange and white are the colors associated with the Signal Corps. Dark blue signifies the atmosphere and the flashes and globe are symbolic of the unit's worldwide communication capability. The shoulder sleeve insignia was approved on 30 October 1985 designed by Major Charles K Reber 20 February 1985.

== Distinctive unit insignia ==
Description: A gold color metal and enamel device 1 1/8 inches (2.9 cm) in height overall consisting of two quadrates conjoined with point up, the left quadrant of white, the right of black, surmounted by two orange lightning flashes chevronwise and extending above and below the quadrates; in base, a green open wreath of Live Oak, all above a semicircular gold scroll folded back at the base of each flash and inscribed, "READY LIGHTNING" in black letters, areas between quadrates and flashes at top and quadrates and Live Oak in base are pierced. Symbolism: The white and black quadrates and the lightning flashes symbolize the organization's day and night mission to direct and coordinate the operations, training, administration and logistics support of assigned and attached units. The Live Oak, the State Tree of Georgia and a symbol of ever-ready strength in reserve, also alludes to the organization's origin and home station at Atlanta, Georgia. Orange and white are colors used for the Signal Corps. The distinctive unit insignia was originally approved on 10 December 1971 for the 335th Signal Group. It was redesignated for the 335th Signal Brigade on 24 December 1984. The insignia was redesignated for the 335th Signal Command on 16 April 1986.

== Past Commanders ==
Order	Position	Incumbent	Start of Service	End of Service	Notable Service
1st	Group Commander	COL James F. Callahan	Feb 1953	Mar 1956	
2nd	Group Commander	COL Hodge W. Norman	Mar 1956	Oct 1961	
3rd	Group Commander	COL Daniel J. Scarborough	Oct 1961	Dec 1963	Vietnam War
4th	Group Commander	COL Marvin M. Kilgro	Dec 1963	Jul 1965	Vietnam War
	N/A	N/A	Jul 1965	Oct 1971	Missing Information
5th	Group Commander	COL Marion A. Woodward	Oct 1971	Feb 1972	Vietnam War
	N/A	N/A	Feb 1972	Apr 1973	Missing Information
6th	Group Commander	COL Carlyle W. Woodruff	Apr 1973	May 1974	Vietnam War
7th	Group Commander	COL Joseph E. Turner	Jul 1977	Jun 1981	
8th	Group Commander	COL Emory S. Mabry III	Jun 1981	May 1984	
9th	Brigade Commander	COL Tommy Bonds	May 1984	Oct 1987	
10th	Commanding General	MG John R. McWaters	Oct 1987	Oct 1991	
11th	Commanding General	MG Joseph E. Turner	Oct 1991	Jul 1995	
12th	Commanding General	MG Tommy W. Bonds Sr.	Jul 1995	Nov 1997	
13th	Commanding General	MG Thomas A. Wessels	Nov 1997	Nov 2001	Operation Joint Guardian (KFOR), Operation Joint Forge (SFOR)
14th	Commanding General	MG Lowell "Rip" C. Detamore	Nov 2001	Nov 2005	Operation Enduring Freedom (OEF), Operation Iraqi Freedom (OIF)
15th	Commanding General	MG Dennis E. Lutz	Nov 2005	Sep 2009	Operation Enduring Freedom (OEF), Operation Iraqi Freedom (OIF)
16th	Commanding General	MG Stuart M. Dyer	Sep 2009	Sep 2012	Operation Enduring Freedom (OEF), Operation Iraqi Freedom (OIF)
17th	Commanding General	MG Lawrence W. Brock III	Sep 2012	May 2014	Operation Enduring Freedom (OEF), Operation Iraqi Freedom (OIF)
18th	Commanding General	BG Christopher R. Kemp	May 2014	Oct 2016	Operation Spartan Shield (OSS), Operation Inherent Resolve (OIR), Operation Enduring Freedom (OFS), Operation Freedom's Sentinel (OFS)
19th	Commanding General	MG Peter A. Bosse	Oct 2016	Feb 2020	Operation Spartan Shield (OSS), Operation Inherent Resolve (OIR), Operation Freedom's Sentinel (OFS)
20th	Commanding General	MG John H. Phillips	Feb 2020	Aug 2022	Operation Spartan Shield (OSS), Operation Inherent Resolve (OIR), Operation Freedom's Sentinel (OFS), Operation Atlantic Resolve (OAR)
21st	Commanding General	MG Tina B. Boyd	Aug 2022	June 2024	
