= 362nd Signal Company =

- 1st Signal Brigade Shoulder Sleeve Insignia
- Active: 10 August 1944 – present
- Country: United States of America
- Allegiance: United States Army
- Type: Signals
- Size: company
- Part of: 1st Signal Brigade
- Garrison/HQ: Seoul Air Base, South Korea
- Nickname: Dreadnaught

The 362nd Signal Company ("Deuces Wild") is a military communications company of the United States Army subordinate to the 41st Signal Battalion, 1st Signal Brigade and located at Seoul Air Base in South Korea.

== Vietnam War ==
The 362nd Signal Company was deployed in Vietnam from 23 March 1962, to 15 March 1973, as part of the 39th Signal Battalion. The 362nd was deployed from the Delta to the DMZ, providing long range Tropo-Scatter radio telephone communications throughout South Vietnam, with one site in Udorn Air Force Base in Thailand. In early 1964, the site in Ubon was no longer part of the 362nd Signal. By mid 1964, the 362nd operated Microwave Communications sites in Soc Trang, Vinh Long, Phulam (near Saigon), Nha Trang, Quinhon, Danang, Hue, Quang Ngai, Pleiku, Ban Me Thuot and Gia Nghia. In July, 1964, the 362n Signal Company had 216 Enlisted Men and 12 Officers. Operation Back Porch was the use of AN/MRC-85 Troposphere Scatter Microwave Communications Systems linking Saigon, Nha Trang, Quinhon and Danang, and linking Nha Trang to Pleiku and Ubon. The 362nd Signal also operated TRC-90 Microwave links joining Soc Trang to Vinh Long and Phulan, linking Phu Lam with Gia Nghia, Ban Me Thuot and Pleiku, linking Danang with Hue, Chu Lai and Quang Ngai. The 362nd Signal was just about the first in and the last out of regular US Army company sized units deployed to South Vietnam. The final mission was turning over the communications sites to the International Control Commission following the signing of the Paris Peace Agreement. The motto during that period was "Hang Loose With the Deuce." During my period of service in Vietnam with the 362nd Signal Company, June 1967 to June 1968, we were under the 73rd Signal Battalion.

== South Korea to the modern day ==
On 1 July 1974 the company was activated in the Republic of Korea under the 1st Signal Brigade. The company's mission in South Korea is to Install, Operate, Maintain, Protect and Restore Joint and Combined Theater Strategic Command and Control Communications Systems in Support of United Nations Command (UNC), Combined Forces Command (CFC), United States Forces Command-Korea (USFK), Eighth United States Army, and their subordinate commands, in order to defend the Republic of Korea, to deter enemy aggression and, if necessary, to defeat enemy forces in the event of war.

== Lineage ==
- Constituted 10 August 1944 in the Army of the United States as the 3263d Signal Service Company
- Activated 9 November 1944 in England
- Inactivated 19 November 1945 at Camp Patrick Henry, Virginia
- Redesignated 28 December 1950 as the 362d Signal Operations Company and allotted to the Organized Reserve Corps
- Activated 1 January 1951 at Savannah, Georgia
- Reorganized and redesignated 1 May 1952 as the 362d Signal Support Company
- (Organized Reserve Corps redesignated 9 July 1952 as the Army Reserve)
- Inactivated 30 April 1954 at Savannah, Georgia
- Redesignated 3 December 1954 as the 362d Signal Company; concurrently withdrawn from the Army Reserve and allotted to the Regular Army
- Activated 28 January 1955 at Camp Gordon, Georgia
- Deployed to Vietnam March 1962
- Inactivated 28 June 1972 in Vietnam for Operation Back Porch
- Activated 1 July 1974 in Korea

== Campaign participation credit ==
World War II

- Central Europe

Vietnam

- Advisory
- Defense
- Counteroffensive
- Counteroffensive, Phase II
- Counteroffensive, Phase III
- Tet Counteroffensive
- Counteroffensive, Phase IV
- Counteroffensive, Phase V
- Counteroffensive, Phase VI
- Tet 69/Counteroffensive
- Summer-Fall 1969
- Winter-Spring 1970
- Sanctuary Counteroffensive
- Counteroffensive, Phase VII
- Consolidation I
- Consolidation II
- Cease-Fire

== Unit Decorations ==
Award streamer	Award	Dates	Notes
	Meritorious Unit Commendation	1962-1965	Vietnam
	Meritorious Unit Commendation	1966-1968	Vietnam, Detachment 10 & 10A Meritorious Unit Commendation—1 Jun 68–31 Mar 70, DAGO 24, 72
	Superior Unit Award	2007	

- Meritorious Unit Commendation (Army), VIETNAM 1966-1968
- Detachment 10 & 10A Meritorious Unit Commendation—1 Jun 68–31 Mar 70, DAGO 24, 72
- Army Superior Unit Award, Jan 2007-Dec 2007

== Notable commanders ==
- Lieutenant General Steven W. Boutelle, former U.S. Army Chief Information Officer / G-6
