= 362nd =

362nd or 362d may refer to:

- 362d Bombardment Squadron or 964th Airborne Air Control Squadron Constituted as the 362d Bombardment Squadron (Heavy) on 28 January 1942
- 362d Fighter Group or 128th Air Refueling Wing, unit of the Wisconsin Air National Guard, stationed at General Mitchell Air National Guard Base, Milwaukee, Wisconsin
- 362d Fighter Squadron, unit of the Ohio Air National Guard 178th Intelligence Surveillance and Reconnaissance Wing located at Springfield Air National Guard Base, Ohio
- 362d Tactical Electronic Warfare Squadron, inactive United States Air Force unit
- 362nd Signal Company ("Deuces Wild"), military communications company of the United States Army subordinate to the 41st Signal Battalion, located at Seoul Air Base in South Korea

== See also ==
- 362 (number)
- 362, the year 362 (CCCLXII) of the Julian calendar
- 362 BC
