= Alan R. Lynn =

United States Army general

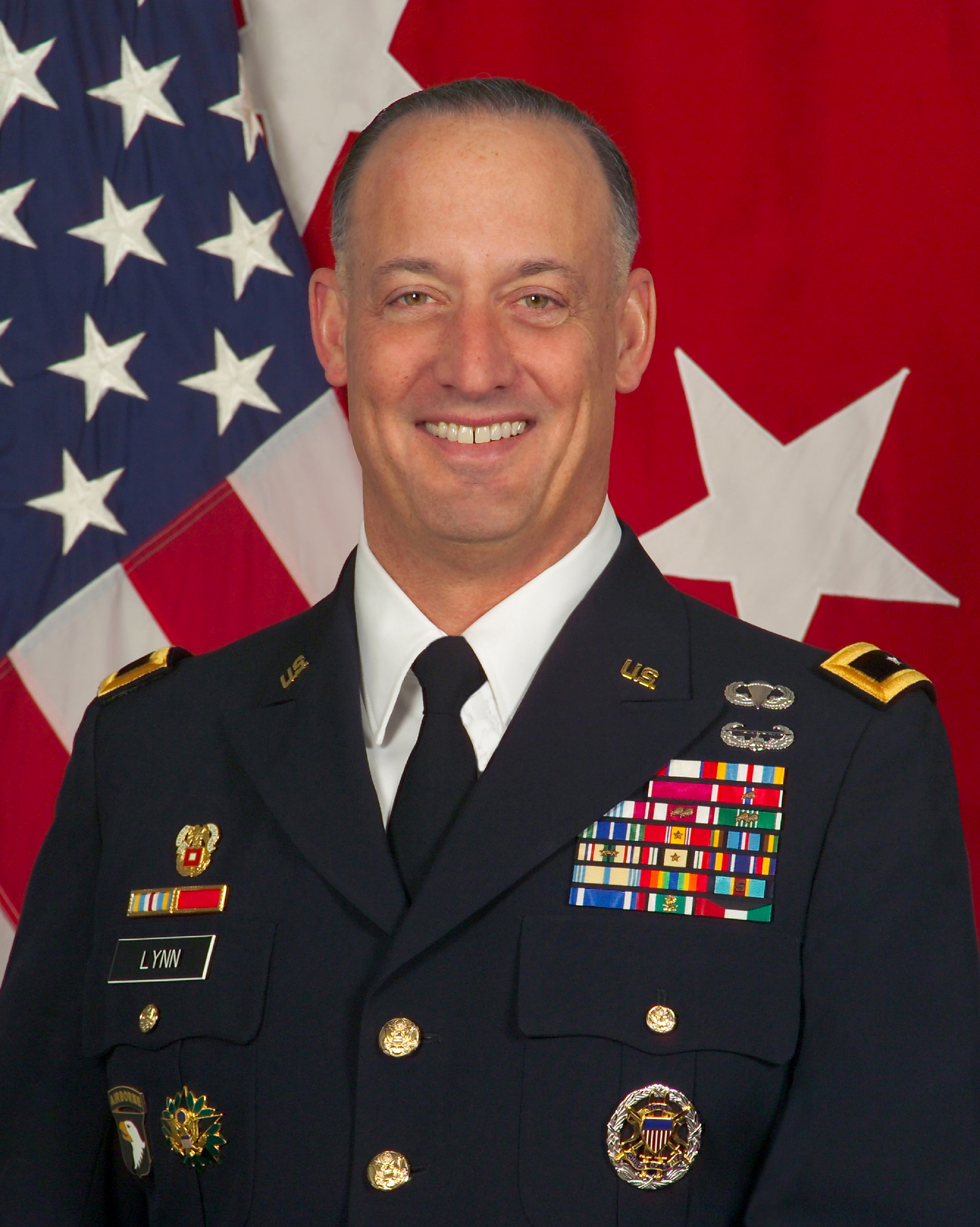
- LTG Alan R. Lynn, USA; Director, Defense Information Systems Agency,
- Military career
- Allegiance: United States of America
- Branch: United States Army
- Service years: 1979–2018
- Rank: Lieutenant General
- Commands: Defense Information Systems Agency; U.S. Army Signal Center of Excellence; Commanding General, Fort Gordon; 35th Chief of Signal Signal Corps (United States Army), 311th Signal Command (Theater), 3d Signal Brigade, 13th Signal Battalion

U.S. Army Lieutenant General Alan R. Lynn was the Director, Defense Information Systems Agency at Fort Meade, MD.

== Education ==
Lieutenant General Lynn graduated from the California University of Pennsylvania, California, PA, earning a bachelor's degree in English. He also holds a master's degree in National Resource Management from the Industrial College of the Armed Forces (ICAF). Cyber Security, Senior Executives in Government, John F. Kennedy School of Government, Harvard University. His other military education includes the Air Defense Artillery Basic and Advanced Courses, the Signal Officer Advanced Course, the United States Air Force Information Systems Officer's Course where he became a Network Engineer, the Command and General Staff College and the Defense Language Institute for Italian.

== Military career ==
Lieutenant General Lynn commissioned into the United States Army as an Air Defense Artillery Officer. His first assignment was with the 1-51st Air Defense Artillery Battalion, 7th Infantry Division, Ft. Ord, CA, where he served as a Chaparral and Stinger Platoon Leader, Air Defense Fire Support Officer, and C Company Executive Officer. Following the Air Defense Artillery Advance Course, he attended the Defense Language Institute to learn Italian. In 1984, he commanded the 1-34th United States Army Artillery Detachment, a Nike Hercules missile special weapons warhead team, in Ceggia, Italy.

Lieutenant General Lynn branch transferred to the Signal Corps, and served as the Training Officer for the 5th Signal Command in Worms, Germany. In 1986, he took command of the 324th Signal Company, 72d Signal Battalion, Karlsruhe, Germany, in support of the US Army Europe (USAREUR) Main Command Post.

Following his second company level command, Lieutenant General Lynn attended the Signal Officer Advance Course at Ft. Gordon, GA, and the Air Force Information Systems Officer's Course at Keesler Air Force Base, MS where he was awarded a new Military Occupational Specialty (MOS) of 25E, Network Engineer. He was then assigned as the Division Radio Officer for the 101st Airborne Division. In 1990, he served as the Brigade Signal Officer for the 1st Infantry Brigade, 101st Airborne Division, during operations Desert Shield and Desert Storm.

In June 1992, he graduated from the Command and General Staff College at Fort Leavenworth, KS, and returned to Europe where he served as the S-3 (Network Design, Management, and Operations) for the 97th Signal Battalion in Mannheim, Germany. Following his time as the Battalion S3, he was selected to command the newly formed 414th Signal Company as a Field Grade Officer, supporting Land Forces Central Europe (LANDCENT).

From June 1994 to April 1997, Lieutenant General Lynn served as the Signal Branch Lieutenant Colonel's Assignment Officer and the Lieutenant Colonel Command Program Manager in PERSCOM (now Human Resources Command). While serving at PERSCOM, he helped digitize the command's manual slating process.

In 1997, Lieutenant General Lynn assumed command of the 13th Signal Battalion, 1st Cavalry Division, at Fort Hood, TX. He deployed the battalion for Operation JOINT FORGE between 1998 and 1999. While deployed, the battalion supported Task Force Eagle, Multi-Nation Division (North), in Tuzla, Bosnia-Herzegovina. In 2000, he was assigned as an Action Officer in the Network Management Division of the Joint Chiefs of Staff, J6, at the Pentagon. Following the September 11th attack on the Pentagon, he was selected as the Division Chief for the Commander-in-Chief (CINC) Operations and Support Division of the J6.

Lieutenant General Lynn took command of the 3d Signal Brigade, Fort Hood, TX, in 2002. In January 2004, he deployed the brigade to 66 locations across Iraq, creating the world's largest combat communications network at the time.

In 2005, Lieutenant General Lynn was assigned to the Department of the Army Chief Information Officer/G6 Office as the Division Chief for LandWarNet Integration Division. He was later selected to serve as the Executive Officer to the Army CIO/G6.

In 2007, Lieutenant General Lynn became the Chief of Staff for the Defense Information Systems Agency, Arlington, VA. DISA provides command, control, and combat support systems for the President, Secretary of Defense, Combatant Commanders, Joint Staff, military departments, and combat support agencies. As the Chief of Staff, Lieutenant General Lynn was responsible for coordinating the efforts of a 6,600-member organization and managing a $6-billion yearly budget.

In 2008, Lieutenant General Lynn took command of the 311th Signal Command (Theater), Fort Shafter, Hawaii.

In 2010, Lieutenant General Lynn was selected to command the U.S. Army Signal Center of Excellence (SIGCoE) (The Army's IT University) and Fort Gordon, Georgia and assumed responsibility as the Army's 35th Chief of Signal

Lieutenant General Lynn was in command of Army Network Enterprise Technology Command (NETCOM) at Fort Huachuca, AZ on August 9, 2012.

Lieutenant General Lynn took upon the responsibilities of Vice Director, Defense Information Systems Agency on September 30, 2013.

On July 23, 2015, LTG Lynn became Director of Defense Information Systems Agency following the retirement of the Agency's current director, Air Force Lt Gen Ronnie D. Hawkins.

== Contributions ==
CPT(P) - Infantry Brigade SIGO - Designed all Single Channel Networks for the 101st Airborne Division, Air Assault, into Iraq for Desert Storm under the command of Colonel Tom Hill, later General Hill. It was the largest Air Assault in the U.S. Army's History.

MAJ - Developed the NATO interface manual to connect all NATO switchboards to US switchboards (NATO 5040 interfaces) with WO1 Mark Morrel, who now works at the Fort Gordon Battle Lab.

LTC - Human Resources Command (HRC/PERSCOM) - Developed the automated Brigade and Battalion CDPL the Officer Selection Support System (OSSS) Program Management System used to slate Battalion and Brigade commanders. One by product was the "photo ORB." Both are still in use today. Also served as a White House Social Aide for President Clinton.

LTC - Battalion Command - Created the first NATO and non-NATO network (now called CENTRIX) in Bosnia with MG Kevin Byrnes, 1st Cavalry Division. Tested the first use of Voice over IP in combat with the help of CISCO and WO1 Ed Johnson. Conducted the first VTC wedding (with proxies at both ends) with WO1 Rick Pena. Worked with Brian Lass and General Dynamics to create the first high speed multiplex (MUX) cards for MSE (provided a high speed network), set up a "Skype-like" capability for Soldiers to talk to Families from Bosnia before there was Skype. Much credit to MAJ John Morrison, now COL(P) Morrison for his help and leadership

LTC - Joint Staff J6 Current Ops (9/11) - Mapped out all communications in the Pentagon while it was burning, where one did not exist during the 9/11 attack, directing fire fighters away from the communications closets, thereby keeping the Pentagon operational during and after 9/11.

COL - Set up a digital Family Readiness Group at Fort Hood that was considered by GEN Ellis, FORSCOM Commander as the "Gold Standard". The large use of the facility required a full-time staff member which became the first Family Readiness Support Assistant (FRSA), which is now proliferated throughout the Army.

Directed the III Corps G6 and the CTSF Staff to develop the Combined Information Data Network Exchange (CIDNE) which was developed to be the primary bridge between disparate communities to share data. Still used in CENTCOM as a primary SIGACT and Counter-IED tool. Recognized by Congress for creating the largest tactical communication network in history during OIF 2.

BG - Created a paperless work environment in DISA, 311th Signal Command, and the United States Army Signal Center of Excellence and Fort Gordon.

MG - Worked to redesign the doctrine and education for Officers, Warrant Officers, NCO's and Soldiers. Redesigned all enlisted signal MOS's, redesigned the future equipment being used by the Army that was coined microcyber or "μcyber", and refocused the acquisition process to streamline system upgrades. Graduated the first class of Signal Cyber Professionals (MOS 255S, Cyber Warrant Officer).

LTG - As the leader of DISA reengineered the entire White House and Complex (18 Acres) infrastructure and instituted Multi-Factor Identification, enhanced media, and created the first secure Wi-Fi capabilities in the White House. This was the largest IT renovation in over 50 years and accomplished during President Obama and President Trump's administration. Built a new Joint Service Provider (JSP) for the Pentagon consolidating 41 disparate individual IT service providers. Created the First Commercial-based classified cell phones, tablets and service for top DOD and Government leaders. Created a way to share government spectrum to enable the Citizen Broadband Radio Service. Created a highly scalable secure global video conferencing capability for DOD. Created the DOD's first internal (on-premises) secure Cloud. As the leader/Commander of Joint Forces Headquarters Department of Defense Information Network (DODIN), under the Director of NSA/CYBERCOMMAND. envisioned and built multiple global security “stacks” to detect attacks in real-time. Created and trained the first DOD Global Cyber Protection Work Force with new in-house developed operational software to track protection team actions in contact with global Cyber attackers.

== Promotions ==
- 2LT - 7 Jun 79
- 1LT - 21 Feb 81
- CPT - 1 Jun 83
- MAJ - 1 Jun 91
- LTC - 1 Feb 96
- COL - 1 Dec 01
- BG - 2 May 08
- MG - 2 Feb 11
- LTG - 23 Jul 15

== Awards, decorations and badges ==
Defense Distinguished Service Medal
Distinguished Service Medal (with Oak Leaf Cluster)
Defense Superior Service Medal
Legion of Merit
Bronze Star (with Oak Leaf Cluster)
Defense Meritorious Service Medal
Meritorious Service Medal (with two Oak Leaf Clusters)
Joint Service Commendation Medal
Army Commendation Medal (with two Oak Leaf Clusters)
Army Achievement Medal
National Defense Service Medal (with two bronze Service Stars)
Armed Forces Expeditionary Medal
Southwest Asia Service Medal (with two bronze Service Stars)
Global War on Terrorism Expeditionary Medal
Global War on Terrorism Service Medal
Armed Forces Reserve Medal
Army Service Ribbon
Army Overseas Service Ribbon (with award numeral "5")
NATO Medal
Kuwait Liberation Medal (Saudi Arabia)
Kuwait Liberation Medal (Kuwait)

Basic Parachutist Badge
Air Assault Badge
Office of the Joint Chiefs of Staff Identification Badge
Army Staff Identification Badge

Military offices
Preceded by MG Jennifer L. Napper	Commanding General, Army Network Enterprise Technology Command; 9 August 2012 - Present	Succeeded by Incumbent
