= 1st Signal Brigade (United States) =

- 1st Signal Brigade unit insignia
- Active: 1966–present
- Country: United States
- Allegiance: 311th Signal Command
- Branch: United States Army
- Type: Signals brigade
- Size: Brigade
- Part of: Eighth United States Army
- Garrison/HQ: Camp Humphreys, South Korea
- Motto: "First to Communicate"
- Engagements: Vietnam War

Commanders
- Commander: COL Byron J. Brown
- Command Sergeant Major: CSM Calvin James

Insignia
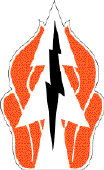
- Distinctive unit insignia

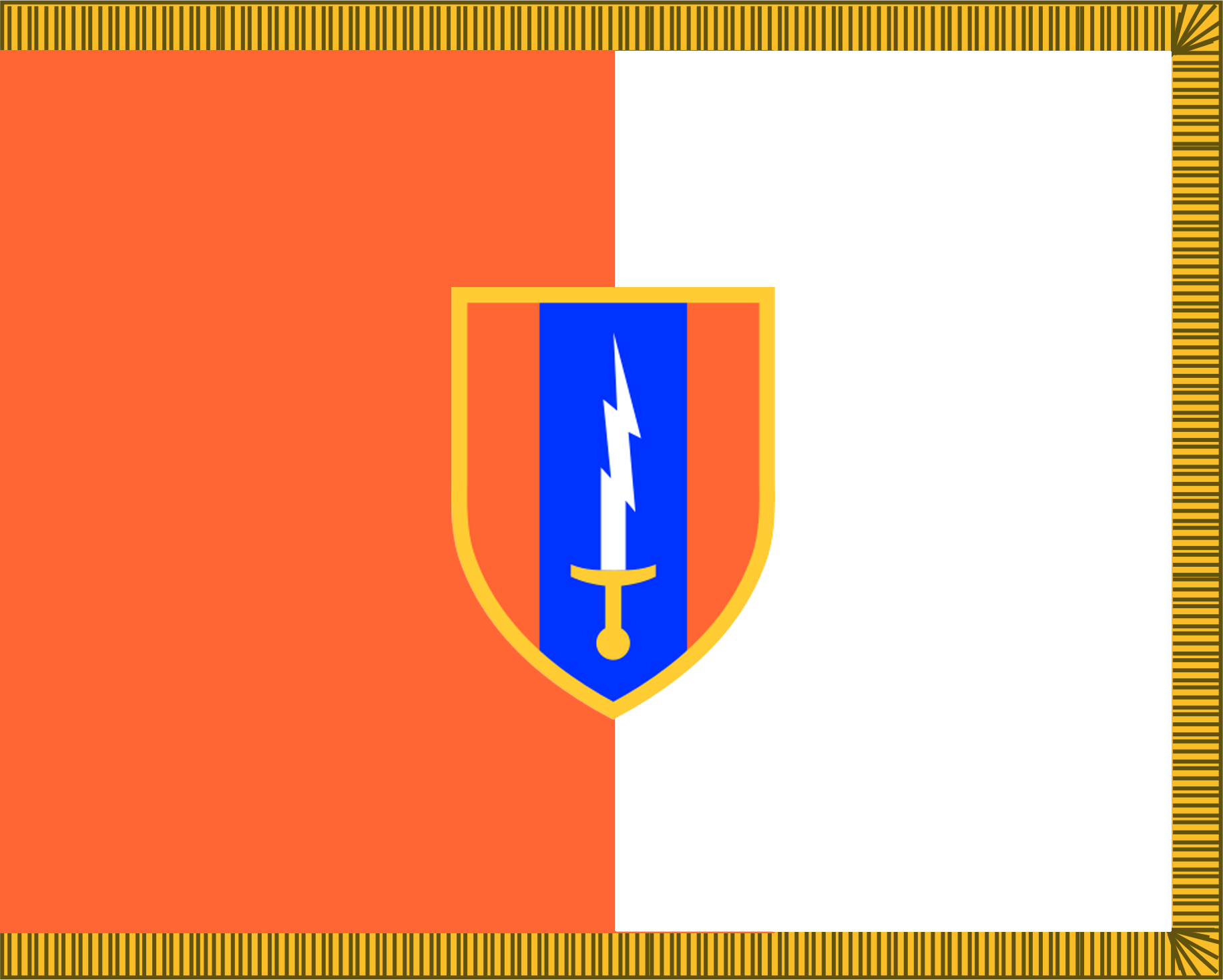
- 1st Signal Brigade Flag

The 1st Signal Brigade ("First to Communicate") is a military communications brigade of the United States Army operationally controlled to the Eighth United States Army and administratively controlled to the 311th Signal Command in Fort Shafter, Hawaii, and located at Camp Humphreys in South Korea.

== History ==
=== Vietnam War ===
The 1st Signal Brigade was activated on 1 April 1966 in South Vietnam. The brigade's mission was to originate, install, operate, and maintain a complex communication system that fused tactical and strategic communications in Southeast Asia under a single, unified command. The formation of the brigade brought together three signal groups that were already in South Vietnam.

At the peak of the Vietnam War the brigade consisted of more than 23,000 soldiers, in six Signal groups (including the 160th Signal Group), 22 signal battalions and several communications agencies, making the 1st Signal Brigade the largest signal unit in the U.S. Army at the time.

=== South Korea to present ===
On 7 November 1972 the brigade was relocated to the Republic of Korea under the United States Army Strategic Communications Command. On 29 January 1973 the 1st Signal Brigade was reestablished by General Order 56 from HQ, USASTRATCOM. The brigade's mission in South Korea is to provide communications support to the Eighth United States Army, United States Forces Korea and the United Nations Command. The brigade was also given the mission of installing, maintaining and operating the Defense Communications System in South Korea.

== Organization ==
- 1st Signal Brigade, at Camp Humphreys
  - Headquarters and Headquarters Company
  - 41st Signal Battalion, at Camp Humphreys
    - Headquarters and Headquarters Detachment
    - USANEC-Casey, at Camp Casey
    - USANEC-Humphreys, at Camp Humphreys
    - USANEC-Seoul Air Base, K-16
    - USANEC-Walker, at Camp Walker
    - USASA-Carroll, at Camp Carroll
  - 304th Expeditionary Signal Battalion - Enhanced (304th ESB-E), at Camp Humphreys
    - Headquarters and Headquarters Company
    - A Company
    - B Company
    - C Company
  - U.S. Army Communications Information Systems Activity, Pacific, at Camp Humphreys

== Lineage ==
- Constituted 26 March 1966 in the Regular Army as Headquarters and Headquarters Company, 1st Signal Brigade
- Activated 1 April 1966 in Vietnam

== Campaign participation credit ==
Vietnam

- Counteroffensive
- Counteroffensive, Phase II
- Counteroffensive, Phase III
- Tet Counteroffensive
- Counteroffensive, Phase IV
- Counteroffensive, Phase V
- Counteroffensive, Phase VI
- Tet 69/Counteroffensive
- Summer-Fall 1969
- Winter-Spring 1970
- Sanctuary Counteroffensive
- Counteroffensive, Phase VII
- Consolidation I
- Consolidation II
- Cease-Fire

== Decorations ==
- Meritorious Unit Commendation (Army), Streamer embroidered VIETNAM 1966-1967
- Meritorious Unit Commendation (Army), Streamer embroidered VIETNAM 1967-1969
- Meritorious Unit Commendation (Army), Streamer embroidered VIETNAM 1970-1972
- Army Superior Unit Award, Streamer embroidered 2007
