= 25th Signal Battalion (United States) =

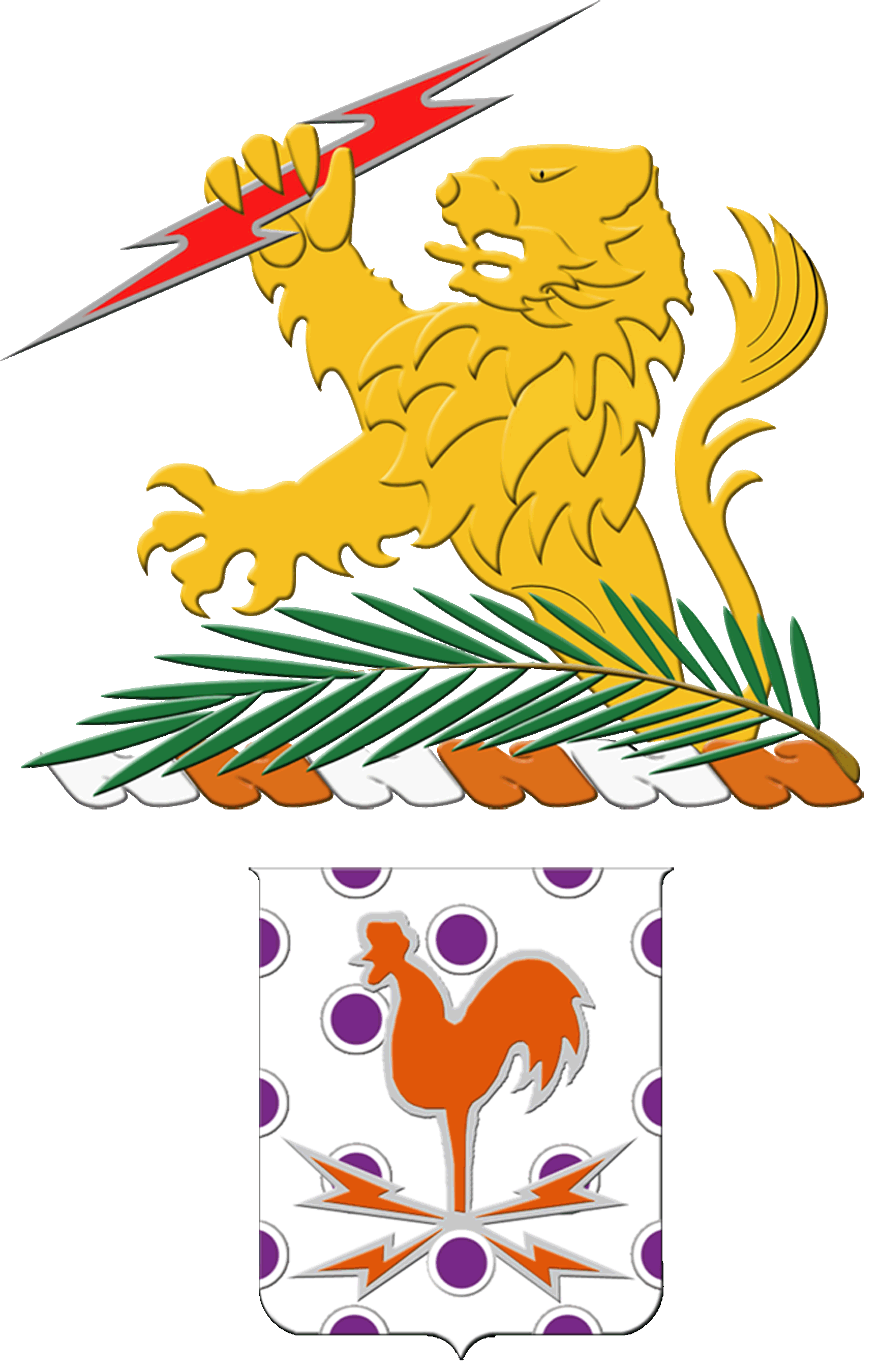
- 25th Signal Battalion coat of arms
- Active: 1944-1946; 1951-1968; 1971-1993; 16 October 2003-Present
- Country: United States
- Branch: Regular Army
- Type: Communications
- Role: Strategic communications support
- Garrison/HQ: Al Udeid Air Base, Qatar
- Motto: Never Unprepared - Always Ready
- Colors: Orange and White
- Engagements: World War II; Cold War; Asiatic Pacific; Desert Shield; Desert Storm; Operation Enduring Freedom; Operation Freedom's Sentinel; Operation Resolute Support

Commanders
- Commander: LTC Nathaniel Tucker Jr; 18 June 2025 - Pres.
- Command Sergeant Major: CSM Keith R. Russell Jr; 18 July 2025 - Pres.

Insignia
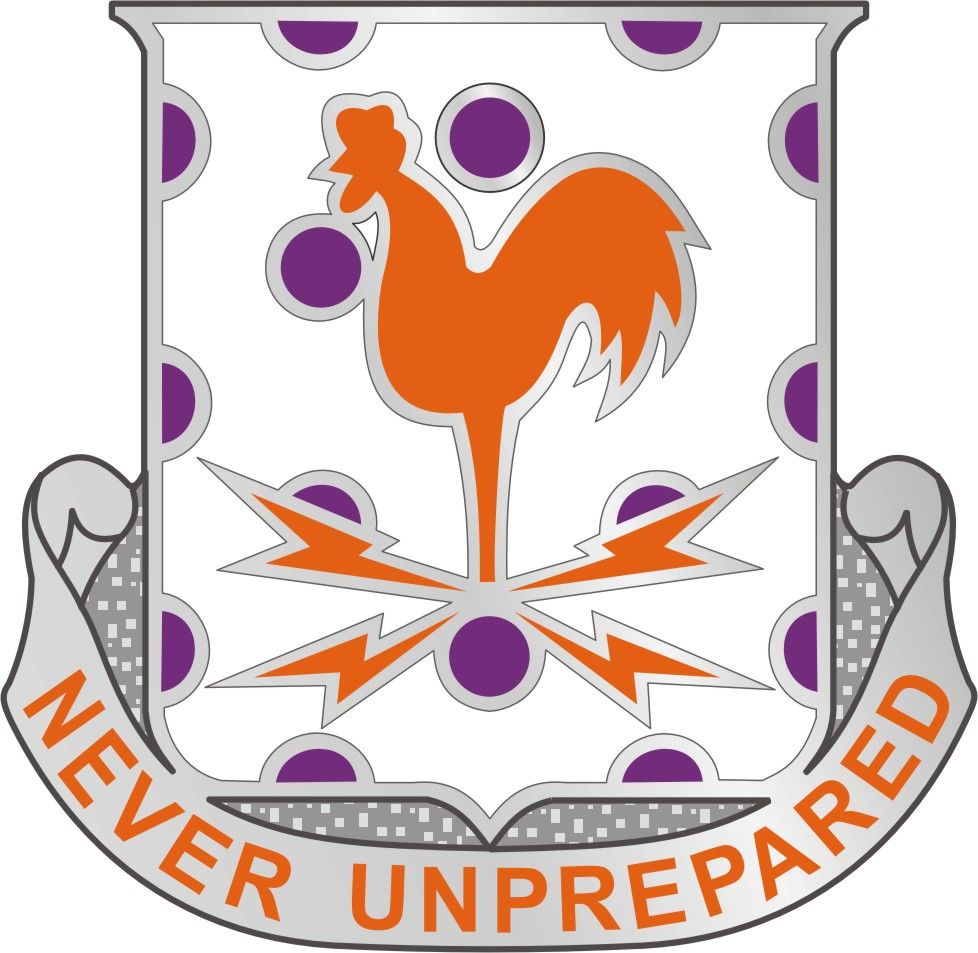
- Distinctive Unit Insignia

The 25th Signal Battalion is a strategic signal battalion (SSB) of the United States Army. The battalion is one of two permanently assigned to the 160th Signal Brigade.

== Mission ==
The 25th Strategic Signal Battalion is formally tasked to 'maintain a forward-stationed theater signal battalion to Install, Operate, Maintain, and Protect (IOM&P) theater strategic and operational C4 systems to provide reliable and responsive operational communications in support of USCENTCOM Combatant, Coalition, Allied forces, and other U.S. government agencies across the Central and Southwest Asia Theater of operations. Facilitate integration of rotational forces and signal assets into the Theater Information Grid.'

== Battalion history ==
The 25th Signal Battalion was constituted on 3 February 1944 and was activated on 14 April 1944 as a light signal construction battalion at Camp Forrest Tennessee. On 26 June of the same year, the battalion was reorganized as a heavy signal construction battalion.

During World War II, the 25th served in Europe and the Far East and is one of the few units of its type to claim this distinction. The battalion earned three battle streamers for its participation in the Campaigns of Central Europe, Rhineland, and the Asiatic-Pacific Theater. On 6 April 1946, the 25th Heavy Signal Construction Battalion was inactivated at Yokohama, Japan. The battalion was reactivated on 20 November 1951 and was designated as a signal construction battalion at Camp Edwards Massachusetts. The unit aided with the restoration of communications lines in several New England states after destruction left by Hurricane Carol in 1954.

In the spring of 1956, the battalion was transferred to Europe in support of the 7th Army and in 1957 the unit installed in excess of 2,000 miles (3,200 km) of cable through the forests of Germany. Again, in 1966 the battalion was inactivated except for Charlie Company which was attached to the 440th Signal Battalion. Later, on 1 October 1968, C/25 was redesignated as the 541st Cable Construction Company thus completing the inactivation of the 25th Signal Battalion.

On 18 January 1971, the battalion was reactivated at Fort Bragg and designated the 25th Signal Battalion (Operation). At that time, the unit was one of four signal battalions within the 35th Signal Group. The unit's mission was to install, operate, and maintain a portion of the integrated signal communications systems within the theater Army Communications Zone.

On 16 March 1984, the battalion was reorganized as the 25th Signal Battalion (Corps Area). It was assigned to the 35th Signal Brigade (Airborne) to extend area communications in support of XVIII Airborne Corps. The battalion consisted of four line companies each responsible for establishing a corps area signal center and a battalion headquarters company. The 25th was capable of worldwide tactical connections to automated message and voice switching networks (AUTODIN and AUTOVON). The battalion provided the XVIII Airborne Corps with sustainment base communications for Operation Just Cause from December 1989 to March 1990 in addition to tasking its FM RETRANS assets for use in Panama during Operation Just Cause. Less than one year later, the 25th Signal Battalion was participating in Operations Desert Shield and Desert Storm in the Middle East. The battalion deployed all of its assets to Saudi Arabia less A/25th, which remained at Fort Bragg to provide sustainment base communications. Soldiers from the 25th Signal Battalion supported the Southwest Asia Campaign from September 1990 to July 1991 installing part of the largest tactical network at that time.

From October 1991 through July 1992, the 25th Signal Battalion was responsible for supporting most of the XVIII Airborne Corps' communications missions while the other three battalions within the brigade underwent Mobile Subscriber Equipment (MSE) fielding. In March 1992, the 514th Signal Company was attached to the 25th Signal Battalion. In August 1992, the battalion was called upon to deploy to southern Florida to aid in the recovery of the area after the destruction caused by Hurricane Andrew. The battalion provided key command and control communications to units assisting in the restoration of the area. It also provided soldiers to help with cleanup efforts and other humanitarian actions.

On 16 March 1993, the battalion received a notification to inactivate with an effective date of 16 October 1993. Elements of the 25th Signal Battalion and 514th Signal Company remained after the inactivation and were reassigned to the 327th Signal Battalion under a new organizational concept supporting force protection warfare. Bravo Company of the 25th Signal Battalion was reflagged as Delta Company 327th.

On 1 September 2003, the 25th Signal Battalion reactivated in Qatar at As Saliyah, near Doha. The Brigade Commander, Colonel John M. Blaine III presented the colors to Lieutenant Colonel Leith A. Benedict to reactivate the battalion in the midst of Operation Iraqi Freedom and Operation Enduring Freedom. On 16 October 2003, the battalion was officially activated by Headquarters Department of the Army, Permanent Orders Number 180-7. The mission of the Battalion is to maintain a combat-ready, forward stationed Signal Battalion tasked to install, operate, maintain, protect strategic sustaining bases and tactical C4I systems in support of USCENTCOM combatant and non-combatant forces, coalition allies and other US government agencies. Upon activation, the battalion assumed command of the 580th and 550th Signal companies from the 54th Signal Battalion stationed at Camp Doha, Kuwait.

In 2021 the 25th Signal Battalion completed its deployment to Afghanistan as the primary source of signal support for Operation Freedom's Sentinel (OFS) and Resolute Support (RS).

== Subordinate units ==
- HHD Signal Company
- USANEC-QATAR
- 518th TIN Signal Company - Deactivated
- 550TH Signal Company - Deactivated
- 580th Signal Company - Deactivated
- 278th Signal Company - Deactivated

== Lineage ==
Constituted 3 February 1944 in the Army of the United States as the 25th Signal Construction Battalion.

Activated 14 April 1944 at Camp Forrest, Tennessee, as the 25th Signal Light Construction Battalion.

Reorganized and redesignated 26 June 1944 as the 25th Signal Heavy Construction Battalion.

Inactivated 6 April 1946 in Japan.

Redesignated 20 November 1951 as the 25th Signal Construction Battalion and allotted to the Regular Army.

Activated 1 December 1951 at Camp Edwards, Massachusetts.

Reorganized and redesignated 20 October 1953 as the 25th Signal Battalion.

Inactivated 1 October 1968 in Germany.

Activated 18 January 1971 at Fort Bragg, North Carolina.

Inactivated 15 October 1993 at Fort Bragg, North Carolina.

Headquarters and Headquarters Detachment activated 16 October 2003 in Qatar.

== Campaign participation credit ==
World War II: Rhineland; Central Europe; Asiatic-Pacific Theater, Streamer without inscription.

Southwest Asia: Defense of Saudi Arabia; Liberation and Defense of Kuwait.

War on Terrorism: Global war on terrorism.

== Decorations ==
- Meritorious Unit Commendation (Army) for SOUTHWEST ASIA 1990–1991.
- Meritorious Unit Commendation (Army), Streamer embroidered SOUTHWEST ASIA 2004–2005.
