= 505th Signal Brigade (United States) =

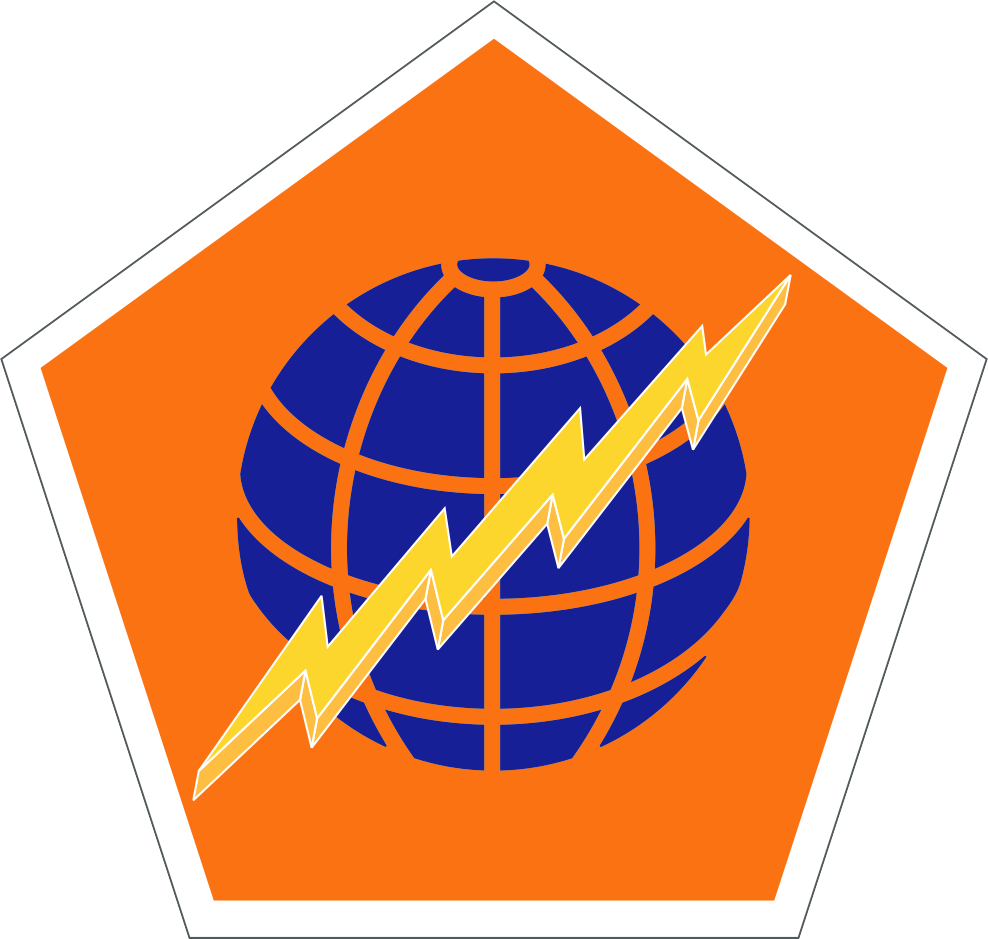
- Active: 1944-present
- Country: United States
- Branch: United States Army Reserve
- Role: Signal
- Size: Brigade
- Part of: 335th Signal Command (Theater)
- Garrison/HQ: Las Vegas, Nevada
- Motto: Totus Pro Patria (All For Our Country)
- Website: https://www.facebook.com/505thTTSB/

Commanders
- Current commander: COL Aaron T. Jones
- Command Sergeant Major: CSM Jeramie A. Baty

Insignia
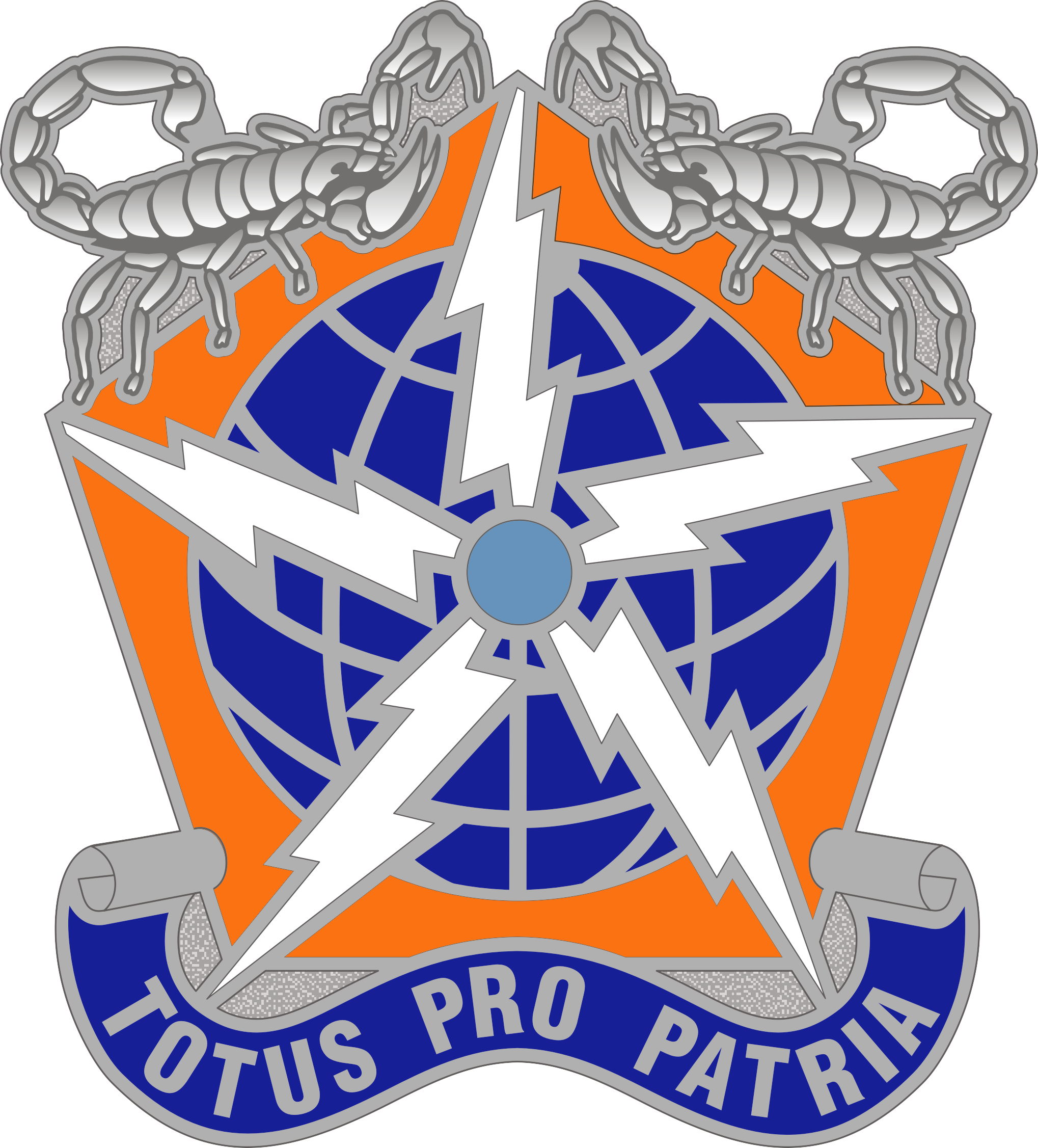
- 505 Signal Brigade DUI

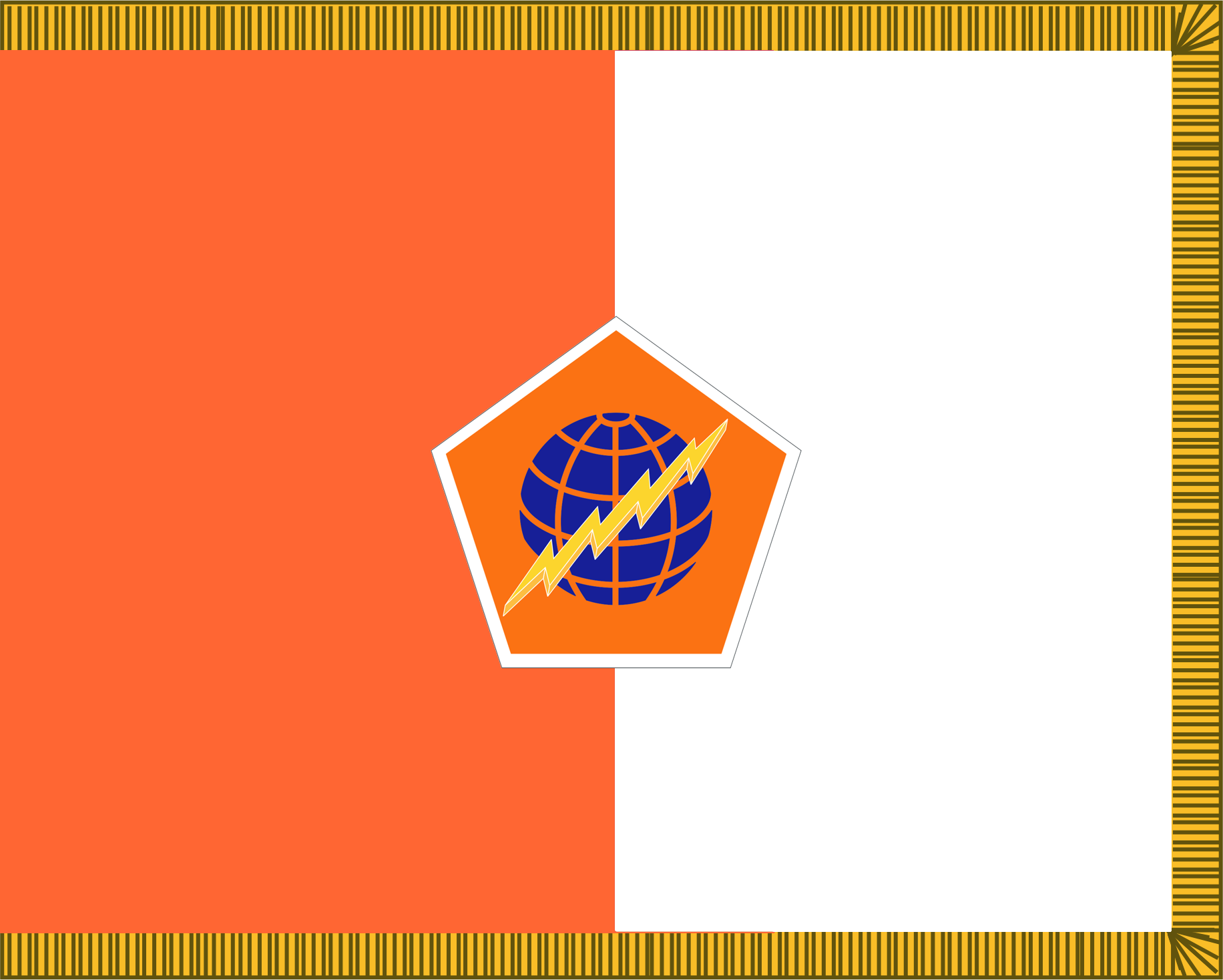
- 505th Signal Brigade Flag

The 505th Signal Brigade (United States) is a unit of the US Army Reserve. The unit was originally the 3146th Signal Service Group in 1944 and served in France and Germany during World War II earning campaign streamers for Northern France, Rhineland and Central Europe. It also earned three Meritorious Unit Commendations from 1944-1945. In the ETO, the unit was assigned to 12th Army and was assigned to signals intelligence or "reading the enemy's mail." After the German surrender, the unit was setting up VHF relay stations.

In 1946 the unit was redesignated as HHD 505th Signal Service Group and moved to Fort Shafter, Hawaii. It was inactivated in 1948.

In 1952 it was reorganized in the Regular Army at Camp San Luis Obispo, California and quickly redesignated HHD 505th Signal Group. It was again inactivated in 1965.

In 2009 it was reorganized again to the Army Reserve and redesignated HHC, 505th Signal Brigade. It moved to Las Vegas, Nevada in 2011.

== Organization ==
The brigade is a subordinate unit of the 335th Signal Command (Theater). As of January 2026 the brigade consists of the following units:

- 505th Signal Brigade (Theater Tactical), in Las Vegas (NV)
  - Headquarters and Headquarters Company, in Las Vegas (NV)
  - 98th Expeditionary Signal Battalion, in Mesa (AZ)
    - Headquarters and Headquarters Company, in Mesa (AZ)
    - Alpha Company, 98th Expeditionary Signal Battalion, in Denver (CO)
    - Bravo Company, 98th Expeditionary Signal Battalion, in Mesa (AZ)
    - Charlie Company, 98th Expeditionary Signal Battalion, in San Diego (CA)
    - 820th Signal Company (Tactical Installation/Networking), in Seagoville (TX)
      - Detachment 1, 820th Signal Company (Tactical Installation/Networking), in Denton (TX)
  - 319th Expeditionary Signal Battalion, in Sacramento (CA)
    - Headquarters and Headquarters Company, in Sacramento (CA)
    - Alpha Company, 319th Expeditionary Signal Battalion, in Sacramento (CA)
    - Bravo Company, 319th Expeditionary Signal Battalion, at Camp Parks (CA)
    - Charlie Company, 319th Expeditionary Signal Battalion, in Sacramento (CA)
    - 812th Signal Company (Tactical Installation/Networking), in Vallejo (CA)
