= 160th Theater Signal Brigade =

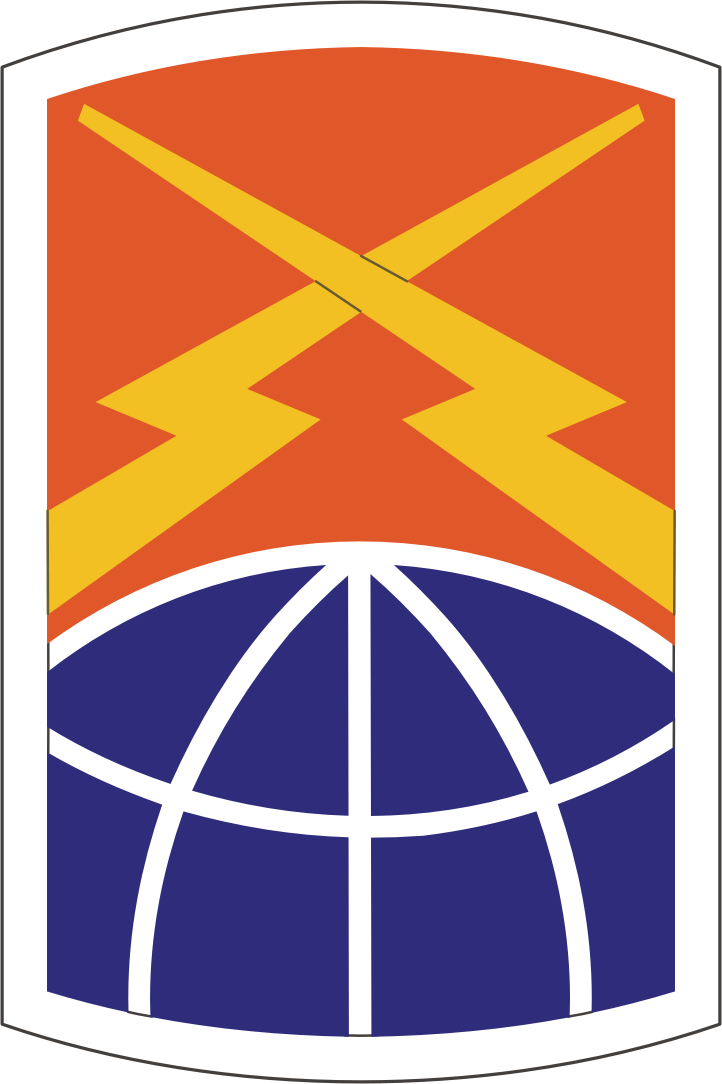
- 160th Theater Signal Brigade Insignia
- Active: 1945–1947 1955–1961 1963–1972 1974–1991 2003 – present
- Country: United States
- Allegiance: NETCOM
- Branch: United States Army
- Type: Communications
- Size: Brigade
- Part of: United States Army Central
- Garrison/HQ: Camp Arifjan, Kuwait
- Motto: "Finest of the First"
- Colors: Orange and white are the colors associated with the Signal Corps, and the color blue refers to the unit's capability to support the combat mission. The yellow flashes are an allusion to the basic mission of the organization and along with the globe, denoting the worldwide scope of the unit's mission and the US Army Communications Command.
- Engagements: World War II, Vietnam, Operation Enduring Freedom Operation Iraqi Freedom

Commanders
- Current commander: Colonel Kenneth W. Roedl

Insignia
- Distinctive Unit Insignia

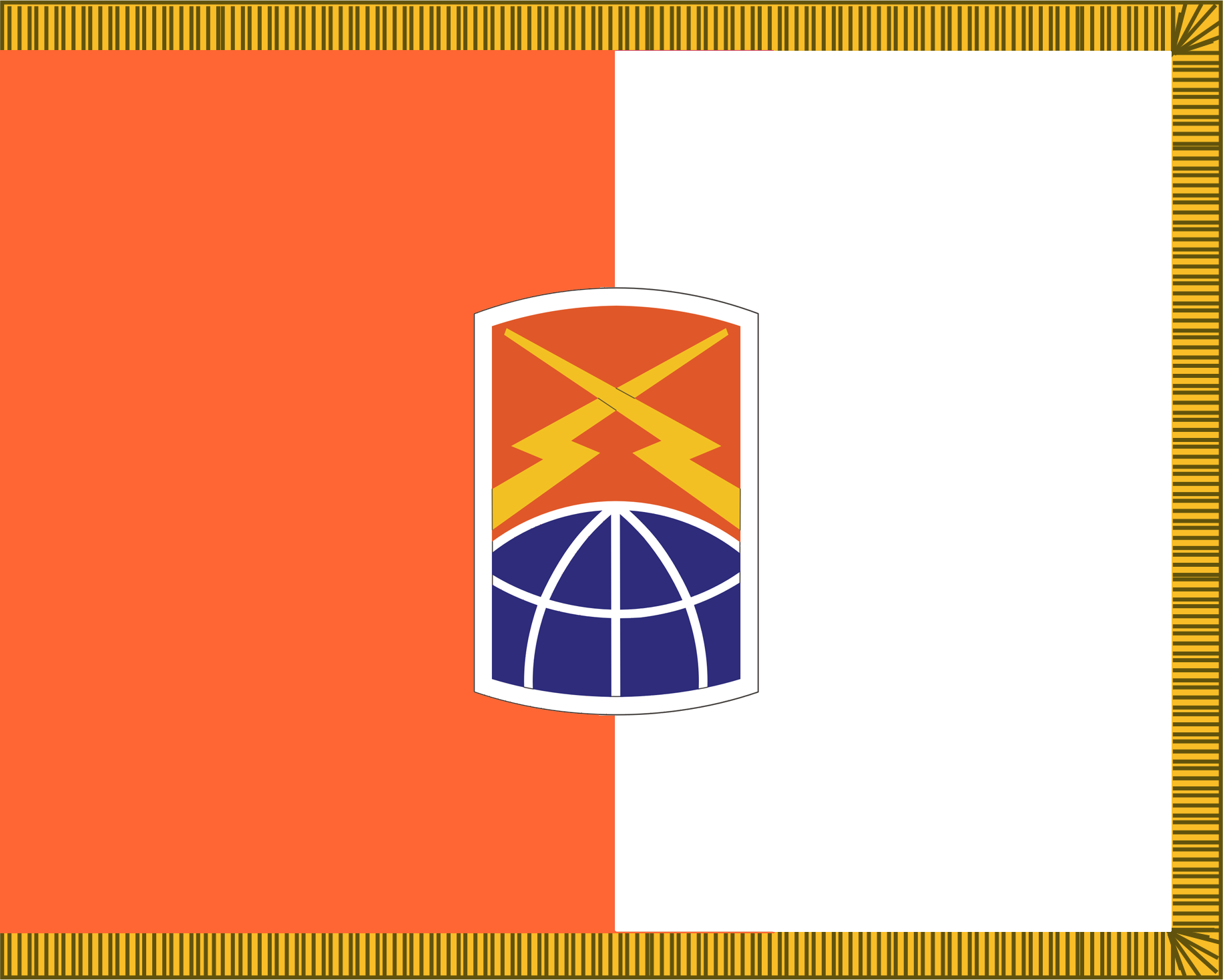
- 160th Signal Brigade Flag

The 160th Theater Signal Brigade is a communications formation of the United States Army, currently based at Camp Arifjan, Kuwait. It traces its history back to the end of the Second World War.

== Mission ==
The 160th Strategic Signal Brigade is formally tasked to 'provide the United States Army Central Command and Third United States Army with enterprise communications capabilities necessary to accomplish missions throughout the Southwest Asia and the United States Central Command area of responsibility.'

== Brigade history ==
The history of the Headquarters 160th Theater Signal Brigade dates back to World War II. On 6 March 1945, the 3160th Signal Services Battalion was activated in France, under the 12th Army Group. The unit's mission was to provide radio and wire communications, and messenger service. For its participation in the Europe and Rhineland campaigns, the unit was awarded the Meritorious Unit Commendation with Battle Streamer. The 3160th Signal Services Battalion was deactivated in Germany on 20 June 1947.

On 3 December 1954, the 3160th Signal Services Battalion was re-designated as Headquarters and Headquarters Detachment, 160th Signal Group. Allotted to the Regular Army, the unit was reactivated in Germany on 28 January 1955, with the mission of providing fixed station communications throughout Germany. It was subsequently deactivated on 1 October 1961.

On 25 March 1963, the 160th Signal Group was reactivated again and assigned to the 13th Support Brigade at Fort Hood, Texas. Destined for the Vietnam War, the 160th Signal Group arrived in Vietnam on 20 April 1967, and provided headquarters support in the Saigon and Long Binh area. The 160th Signal Group also provided cable construction, photographic, and communications security logistics support throughout the country. The unit received eight Battle Streamers for its participation in 14 campaigns including Counteroffensive, Phases II through VII, the Tet Counteroffensive, Consolidation and the Cease-fire. The 160th Signal Group returned to the United States, where it was deactivated on 3 June 1972 at Oakland, California.

The 160th Signal Group was reactivated for the third time on 1 July 1974, at Karlsruhe Germany and re-designated on 1 October 1979, as Headquarters and Headquarters Detachment, 160th Theater Signal Brigade, part of United States Army Europe. Its mission was to provide information mission area services, command, control and support of fixed station communications throughout Southern Germany and the United Kingdom. On 15 April 1991, the reorganization of the 5th Signal Command began with the brigade assuming the strategic communications mission for the entire theater. On 23 August 1991, the brigade was inactivated and its mission was assumed by the 302nd Signal Battalion.

The Headquarters 160th Theater Signal Brigade was re-activated for the fourth time on 3 September 2003, at Camp Arifjan, Kuwait with two battalions: the 25th and 54th Signal Battalions. The Headquarters 160th Theater Signal Brigade continues to provide the United States Army Central Command and Third United States Army with enterprise communications capabilities necessary to accomplish missions throughout Southwest Asia and the United States Central Command area of responsibility.

== Subordinate units ==
- Headquarters and Headquarters Company (HHC), 160th Theater Signal Brigade
  - S1 – Personnel
  - S2 – Intelligence & Security
  - S3 – Operations
  - S4 – Logistics
- 25th Signal Battalion
  - HHD 25th Signal Battalion
  - US Army Network Enterprise Center – Qatar (formerly 580th Signal Company)
- 54th Strategic Signal Battalion
  - HHD 54th Strategic Signal Battalion
  - USASA Kuwait Defense Satellite Communication Systems (USASA-Kuwait DSCS, formerly 56th Signal Company)
  - US Army Network Enterprise Center – Arifjan (USANEC-Arifjan, formerly 228th Signal Company)
  - US Army Network Enterprise Center – Kuwait (USANEC-Kuwait, formerly 519th Signal Company)
  - US Army Network Enterprise Center - Buerhing

== Former Commanders ==
- Colonel Kenneth W. Roedl, 2026- Present
- Colonel Detrick L. Ousby, 2025-2026
- Colonel Thomas J. Paff, 2024-2025
- Colonel Michael J. Temko, 2022-2024
- Colonel Alton J. Johnson, 2020-2022
- Colonel Paul S. Sparks, 2018-2020
- Colonel Kevin L. Griggs, 2016–2018
- Colonel Duane K. Green, 2014–2016
- Colonel Linda C. Jantzen, 2012–2014
- Colonel Maria B. Barrett, 2010–2012
- Colonel Ronald R. Stimeare 2008-2010
- Colonel John M. Schleifer 2006-2008
- Colonel William J. Scott, 2005–2006
- Colonel John A. Wilcox, 2004-2005
- Colonel John M. Blaine III, 2003-2004
