= 311th Signal Command (Theater) =

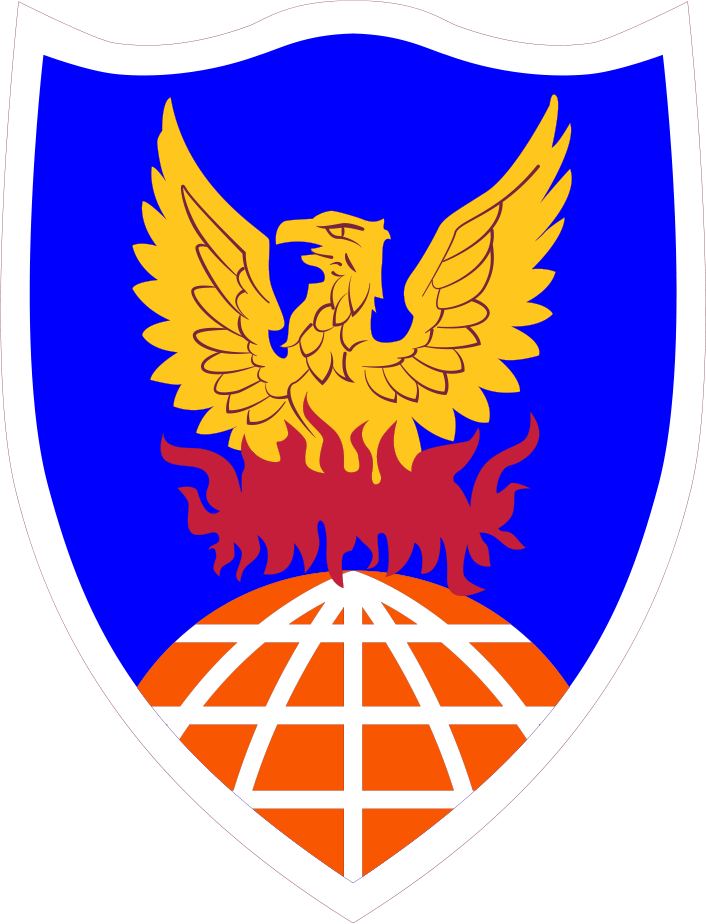
- Shoulder Sleeve Insignia
- Active: 1944 - Present
- Country: United States
- Allegiance: NETCOM
- Branch: United States Army
- Role: Theater Signal Command
- Part of: United States Army Pacific
- Garrison/HQ: Fort Shafter, Hawaii
- Colors: Blue, Monarch Orange
- Engagements: World War II

Commanders
- Current commander: Brigadier General: Tonri Brown

Insignia
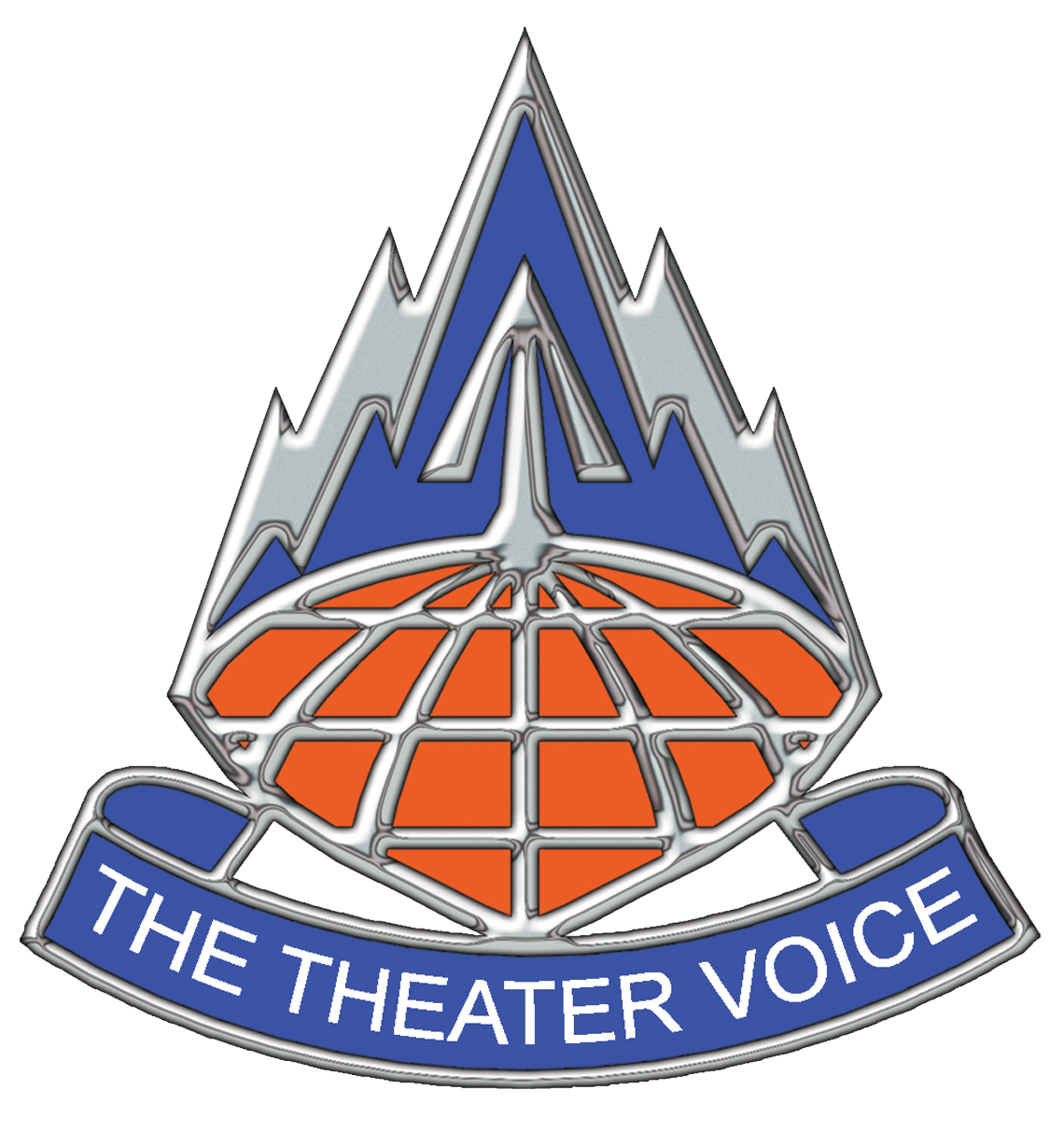
- Distinctive Unit Insignia

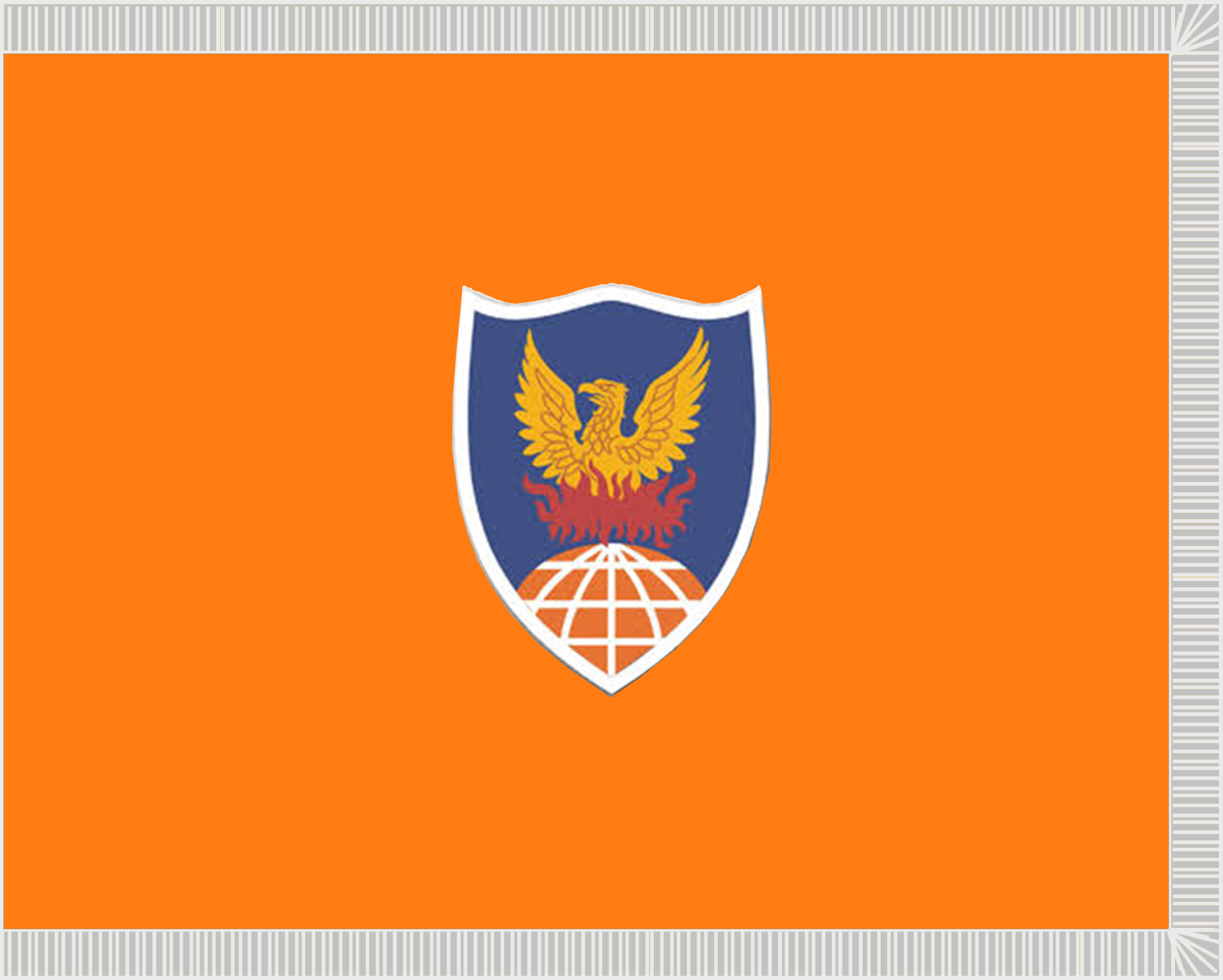
- 311th Signal Command Flag

The 311th Signal Command (Theater) (311 TSC) is the designated signal command for the Army Service Component Commands within the Pacific and Korean theaters. The staff of 311th Signal Command (Theater) consists of more than 3000 active-duty soldiers, U.S. Army Reserve soldiers and Army civilians. Headquartered at Fort Shafter, Hawaii, the 311th SC(T) and its subordinate units are stationed across 16 time zones, ranging from Alaska to Korea, and from Hawaii to California.

== History ==
The 311th Signal Command (Theater) originated in 1944 as the 3112th Signal Service Battalion at Fort Monmouth, NJ, supporting Allied efforts during World War II. The 3112th participated in campaigns in Normandy, northern France, Rhineland, Ardennes-Alsace and central Europe. The 3112th Signal was reorganized multiple times until it became the 311th Signal Group in 1952 as part of the Organized Reserve Corps. Due to growing requirements within the Army, the 311th was identified to become a general officer and a theater-level command with the subsequent designation as the 311th Signal Command (Theater) at Fort Meade, Md., in 1996. Ten years later, in September 2006, the 311th SC (T) was reorganized to become the 311th Signal Command (Theater) and relocated to Fort Shafter, Hawaii to become a theater enabling command of U.S. Army Pacific.

Reorganized to support modularization and transformation of the Army in the Pacific, the 311th Signal Command (Theater) combines the strengths of active duty soldiers, a U.S. Army Reserve Command (USARC) component force and a team of civilian employees, to ensure secure communications throughout the theater.

== Purpose ==
The mission of the 311th is to maintain and defend the Pacific LandWarNet (PLWN), a secure Army network used throughout the Pacific region. Serving as the operational Signal command for U.S. Army Pacific (USARPAC), the 311th SC(T) is tasked with ensuring the PLWN can be extended to support the deployment and integration of Army units called to execute contingency operations within the Pacific.

In addition to providing support for USARPAC missions with critical planning and execution of signal support, the 311th SC(T) maintains and upgrades the PLWN to sufficiently support USARPAC’s Major Subordinate Commands (MSCs) and its sister Theater Enabling Commands (TECs).

The 311th Signal Command (Theater) also cooperates with the 9th Signal Command (Army)/NETCOM’s Global Network Enterprise objectives. Through this administrative command relationship, the unit ensures that the Army CIO/G6 and 9th Signal Command’s Army enterprise network standards are supported and implemented throughout the Pacific theater in order to establish a single global Army communications network.

== Organization ==
- 1st Signal Brigade, South Korea
- 516th Signal Brigade, Hawaii

== LandWarNet ==
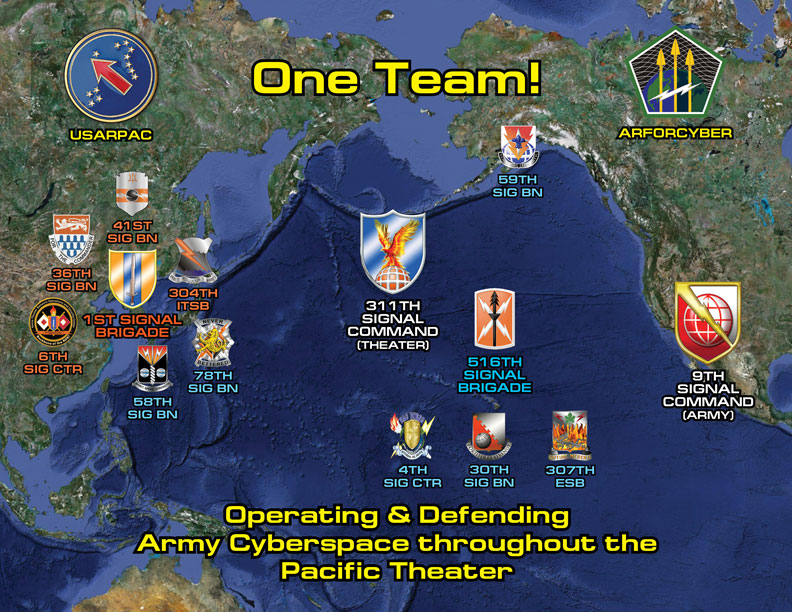

The Pacific LandWarNet is the communications architecture for the U.S. Army Pacific AOR. It serves as the command and control information network throughout the Pacific theater. Pacific LandWarNet supports missions associated with the integration of strategic, operational and tactical communications, and data exchange requirements within the AOR. Pacific LandWarNet supports the operations of Joint, combined, and Army forces, supporting day-to-day operations. The network can be extended to enable forward-stationed and CONUS-based military formations.

== Mission Essential Task List (METL) ==
- Command and control subordinate forces
- Provide sustainment
- Protect the force
- Conduct Information Dissemination Management and Content Staging (IDM/CS)
- Implement Enterprise Architectures and Policies
- Conduct Network Management and Enterprise Systems Management (NME SM)
- Provide Information Assurance and Computer Network Defense (IA/CND)
- Computer Network Defense (IA/CND)

== Lineage and honors ==
- Constituted 26 January 1944 in the Army of the United States as Headquarters, 3112th Signal Service Battalion.
- Activated 1 February 1944 at Fort Monmouth, New Jersey.
- Reorganized and redesignated 7 June 1945 as Headquarters and Headquarters Company, 3112th Signal Service Battalion.
- Inactivated 5 December 1946 in Germany.
- Redesignated 27 March 1952 as Headquarters and Headquarters Company, 311th Signal group, and allotted to the organized Reserve Corps.
- Activated 10 April 1952 at Baltimore, Maryland.(Organized Reserve Corps redesignated 9 July 1952 as the Army Reserve).
- Reorganized and redesignated 26 April 1954 as Headquarters and Headquarters Detachment, 311th Signal Group.
- Inactivated 20 February 1963 at Baltimore, Maryland.
- Redesignated 16 June 1996 as Headquarters and Headquarters Company, 311th Signal Command (Theater), and activated at Fort George G. Meade, Maryland.
- Location of Headquarters changed on 16 September 2006 to Fort Shafter, Hawaii.

== Patch ==
Symbolism: The Phoenix arising from the flame represents rebirth and is indicative of a new command. The orange demi-globe symbolizes the worldwide capabilities of the organization. The blue background alludes to the sky and the transmission of voice, pictures and data via satellite. The shoulder sleeve insignia was approved on 22 March 1996.

== Insignia ==
Symbolism: Orange and white (silver) are the colors used for Signal organizations The arrowhead represents combat readiness and points to the sky, symbolizing the transmission of data via satellite. The globe symbolizes the worldwide capability of the organization. The motto highlights the unit’s mission as the theater’s communication link. The distinctive unit insignia was approved on 22 March 1996.

== See also ==
- Signal Corps (United States Army)
- United States Army Cyber Command
- Army Network Enterprise Technology Command (NETCOM)/9th Army Signal Command
