= 359th Signal Brigade =

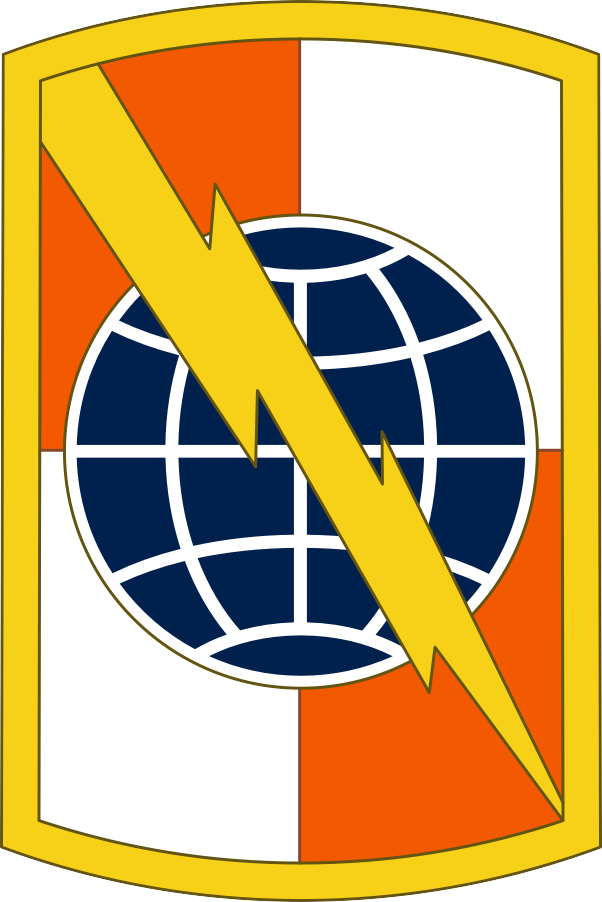
- Active: 1944-present
- Country: United States
- Branch: United States Army Reserve
- Role: Signal
- Size: Brigade
- Part of: 335th Signal Command (Theater)
- Garrison/HQ: Fort Gordon, Georgia
- Motto: Command Communication
- Website: https://www.facebook.com/359thTTSB/

Commanders
- Current commander: BG Tonri Brown

Insignia
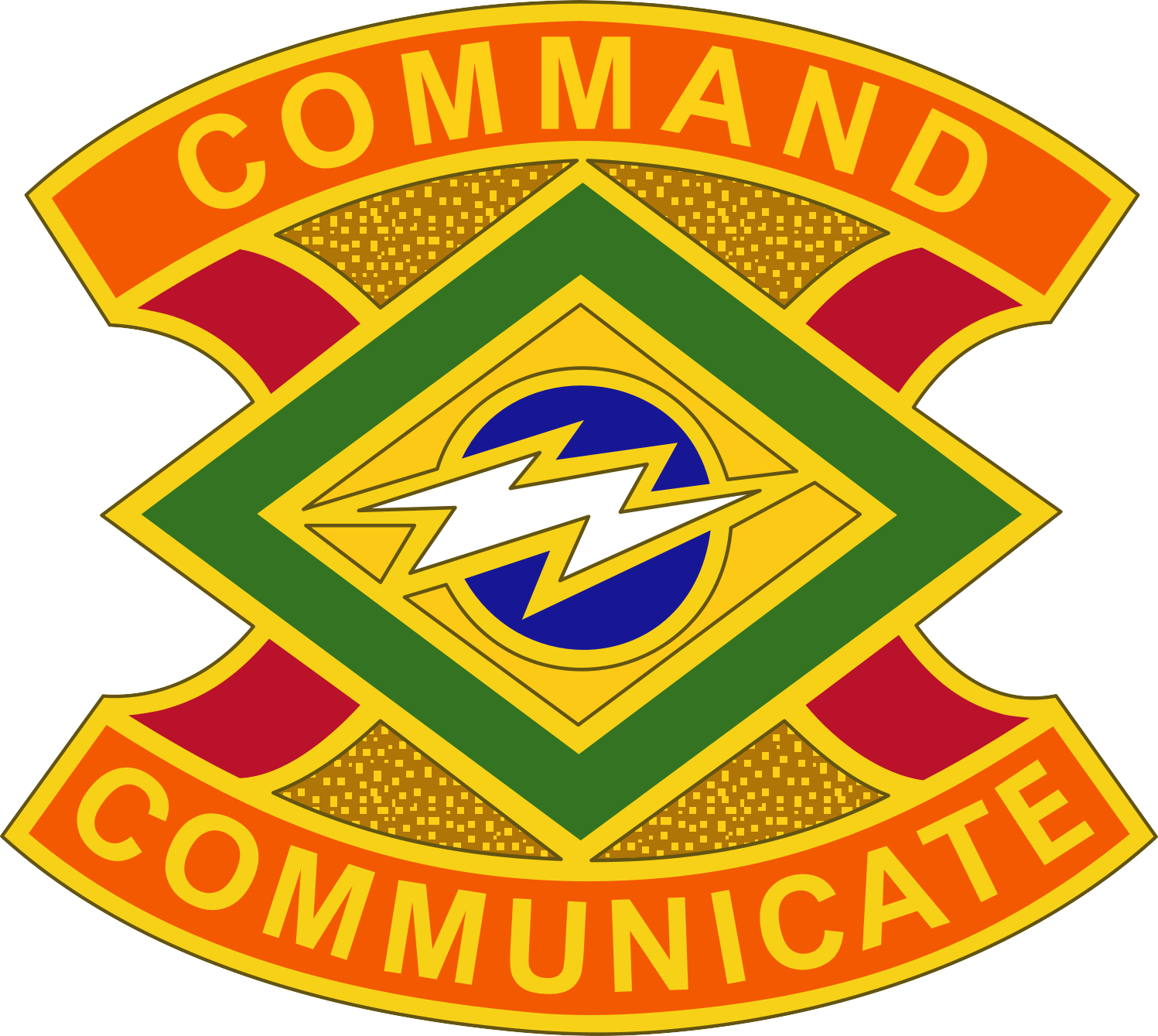
- 359th Signal Brigade DUI

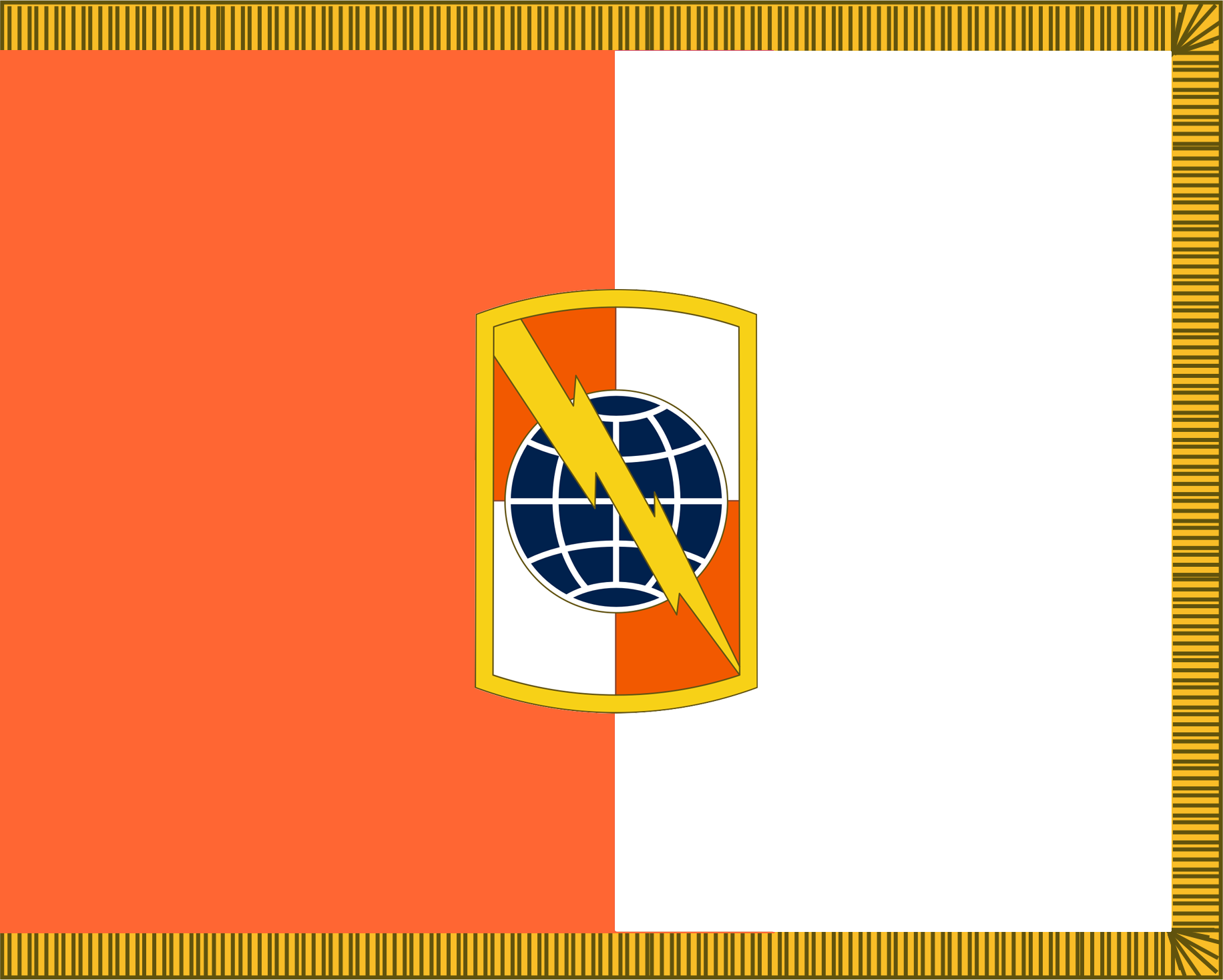
- 359th Signal Brigade Flag

The 359th Signal Brigade (Theater Tactical) is a unit of the US Army Reserve. The unit began as the HHD, 3359th Signal Service Battalion in 1944 as a part of the US forces in Brazil during World War II monitoring and relaying messages to Army Air Force planes in North Africa. The unit earned the American Theater campaign streamer and a Meritorious Unit Commendation.

The unit was inactive from 1945-1955 when it was redesignated as HHD, 359th Signal Group as a part of the Army Reserve in New York City. It was again inactive from 1963-1968 when it was reactivated and moved to Syracuse, N.Y. It was again redesignated 1987 as the 359th Signal Brigade. In 1995 the brigade moved to Fort Gordon, Georgia.

The unit was federalized for the Global War on Terror from 2010-2011 when it would earn a second Meritorious Unit Commendation and an Afghanistan campaign streamer for the Consolidation III campaign.

== Organization ==
The brigade is a subordinate unit of the 335th Signal Command (Theater). As of January 2026 the brigade consists of the following units:

- 359th Signal Brigade (Theater Tactical), at Fort Gordon (GA)
  - Headquarters and Headquarters Company, at Fort Gordon (GA)
  - 982nd Signal Company (Combat Camera), in East Point (GA)
    - Detachment 1, 982nd Signal Company (Combat Camera), in Baltimore (MD)
  - 324th Expeditionary Signal Battalion, at Fort Gordon (GA)
    - Headquarters and Headquarters Company, at Fort Gordon (GA)
    - Alpha Company, 324th Expeditionary Signal Battalion, in Greenville (SC)
    - Bravo Company, 324th Expeditionary Signal Battalion, at Fort Gordon (GA)
    - Charlie Company, 324th Expeditionary Signal Battalion, in East Point (GA)
    - 842nd Signal Company (Tactical Installation/Networking), in Milton (FL)
  - 392nd Expeditionary Signal Battalion - Enhanced, in Baltimore (MD)
    - Headquarters and Headquarters Company, in Baltimore (MD)
    - Alpha Company, 392nd Expeditionary Signal Battalion - Enhanced, at Fort Detrick (MD)
      - Detachment 1, Alpha Company, 392nd Expeditionary Signal Battalion - Enhanced, at Fort Pickett (VA)
    - Bravo Company, 392nd Expeditionary Signal Battalion - Enhanced, in Tobyhanna (PA)
      - Detachment 1, Bravo Company, 392nd Expeditionary Signal Battalion - Enhanced, at Fort Indiantown Gap (PA)
    - Charlie Company, 392nd Expeditionary Signal Battalion - Enhanced, in Baltimore (MD)
    - 490th Signal Company (Tactical Installation/Networking), in Blacklick (OH)
    - 558th Brigade Signal Company (MEB/CAB/SB), in Maineville (OH)
