= Signals brigade =

A signals brigade is a specialised form of military brigade dedicated to providing communications. Other brigades might have a signals component, but a signals brigade is a brigade dedicated to information and communication support (ICS) for both operational and administrative functions. It may also contain elements of life support for military headquarters.

== List of signals brigades ==
- Royal Corps of Signals
  - 1st Signal Brigade
  - 2nd (National Communications) Signal Brigade
  - 11th Signal Brigade
- Indian Army
  - 6 Signals Brigades for each of the Combatant Commands of the Army
  - 3 Signals Brigades for three of the Strike Corps of the Western Command and Northern Command.
- Serbian Armed Forces
  - Signal Brigade (Serbia)
- Sri Lanka Signals Corps
  - Signal Brigade (Sri Lanka)
- U.S. Army Signal Corps
  - 1st Signal Brigade, subordinate to the Eighth United States Army
  - 2nd Signal Brigade, subordinate to the 5th Signal Command
  - 3rd Signal Brigade, former unit subordinate to the III Corps
  - 7th Signal Brigade, subordinate to the 5th Signal Command
  - 11th Signal Brigade, an element of Army Forces Command
  - 15th Signal Brigade, based at Fort Gordon
  - 22nd Signal Brigade, former unit subordinate to the V Corps
  - 35th Signal Brigade, an element of Army Forces Command
  - 93rd Signal Brigade, subordinate to the 7th Signal Command
  - 160th Signal Brigade, support the United States Central Command and Third United States Army
  - 261st Theater Tactical Signal Brigade, a unit in the Delaware Army National Guard
  - 516th Signal Brigade, subordinate to the 311th Signal Command

== See also ==
- Military communications
