= Dennis L. Via =

United States Army general

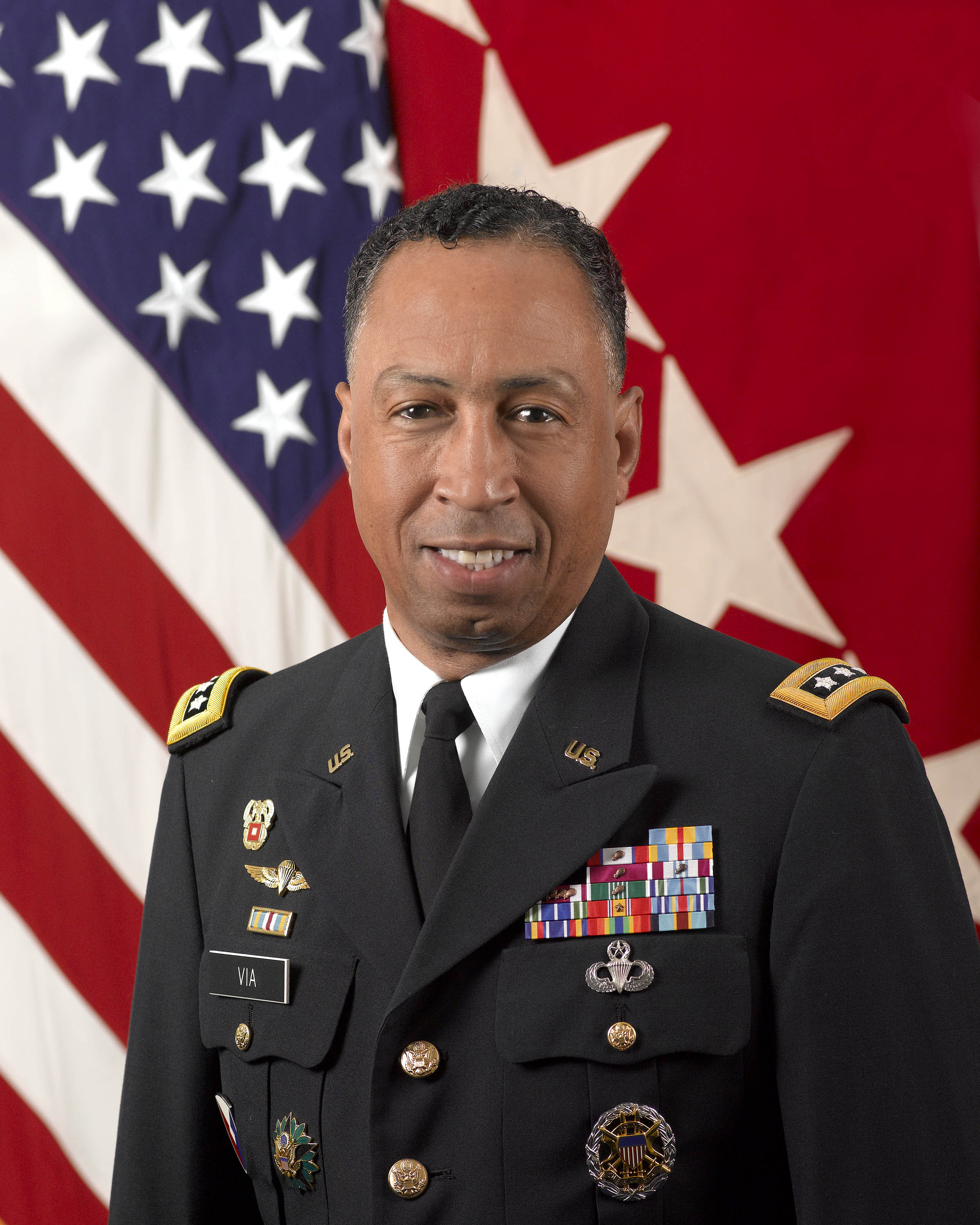
- Official portrait, 2012
- Born: 1957 or 1958 (age 68–69); Martinsville, Virginia, U.S.
- Military career
- Allegiance: United States
- Branch: United States Army
- Service years: 1980–2016
- Rank: General
- Commands: United States Army Materiel Command; 5th Signal Command; 3rd Signal Brigade; 82nd Signal Battalion
- Awards: Defense Distinguished Service Medal; Army Distinguished Service Medal (2); Defense Superior Service Medal; Legion of Merit (2)

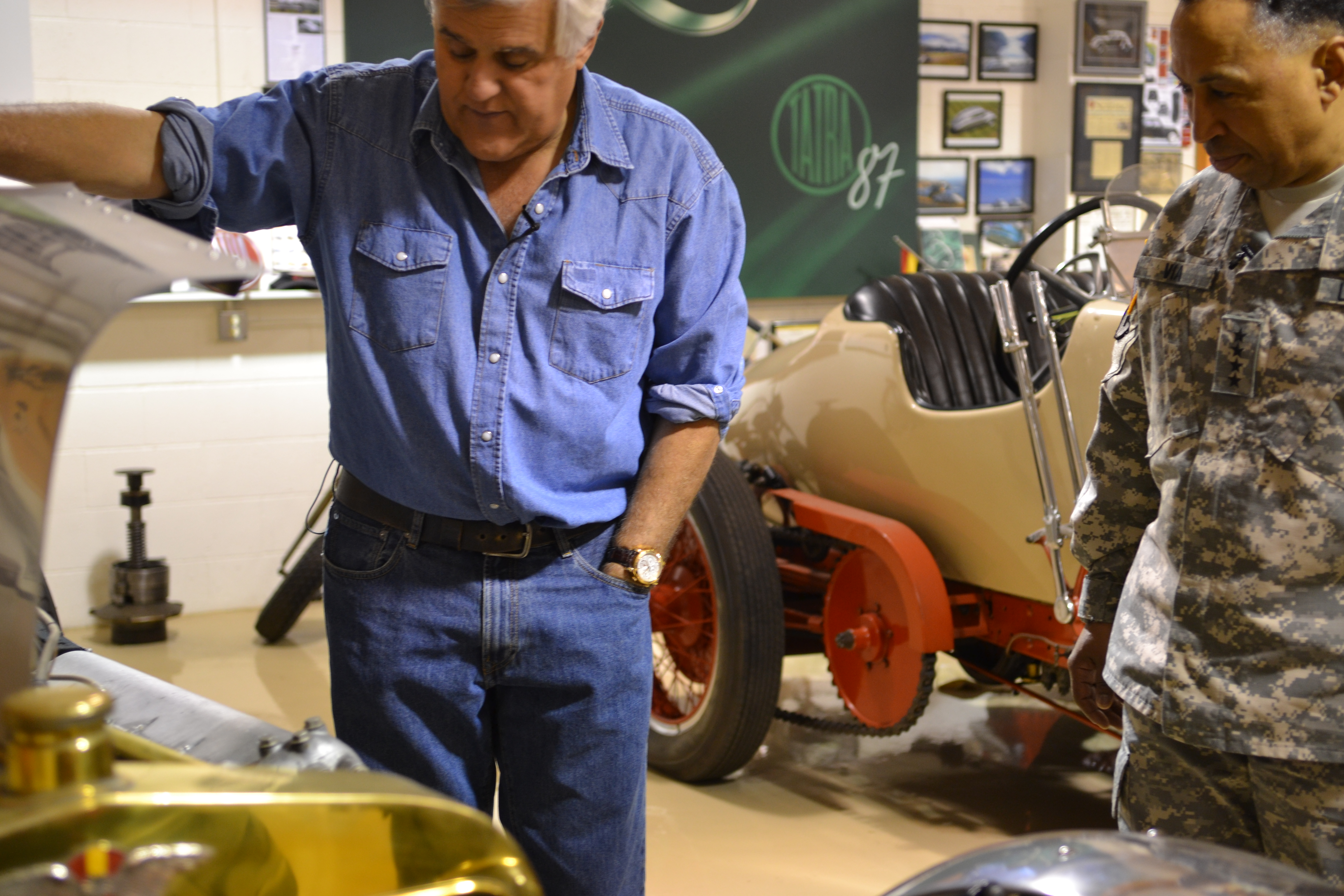
General Via on Jay Leno's Garage describing the Army's fuel efficient demonstration vehicle FED Alpha

Dennis L. Via (born 1957 or 1958) is a retired United States Army four-star general who last served as the 18th commanding general of the United States Army Materiel Command from 7 August 2012 to 30 September 2016. He is the first Signal Corps officer since General Henry H. Arnold to achieve four-star rank. He retired from the army on 30 September 2016 after over 36 years of service.

== Military career ==
A native of Martinsville, Virginia, Via was commissioned on 18 May 1980, in the Signal Corps after graduating as a Distinguished Military Graduate from Virginia State University. He holds a master's degree from Boston University, and is a graduate of the United States Army Command and General Staff College (class of 1991) and the United States Army War College (class of 1999).

Via began his career with the 35th Signal Brigade, XVIII Airborne Corps, Fort Bragg.

Via's prior assignment was as AMC's Deputy Commanding General. He deployed to Southwest Asia in October 2011 as the Commander, AMC Responsible Reset Task Force with the mission of leading the strategic integration of the Materiel Enterprise for the Retrograde of equipment and materiel out of Iraq at the conclusion of Operation New Dawn. Prior to that, he served as Director for Command, Control, Communications and Computer Systems, J-6, The Joint Staff, Washington, D.C.

Via's command assignments include the 82nd Signal Battalion, 82nd Airborne Division, Fort Bragg, N.C.; 3rd Signal Brigade, III Armored Corps, Fort Hood, Texas; 5th Signal Command, United States Army Europe and 7th Army, Mannheim, Germany; and the United States Army Communications-Electronics Life Cycle Management Command and Fort Monmouth, Fort Monmouth, N.J. His key staff assignments include Aide-de-Camp to the Chief of Staff, Allied Forces Southern Europe, Naples, Italy; Operations Officer, J-6, Armed Forces Inaugural Committee, Washington, DC; Division Chief, Joint Requirements Oversight Council (JROC), Office of the Deputy Chief of Staff, G-8, United States Army, Washington, DC; Principal Director for Operations, Defense Information Systems Agency/Deputy Commander, Joint Task Force-Global Network Operations, United States Strategic Command, Arlington, Va.

== Awards and decorations ==
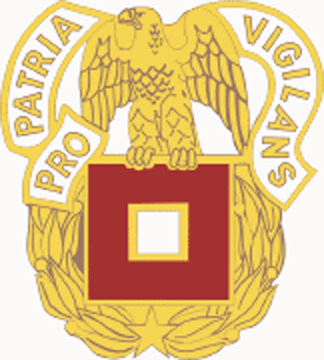
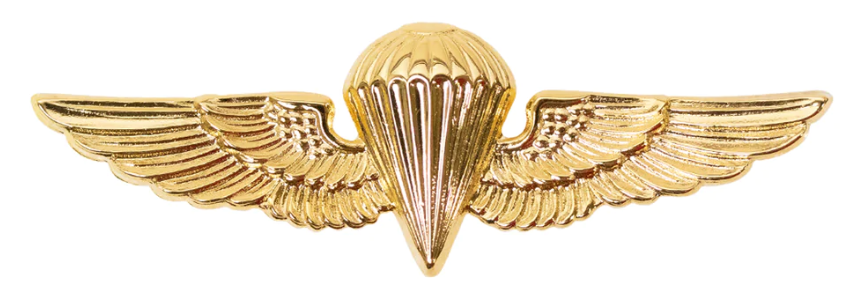
Master Parachutist Badge
Joint Chiefs of Staff Identification Badge
Army Staff Identification Badge
Army Material Command Combat Service Identification Badge
Army Signal Corps Distinctive Unit Insignia
Honduran Parachutist Badge

Defense Distinguished Service Medal
Army Distinguished Service Medal with one bronze oak leaf cluster
Defense Superior Service Medal
Legion of Merit with one bronze oak leaf cluster
Defense Meritorious Service Medal with one bronze oak leaf cluster
Meritorious Service Medal with four oak leaf clusters
Army Commendation Medal with one bronze oak leaf cluster
Joint Service Achievement Medal
Army Achievement Medal
Joint Meritorious Unit Award
National Defense Service Medal with one bronze service star
Global War on Terrorism Expeditionary Medal
Global War on Terrorism Service Medal
Army Service Ribbon
Overseas Service Ribbon

Military offices
Preceded by Ann E. Dunwoody	Commander, United States Army Materiel Command; 2012–2016	Succeeded by Gustave F. Perna
