= 5th Signal Command (United States) =

5th Signal Command (Theater)
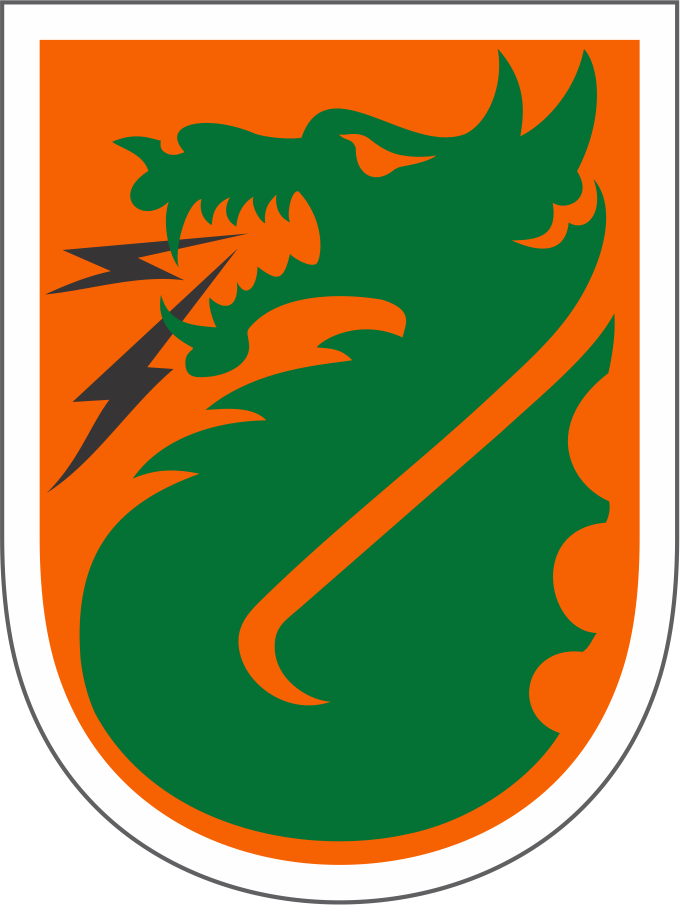
- 5th Signal Command Shoulder Sleeve Insignia
- Active: 1974–4 August 2017
- Country: United States
- Branch: United States Army
- Role: Tactical and Strategic Communications Support
- Installation: Clay Kaserne, Germany
- Nickname: Dragon Warriors
- Mottos: "Dragon Warriors, Dragon Standards"
- Colors: Orange and white
- Anniversaries: 1 July 1974

Commanders
- Current commander: Colonel Rob Parker

Insignia
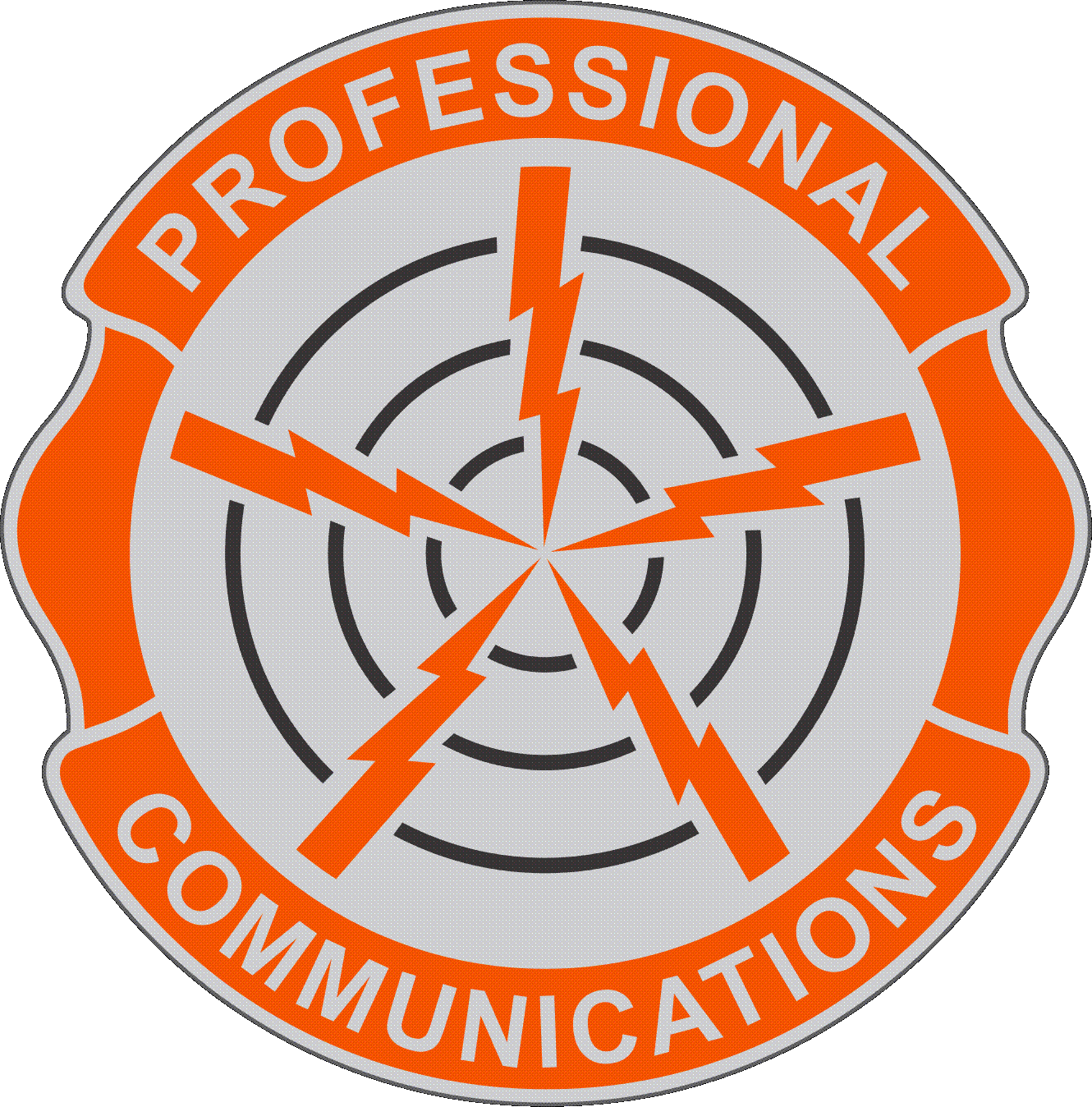
- Distinctive Unit Insignia

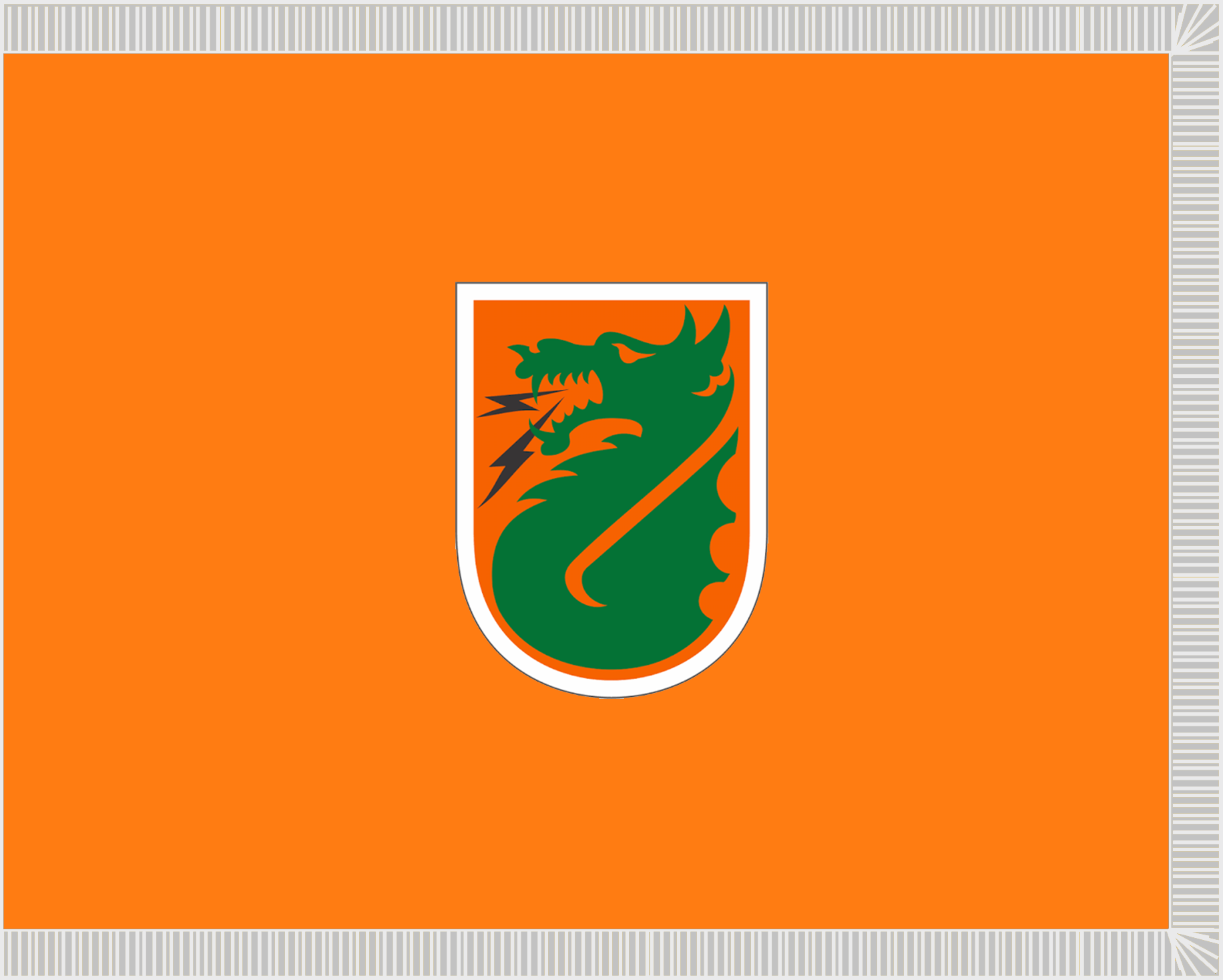
- 5th Signal Command Flag

The 5th Signal Command (Theater) ("Dragon Warriors") was a European-based tactical and strategic communications organization of the United States Army specializing in command and control which supported theater-limited, joint-forces, and combined forces activities. The command's mission was to build, operate and defend network capabilities to enable mission command and create tactical, operational and strategic flexibility for Army, Joint and Multinational forces in the EUCOM and AFRICOM areas of responsibility.

== History ==
=== Formation ===
This section contains public-domain text taken from The History of the 5th Signal Command

The 5th Signal Command was constituted 1 July 1974 in the Regular Army as Headquarters and Headquarters Company, 5th Signal Command, and activated in Germany.

Headquartered in Wiesbaden, Germany, provided forward-based deployable command and control communications supporting theater, joint, and combined forces. It used the Global Information Grid (GIG) to enable extension and reachback capabilities for the Commander, United States European Command (EUCOM). The command's primary focus was to support U.S. Army units and organizations based in Europe. Likewise, EUCOM headquarters also has support from Department of Defense-level communications organizations that support networks and services not provided by 5th Signal Command.

Consisting of the 2nd Signal Brigade, the command was a major subordinate command of the U.S. Army Network Enterprise Technology Command (NETCOM) / 9th Signal Command (Army), headquartered at Fort Huachuca, Arizona. However, the Commanding General of U.S. Army, Europe (USAREUR) and Seventh Army was assigned operational control of the command. 5th Signal Command's commanding general also served as the deputy chief of staff, G-6 (chief information officer) for USAREUR and Seventh Army.

Headquarters, 5th Signal Command was constituted in the Regular Army and activated in Germany on 1 July 1974. The Command traces its original heritage to the U.S. Army Signal Command, Europe, organized under USAREUR General Order dated 20 March 1958, which consolidated military communications in the European Theater. It consisted of the 4th and 516th Signal Groups and 102nd Signal Battalion supporting Army Group, Central Europe; NATO; USAREUR; and other elements in Europe as directed.

The organization expanded from 1961 to 1964, adding 22nd and 106th Signal Groups, with theater responsibilities extending from Belgium, through France and Germany, to Italy. The effort to meet the challenges of rapid growth in technology and communications prompted the birth of United States Army Strategic Communications Command (USSTRATCOM) in Washington, D.C., in March 1964. Its role was to manage the Army's portion of military global communications. The first subordinate command USSTRATCOM formed was STRATCOM-Europe, established 1 July 1964, in Schwetzingen, West Germany.

STRATCOM-Europe absorbed 22nd and 106th Signal Groups and other communications responsibilities from USAREUR. By the end of 1965, all USAREUR communications duties, and even the position of USAREUR Deputy Chief of Staff for Communications–Electronics, had been transferred to STRATCOM-Europe. Changes in signals/military communications continued through the 1970s; 7th Signal Brigade was activated in 1970 from assets of the deactivated Seventh Army communications command. STRATCOM-Europe assumed operational control of the brigade in June 1972 and was redesignated as Army Communications Command-Europe (ACC-E) in October 1973. The 106th and 516th Signal Groups were also inactivated during this time and replaced by the 4th Signal Group.

During the summer of 1974, ACC-E reorganized as Headquarters, 5th Signal Command at Kilbourne Kaserne in Schwetzingen. The reorganization called for the activation of 2nd and 160th Signal Groups from resources of inactivated units from the 22nd and 4th Signal Groups and the assignment of the 6981st Labor Service Group and 73rd Signal Battalion to 5th Signal Command. Additionally, the Command relocated to Taukkunen Barracks, Worms, Germany, in August 1974, and the 12th Signal Group was inactivated by July 1975. 7th Signal Brigade remained under 5th Signal Command's operational control until 1981, when it was officially assigned to the Command.

In the 1980s, 5th Signal Command embarked upon wide-ranging upgrades of its strategic communications equipment in Europe. The Nazi-era Reichspost 40 Strowger switches were replaced by KN-101 electronic switching systems manufactured by Siemens. Likewise, record (message) traffic centers were upgraded with more powerful computer hardware and the Army's microwave backbone network in Europe was modernized with digital radio equipment, and in certain locations, concrete radio towers.

The collapse of communism, dismantlement of the Soviet Union, and disintegration of the Soviet Union introduced a new international world and prompted an Army-wide drawdown. This resulted in changes to military policy during the late 1980s and early 1990s. Warming superpower relations induced a period of adjustment and 5th Signal Command adjusted accordingly by: inactivating the 160th Signal Brigade and consolidating its units into the 2nd Signal Brigade; inactivating the 1st Signal Battalion of 7th Signal Brigade; and relocating the US 63rd Signal Battalion to Fort Gordon Georgia. The resulting organizational structure remains essentially intact today. The 2d Signal Brigade comprises the 39th, 43d, 52d, 69th, 102d, and 509th Signal Battalions. The 7th Signal Brigade comprised the 44th Signal Battalion and 72nd Signal Battalions until inactivation on 16 May 2014. In addition, the 22d Signal Brigade and its subordinate units were briefly assigned to 5th Signal Command prior to the brigade's inactivation on 22 May 2007.

Base closures accompanied troop drawdown. The closure of the Worms military community brought the command to its current home at Funari Barracks in Mannheim in September 1996. The closure of the Karlsruhe military community required 7th Signal Brigade and assigned units to relocate to Sullivan and Taylor Barracks, also in Mannheim. The commanding general of 5th Signal Command then became the senior mission commander for the Mannheim military community.

Since the 1990s, 5th Signal Command's subordinate units have maintained a consistently high operational tempo. During Desert Shield and Desert Storm, the Command deployed elements of 7th Signal Brigade to the Persian Gulf. The 44th and 63rd Signal Battalions deployed and attached to the 11th Signal Brigade, supporting Third Army/Army Central Command and XVIII Airborne Corps. The 1st Signal Battalion and the 268th Signal Company from the 72d Signal Battalion also deployed and were attached to VII Corps' 93rd Signal Brigade. In July 1991, the 7th Signal Brigade supported the humanitarian relief and protection efforts for the Kurds during Operation Provide Comfort.

From 1996 to 1998, 7th Signal Brigade deployed to Hungary and Bosnia, in support of Operation Joint Endeavor providing humanitarian efforts in Bosnia and Herzegovina and Croatia. Later in 1999, elements of the Brigade deployed to Albania in support of Task Force Hawk and to Kosovo in support of Task Force Falcon. 2nd Signal Brigade provided major satellite platforms to sustain the operational base in USAREUR during each of these missions.

=== Twenty-first century ===
This section contains public-domain text taken from The History of the 5th Signal Command

Since 11 September 2001, 5th Signal Command's role as USAREUR's communication arm has become even more critical in the effort to support the Warfighter. The process to build the infostructure in Europe as part of the larger GIG continues to evolve while our nation is at war. In 2001, 5th Signal Command developed Network Operations and Security Centers in conjunction with Network Service Centers to increase command and control of the expanding network and address security challenges, as well as improving customer service. With the increasing demand for bandwidth and diversity across the USAREUR footprint, 5th Signal Command initiated an intense effort in 2003 to develop the infrastructure with fiber optic connectivity throughout Europe and to begin the elimination of the legacy microwave infrastructure.

After the September 11 terrorist attacks, the United States invasion of Afghanistan, and the 2003 invasion of Iraq, the 5th Signal Command provided deployable communications packages from 2nd Signal Brigade for fort-to-port operations to support deployment and redeployment operations throughout Europe. Efforts to improve command and control communications in USAREUR continued as the Command increases capability of the operational base across Europe to provide quality communications reachback.

The command deployed significant tactical capabilities. 7th Signal Brigade deployed in February 2003 into Turkey and later southern Iraq in support of 4th Infantry Division and the 173rd Airborne Division's invasion of northern Iraq in support of Operation Iraqi Freedom. The ability to establish satellite connectivity in support of Operation Iraqi Freedom leveraged 2nd Signal Brigade's regional bandwidth, switching capabilities, and satellite downlinks into strategic satellite tactical and commercial entry points. This reachback extended the GIG and enabled the commander on the ground to: see friendly and enemy movements; disperse forces and conduct split-based operations; reduce the operational footprint; provide in-transit visibility of supplies, personnel, and equipment; and exploit information dominance. This reachback enhances the decision making and command and control for the commander on the ground.

From January through December 2004, Headquarters, 7th Signal Brigade and 72nd Signal Battalion deployed to Kuwait and Iraq in support of Operation Iraqi Freedom 2, providing tactical communications in support of Combined Forces Land Component Commander in Doha, Kuwait. In March 2005, 7th Signal Brigade deployed Task Force Lightning, comprising elements of 44th and 509th Signal Battalions, to Afghanistan for Operation Enduring Freedom in support of the Southern European Task Force. On 4 November 2016 it was announced that 5th Signal Command would be decommissioned.

On 4 August 2017 5th Signal Command held a color casing ceremony at Lucius D. Clay Kaserne, Wiesbaden. Most of the 5th's former operations will be taken over by the 2nd Theater Signal Brigade.

== Mission Statement and Motto ==
- Mission: Build, operate, and defend network capabilities to support the full range of communication, information technology, and cyber requirements for Army, Joint and Multinational forces in the EUCOM and AFRICOM areas of responsibility.
- Motto: Dragon Warriors, Any Mission, Anywhere!

== Honors ==
=== Campaign participation credit ===
- None

=== Decorations ===
- Army Superior Unit Award for 2002–2003.

== Heraldic items ==
=== Shoulder Sleeve Insignia ===
- Description: On an orange shield with a 1/8 inch (0.32 cm) white border 2 1/4 inches (5.7 cm) in width and 3 inches (7.6 cm) in height a stylized green demi-dragon with red eye emitting two black flashes.
- Symbolism:
1. Orange and white are the colors traditionally associated with Signal units.
2. The demi-dragon alludes to the unit's area of operations in Worms, Germany.
3. Background: The insignia was authorized on 24 October 1994.

=== Distinctive unit insignia ===
- Description: A silver color metal and enamel device 1 3/16 inches (3.0 cm) in height overall consisting of five flashes converging at center on a silver disc with three concentric black circles all encircled by an orange scroll inscribed "PROFESSIONAL" at top and "COMMUNICATIONS" in base in silver letters.
- Symbolism:
1. Orange and white (silver) are the colors traditionally associated with the Signal Corps.
2. The disc with black lines alludes to the globe, the flashes forming lines of longitude, and symbolizes the far reaching scope of the unit's mission.
3. They also resemble a target, indicating accuracy and efficiency.
4. The five flashes refer to the unit's numerical designation.
- Background: The insignia was authorized on 13 April 1983.

== See also ==
- Mannheim
- Seventh United States Army
