= 1108th Signal Brigade =

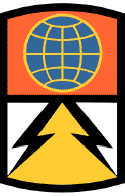
- 1108th Signal Brigade Shoulder Sleeve Insignia (SSI)
- Active: 1 April 1988 – 16 October 2003
- Country: United States
- Branch: United States Army
- Type: Signals brigade
- Size: Brigade
- Part of: 7th Signal Command
- Garrison/HQ: Fort Ritchie, Maryland
- Engagements: Gulf War; Operation Enduring Freedom; Operation Iraqi Freedom

The 1108th Signal Brigade is a United States Army unit responsible for running much of the Raven Rock Mountain Complex and providing strategic communication support to the White House and the Joint Chiefs of Staff. It was based at Fort Ritchie, but was recommended to be transferred to Fort Detrick, Maryland during the 1995 Base Realignment and Closure.

On 16 October 2003, the 1108th Signal Brigade at Fort Detrick, Maryland was re-designated the 21st Signal Brigade.
