= 7th Signal Brigade =

- 7th Signal Brigade Shoulder Sleeve Insignia
- Active: 24 February 1970 – 16 May 2014
- Country: United States
- Type: Signal brigade
- Size: Brigade
- Part of: 5th Signal Command

Insignia
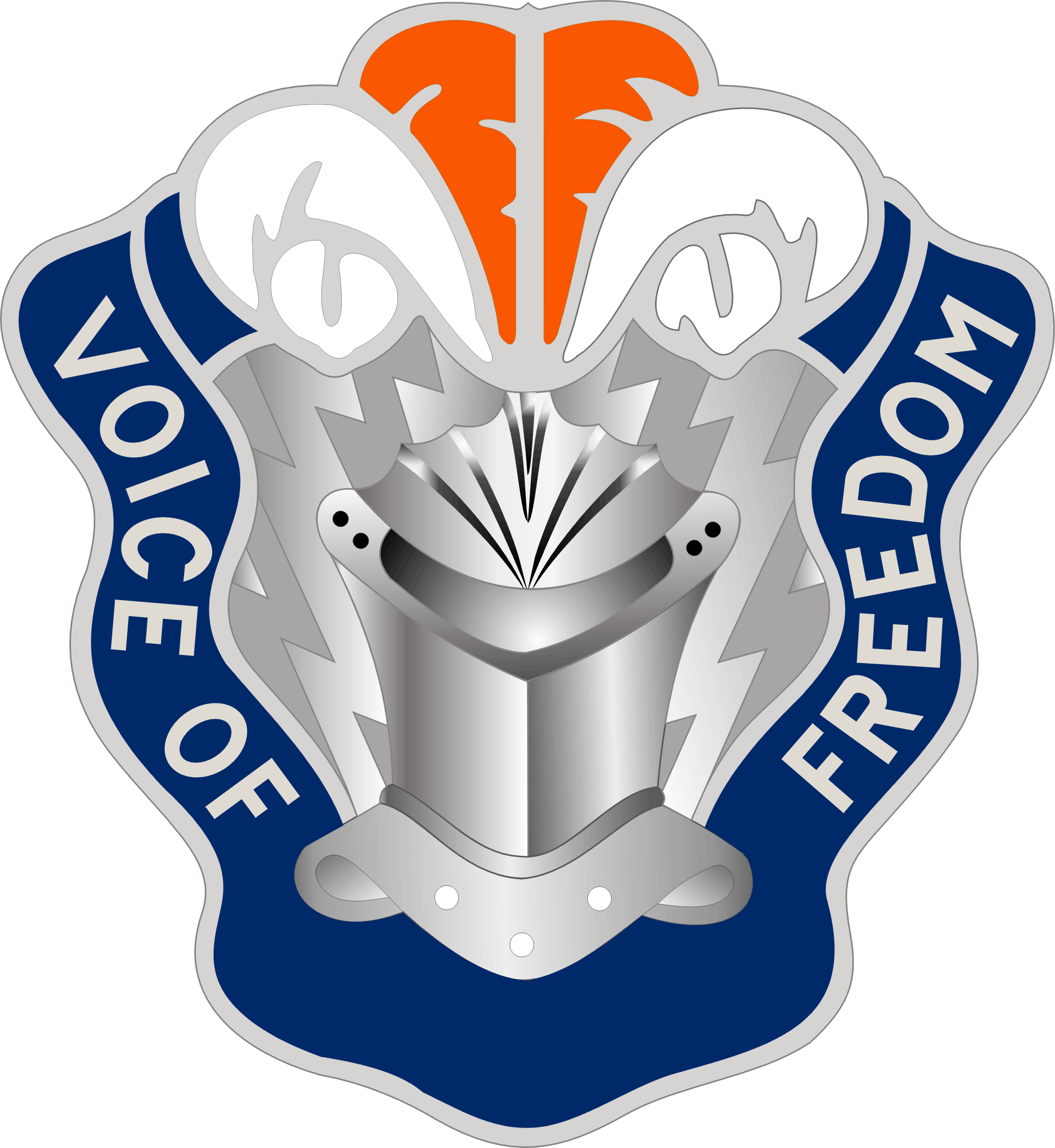
- Distinctive Unit Insignia

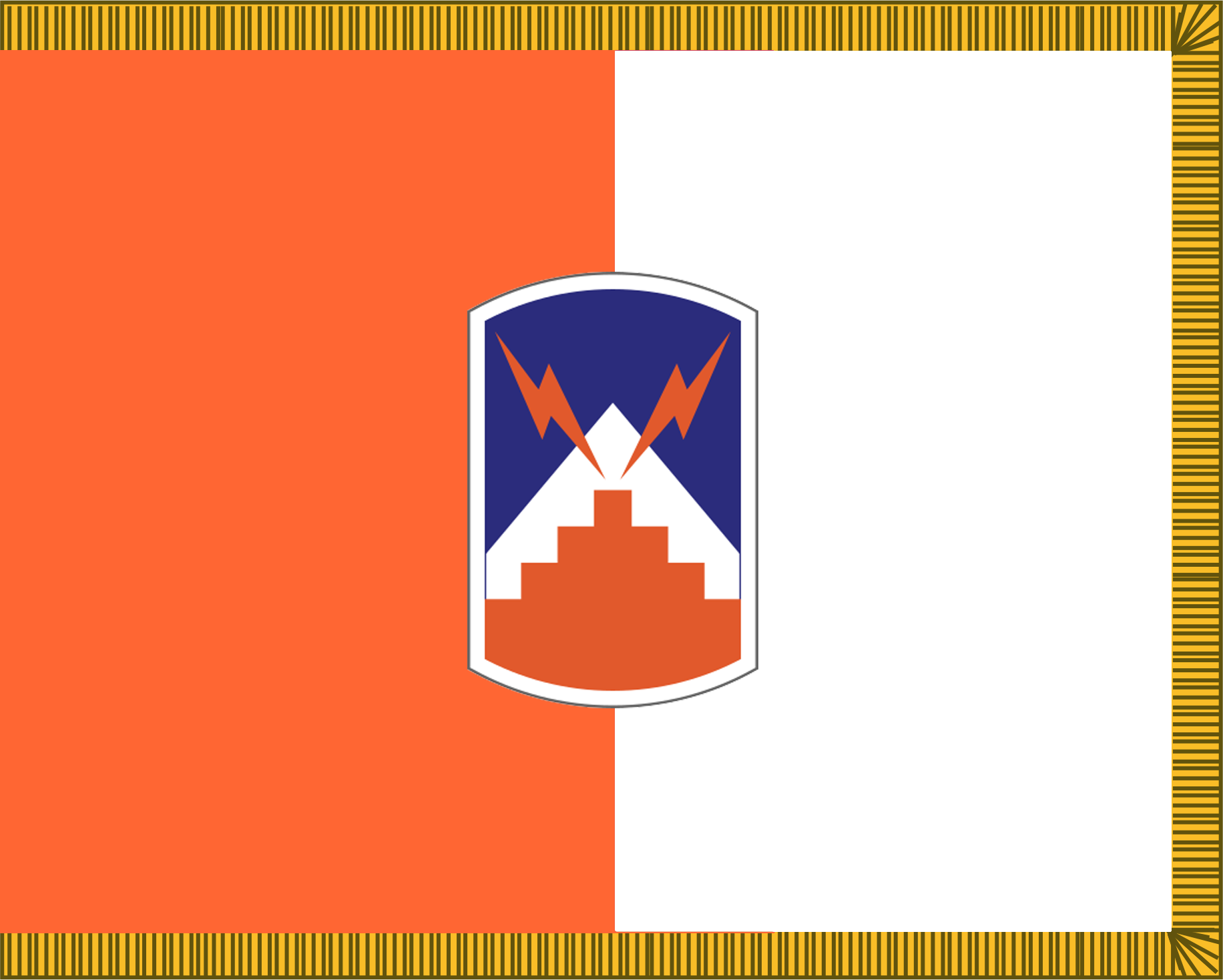
- 7th Signal Brigade Flag

The 7th Signal Brigade was a military communications brigade of the United States Army subordinate to the 5th Signal Command located in Germany.

By the end of 1965, all USAREUR communications duties, and even the position of USAREUR Deputy Chief of Staff for Communications–Electronics had been transferred to the Army Strategic Communications Command-Europe sub-command. The Signal transformation trend continued through the 1970s; 7th Signal Brigade was constituted on 15 February 1970 and activated on 24 February 1970. It was established from assets of the deactivated Seventh Army communications command. STRATCOM-Europe assumed operational control of the brigade in June 1972 and was redesignated as Army Communications Command-Europe (ACC-E) in October 1973.

During the summer of 1974, when ACC-E reorganized as Headquarters, 7th Signal Brigade remained under 5th Signal Command's operational control. In 1981, it was officially assigned to 5th Signal Command. The 7th Signal Brigade comprised the 1st Signal Battalion (Deactivated and cased colors at Kleber Kaserne on 1 April 1993), the 26th Signal Battalion, 44th Signal Battalion and the 72nd Signal Battalions.

In turn, the 44th Signal Battalion had begun its existence as the 44th Signal Construction Battalion, constituted on 3 February 1944 in the Army of the United States. Redesignated 14 April 1944 as the 44th Signal Light Construction Battalion and activated at Camp Forrest, Tennessee. Reorganized and redesignated 26 June 1944 as the 44th Signal Heavy Construction Battalion. Inactivated 6 April 1946 in Japan. Redesignated 1 August 1966 as the 44th Signal Battalion, allotted to the Regular Army, and activated in Vietnam. Inactivated 1 March 1970 in Vietnam. Activated 17 March 1972 in Vietnam. Inactivated 3 June 1972 at Oakland, California. Activated 16 March 1981 in Germany.

Since the end of the Cold War, 7th Signal Brigade maintained a consistently high operational tempo. During the Gulf War (Operations Desert Shield and Desert Storm), 5th Signal Command deployed elements of 7th Signal Brigade to the Persian Gulf.

The 268th Signal Company from the 72d Signal Battalion, a subordinate of 7th Signal Brigade also deployed and were attached to VII Corps’ 93rd Signal Brigade. In July 1991, the 7th Signal Brigade supported the humanitarian relief and protection efforts for the Kurds during Operation Provide Comfort.

From January through December 2004, Headquarters, 7th Signal Brigade and 72nd Signal Battalion deployed to Kuwait and Iraq in support of Operation Iraqi Freedom 2, providing tactical communications in support of Combined Forces Land Component Commander in Doha, Kuwait. In March 2005, 7th Signal Brigade deployed Task Force Lightning, comprising elements of 44th and 509th Signal Battalions, to Afghanistan for Operation Enduring Freedom in support of the Southern European Task Force.

On 4 November 2016 it was announced that 5th Signal Command would be decommissioned.
