= 106th Theater Signal Brigade =

Army 106th Theater Signal Brigade
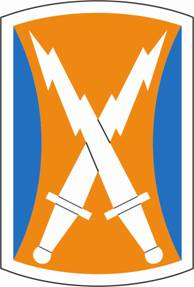
- Active: 16 July 2008–current
- Country: United States
- Branch: United States Army
- Type: Signal
- Size: Brigade
- Part of: 7th Signal Command
- Garrison/HQ: Fort Sam Houston, San Antonio, Texas

Commanders
- Current commander: Colonel Tia Benning

Insignia
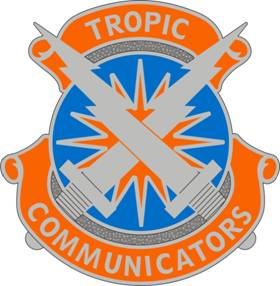
- 106th Signal Brigade DUI

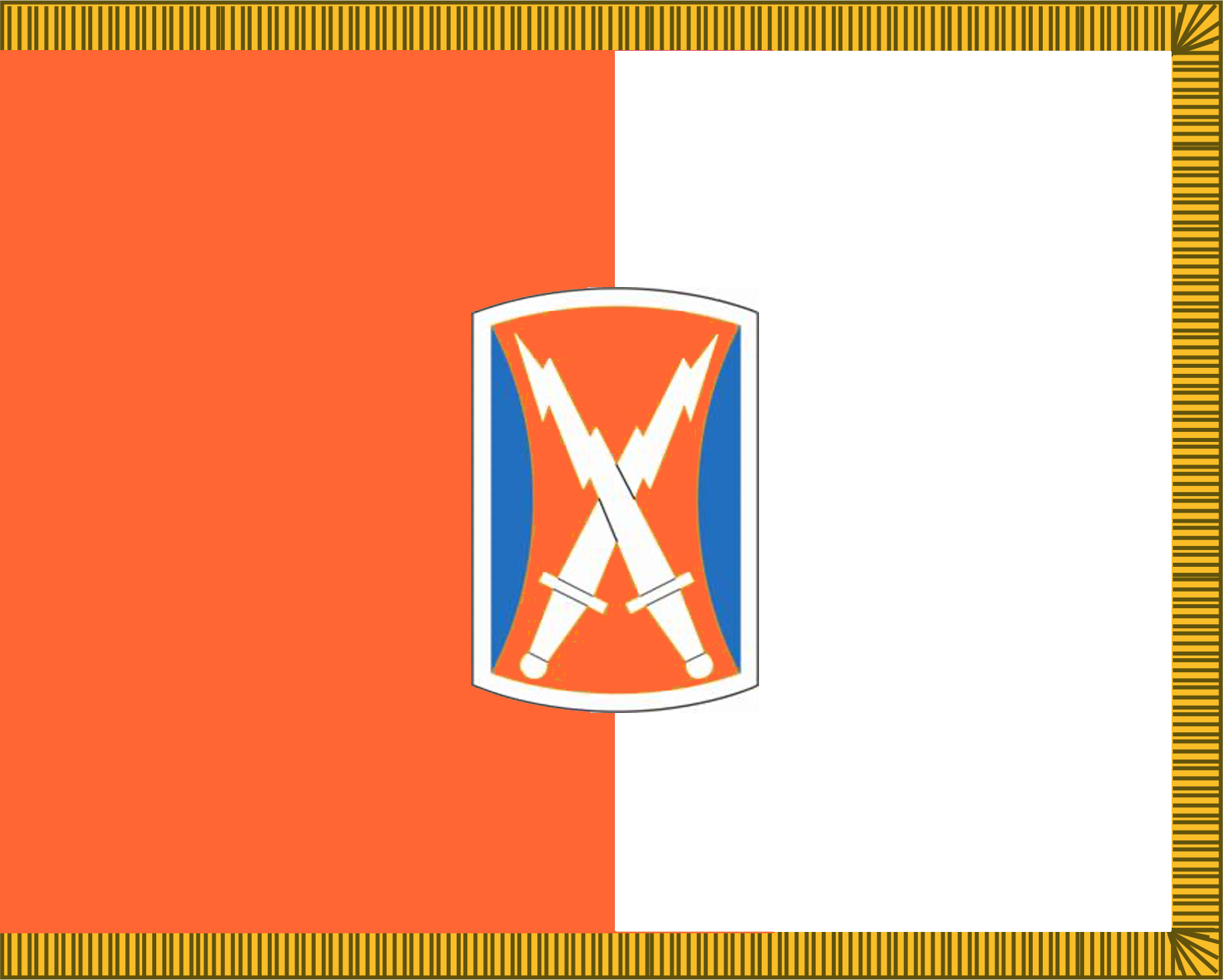
- 106th Signal Brigade Flag

The 106th Theater Signal Brigade is an Army signal command located at Fort Sam Houston in San Antonio, Texas. Its mission is to secure and defend the western portion of Army networks in the contiguous United States.

== History ==
The 106th Theater Signal Brigade traces its history back to Birmingham Army Air Base, Alabama where it was constituted as the 932rd Signal Battalion and activated on 15 February 1943. Its mission was supporting Army Air Corps operations. In April 1944 the 932rd was reorganized and re-designated as the 932rd Signal Battalion. The 932rd served in Europe during World War II. The unit returned to the United States in October 1945 and was inactivated at Camp Kilmer, New Jersey.

The 932rd was re-activated 12 August 1963 at Camp des Loges near Paris, France and re-designated as Headquarters and Headquarters Detachment, 106th Signal Group as part of US Army Europe. It was assigned to US Army Strategic Communications Command (USASCC) on 1 July 1964. The unit remained in France until March 1967 when it was relocated to Stuttgart, Germany. The 106th was inactivated in Germany in November 1967.

On 16 October 1991, the 106th was again re-activated, this time in Corozal, Panama, re-designated as the 106th Theater Signal Brigade, and assigned to US Army Information Systems Command (USAISC) providing strategic and tactical communications support to the US Army South (USARSO) and US Southern Command (SOUTHCOM). The brigade was inactivated in October 1997 as part of the provisions of the Panama Treaty of 1977.

On 16 July 2008, the 106th Theater Signal Brigade was reorganized and re-activated at Fort Sam Houston, Texas, as part of the 7th Signal Command (Theater).
