= Hilda Clayton =

United States Army photographer

Spc. Hilda Clayton
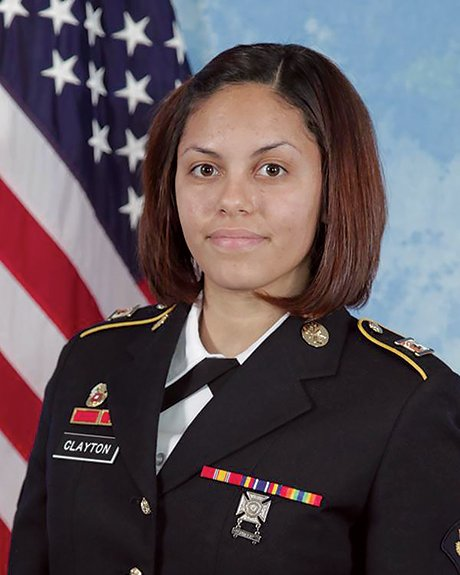
- Born: Hilda I. Ortiz-Suarez (Note: In this Spanish name, the first or paternal surname is Ortiz and the second or maternal family name is Suarez.); May 21, 1991; Augusta, Georgia, US
- Died: July 2, 2013 (aged 22); Jalalabad, Nangarhar Province, Afghanistan
- Cause of death: Explosion
- Resting place: Hillcrest Memorial Park in Augusta, Georgia
- Occupation: U.S. Army combat photographer

Spc. Hilda I. Ortiz Clayton (Note: In this Spanish name, the first or paternal surname is Ortiz and the second or maternal family name is Clayton.) (May 21, 1991 – July 2, 2013) was a U.S. Army combat photographer who was killed in 2013 when a mortar accidentally exploded during an Afghan training exercise. She captured the explosion that killed her and four Afghan soldiers. She was assigned to the 55th Signal Company (Combat Camera), 21st Signal Brigade, Fort Meade, Maryland. Ortiz Clayton was the first combat documentation and production specialist to be killed in Afghanistan.

== Early life ==
Ortiz Clayton was born on May 21, 1991, in Augusta, Georgia to Ellis Ortiz and Evelyn Suarez. She graduated in 2009 from Westside High School in Augusta. Ortiz Clayton, who was of Puerto Rican descent, was married to Specialist Chase E. Clayton, member of Charlie Company 1-30 IN 2 ABCT, 3rd Infantry in Fort Stewart, Georgia.

== Military service ==
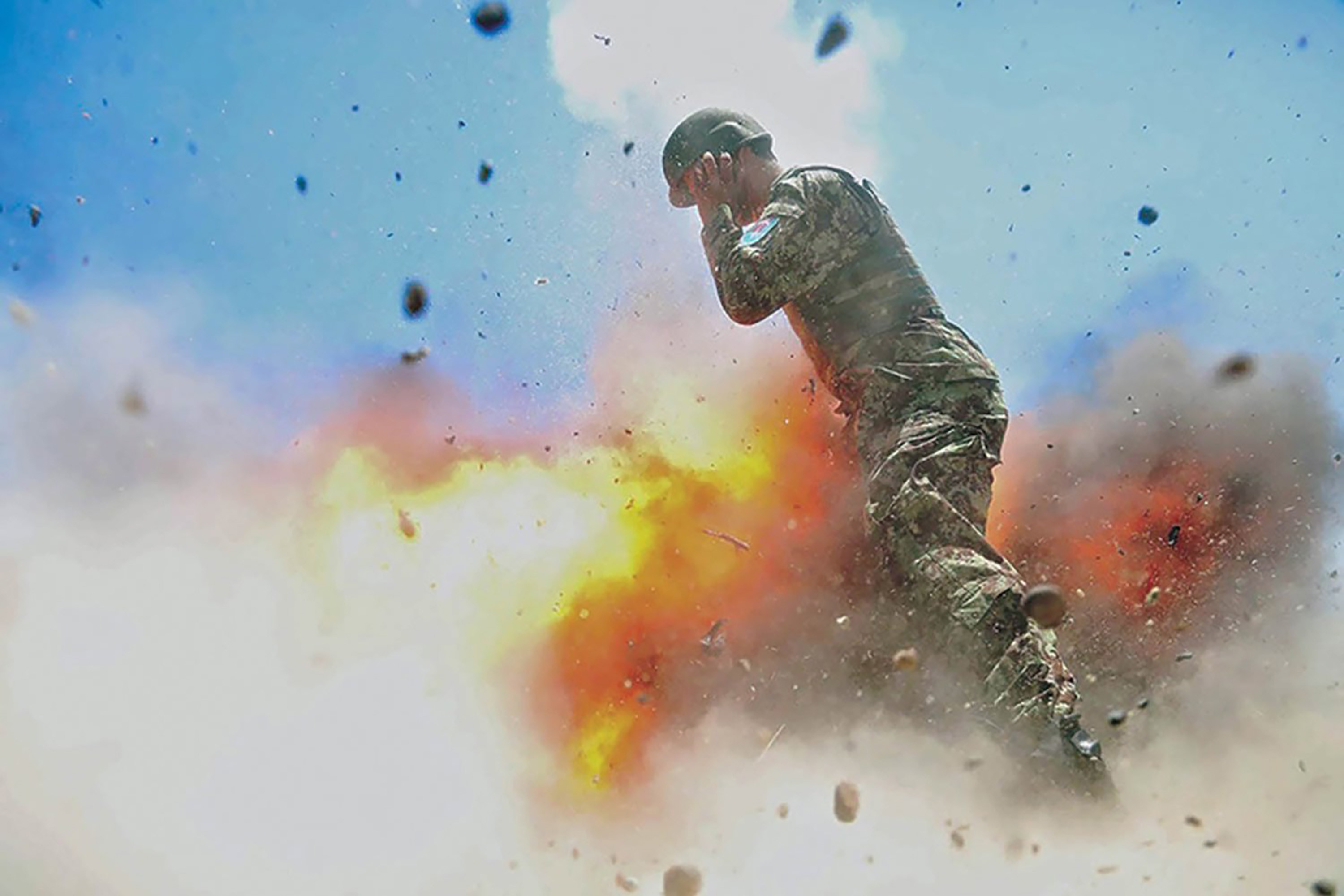
Ortiz Clayton's photo as the mortar shell exploded.

On July 2, 2013, Ortiz Clayton, who was then a visual information specialist with 55th Signal Company (Combat Camera), was photographing the training of Afghan National Army soldiers at Jalalabad, Laghman Province, Afghanistan. She was photographing the live firing of a mortar, but the mortar shell exploded while in the launch tube. Ortiz Clayton and an Afghan soldier took pictures at about the same time.

Various sources have been conflicting about who took which picture. Stars and Stripes, Military Review, CBS News and Fox News credit the above photo to Ortiz Clayton. Army Times attributes another picture to Ortiz Clayton.

Ortiz Clayton's photograph was made public in the U.S. Army's Military Review in May 2017 by permission of her family and received widespread press attention from, among others, The New York Times, Time magazine and the BBC.

== Burial ==
Ortiz Clayton's funeral was held at the Poteet Funeral Home. She was buried in the Veterans Plot section of the Hillcrest Memorial Park Cemetery in Augusta, Georgia.

- The 55th Signal Company (later redesignated as 55th Public Affairs Company (Combat Camera)) named their annual competitive award for combat camera work "The Spc. Hilda I. Clayton Best Combat Camera (COMCAM) Competition" in her honor.
- Ortiz Clayton was honored in 2017 in the May–June issue of the U.S. Army journal Military Review as part of a feature on gender equality in the Army.

== Awards decorations ==
Amongst Ortiz-Clayton's military awards and decorations are the following:

- National Defense Service Medal
- Global War on Terrorism Service ribbon
- Army Service Ribbon
- Meritorious Unit Commendation ribbon

Badge

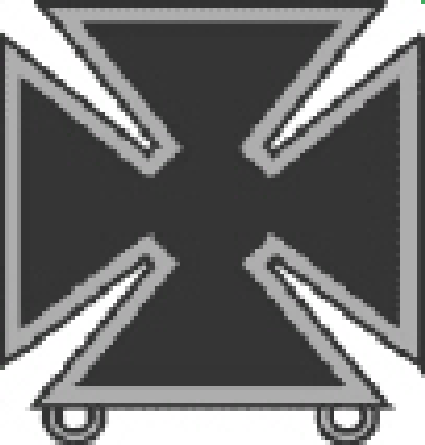
- Marksman Weapons Qualification Badge

== See also ==
- List of Puerto Ricans
- List of Puerto Rican military personnel
- Puerto Rican women in the military
- History of women in Puerto Rico
