= 21st Signal Brigade =

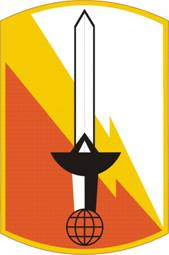
- Active: 22 June 1965 - 27 November 1971; 16 October 2003 - present
- Country: United States
- Branch: United States Army
- Type: Signal
- Size: Brigade
- Part of: 7th Signal Command (Theater)
- Garrison/HQ: Fort Detrick, Maryland
- Nickname: "Razor Sharp" (Special Designation)
- Motto: "Edge Of The Sword"
- Decorations: Army Meritorious Unit Commendation 1968 Army Superior Unit Award 2009
- Battle honours: Vietnam Counteroffensive Vietnam Counteroffensive, Phase II; Vietnam Counteroffensive, Phase III; Tet Counteroffensive; Vietnam Counteroffensive, Phase IV; Vietnam Counteroffensive, Phase V Vietnam Counteroffensive, Phase VI; Tet 69/Counteroffensive; Vietnam Summer—Fall 1969; Vietnam Winter—Spring 1970; Sanctuary Counteroffensive; Vietnam Counteroffensive, Phase VII Vietnam Consolidation I
- Website: https://home.army.mil/detrick/units-tenants/21st-signal-brigade

Commanders
- Current commander: COL Richard D. I. Becker
- Command Sergeant Major: CSM Cesar Ruiz

Insignia
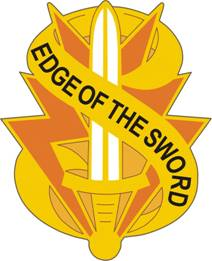
- Identification symbol

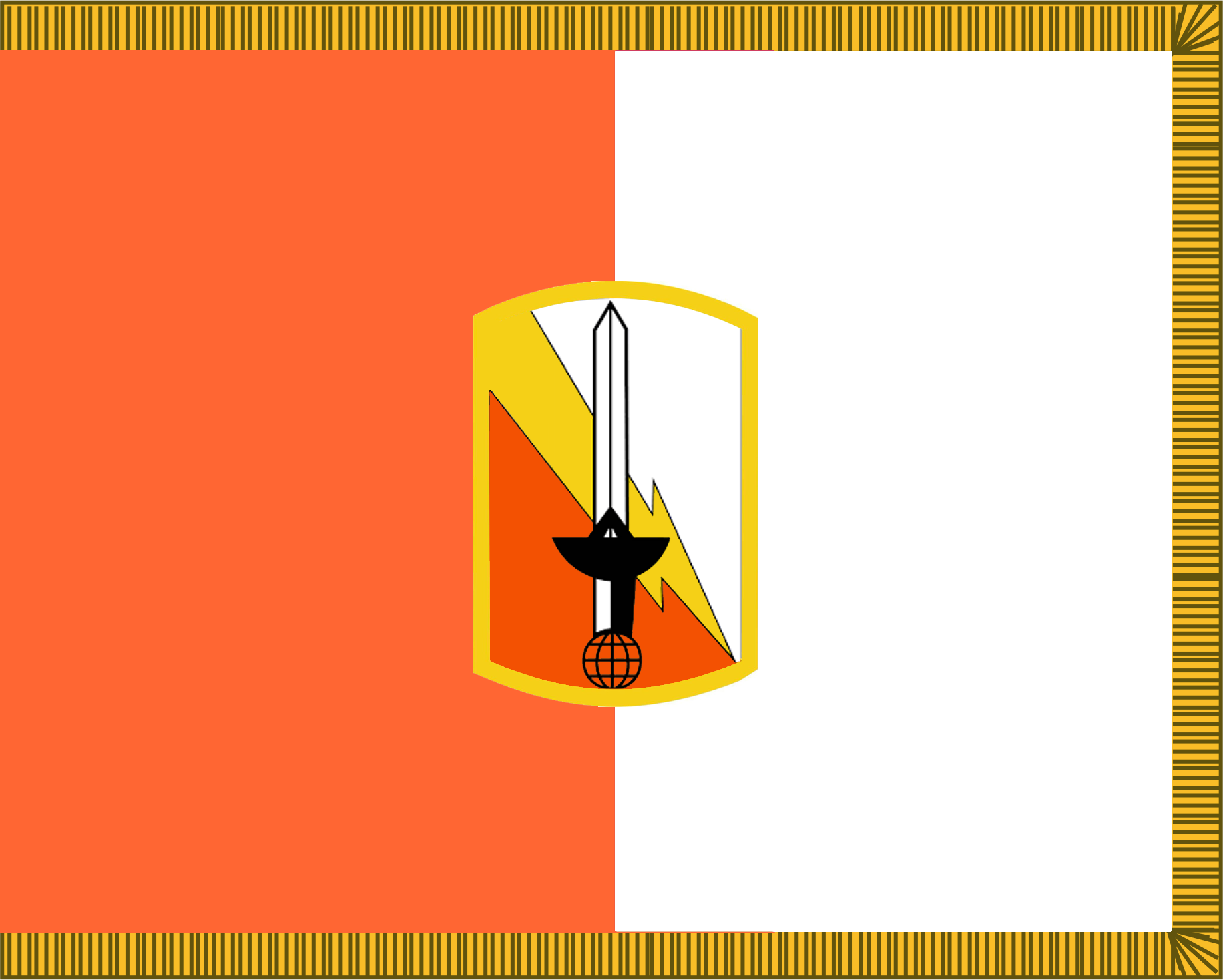
- 21st Signal Brigade Flag

The 21st Signal Brigade is a military communications brigade of the United States Army.

It was activated on September 1, 1965, at Fort Bragg, North Carolina, and was deployed to Nha Trang, Vietnam in 1966 to supply communications to I and II Corps areas as the 21st Signal Group. The Brigade participated in 13 campaigns and earned the Meritorious Unit Commendation before being deactivated on November 21, 1971.

On October 16, 2003, the 1108th Signal Brigade was reflagged as the 21st Signal Brigade at Fort Detrick, Maryland and serves there until the present day. The unit conducts theater level communications network operations. The brigade earned the Army Superior Unit Award in 2009.

Specialist Hilda Clayton was a U.S. Army combat photographer who was killed in 2013 when a mortar accidentally exploded during an Afghan training exercise. She captured the explosion that killed her and four Afghan soldiers. She was assigned to the brigade's 55th Signal Company (Combat Camera) at Fort Meade, Maryland. Ortiz Clayton was the first combat documentation and production specialist to be killed in Afghanistan.

== Units July 1969 ==
41st Signal Battalion; Qui Nhon, Vietnam
43rd Signal Battalion (Modified Support); Pleiku, Vietnam
459th Signal Battalion, Phu Bai, Vietnam
73rd Signal Battalion (Support); Don Duong, Vietnam

== Organization today ==
56th Signal Battalion, at Fort Sam Houston (TX)
114th Signal Battalion, at Raven Rock Mountain Complex (PA)
302nd Signal Battalion, at Fort Detrick (MD)

== Insignia ==
The shoulder sleeve insignia is a rounded rectangle that is diagonally divided white and orange (signal corps colors) by a gold lightning bolt. In the center is a vertical sword created from a satellite dish and a globe for a hilt. The shoulder sleeve insignia was approved effective 16 October 2003.

The distinctive unit insignia is a gold metal pin with a central upfacing sword flanked by two orange lightning bolts surrounded by an "s" shaped scroll with the motto "Edge of the Sword" in black letters. The distinctive unit insignia was originally approved for the 21st Signal Group on 19 August 1968.
