= 67th Expeditionary Signal Battalion =

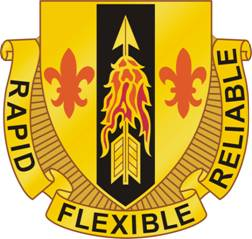
- Distinctive Unit Insignia
- Active: 1942–1946; 1967–2021
- Country: United States of America
- Branch: Regular Army
- Type: Signal
- Size: Battalion
- Part of: 35th Signal Brigade
- Motto(s): "The Lightning Force" "Voice of Combat"

Commanders
- Current commander: Kevin J. Weber
- Command Sergeant Major: Daniel P. Costello

The 67th Signal Battalion was an expeditionary signal battalion of the United States Army, part of the 35th Signal Brigade.

== History ==
The 67th's activation took place May 1, 1943 in Camp Van Dorn, Mississippi 10 days ahead of its 1st birthday. The battalion relocated to the Louisiana Maneuver Area in February 1944 to augment the 97th Infantry Division during a three-month field exercise that spring. They would subsequently receive orders for the European Theater October 26, 1944; the battalion performed communications duties East and West of the Rhine River on behalf of the 82nd, 101st, and 17th Airborne divisions as well as the 94th Infantry Division. As the Rhineland Campaign drew to a close, the battalion seemed poised to return home. However, orders moving their operations from Germany to the Philippines in August 1945 were published and they supported XIV Corps in Luzon. The battalion would remain in the Philippines until its deactivation in April 1946.

The 67th ESB was reactivated April 25, 1967 at Fort Riley where it would furnish support to ROTC cadets undergoing training there as well as to the VII Corps during REFORGER exercises and general post operations. The 67th continued in its capacity as a training outfit with the relocation of the battalion to Fort Gordon, where it remains, in December 1971. It supported the U.S. Army Signal Center until autumn of 1987 with the arrival of the newly vetted Digital Group Multiplex and TRITAC communications utilities. From January 1989 to September of the following year, the battalion would be indispensable in bringing these new technologies to major field training exercises at garrisons across the Army.

The battalion mobilized for deployment in September 1990 to Southwest Asia where it would find itself under operational control of the 11th Signal Brigade. The 67th remained a subordinate unit of that brigade for the duration of Operations Desert Shield and Desert Storm into February 1998 when it joined two other battalions under the newly reactivated 93rd Signal Brigade.

The September 11, 2001 attacks and resulting national security demands necessitated the 67th's deepened involvement in Homeland Defense Initiative missions. The battalion was called to duty January 2, 2004 in support of Operation Iraqi Freedom. With the disbandment of the 93rd, 67th folded into the 35th Signal Brigade upon the latter's relocation from Fort Bragg to Fort Gordon. Two more deployments, both principally to Iraq, would follow in October 2006 and August 2009 with each concluding in January 2008 and July 2010, respectively. The battalion again deployed in February 2013 on an eight-country tour wherein it furnished communications support across 15 locations. A 120-soldier team drawn from the 518th Tactical Installation and Networking Company deployed May 8, 2016 to join the 160th Signal Brigade providing communications support followed by the remainder of the battalion that December in support of Operations Spartan Shield, Freedom Sentinel, Resolute Support, and Inherent Resolve.

The battalion second deactivation took place in October 2021.

== Campaign Credit ==
World War II

Rhineland

Central Europe

Asiatic-Pacific Theater

Southwest Asia

Defense of Saudi Arabia

Liberation and Defense of Kuwait

War on Terrorism

Meritorious Unit Commendation (Army), Streamer embroidered SOUTHWEST ASIA 1990-1991

Meritorious Unit Commendation (Army), Streamer embroidered SOUTHWEST ASIA 2004

Meritorious Unit Commendation (Army), Streamer embroidered IRAQ 2009-2010
