= 93rd Theater Signal Brigade =

- 93rd Theater Signal Brigade shoulder sleeve insignia
- Active: 1941–1946; 1955–1972; 1981–2007; 2008–
- Country: United States
- Branch: United States Army
- Type: Signal
- Size: Brigade
- Part of: 7th Signal Command (Theater)
- Garrison/HQ: Fort Eustis, VA
- Mottos: "Loyalty, Harmony, Accuracy"
- Colors: orange, blue, white

Commanders
- Current commander: Colonel Glenroy J Haskins

Insignia
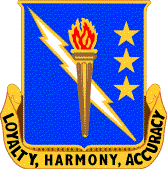
- Distinctive Unit Insignia

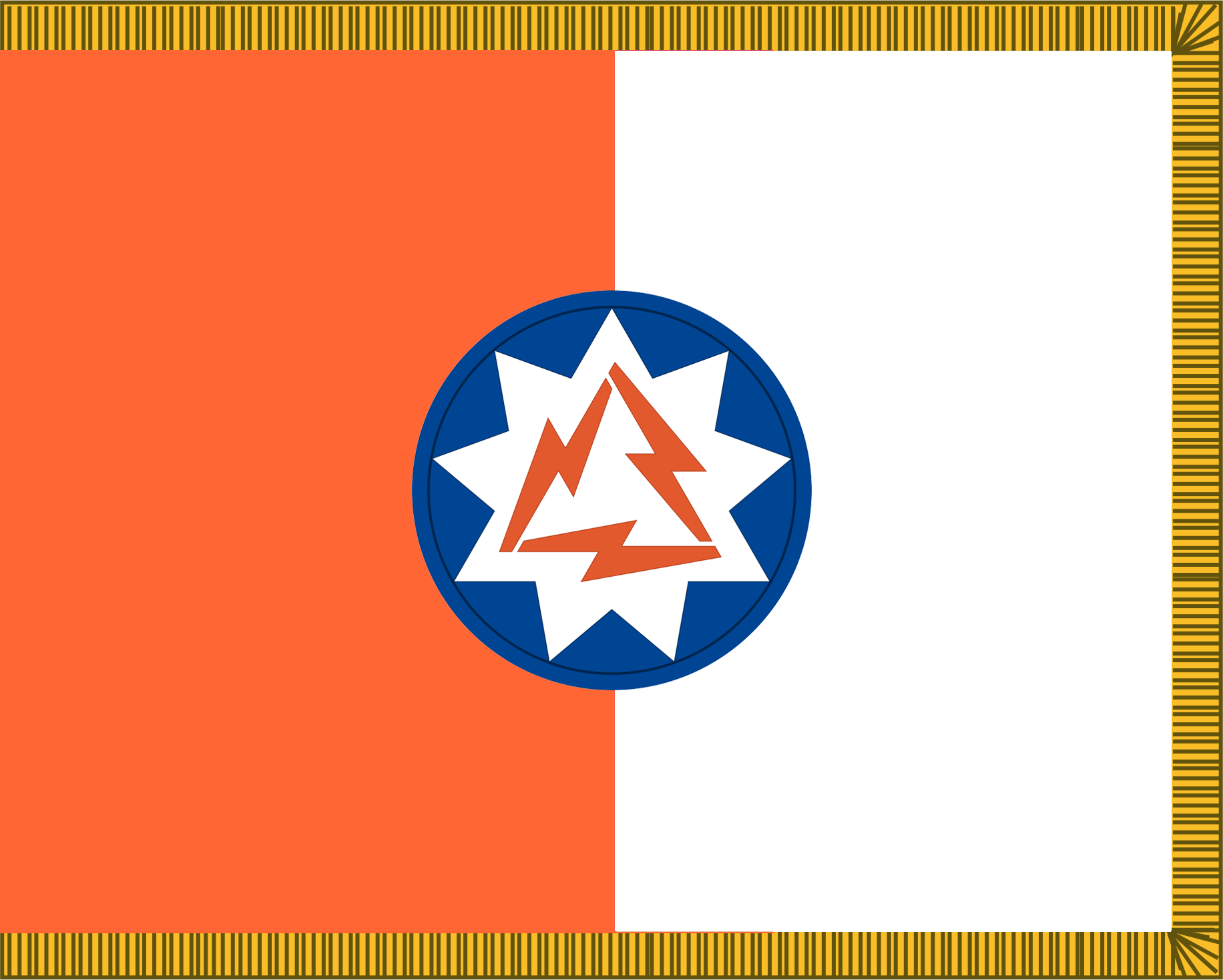
- 93rd Signal Brigade Flag.png

The 93rd Theater Signal Brigade is a unit of the United States Army which was active sporadically from 1941 to the present. Its mission has been to deploy, install, operate, and maintain a global tactical theater communications package, while supporting joint and combined operations. The 93rd Theater Signal Brigade was deactivated on 23 April 2007, and replaced by the 35th Signal Brigade. The Brigade was reactivated at Fort Eustis, Va on 16 July 2008 to support the 7th Signal Command (Theater).

== Insignia ==
=== Shoulder Sleeve Insignia Description/Blazon ===
Centered upon a blue disc 2 3/4 inches (7.0 cm) in diameter a white nine-pointed star, and centered thereon in a triangular form, three orange flashes.

Symbolism

The colors blue and white are a reference to the organization which is served by the unit. Orange and white are the colors traditionally associated with the US Army Signal Corps and the flashes refer to the signal communications mission of the organization. The outward points of the star connote signals transmitted and the inward points connote signals received. The nine points and three flashes allude to the unit's numerical designation.

=== Distinctive Unit Insignia Description/Blazon ===
A gold color metal and enamel device 1 1/8 inches (2.9 cm) in height overall consisting of a shield blazoned: Azure over a flash in bend; Argent a torch (bronze metal) Proper, inflamed of the last, in sinister three mullets palewise Or. Attached below and to the sides of the shield a gold scroll inscribed "Loyalty, Harmony, Accuracy" in red letters.

Background

The distinctive unit insignia was originally approved for the 93d Signal Battalion on 20 February 1943. It was redesignated for the 93d Signal Brigade with symbolism revised to reflect correct lineal descent and color of stars on 29 October 1980.

== Lineage ==
Constituted 3 November 1941 in the Regular Army as the 93d Signal Battalion Activated 15 May 1942 at Camp Crowder, Missouri Inactivated 3 January 1946 at Camp Patrick Henry, Virginia Activated 24 February 1955 at Fort Huachuca, Arizona Inactivated (less Company D) 21 September 1972 in Germany (Company D concurrently inactivated at Fort Hood, Texas) Headquarters and Headquarters Company, 93d Signal Battalion, redesignated 16 March 1981 as Headquarters and Headquarters Company, 93d Signal Brigade, and activated in Germany Inactivated 15 December 1991 in Germany Activated 16 February 1998 at Fort Gordon, Georgia Inactivated 16 April 2007 at Fort Gordon, Georgia Activated 16 July 2007 at Fort Eustis, Virginia

== Honors ==
Campaign Participation Credit

- World War II: Northern France; Rhineland; Ardennes-Alsace; Central Europe
- Southwest Asia: Defense of Saudi Arabia; Liberation and Defense of Kuwait; Cease-Fire

== Units ==
Units under the 93d Signal Brigade were:

- 67th Signal Battalion (Reflagged under the 35th Signal Brigade)
  - Has three line companies with switch, data, radio, and cable functionality, a headquarters company, and a Tactical Installation and Networking (TIN) company.
- 63rd Signal Battalion (Reflagged under the 35th Signal Brigade)
  - Currently deployed to Iraq, Afghanistan, Kuwait in support of Operation Iraqi Freedom
- 56th Signal Battalion (Reflagged under the 21st Signal Brigade)
  - Has three echelon-above-corps signal support companies: 235th Signal Company and the 252nd Signal Company (Full Signal Support)
- 26th Signal Battalion – Heilbronn Germany
- 51st Signal Battalion – Korwestheim-Ludwigsburg Germany
- 34th Signal Battalion – Ludwigsburg – Heilbronn

== History ==
Darmstadt 53

On July 18, 1971, soldiers of the 93rd Theater Signal Brigade were involved in racial unrest between African-American and white soldiers.

== See also ==
- U.S. Army Signal Corps
- United States Army
