= Ground Mobile Forces =

'Ground Mobile Forces (GMF) refers to the tactical satellite communications (SATCOM) component of the Tri-Service Tactical (TRI-TAC) program. Developed by GTE-Sylvania in the mid-1970s, TRI-TAC was a joint-service military command, control, and communications initiative. The program aimed to field advanced multichannel switched equipment, eliminate redundant acquisitions across military branches, and establish seamless interoperability between tactical and strategic communications systems.

== Architecture and technical specifications ==
GMF systems operate in a hub-and-spoke network topology. In this configuration, a central hub terminal can simultaneously ingest up to four primary data feeds from outlying spoke terminals.

=== Terminal classifications ===
The system utilizes four primary designated SATCOM terminals categorized by their operational role:

- Hub Terminals (AN/TSC-85B and AN/TSC-100A): Equipped for point-to-point and hub operations.
- Spoke Terminals (AN/TSC-93B and AN/TSC-94A): Designated remote terminals that connect directly back to a hub.

=== Data capacities and throughput ===
- Hub Performance: Standard hub configurations ingest up to 48 multiplexed, encrypted channels from a maximum of four spoke terminals simultaneously. Utilizing an external multiplexer doubles this capacity to 96 channels.
- Channel Configuration: Channels operate at 16 kbit/s or 32 kbit/s, translating to an effective true capacity of 48 kbit/s when accounting for protocol overhead.
- Spoke Performance: Outlying terminals support up to 24 multiplexed channels (16/32 kbit/s).

Terminal Type	Designation	Primary Role	Max Capacity (Channels)	Antenna Type
Hub	AN/TSC-85B / AN/TSC-100A	Point-to-Point / Hub	48 (96 with external mux)	20 ft (6.1 m) QRSAG dish
Spoke	AN/TSC-93B / AN/TSC-94A	Remote Spoke	24	8 ft (2.4 m) parabolic dish

=== Radio frequency and environmental protection ===
GMF terminals communicate via Super High Frequency (SHF) X-band through the Defense Satellite Communications System (DSCS) satellite constellation.

All GMF terminals feature external interfaces for field telephones, a 70 MHz Intermediate Frequency (IF) wideband input, and connection to an AN/TSQ-111 Tech Control Facility. To support sustained tactical deployments, equipment shelters are sealed for operations in Chemical, Biological, Radiological, and Nuclear (CBRN) environments.

== Obsolescence and legacy ==
While legacy TRI-TAC and GMF hardware provided foundational field communications for decades, the bulky circuit-switched equipment has largely become obsolete.

Over time, these systems were largely phased out in favor of modern, IP-based fly-away quad-band systems equipped with compact routers, switches, and advanced encryption hardware. Despite their technical obsolescence, select GMF terminals remained active in field operations under severe conditions during military engagements in Iraq and Afghanistan.

== See also ==
- Defense Satellite Communications System
- AN/TTC-39 Circuit Switch
- Tactical Communications Network
