= 7th Signal Command (Theater) =

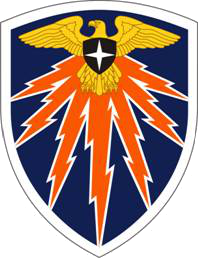
- Active: July 2008–current
- Country: United States
- Branch: United States Army
- Type: Signal command
- Part of: NETCOM
- Garrison/HQ: Fort Meade, Maryland

Commanders
- Current commander: Brigadier General Eric VanDenBosch

Insignia
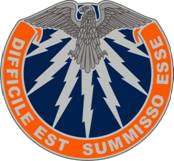
- Distinctive unit insignia

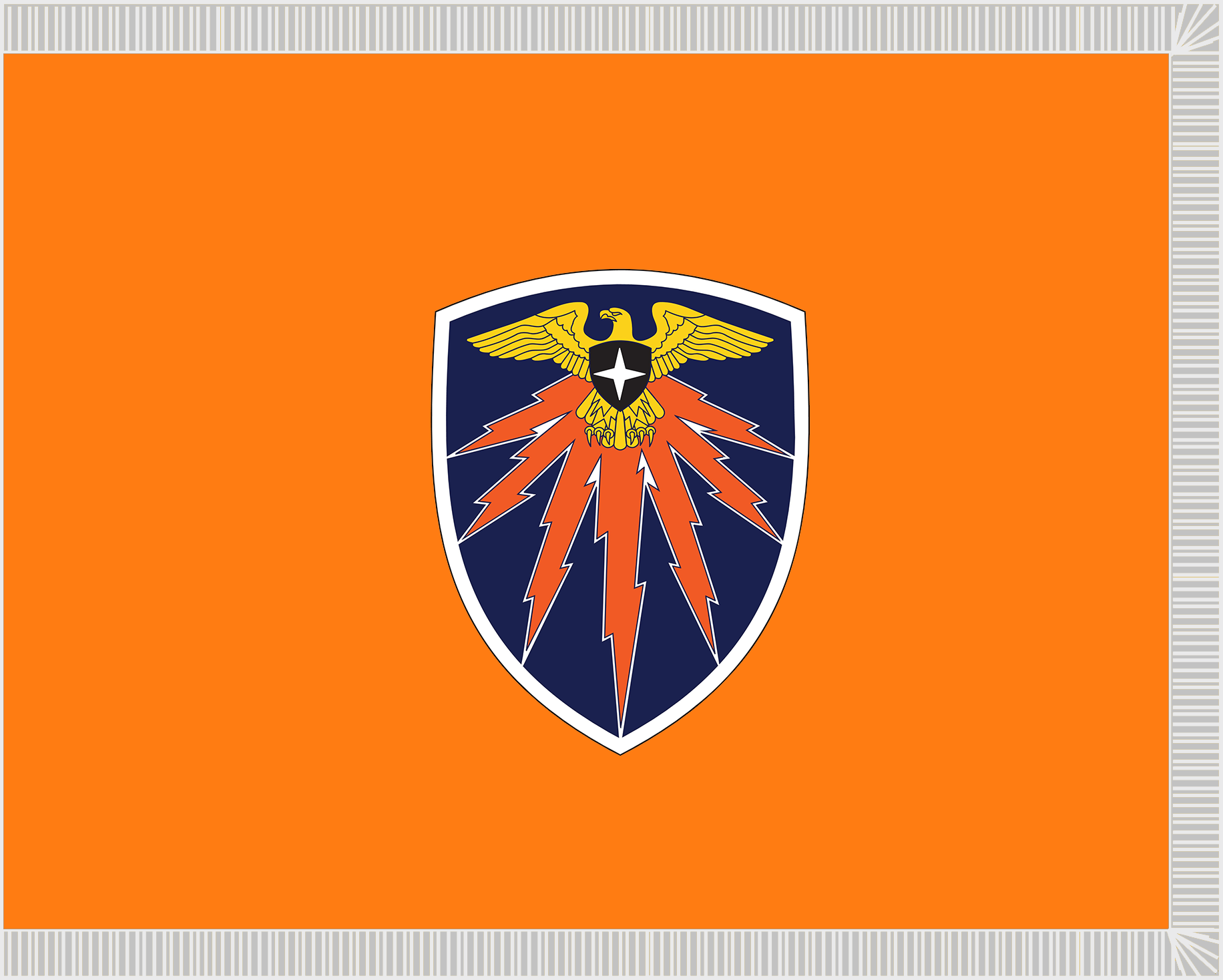
- 7th Signal Command Flag

The 7th Signal Command (Theater) (7 TSC) is a unit of the United States Army and is responsible for the integration, security and defense of Army networks in the Continental United States. The 7th Signal Command is designed to extend Army network capabilities to Army forces in support of US based expeditionary operations. The command is one of five theater Signal Commands worldwide, and is a subordinate element of NETCOM/9th SC (Army). It was activated at Fort Gordon in July 2008.

== Mission ==
Executes theater-level DODIN operations; plans and delivers continual improvements to the Unified Network to provide the CONUS digital infrastructure required by National Leaders, the Joint Force, and the Army for data-driven operations and decision making.

Install, operate, and defend Network and Mission Command capabilities for Joint, Interagency, Intergovernmental, and Multinational forces within the Western Hemisphere in support of Unified Land Operations. As directed, support other national missions or contingency operations.

== Units ==
The command structure for 7th SC (T) includes the 21st Signal Brigade in Fort Detrick Maryland, 93rd Signal Brigade in Fort Eustis, Virginia, and 106th Signal Brigade in Fort Sam Houston, Texas. The 93rd operates Network Enterprise Centers (NECs) at installations in the Eastern United States, while the 106th operates NECs in the West.
