= 3rd Signal Brigade =

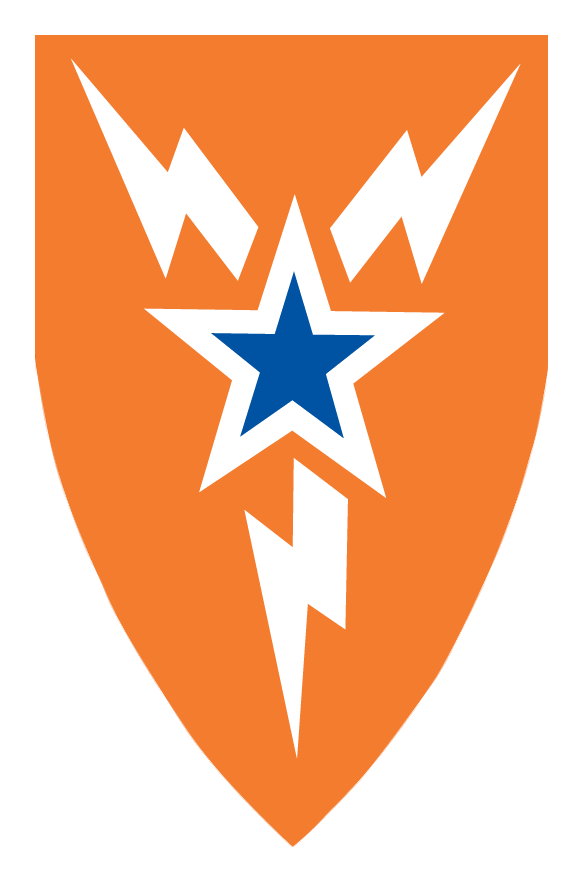
- 3rd Signal Brigade Insignia
- Active: 24. January 1946. - 15. April 2008.
- Country: United States
- Allegiance: United States Army
- Branch: Signal Corps
- Type: Communications
- Role: Command and Control Communications
- Garrison/HQ: Fort Hood, TX (former)
- Nickname: Triple Threat
- Mottos: "First in, Last out, Warriors"
- Engagements: Operation Desert Storm; Operation Iraqi Freedom

Insignia
- Distinctive Unit Insignia

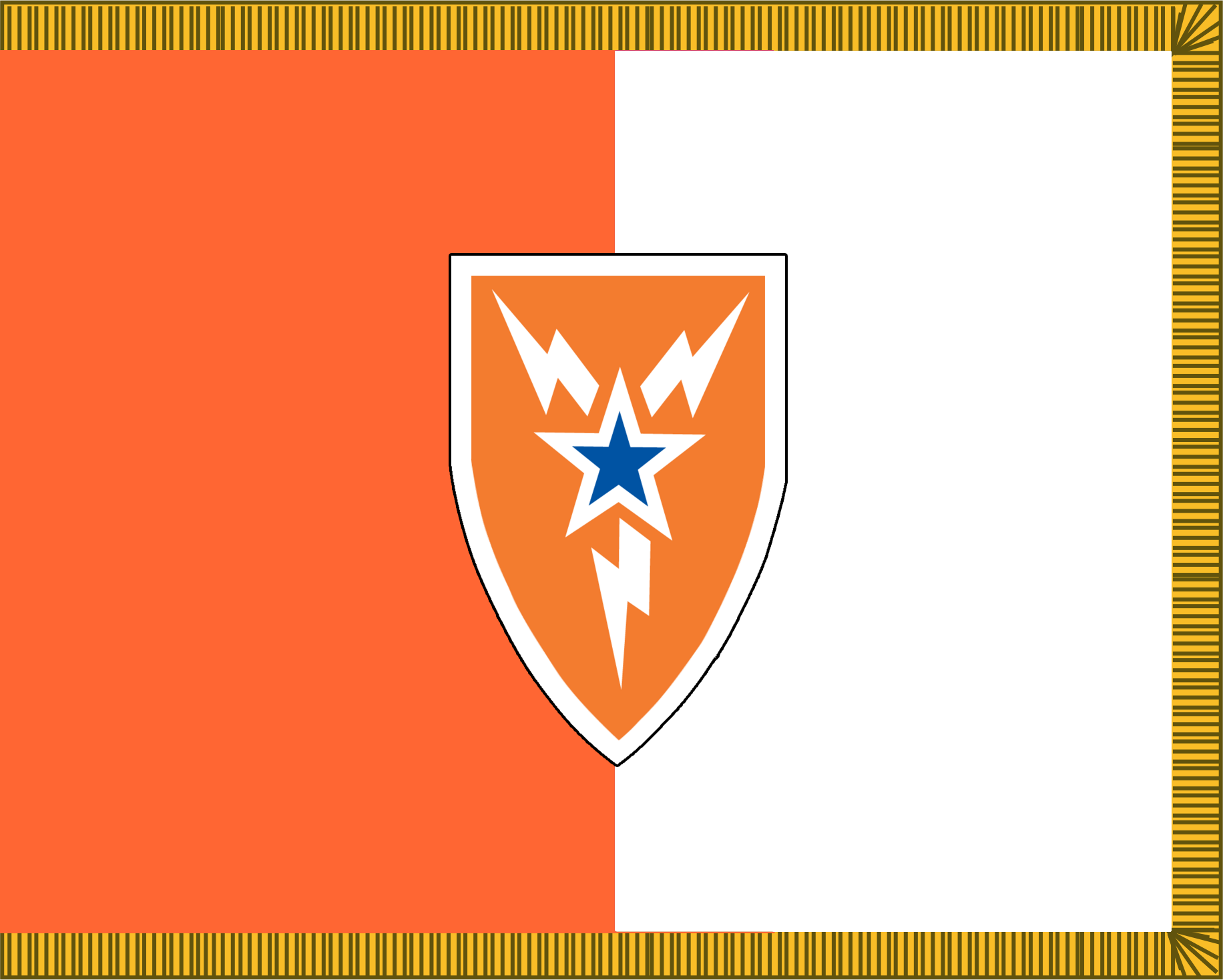
- 3rd Signal Brigade Flag

The 3rd Signal Brigade of the United States Army was an element of III Corps. It was based at Fort Hood, Texas, but was inactivated on 15 April 2008 as part of the transformation of the U.S. Army to a Modular Force Structure. The 3rd Signal Brigade has a history of inactivations and reactivations ever since formation of the unit in 1946.

The 3rd Signal Brigade was composed of the Brigade's Headquarters and Headquarters Company & the 57th Signal Battalion. On order, the 3rd Signal Brigade deployed to a theater of operations, provided command and control communications to the III Mobile Armored Corps (Phantom), and redeployed.

== Mission ==
Provide communications and automation support to III Corps (United States) and Fort Hood. The unit is tasked with:

- Installing, operating, and Maintaining (IOM) the communications network for III Armored Corps
- Being prepared to deploy in support of worldwide contingency missions
- Providing viable, effective family support to Soldiers, civilians, and their families
- Assisting in training "Reserve Component" Signal Battalions
- Supporting the Fort Hood Installation Mission Area (IMA) functions and facilities (DOIM).

== Subordinate units ==
- 176th Signal Company, 4 April 1967 to August 1968
- 596th Signal Company, 4 April 1967 to August 1968
- 57th Signal Battalion, 12 June 1978 to 15. April 2008.
- 54th Signal Battalion, 10 July 1979 to 16 April 1989 (Inactivated)
- 16th Signal Battalion, 12 June 1978 to 19 May 2006 (Inactivated)
- 313th Signal Company, 16 April 1989 to 19 May 2006 (Inactivated)
- 1114th Signal Battalion, 1 March 1994 to Unknown (No longer part of 3rd Signal Brigade) 278th Signal Company (cable) 16 March 1980 – 14 August 1987

== History ==
On 16 September 1979, the HHC, 3rd Signal Brigade was constituted. HHC, 3rd Signal Brigade commanded and controlled the 16th, 54th and 57th Signal Battalions. On 16 April 1989 the brigade inactivated the 54th Signal Battalion and began a total reconfiguration for fielding on new Mobile Subscriber Equipment (MSE) which culminated with the Commander's Acceptance Field Training Exercise in November 1989. The brigade included HHC, 3rd Signal Brigade, 16th Signal Battalion, 57th Signal Battalion, 313th Signal Company, and the 1114th Signal Battalion (Fort Hood Directorate of Information Management).

On 27 September 1990, the 57th Signal Battalion and elements of the HHC, 3rd Signal Brigade were deployed to Southwest Asia (SWA) where they were attached to the 35th Signal Brigade (Corps) (Airborne), XVIII Airborne Corps in support of Operation Desert Shield and Operation Desert Storm. In April 1991, the 57th Signal Battalion and all other 3rd Signal Brigade assets were released from attachment and returned to Fort Hood, Texas.

On 26 March 2003, 16th Signal Battalion was deployed to Iraq in support of Operation Iraqi Freedom (OIF I). A Company was detached to augment 4th Infantry Division communications support in northern Iraq, based primarily in Tikrit. HHC, B Company, C Company, and D Company with the exception of one SEN team detailed to 501st Signal Bn, 101st ABN Division based in Mosul, were attached to the 3rd Armored Cavalry Regiment to provide its communication support throughout the Al Anbar Province in western Iraq, primarily based in Ar Ramadi (a former palace of Saddam Hussein) and Al Asad Air Base (a former Iraqi Air Force base), with outposts in smaller towns, including Al Habbaniyah, Ar Rutbah, and Al Qa'im. On November 2, 2003, two soldiers from the 16th Signal Battalion, PFC Anthony D'agostino (D Co) and PFC Karina Lau (B Co), and 14 soldiers from other units were killed in action when the CH-64 Chinook helicopter they were flying was shot down by an insurgent surface-to-air missile near Fallujah, Iraq. 16th Signal Battalion redeployed home to Fort Hood in March and April 2004.

On 4 January 2004, 313th Signal Company, 57th Signal Battalion, and elements of the HHC, 3rd Signal Brigade were once again deployed to Southwest Asia (SWA) in support of Operation Iraqi Freedom II (OIF II). For the first time in its history, the entire HHC, 3rd Signal Brigade deployed overseas in support of a real world mission. On 23 December 2004, the 3rd Signal Brigade relinquished command and control of the OIF II theater communications network to the 35th Signal Brigade (Corps) (Airborne).

In January 2005, 16th Signal Battalion deployed again to Iraq in support of Operation Iraqi Freedom III (OIF III). The battalion was attached to the 11th Armored Cavalry Regiment and provided communications support in northern Iraq, primarily in Mosul from Camp Courage/Freedom (formerly Saddam Hussein's northern palace), Camp Marez, and the Mosul Airfield, but also in smaller towns, such as Tal Afar and Dahuk. The battalion redeployed back to Fort Hood in January 2006.

On 19 May 2006, the 3rd Signal Brigade inactivated its 16th Signal Battalion and 313th Signal Company, leaving the brigade with only its command and control element, its Headquarters and Headquarters Company, and the 57th Signal Battalion.

The Brigade's three forms of telecommunication: MSE, TACSAT, and TROPO, provide the III Corps Commander and his field commanders with a strong communications triad which lives up to the Brigade's motto of "TRIPLE THREAT!"

== Insignia ==
=== Shoulder Sleeve Insignia ===
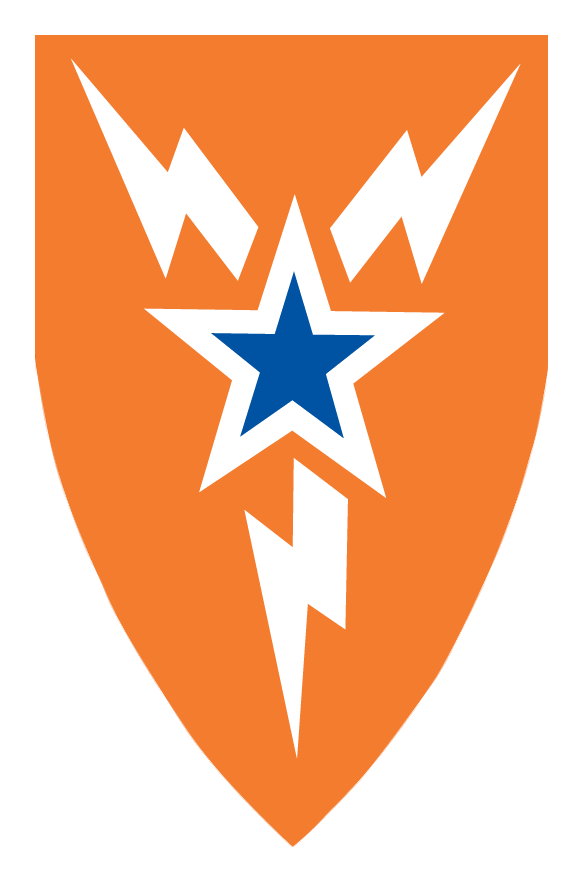

Description: On an orange shield 2 inches (51 mm) in width overall and within a 1/8 inch white border a blue star fimbriated white between three white lightning flashes.

Symbolism: Orange and white are the Signal Corps colors. The star, a reference to Texas, the "Lone Star State," the place of initial activation, also refers to guidance and achievement. The flashes are symbolic of the speed of communications and also refer numerically to the present designation of the brigade. The color blue is indicative of support to the infantry and other combat forces.

Background: The insignia was approved on 29 Aug 79.

=== Distinctive unit insignia ===

Description: A gold color metal and enamel device 1 1/8 inches in height overall consisting of three blue discs conjoined two above one and centered thereon a red triangular area with one point down bordered by three gold lightning flashes with points conjoined, and in base on a semicircular gold scroll the words "TRIPLE THREAT" in blue letters.

Symbolism: The three roundels represent rounds of ammunition and, together with the colors blue, gold and scarlet, refer to the organization's mission to support the combat arms; Infantry, Armor, and Artillery. The three flashes denote the unit's triple-threat capability in the performance of its mission, adding emphasis to the motto "TRIPLE THREAT."

Background: The insignia was approved on 17 Dec 80
