= Southern European Task Force, Africa =

Task force of the United States Army

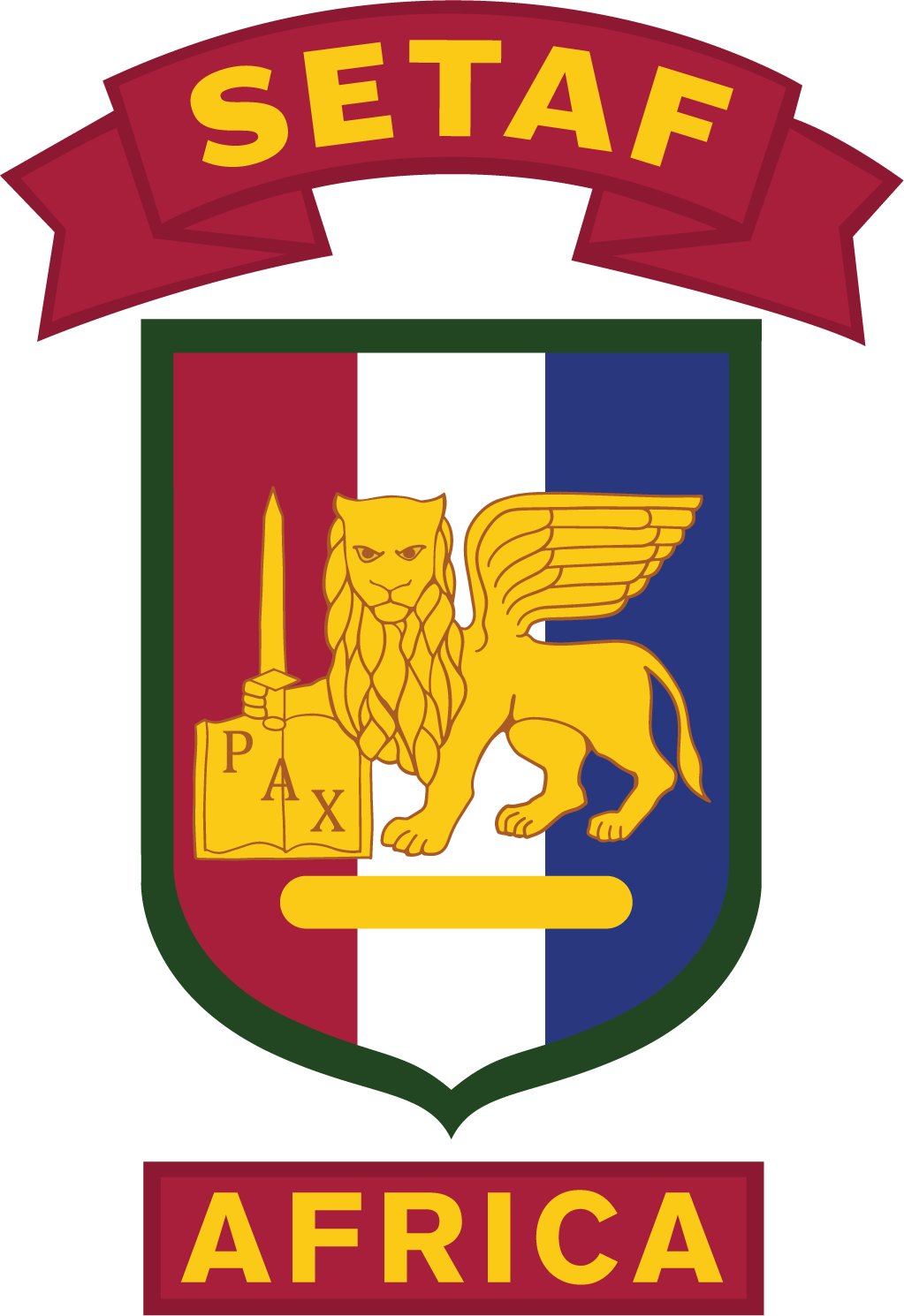
- Shoulder Sleeve Insignia
- Active: 1955–present
- Country: United States
- Branch: Army
- Role: Task force
- Part of: U.S. Army Europe and Africa
- Headquarters: Caserma Ederle, Italy
- Website: setaf-africa.army.mil

Commanders
- Commanding General: Maj. Gen. Andrew C. Gainey
- Deputy Commanding Generals: Brig. Gen. Daniel L. Cederman and Brig Gen. John A. LeBlanc
- Command Sergeant Major: Command Sgt. Maj. Chad B. Harness

Insignia
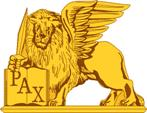
- Distinctive Unit Insignia (sinister)

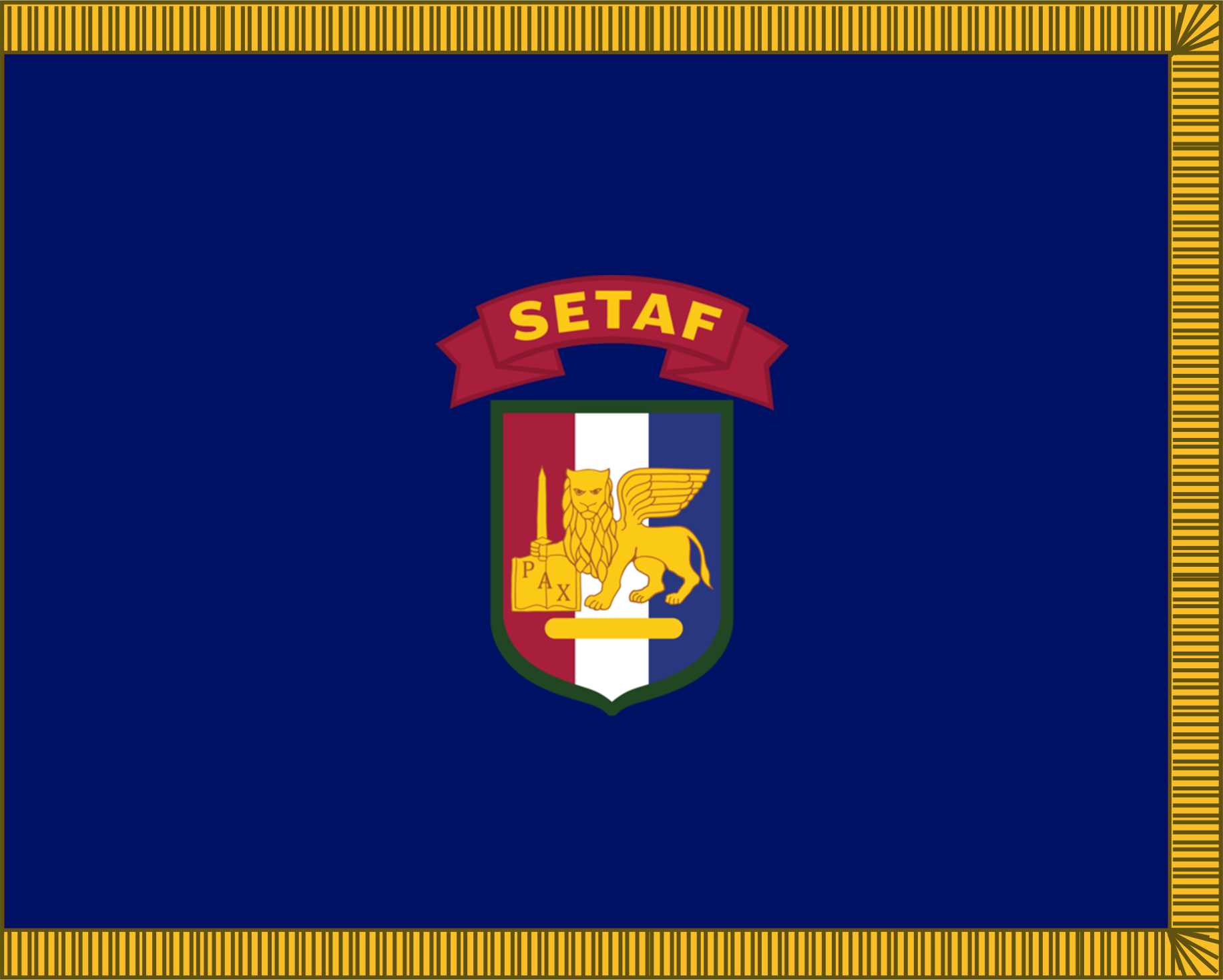
- SETAF Command Flag

The Southern European Task Force, Africa (SETAF–AF), formally the United States Army Southern European Task Force, Africa, (SETAF-AF) is a formation of the United States Army headquartered at Caserma Del Din, Italy.

== History ==
The Southern European Task Force was formally activated during a ceremony October 25, 1955. On 3 December 2008 in Rome, Italy, an official announcement by the U.S. and Italian governments stated that SETAF would become USARAF, and one week later on 9 December 2008 USARAF was established as the Army Service Component Command of AFRICOM. According to the Army Times, this marked the end of the airborne chapter of the unit's history and the beginning of its new role as the Army component of AFRICOM.

The vision for U.S. Army Africa was to be a trusted and respected partner, achieving long-term strategic effects in Africa. The command's mission statement explains that USARAF/SETAF employs Army forces as partners, builds sustainable capacity, and supports the joint force in order to disrupt transnational threats and promote regional stability in Africa.

SETAF-AF consists of the remnants of the United States Army Africa (USARAF). In 2020, the Army announced that USARAF will merge with U.S. Army Europe to form a new command, United States Army Europe and Africa (USAREUR-AF). The two commands were consolidated on November 20, 2020.

== Focus and Roles ==
The USARAF commander ensured that U.S. Army capabilities are available and prepared to protect U.S. interests, support the achievement of AFRICOM goals, and enable our African partners to provide a secure environment. To achieve this, USARAF ensured a deployable operational headquarters is validated and available to deploy; support military operations to contain and neutralize transnational threats; engage with African nations and regional organizations to build sustainable capability and capacity of African land forces; shape the AFRICOM AOR with Army forces, theater posture, and developing the land power network in Africa; and command, sustain and employ Army, joint and coalition forces as directed, including ADCON and lead service requirements.

Ultimately, when these items mentioned are met, American interests are protected and African land forces are able to address African security challenges. The means by which the DoD encourages and enables countries and organizations to work with the U.S. to achieve strategic objectives.

=== Army security cooperation ===
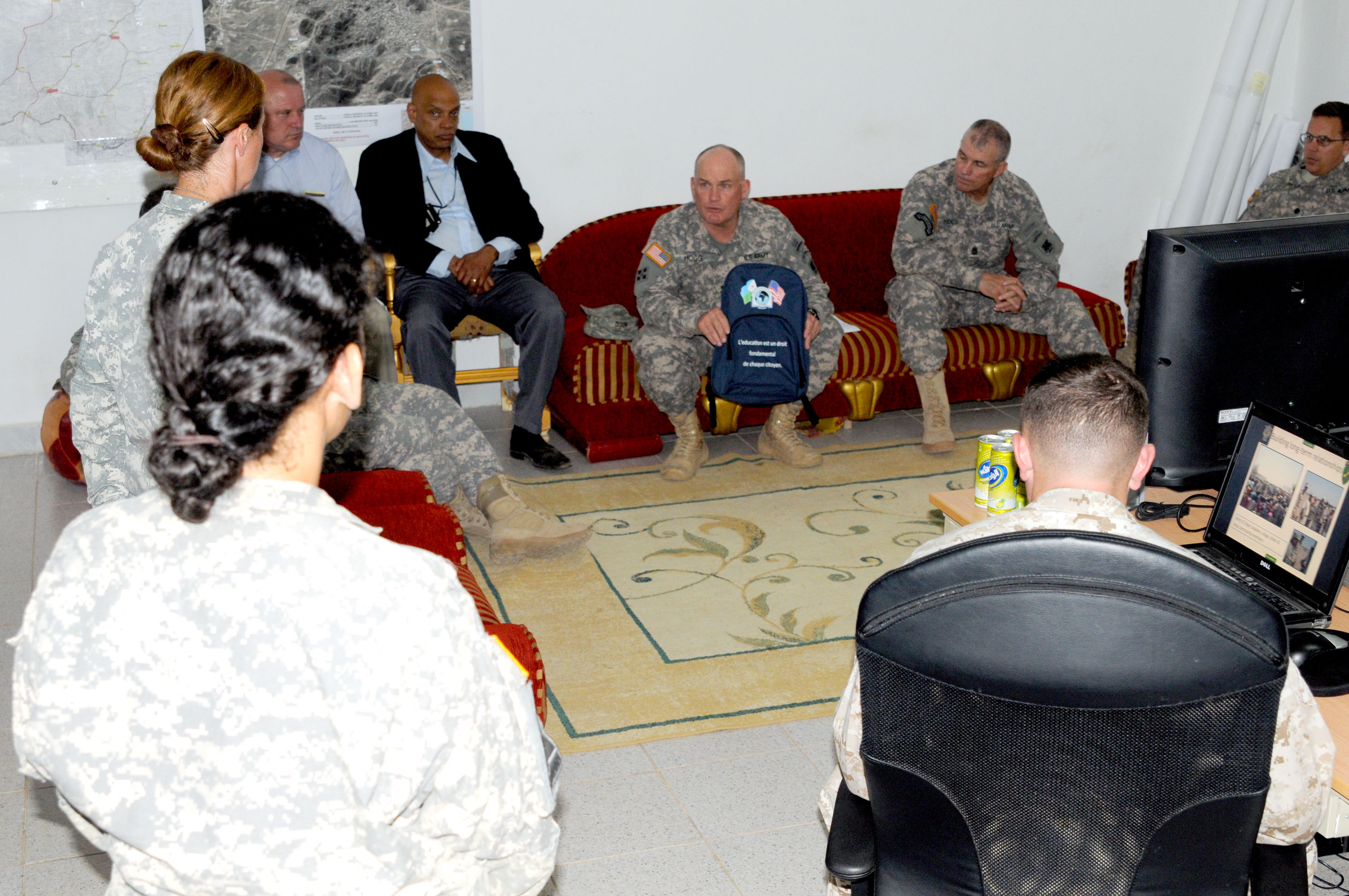
U.S. Army Africa Commander Maj. Gen. David R. Hogg gives kudos to members of the 490th Civil Affairs Battalion for coordinating the distribution of more than 5,000 backpacks for school children at 16 schools in the Ali Sabieh area

Consists of official, cooperative and generally non-combat interactions between Army elements, active duty, or U.S. National Guard and Reserve components. This includes U.S. government or non-government entities that support the Army and governments, industries, institutions, or people of other nations or official or non-governmental international organizations.

=== ACOTA: African Contingency Operations Training and Assistance ===
Department of State managed program that trains 20-30 battalions of peacekeepers throughout Africa annually. ACOTA trains and equips contingents from selected African militaries with enhanced capacity to respond quickly and effectively to peace support and humanitarian relief situations on the continent. ACOTA is a part of Global Peace Operations Initiative (GPOI).

=== Africa Deployment Assistance Partnership Training (ADAPT) ===
ADAPT is a theater logistics engagement activity that helps build deployment capacity for African partners who conduct peacekeeping, counter-terrorism, or humanitarian relief operations in Africa. Funded by the Department of State, the ADAPT program aims to enhance the projection capabilities of African militaries to support these mission requirements.

=== Train and equip ===
Provides assistance to enhance the capabilities of a foreign country's national military forces.

=== TCT: traveling contact team ===
Designed to build relationships and satisfy the Army's Title 10 responsibilities. This is typically a five-day event where the team participates with partner nation's military on different types of non-training related events.

=== FAM: familiarization ===
Military to Military event that occurs in which an African partner sends a group of military related personnel to American military activities with the purpose being to expose and familiarize the partner nation on some aspect of the U.S. Army.

=== Exercises ===
Bi-lateral and multi-lateral exercises where U.S. forces train with and alongside partner nations. Scenarios and environments vary.

=== MEDRETE: Medical Readiness Training Exercises ===
These are designed to train U.S. medical elements and specialists as well as host nation personnel. This increases interoperability and enhances relationships.

=== Security Sector Reform ===
Reform or rebuild a state's security sector. Focuses on where a dysfunctional security sector is unable to provide security to the state and its people effectively and under democratic principles.

=== HMA: Humanitarian Mine Action Program ===
Multiple week-long training program with the goal of establishing a self-sustaining indigenous HMA program in select partner nations.

=== ALFS: African Land Forces Summit ===
Engagement opportunity that brings together land forces chiefs of staff from African nations and military leadership from the U.S. Army to discuss African security challenges.

(2019) 7th Annual ALFS was in Gaborone, Botswana with more than 40 African Land Forces Chiefs in attendance.

=== Security force assistance ===
The unified action to generate, employ, and sustain local, host-nation or regional security forces in support of a legitimate authority.

=== SPP: State Partnership Program ===
This is a National Guard Bureau program. This program provides unique partnership capacity building capabilities to combatant commanders through partnerships between U.S. states and partner nations.

=== Cadet Coalition Warfighter Program (formerly CULP: Culture and Language Program) ===
This is a U.S. Army Cadet Command program. This program utilizes immersion training within a deployment to a partner nation. These are mil to mil training exercises.

== History ==
=== 2008 – present ===
In the fall of 2008, SETAF went through major organizational changes as it restructured to support AFRICOM. It was August 2008 when SETAF conducted its final airborne operation and, shortly thereafter, SETAF soldiers replaced their maroon berets with black berets and replaced their airborne tabs with historic SETAF scrolls.

In early December 2008, the U.S. Ambassador to Italy and the Italian Minister of Foreign Affairs announced in Rome that SETAF officially had assumed duties as the U.S. Army Africa, the Army component headquarters for AFRICOM.

As of March 2013, during the last 30 months, U.S. Army Africa conducted more than 400 theater security cooperation activities, exercises, and Senior Leader Engagements with each event designed to build partner capacity in Africa.

=== 2000–2008 ===
On 26 March 2003, SETAF's 173rd Airborne Brigade parachuted into Northern Iraq as part of Operation Northern Delay which involved the invasion of Iraq from the north during Operation Iraqi Freedom. The brigade remained in Iraq for a year.

On 25 July 2003, SETAF was designated to lead the U.S. military mission in Liberia to help prevent an impending humanitarian disaster. A peace agreement was implemented, forces of the warring factions were separated, air and seaports were reopened, and the UN and private humanitarian organizations resumed delivery of badly needed relief.

In February 2005, elements of SETAF were dispatched to the War in Afghanistan (2001-2021). The 173rd Airborne Brigade deployed to Afghanistan, taking over Regional Command South, as part of Combined Joint Task Force 76.

From June through November 2007, SETAF soldiers deployed to Romania and Bulgaria as a part of Joint Task Force East (now called Task Force-East). TF-East remains an ongoing United States European Command initiative to strengthen relationships between the United States and its allies in Eastern Europe.

=== 1990–2000 ===
In March 1991, SETAF's 3rd Battalion (Airborne), 325th Infantry Regiment, deployed to Northern Iraq during Operation Provide Comfort, the U.S. led humanitarian mission to feed and provide life support for thousands of displaced Kurds.

In July 1994, SETAF deployed to Entebbe, Uganda as the core staff of Joint Task Force Support Hope. A total of 2,100 U.S. military personnel, including SETAF's 3rd Battalion (Airborne), 325th Infantry Regiment, deployed to the region to help prevent a humanitarian crisis resulting from large-scale refugee movements caused by the civil war in Rwanda.

SETAF demonstrated its role as the theater's reaction force in December 1995 by deploying as the lead element of the Dayton Peace Accord implementation forces into Bosnia-Herzegovina.

April 1996 proved to be exceptionally busy: Elements of the SETAF Infantry Brigade deployed to Dubrovnik, Croatia to secure the airplane crash site of a plane carrying then U. S. Commerce Secretary Ron Brown.

Another deployment brought SETAF Soldiers to Monrovia, Liberia with special operations forces to facilitate noncombatant evacuation operations. In November 1996, portions of the SETAF-led Joint Task Force Operation Guardian Assistance deployed to Uganda and Rwanda to assess the needs of Rwandan refugees in Zaire.

In March 1997, a SETAF-led Joint Task Force (JTF) headquarters deployed to Brazzaville, Congo, in preparation for the potential evacuation of non-combatants from Zaire. The JTF redeployed in April 1997 upon a peaceful government transition in Zaire.

=== 1955–1990 ===
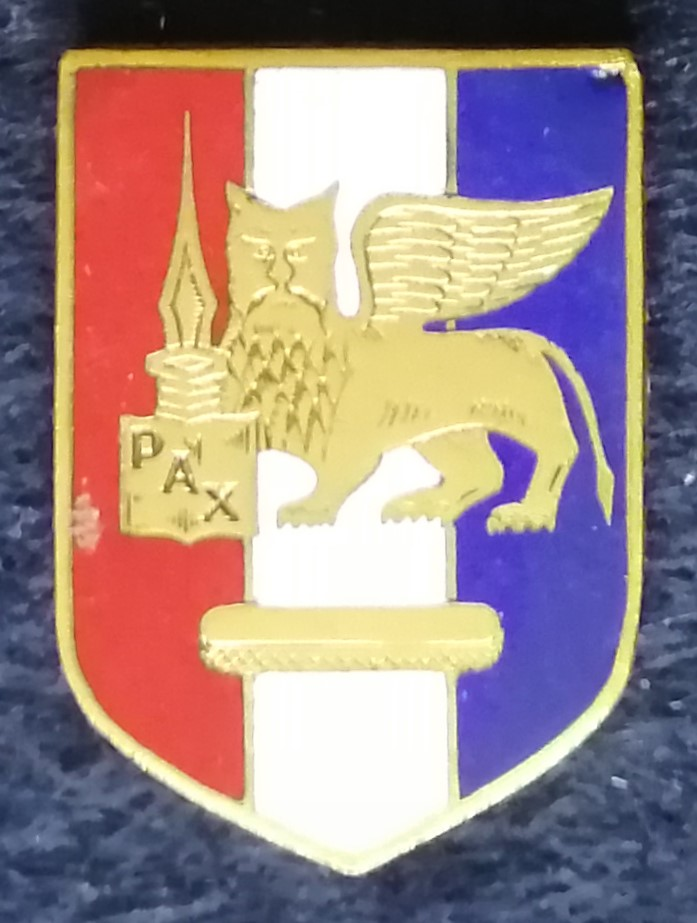
Badge of the SETAF

SETAF was formally activated during a ceremony on 25 October 1955.

The headquarters, commanded by Maj. Gen. John H. Michaelis, was temporarily established at Camp Darby, near Livorno, Italy with units additionally stationed in Vicenza and Verona. Shortly after activation, SETAF moved the headquarters to Caserma Passalacqua in Verona, Italy. The troop strength reached 10,000 and SETAF was formally established with a U.S./Italian agreement.

In 1959, a third agreement brought significant changes to SETAF, to include assigning Italian Army personnel to the SETAF general staff to assist with unique bi-national responsibilities. In 1963, SETAF lent a helping hand to its Italian neighbors when a huge landslide forced a deluge of water over the Vajont Dam in the Piave Valley killing more than 2,000 people. SETAF helicopters were the first on the scene to provide assistance.

The headquarters moved again in 1965 to Caserma Carlo Ederle in Vicenza.

SETAF's mission and geographical area of responsibility increased in 1972 when the command enlarged its signal support unit and began controlling two Army artillery groups in Greece and Turkey.

With the assignment of the 1st Battalion, 509th Infantry (Airborne Battalion Combat Team) in 1973, l which was later reflagged in 1983 as 4-325 ABCT Then in 1987, the battalion rotated assignments with 3-325 based in Fort Bragg, North Carolina. The battalion was again reflagged as 1-508 ABCT in 1996 as the 3-325 rejoined the 325th Infantry Regiment at Fort Bragg. SETAF accepted the missions of maintaining and deploying the battalion on its own or as part of the Allied Command Europe Mobile Force (Land). Throughout the 1970s and 80s, SETAF continued its tradition of helping their Italian neighbors whenever disaster struck.

Until 1992, SETAF was considered to be a logistical command, but changes in Europe resulting from the end of the Cold War also resulted in new missions for the unit. SETAF shifted focus to regional tactical operations as command and control headquarters for Army and joint units.

== Organization ==
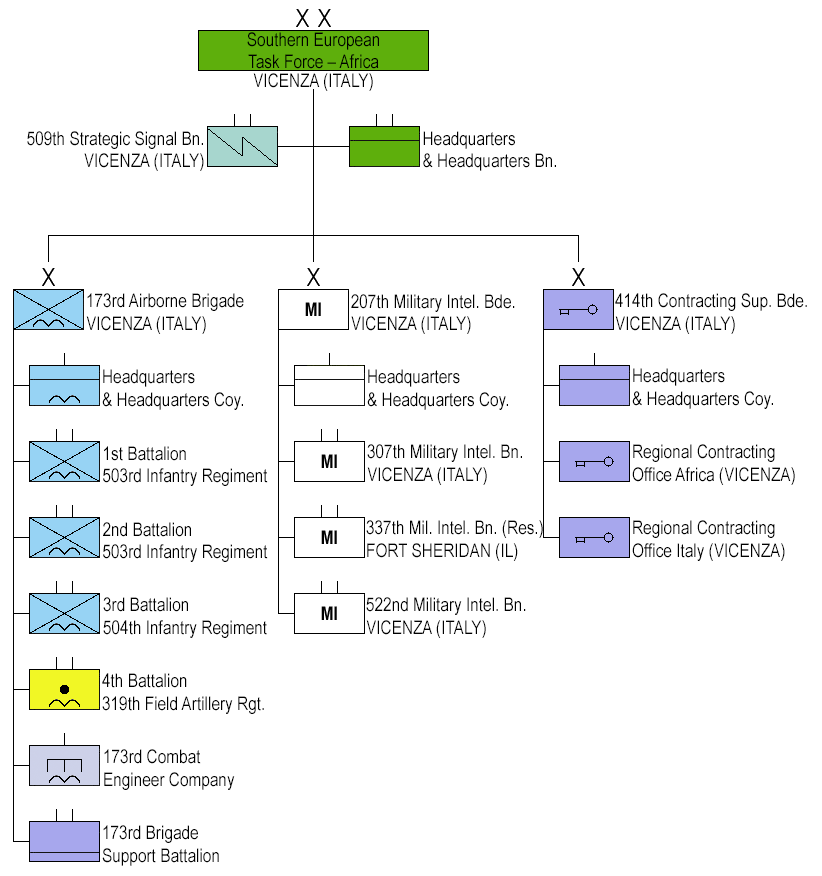
SETAF–AF organization January 2026

As of January 2026 the U.S. Army Southern European Task Force, Africa consists of the following units:

- U.S. Army Southern European Task Force, Africa, in Vicenza (Italy)
  - Headquarters and Headquarters Battalion, in Vicenza
  - 173rd Airborne Brigade, in Vicenza and Grafenwöhr (Germany)
  - 207th Military Intelligence Brigade (Theater), in Vicenza
  - 414th Contracting Support Brigade, in Vicenza
  - 509th Strategic Signal Battalion, in Vicenza
