= 2nd Theater Signal Brigade =

- 2nd Theater Signal Brigade Shoulder Sleeve Insignia
- Active: 1944–1946; 1946–1955; 1961–1971; 1974–present
- Country: United States
- Branch: United States Army
- Type: Signal
- Size: Brigade
- Part of: United States Army Europe and Africa
- Headquarters: Lucius D. Clay Kaserne, Germany
- Motto: "Brigade of Excellence"
- Colors: Orange and white
- Engagements: World War II; Vietnam
- Website: 2nd Theater Signal Brigade

Commanders
- Commander: Col. Michael R. Kaloostian

Insignia
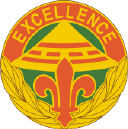
- Distinctive unit insignia

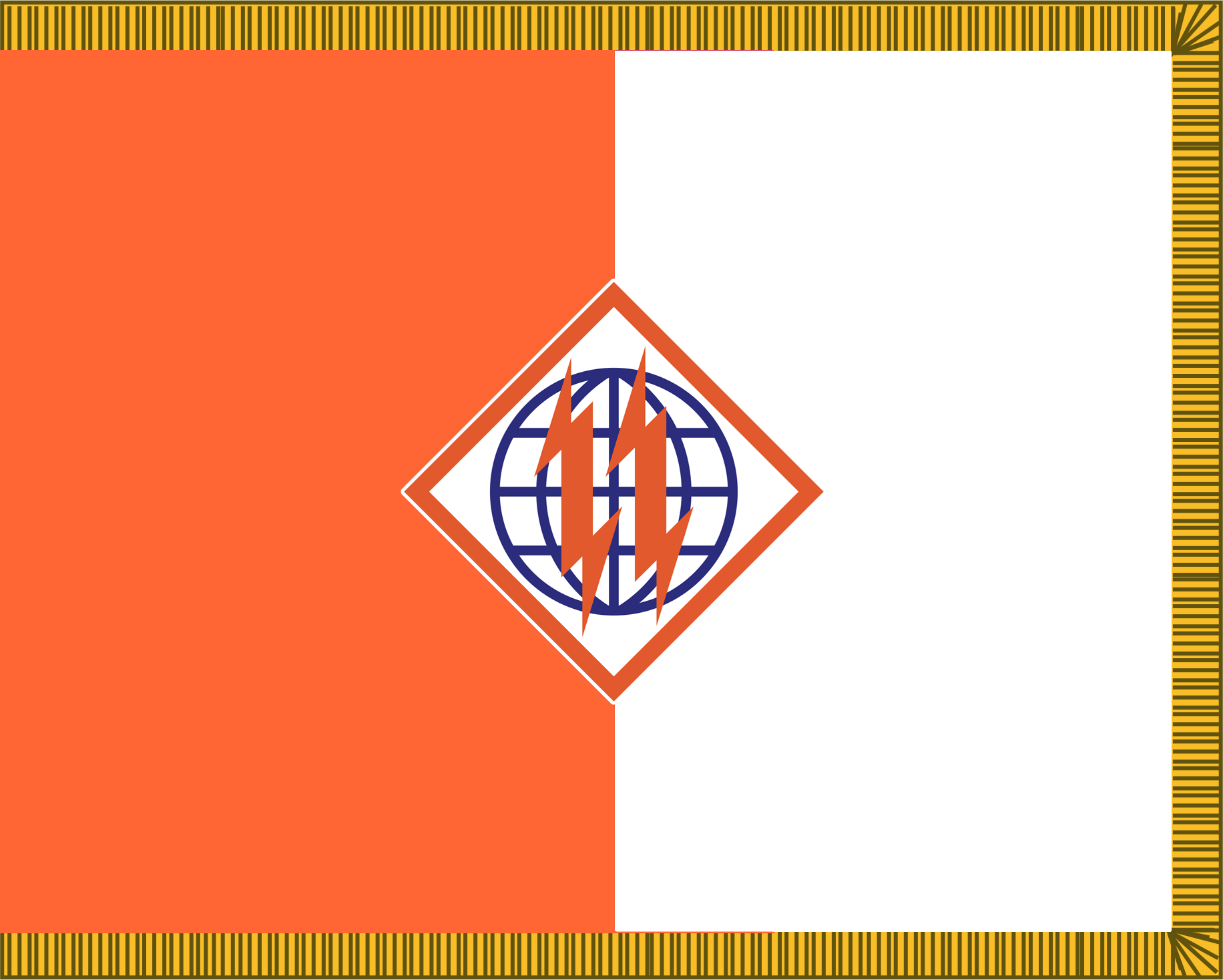
- 2nd Signal Brigade Flag.png

The 2nd Theater Signal Brigade is a military communications brigade of the United States Army subordinate to the Army Network Enterprise Technology Command with headquarters at Lucius D. Clay Kaserne, Germany.

The mission of the 2nd Theater Signal Brigade is to "deliver integrated and interoperable theater communications and cyber capabilities to enable decision dominance across all levels and phases of war in support of combat forces and mission partners in Europe and Africa."

== Units ==
As of 2025 the 2nd Theater Signal Brigade consists of the following units:

- 2nd Theater Signal Brigade, in Wiesbaden (Germany)
  - Headquarters and Headquarters Company, in Wiesbaden
  - 39th Strategic Signal Battalion (39th SSB), at Chievres Air Base (Belgium)
    - 128th Signal Company, Schinnen, Holland
    - 518th Signal Company, Linderhofe, FRG
    - 132d Signal Company, Giessen, FRG
    - 581st Signal Company, Bremerhaven, FRG
  - 44th Expeditionary Signal Battalion (44th ESB), in Baumholder
  - 52nd Strategic Signal Battalion (52nd SSB), in Stuttgart
  - 102nd Strategic Signal Battalion (102nd SSB), in Wiesbaden
    - 228th Signal Company, Frankfurt, FRG
    - 232d Signal Company, Worms, FRG
    - 261st Signal Company, Hanau, FRG
  - 509th Strategic Signal Battalion, in Vicenza
  - 6981st Civilian Support Group (6981st CSG), in Germersheim

The 509th Strategic Signal Battalion supports U.S. Army Southern European Task Force, Africa.

== Lineage ==
Constituted 24 October 1944 in the Army of the United States as Headquarters and Headquarters Detachment, 3348th Signal Service Group, and activated in France

Inactivated 13 March 1946 in France

Activated 9 May 1946 at Fort Monmouth, New Jersey

Redesignated 14 March 1947 as Headquarters and Headquarters Detachment, 2d Signal Service Group

Allotted 1 March 1949 to the Regular Army

Reorganized and redesignated 16 December 1949 as Headquarters, 2d Signal Service Group

Reorganized and redesignated 25 March 1953 as Headquarters, 2d Signal Group

Inactivated 4 April 1955 at Camp Gordon, Georgia

Redesignated 27 April 1961 as Headquarters and Headquarters Detachment, 2d Signal Group

Activated 21 June 1961 at Fort Bragg, North Carolina

Inactivated 23 October 1971 at Fort Lewis, Washington

Activated 1 June 1974 in Germany

Redesignated 1 October 1979 as Headquarters and Headquarters Company, 2d Signal Brigade

== Campaign participation credit ==
World War II: European-African-Middle Eastern Theater, Streamer without inscription

Vietnam: Defense: Counteroffensive; Counteroffensive, Phase II; Counteroffensive, Phase III; Tet Counteroffensive; Counteroffensive, Phase IV; Counteroffensive, Phase V; Counteroffensive, Phase VI; Tet 69/Counteroffensive; Summer–Fall 1969; Winter–Spring 1970; Sanctuary Counteroffensive; Counteroffensive, Phase VII; Consolidation I

== Decorations ==
- Meritorious Unit Commendation (Army) for VIETNAM 1965–1967
- Meritorious Unit Commendation (Army) for VIETNAM 1967–1968
- Army Superior Unit Award, Streamer embroidered 2004–2005
- Army Superior Unit Award, Streamer embroidered 2009–2010
