= William J. Livsey =

American general (1931–2016)

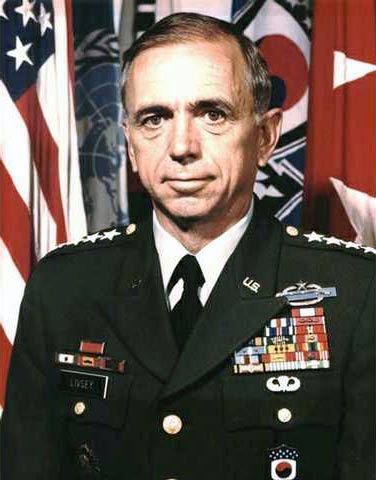
- General William J. Livsey
- Born: 8 June 1931; Clarkston, Georgia
- Died: 18 June 2016 (aged 85); Fayetteville, Georgia
- Spouse: Bena Sue Burns
- Military career
- Allegiance: United States
- Branch: United States Army
- Service years: 1952–1987
- Rank: General
- Nickname: "Lipp"
- Commands: Eighth United States Army; Third United States Army; 8th Infantry Division; United States Army Infantry School; 2nd Brigade, 4th Infantry Division; 2nd Battalion, 35th Infantry Regiment
- Conflicts: Korean War; Vietnam War
- Awards: Defense Distinguished Service Medal; Army Distinguished Service Medal (2); Silver Star; Legion of Merit (4); Distinguished Flying Cross; Bronze Star Medal

William James "Lipp" Livsey (8 June 1931 – 18 June 2016) was a United States Army general who served as the Commander in Chief of United Nations Command/Commander in Chief, ROK/U.S. Combined Forces Command/Commander, United States Forces Korea/Commanding General, Eighth United States Army from 1984 to 1987.

== Early life and education ==
Livsey was born on 8 June 1931, in Clarkston, Georgia. He is a 1952 graduate of North Georgia College. Years later, he served as a trustee for the university foundation. He received his commission as a second lieutenant of Infantry in the United States Army. He has a master's degree in psychology from Vanderbilt University. His military schooling includes the Infantry Officer Basic and Advanced Courses, the United States Army Command and General Staff College, where he graduated first in his class, the Armed Forces Staff College, and the Army War College.

== Career ==
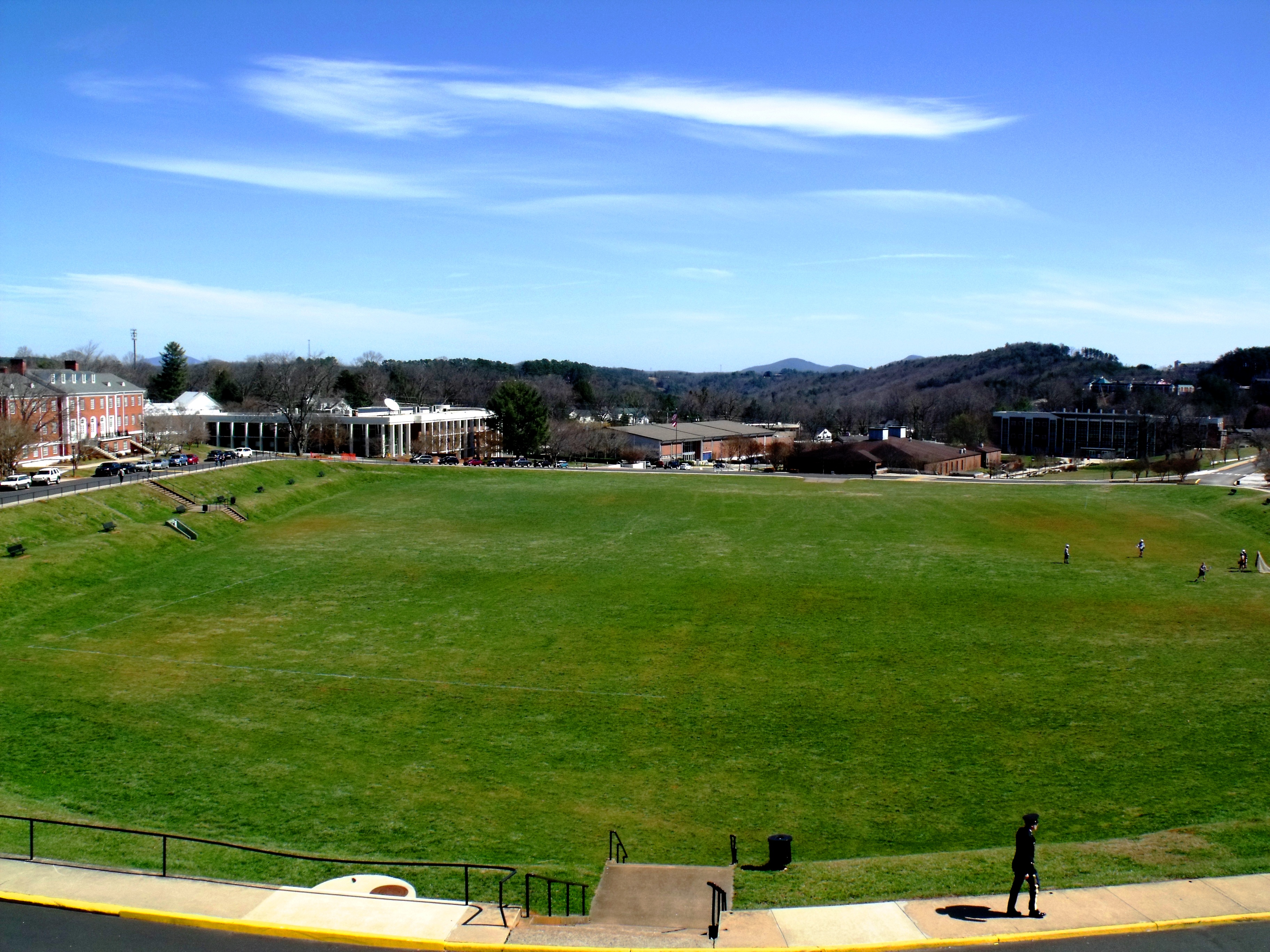
The William J. "Lipp" Livsey Drill Field at the University of North Georgia

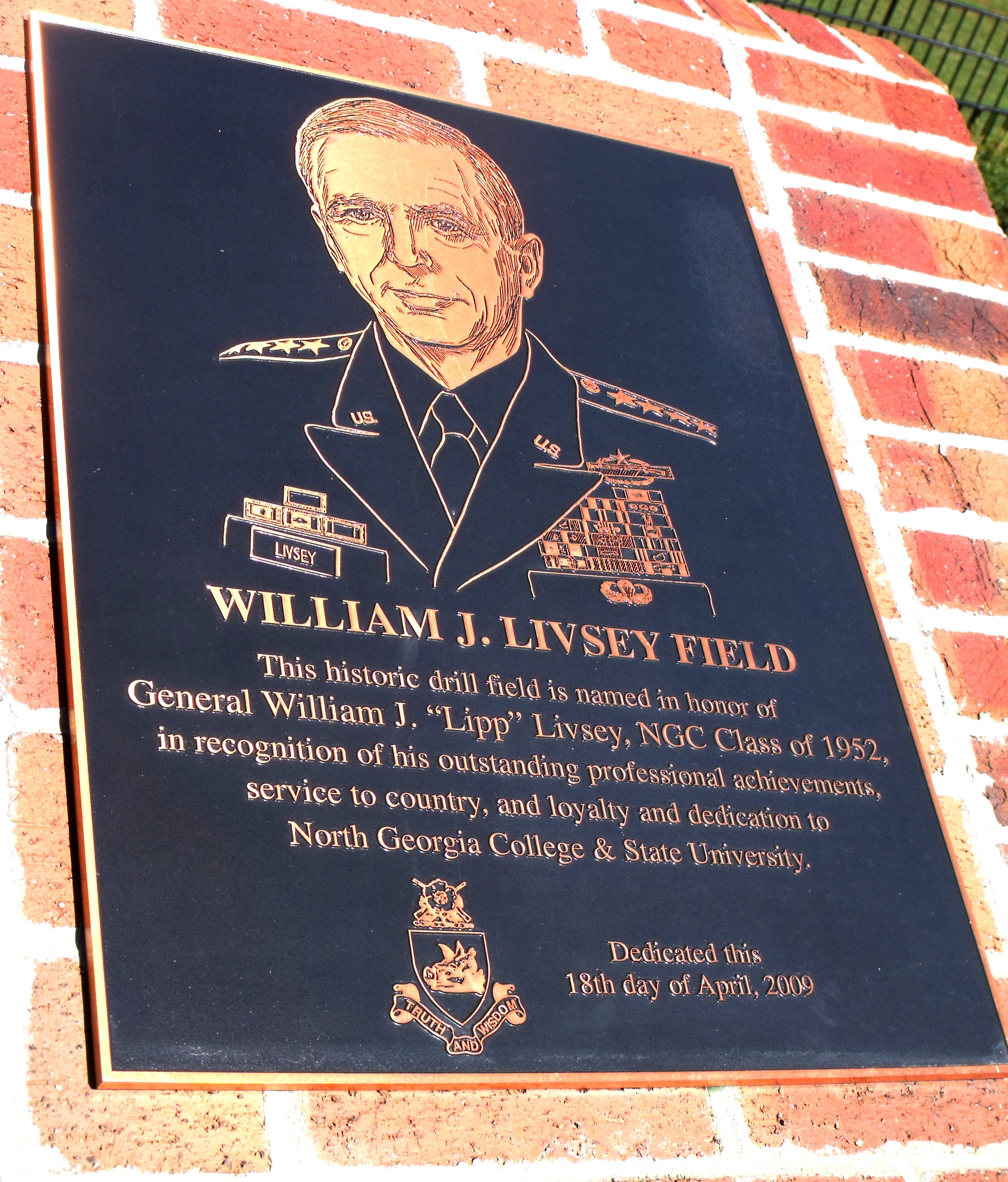
The plaque commemorating Livsey adjacent to the William J. Livsey Drill field at the University of North Georgia

In 1953, Livsey served his first combat tour as platoon leader with the 3rd Infantry Division in South Korea. He commanded his first company with the 30th Infantry at Fort Benning, Georgia in 1954. From 1958 to 1961, he served in Germany as a company commander in the 2nd Armored Rifle Battalion, 36th Infantry, 3rd Armored Division. He served his second combat tour in Vietnam from 1967 to 1968 with the 4th Infantry Division as Assistant Chief of Staff, G-3 (Operations), and as the Commander, 2nd Battalion, 35th Infantry of the 3rd Brigade Task Force.

In May 1971, Livsey took command of the 2nd Brigade 4th Infantry Division (Mechanized) at Fort Carson. He later returned to Fort Carson in 1974 to serve as the Assistant Division Commander (Support) and as the Assistant Division Commander (Maneuver) for the 4th Infantry Division until June 1976. From July 1977 to May 1979, he was the Commanding General of the Infantry Center and Commandant of the United States Army Infantry School at Fort Benning, Georgia.

In May 1979, Livsey became the Commanding General of the 8th Infantry Division (Mechanized), United States Army Europe where he served until June 1981. He then assumed the position of Commanding General, VII Corps, USAREUR, and served there until July 1983. From July 1983 until April 1984 he served as the Deputy Commanding General, United States Army Forces Command as well as Commanding General of the Third United States Army, Fort McPherson, Georgia.

Other notable assignments include, I Corps Chief of Staff in Korea, Executive to the Army Chief of Staff in Washington, D.C., and Southeast Asia, staff officer in the Office of Research and Development, and leadership instructor at West Point.

In May 1984, and until his retirement on 30 June 1987, Livsey served as Commander-in-Chief, United Nations Command/Commander-in-Chief Combined Forces Command/Commander, United States Forces, Korea/Commanding General Eighth United States Army.

== Awards and decorations ==
Livsey's awards and decorations include the Defense Distinguished Service Medal, Army Distinguished Service Medal (with oak leaf cluster), Silver Star, Legion of Merit (with 3 oak leaf cluster), Distinguished Flying Cross, Bronze Star Medal with "V" device, Air Medals, Army Commendation Medal with "V" device (with 2 oak leaf cluster), Combat Infantryman Badge (second award), Army Staff Identification Badge, and the Parachutist Badge.

== Personal life ==
In October 2008, a portion of Highway 314 in Fayetteville, Georgia was renamed as the "General Bill Livsey Highway" in Livsey's honor. Numerous active and retired military leaders, including Major General Jack Wheeler, were in attendance. Also in attendance was HeroBox, a non-profit organization that sends custom care packages to American soldiers.

On 18 April 2009, the drill field at the center of the University of North Georgia's campus was renamed the William J. "Lipp" Livsey Drill Field in Livsey's honor. A commemorative plaque bearing Livsey's likeness was added near the reviewing stand.

On 18 August 2015, Livsey was arrested for allegedly assaulting Ryan Irvin, a food delivery man for a local Chinese restaurant, and resisting arrest in Fayetteville, Georgia. Meanwhile, the restaurant wanted to drop the incident entirely. He died on 18 June 2016, at the age of 85.

Military offices
Preceded by M. Collier Ross	Commanding General of the Third United States Army; 1982–1983	Succeeded by Theodore G. Jenes Jr.
