= Ralph E. Truman =

United States Army general

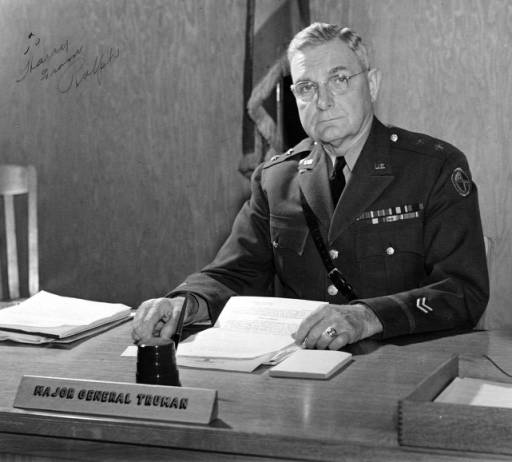
- Truman as a major general
- Born: May 10, 1880; Kansas City, Missouri
- Died: April 30, 1962 (aged 81); Kansas City, Missouri
- Burial place: Springfield National Cemetery
- Relatives: Lieutenant General Louis W. Truman (son); Harry S. Truman (cousin)
- Military career
- Allegiance: United States
- Branch: United States Army
- Service years: 1898–1944
- Rank: Major General
- Commands: 35th Division
- Conflicts: Spanish–American War; Philippine–American War; Mexican Expedition; World War I; Meuse-Argonne Campaign; World War II

Ralph Emerson Truman (May 10, 1880 – April 30, 1962) was an American major general who led the 35th Division of the Arkansas, Kansas, Missouri, and Nebraska National Guards between 1938 and 1941.

In addition to World War II, he served in the Spanish–American War as well as World War I.

== Early life ==
Ralph E. Truman was born on May 10, 1880, in Kansas City, Missouri. His mother died before he was a year old, and his father remarried and moved to Texas with Truman's two older siblings. Before the move, Truman's father arranged for his son to be taken in by a family in Kansas City, although he was never formally adopted.

== Military service ==
Truman enlisted in Company F, 20th U.S. Infantry, during the Spanish-American War on May 21, 1898, at the age of eighteen. He was wounded on March 15, 1899. He served until May 20, 1901, reaching the rank of corporal. He was commissioned as a second lieutenant in the Machine Gun Company, 3rd Missouri Infantry, of the Missouri National Guard, on June 19, 1916, serving on the Mexican border during the Pancho Villa Expedition from June 27, 1916 to February 28, 1917. On March 26, 1917, he was called into federal service as part of the Machine Gun Company, 4th Missouri Infantry, after the United States entered World War I. He served in France with the 140th Infantry Regiment of the 35th Division, being promoted to first lieutenant on January 28, 1918, to captain on July 16, 1918, and to major on March 1, 1919. He was discharged on May 28, 1919.

On May 5, 1921, Truman was commissioned a captain in the Missouri National Guard as plans and training officer on the staff of the 6th Missouri Infantry, later designated the 140th Infantry. He advanced to lieutenant colonel as executive officer of the 140th Infantry on January 24, 1924, and to colonel as chief of staff of the 35th Division on September 22, 1932.

Truman was selected as commander of the division and was commissioned a major general on October 28, 1938. In addition, he held a commission in the Officers Reserve Corps from December 10, 1921 to April 26, 1927, reaching the rank of colonel.

As part of the removal of over-age, physically unfit, or professionally unqualified officers in the U.S. Army prior to potential American involvement in World War II, Truman was relieved of his command on October 4, 1941. Rather than be assigned to an administrative position with the Second Army, General Truman chose to resign. After the U.S. entered World War II after the Attack on Pearl Harbor in December 1941, Truman withdrew his resignation, but was placed on the inactive list on January 15, 1942, pending a call back to active duty. He was retired for age from the Missouri National Guard upon his 64th birthday in May 1944, never having been re-ordered to active duty.

== Personal life ==
After World War I, Truman moved to Springfield, Missouri, serving as the chief special agent for the St. Louis-San Francisco Railway in southern Missouri. In 1928, he became an investigator on the National Board of Fire Underwriters and moved back to Kansas City. Truman's first wife was the former Nannie L. Watson, whom he married on July 4, 1903, in Texas. The couple had three children; a daughter, Henrietta, and two sons, Louis and Corbie. Nannie Truman died unexpectedly of peritonitis in July 1931 at the age of fifty. The next year, Ralph remarried to the former Olive L. Johnson. The couple did not have any children, and remained married until Ralph's death on April 30, 1962, at the age of eighty-one, from a heart attack.

Truman's oldest son, Louis W. Truman, graduated from the United States Military Academy in 1932 and served during World War II, the Korean War, and the Vietnam War, reaching the rank of lieutenant general. He led the Third United States Army from 1965 until his retirement in 1967.

Truman’s youngest son, Corbie Ralph Truman, was also a United States Military Academy alumnus, graduating in the class of 1944. Like his older brother, he served during World War II, Korea, and Vietnam, retiring as a colonel in 1971.

Ralph E. Truman was a cousin of U.S. senator, vice president, and president Harry S. Truman, who had also served in the 35th Infantry Division during World War I.

Truman’s personal papers are located at the Harry S. Truman Presidential Library and Museum in Independence, Missouri.

Military offices
Preceded by ??	Commanding General 35th Infantry Division; 1938–1941	Succeeded by William H. Simpson
