= General Ross =

General Ross may refer to:

- Alexander Ross (British Army officer) (1742–1827), British Army lieutenant general
- Arthur Edward Ross (1870–1952), Canadian physician and Brigadier-General in the Canadian Expeditionary Force
- Charles Ross (British Army officer, born 1667) (1667–1732), Scottish general of the Royal Dragoons
- Charles Ross (British Army officer, born 1864) (1864–1930), British Army major general
- Henry H. Ross (1790–1862), New York State Militia major general
- Hew Dalrymple Ross (1779–1868), British Army general
- Jimmy D. Ross (1936–2012), U.S. Army 4-star general
- John Ross (British Army officer, born 1829) (1829–1905), British Army general
- John Ross (British Army officer, died 1843) (died 1843), British Army lieutenant general
- Lawrence Sullivan Ross (1838–1898), a Confederate States Army brigadier general
- Leonard Fulton Ross (1823–1901), Union Army brigadier general
- M. Collier Ross (1927–2003), U.S. Army lieutenant general
- Ogden J. Ross (1893–1968), U.S. Army brigadier general and National Guard major general
- Richard P. Ross Jr. (1906–1990), U.S. Marine Corps brigadier general
- Robert Ross (British Army officer) (1766–1814), British Army major general
- Robert Knox Ross (1893–1951), British Army major general
- Robin Ross (Royal Marines officer) (born 1939), Royal Marines lieutenant general
- Thunderbolt Ross, fictional general in Marvel Comics
- General Ross, a fictional general in Indiana Jones media

== See also ==
- Attorney General Ross (disambiguation)
