= R. Steven Whitcomb =

United States Army general

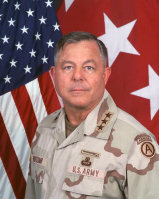
- Lieutenant General R. Steven Whitcomb
- Born: Roy Steven Whitcomb; January 31, 1948 (age 78)
- Military career
- Allegiance: United States
- Branch: United States Army
- Service years: 1970–2010
- Rank: Lieutenant General
- Commands: Third United States Army; ROK-US Combined Forces Command; 2nd Brigade, 24th Infantry Division
- Conflicts: Gulf War
- Awards: Defense Distinguished Service Medal (2); Army Distinguished Service Medal; Defense Superior Service Medal; Legion of Merit (5); Bronze Star Medal (2)

R. Steven Whitcomb (born January 31, 1948) is a retired United States Army lieutenant general. He was commissioned as a second lieutenant upon graduation from the University of Virginia in 1970. In his final assignment he served as Inspector General of the United States Army.

== Company grade assignments ==
Whitcomb served in his first assignment as a rifle and weapons platoon leader in Company C, 2d Battalion, 508th Infantry (Airborne), 82d Airborne Division. Branch transferring to Armor, Whitcomb's initial assignments included Commander, Company B, 2d and then 3rd Battalion, 64th Armor, 3rd Infantry Division. Following company command, he served as Assistant Professor of Military Science at California University of Pennsylvania.

== Field grade assignments ==
Next assigned to the Republic of Korea, Whitcomb served as S3, 524th Military Intelligence Battalion. Posted to Fort Hood, Texas he served as Deputy G2, 2d Armored Division, and then S3 and XO, 3rd Battalion, 67th Armor, as well as Aide-de-Camp to the Commanding General, III Corps and Fort Hood.

Whitcomb's next assignment was in Germany, where he commanded the 2d Battalion, 70th Armor, 1st Armored Division, deploying the battalion to combat in Desert Shield/Desert Storm. After battalion command, he served as a staff officer in the Office of the Deputy Chief of Staff for Operations and Plans, Headquarters Department of the Army.

== Colonel assignments ==
Whitcomb served as Commander, 2d Brigade, 24th Infantry Division, with elements of the brigade deploying to Somalia and Haiti. Command Sergeants Major Ben Palacios and Joseph John served with him. His follow-on was a second tour at Headquarters, Department of the Army as a director in Force Development followed by service as Executive Officer to the Vice Chief of Staff, Army.

== General officer assignments ==
After completing his tour of duty at Headquarters, Department of the Army, Whitcomb assumed the duties of Assistant Division Commander for Maneuver, 1st Cavalry Division, Fort Hood, Texas, deploying with elements of the Division to Bosnia, followed by an assignment as Deputy Commanding General, Fort Knox, Kentucky.

During his second tour of duty in the Republic of Korea, Whitcomb served as the C3/J3, United Nations Command, Combined Forces Command, United States Forces Korea, and Deputy Commanding General, Eighth United States Army. He was again reassigned to Fort Knox, Kentucky where he served as the Commander, U.S. Army Armor Center. In January 2003, he was assigned to United States Central Command, serving as the Chief of Staff, CENTCOM during OIF and OEF.

Whitcomb assumed command of Third Army, US Army Central, (CFLCC) Forward Camp Arifjan, Kuwait on October 13, 2004 and ended this tour December 18, 2007.

Whitcomb became the 63rd Inspector General of the Army on February 14, 2008. He retired on August 13, 2010.

== Education ==
Whitcomb's education includes the Infantry Officer Basic Course, Counter Intelligence Officer Course, the Armor Advance Course, Command and General Staff College, and the U.S. Army War College. His civilian education includes a Bachelor of Arts Degree in History from the University of Virginia and a master's degree in education from California University of Pennsylvania.

== Dates of rank ==
Insignia	Rank	Date
	Second Lieutenant	29 November 70
	First Lieutenant	29 November 71
	Captain	29 November 74
	Major	1 June 82
	Lieutenant Colonel	1 October 88
	Colonel	1 September 93
	Brigadier General	1 September 97
	Major General	1 October 00
	Lieutenant General	13 October 04

== Decorations ==
Whitcomb has been awarded the following military decorations:

- Defense Distinguished Service Medal with oak leaf cluster
- Army Distinguished Service Medal with oak leaf cluster
- Defense Superior Service Medal
- Legion of Merit with four oak leaf clusters
- Bronze Star Medal with Valor device and oak leaf cluster
- Meritorious Service Medal with three oak leaf clusters
- Joint Service Commendation Medal

== See also ==
- Arlington National Cemetery mismanagement controversy

Military offices
Preceded by David D. McKiernan	Commanding General of the Third United States Army; 2004–2007	Succeeded by James J. Lovelace
