= John L. Throckmorton =

United States Army general (1913–1986)

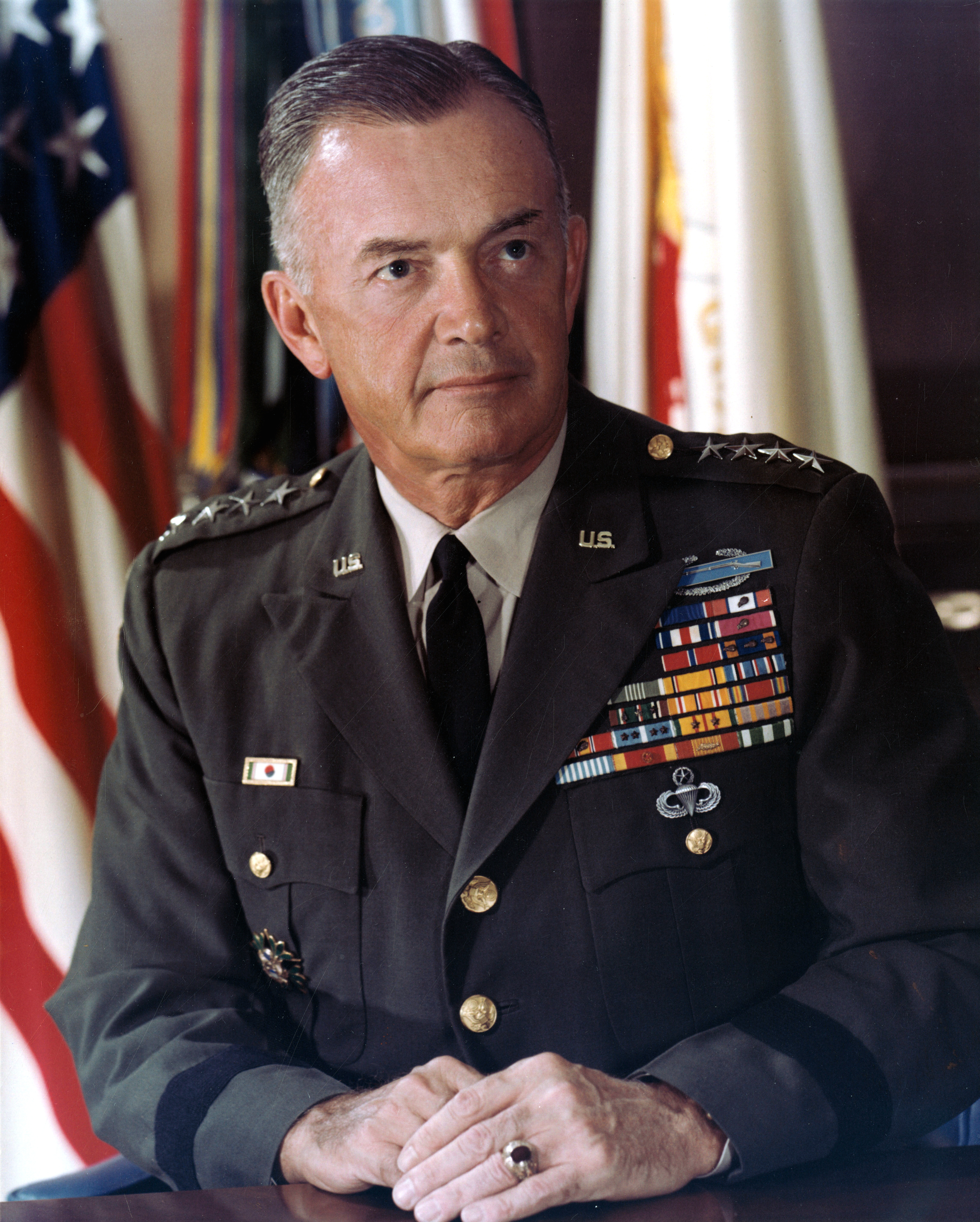
- Throckmorton in c. 1971
- Born: 28 February 1913; Kansas City, Missouri, US
- Died: 13 February 1986 (aged 72); Washington, D.C., US
- Burial place: Arlington National Cemetery
- Military career
- Allegiance: United States
- Branch: United States Army
- Service years: 1935–1973
- Rank: General
- Commands: United States Strike Command; Third United States Army; XVIII Airborne Corps; 82nd Airborne Division; 5th Infantry Regiment
- Conflicts: World War II; Korean War; Vietnam War
- Awards: Distinguished Service Cross; Army Distinguished Service Medal (3); Silver Star; Legion of Merit (2); Bronze Star Medal

John Lathrop Throckmorton (28 February 1913 – 13 February 1986) was a general in the United States Army

== Early life ==
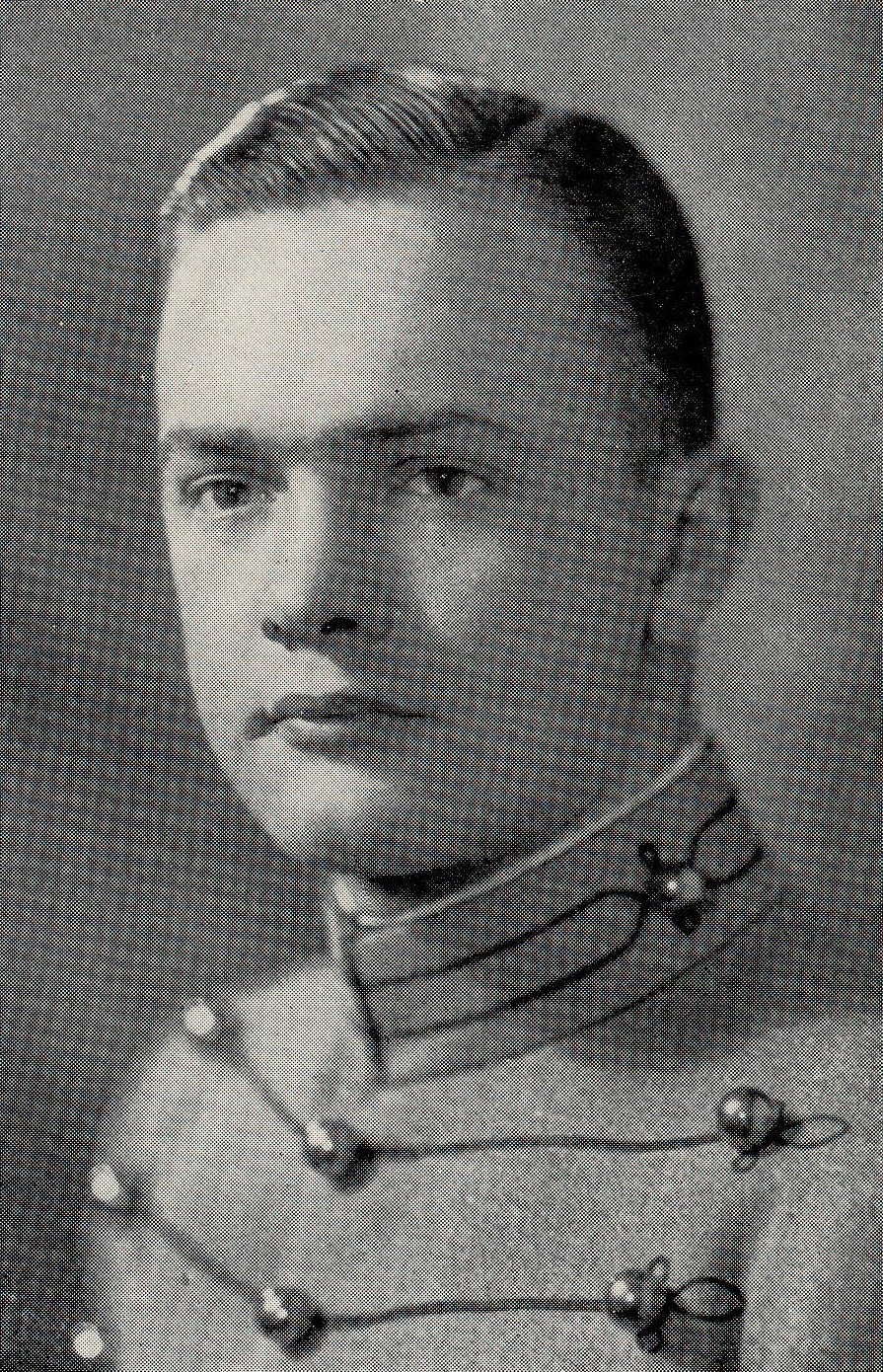
Throckmorton as a United States Military Academy cadet c. 1935

Throckmorton was born in Kansas City, Missouri, on 28 February 1913. After graduating from Culver Military Academy in 1931 he attended and graduated from the United States Military Academy on 12 June 1935, and was commissioned as a second lieutenant in the infantry.

== Military career ==
In World War II, Throckmorton was assigned to the G3 Section, First Army in the European Theater from 1943 to 1946. After the war, he served in the TAC Department at West Point from 1946 to 1949. He took command of a battalion in the 5th Regimental Combat Team in Hawaii from 1949 to 1950 and later became the regimental combat team commander from 1950 to 1951 during the Korean War. After the war, he attended the National War College in 1954, and later became Commandant of Cadets at the United States Military Academy at West Point from 1956 to 1959.

Throckmorton served from 1959 to 1960 as Assistant Commanding General, 101st Airborne Division, followed by an assignment as Secretary General Staff, Office of the Chief of Staff Army from 1960 to 1962. He took command of the 82nd Airborne Division from 1962 to 1964, then deployed to South Vietnam as Deputy Commander, Military Assistance Command, Vietnam, from 1964 to 1965. His service in Vietnam was followed by an assignment as Deputy Commander, Office of the Chief Army Reserve from 1965 to 1966.

Throckmorton also served a tour of duty in 1967, commanding Task Force Detroit during the Detroit riots.

As commanding general of XVIII Airborne Corps (right), discussing Joint Operation Clove Hitch III with Second Fleet commander Bernard A. Clarey (right), April 1967

Throckmorton held successive commands as Commanding General, XVIII Airborne Corps (1967); Commanding General, Third United States Army, (1967–1969); and Commander in Chief, United States Strike Command, (1969–1973).

Throckmorton retired in Fayetteville, North Carolina, in 1973. He died on 13 February 1986, and was buried at Arlington National Cemetery next to his wife, Regina Theresa Higgins, whom he married on 16 October 1937. The library at Fort Bragg is named in his honor.

Military offices
Preceded by Louis W. Truman	Commanding General of the Third United States Army; 1967–1969	Succeeded by Albert O. Connor
