= Albert O. Connor =

United States Army general (1914–1989)

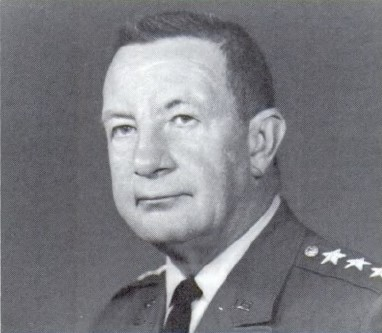
- Born: 28 August 1914; Helena, Montana, US
- Died: 20 October 1989 (aged 75); Hilton Head Island, South Carolina, US
- Military career
- Allegiance: United States
- Branch: United States Army
- Service years: 1937–1972
- Rank: Lieutenant General
- Nickname: Bert
- Commands: Third United States Army; 3rd Infantry Division; 27th Infantry Regiment; 503rd Airborne Infantry Regiment
- Conflicts: World War II; Korean War
- Awards: Distinguished Service Medal (2); Legion of Merit (3); Bronze Star Medal (2); Purple Heart

Albert Ollie Connor (28 August 1914 – 20 October 1989) was a lieutenant general in the United States Army. He served as commanding officer of the Third United States Army from 1969 to 1972. He previously served as the U.S. Army Deputy Chief of Staff for Personnel from 1967 to 1969.

== Early life and education ==
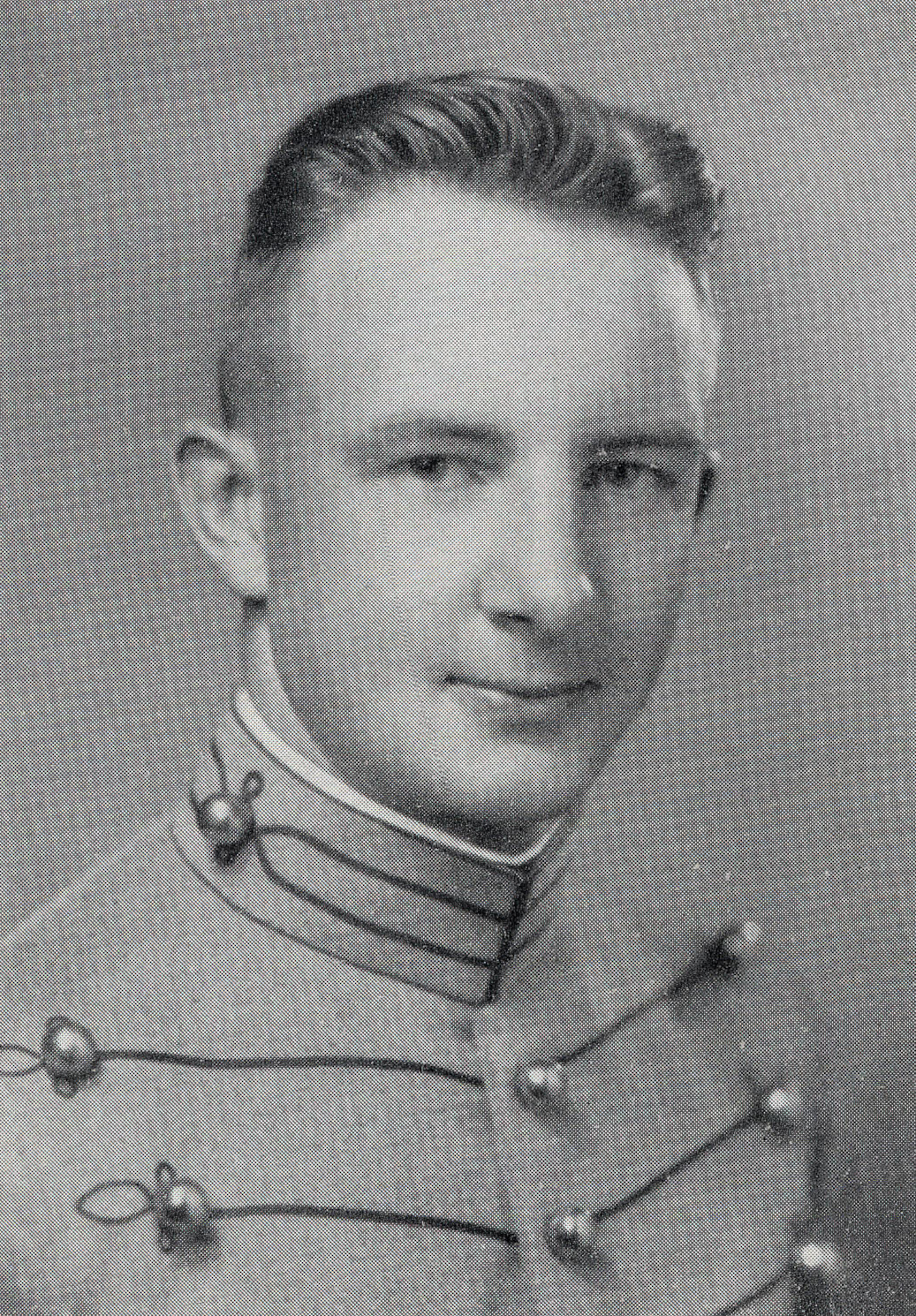
Connor as a United States Military Academy cadet c. 1937

Born and raised in Helena, Montana, Connor attended the United States Military Academy. He graduated with a B.S. degree in 1937 and was commissioned as a second lieutenant of field artillery. Connor later graduated from the Army Command and General Staff College in 1946 and the Army War College in 1952.

== Military career ==
As a junior officer, Connor was assigned to 3rd Infantry Division Artillery. During World War II, he helped to plan and then participated in assault landings in North Africa, in Sicily, at Anzio and in Southern France. In November 1944, Connor was transferred to the VI Corps headquarters staff. He was awarded two Bronze Star Medals and a Purple Heart.

In August 1947, Connor transferred from the field artillery to the infantry. He received parachute training and then served as a battalion commander in the 187th Airborne Infantry, 11th Airborne Division at Camp Campbell. Promoted to colonel in 1948, Connor was given command of the 503rd Airborne Infantry Regiment in January 1951 at Fort Campbell (renamed in 1950).

During the Korean War, Connor commanded the 27th Infantry, 25th Infantry Division and later served as deputy chief of staff for X Corps.

Promoted to brigadier general in 1960, he became deputy commanding general of Fort Dix in March 1961. Promoted to major general in 1964, he served as commanding officer of the 3rd Infantry Division in Germany. Connor helped to obtain permission from Disney Productions to use Walt Disney's Rocky the Bulldog cartoon character as a symbol for the "dogface soldiers" of the 3rd ID.

After serving five years as a lieutenant general, Connor retired from active duty on 2 June 1972.

== Personal ==
Connor was the son of Charles Ollie Connor and Marguerite P. (Simon) Connor. They were married in Helena, Montana, on 11 September 1913.

Connor married Betty Schofield Stewart on 1 June 1938 at the Cathedral of Saint Helena. They had two sons, a daughter and four grandchildren. One son became a Catholic priest and the other served in the U.S. Army, retiring as a colonel.

Connor and his wife settled at Hilton Head Island, South Carolina, after his retirement. They were buried at the West Point Cemetery.

Military offices
Preceded by John L. Throckmorton	Commanding General of the Third United States Army; 1969–1972	Succeeded by Melvin Zais
