= Joseph R. Inge =

United States Army general (1947–2023)

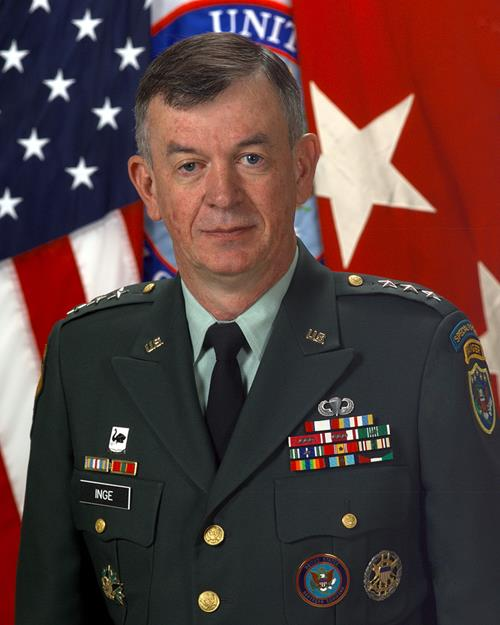
- Born: August 20, 1947; Chase City, Virginia, U.S.
- Died: March 23, 2023 (aged 75)
- Military career
- Allegiance: United States
- Branch: United States Army
- Service years: 1969–2007
- Rank: Lieutenant General
- Commands: First United States Army; United States Army, Japan; 1st Brigade, 1st Cavalry Division; 3rd Battalion, 64th Armor Regiment
- Conflicts: Gulf War
- Awards: Army Distinguished Service Medal (2); Defense Superior Service Medal; Legion of Merit (4)

Lieutenant General Joseph Richard Inge (August 20, 1947 – March 23, 2023) was an officer of the United States Army. He served as Deputy Commander, United States Northern Command, and Vice Commander, United States Element, North American Aerospace Defense Command, headquartered at Peterson Air Force Base, Colorado in 2007. He retired in 2007, after a 38-year career.

As Deputy Commander, United States Northern Command, Inge helped lead the command responsible to deter, prevent and defeat threats and aggression aimed at the United States, its territories and interests within the assigned area of responsibility and, as directed by the President or Secretary of Defense, provide defense support of civil authorities including consequence management operations.

== Youth and education ==
Joseph Richard Inge was born on August 20, 1947, in Chase City, Virginia. He was commissioned a second lieutenant of Armor and awarded a Bachelor of Science in Agriculture upon graduation from Virginia Polytechnic Institute and its Army ROTC program on June 4, 1969. He held a Master of Arts in Personnel Management and Administration from Central Michigan University. His military education included the Armor Basic and Advanced Courses, the Army Command and General Staff College, and the United States Army War College.

== Army career ==
Between April 1970 and June 1975, Inge served as a Company Commander in the 33rd Armor, 3rd Armored Division in Germany and the 73rd Armor, 2nd Infantry Division in Korea.

From June 1976 to March 1978, Inge served as Area Commander of the Jacksonville, Florida Recruiting District. He then transferred to Alexandria, Virginia to serve as Assignment Officer, Armor Branch Captains, for the United States Army Military Personnel Center until July 1980. He returned to Germany in June 1981 to serve as battalion Executive Officer for 3rd Battalion, 64th Armor, then brigade Executive Officer for First Brigade of the 3rd Infantry Division. In March 1984 he was assigned as a battalion commander of the 3rd Battalion 64th Armor, 3rd Infantry Division in Germany.

From June 1987 to April 1991, Inge held several positions in Washington, D.C., including Executive Officer, Technology Management Office, Office of the Chief of Staff, Army; Executive Officer to the Director of the Army Staff, Office of the Chief of Staff, Army; and Executive Officer to the Assistant Secretary of the Army for Installations, Logistics and Environment. In April 1991 he was appointed a Brigade Commander in the 1st Cavalry Division at Fort Hood, Texas. Following this assignment he served as Chief of Staff, United States Army Combined Arms Center, Fort Leavenworth, Kansas from May 1993 to September 1993. He then returned to Washington, D.C. to serve as Executive Assistant to the Chairman of the Joint Chiefs of Staff in Washington, D.C. until August 1995.

Following this assignment, Inge was named Assistant Division Commander (Support) of the 3rd Infantry Division (Mechanized) at Fort Stewart, Georgia, where he served until July 1996. He then returned to Kansas to serve as the Deputy Commandant of the U.S. Army Command and General Staff College. In August 1998 Inge was selected as Commanding General of United States Army, Japan/9th Theater Support Command. He served in this position until June 2000, when he was appointed Deputy, The Inspector General, Office of the Secretary of the Army, in Washington, D.C. In October 2001, Inge became commander of First United States Army, Fort Gillem, Georgia. In June 2004 he was confirmed as Deputy Commander, United States Northern Command, and Vice Commander, United States Element, North American Aerospace Defense Command.

Inge retired from active duty after 38 years of service in 2007. Inge died on March 23, 2023.

== Awards and decorations ==
- Basic Parachutist Badge
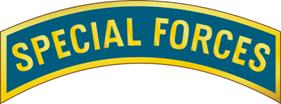
- Special Forces Tab
- Ranger Tab
- Office of the Joint Chiefs of Staff Identification Badge
- Army Staff Identification Badge
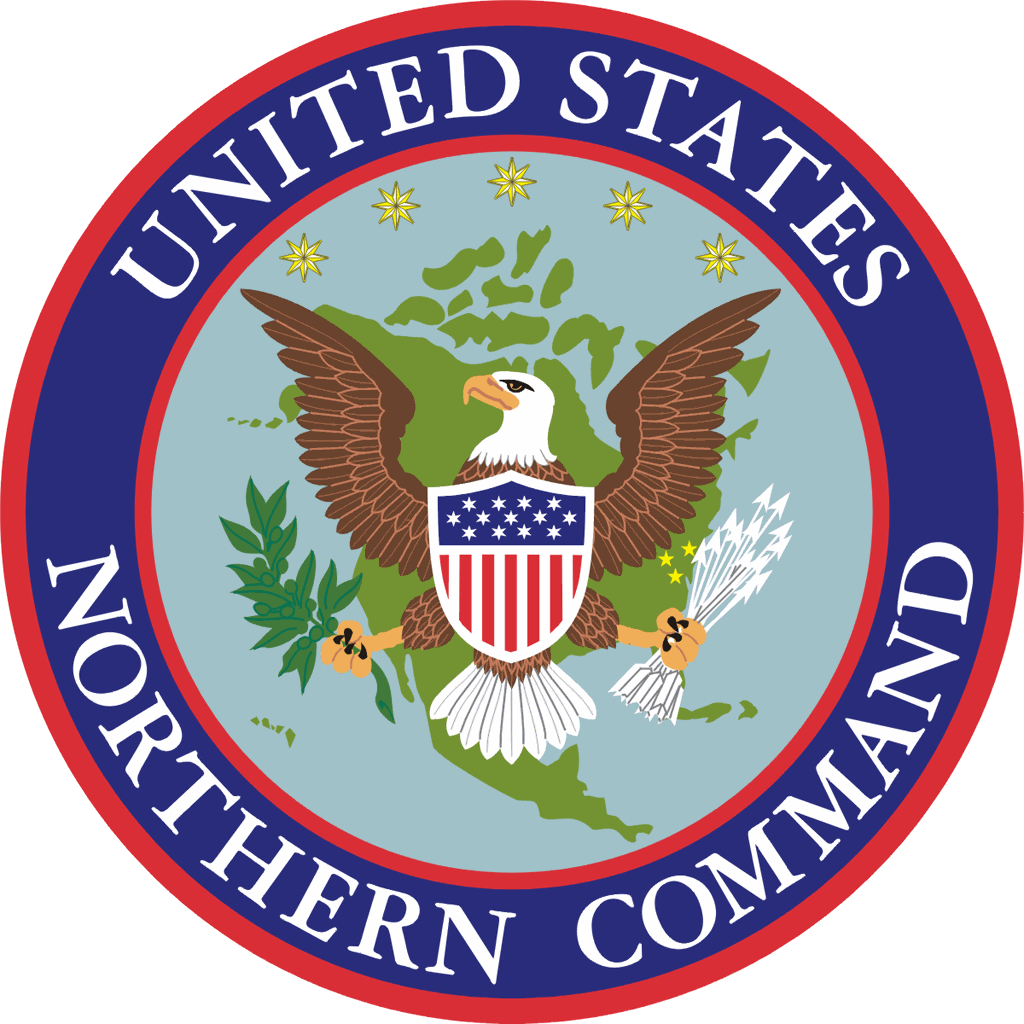
- USNORTHCOM Combat Service Identification Badge
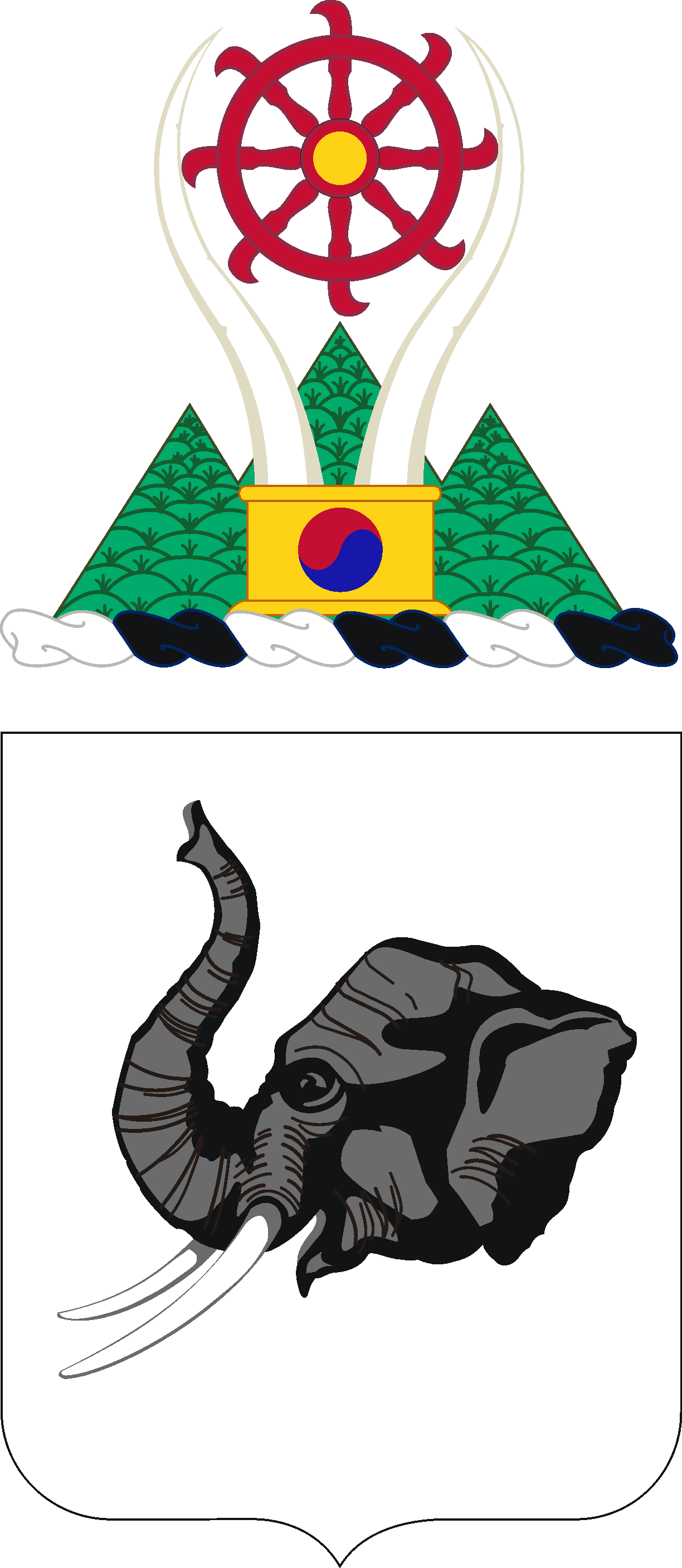
- 64th Armor Regiment Distinctive Unit Insignia
- Army Distinguished Service Medal with one bronze oak leaf cluster
- Defense Superior Service Medal
- Legion of Merit with three oak leaf clusters
- Meritorious Service Medal with three oak leaf clusters
- Army Commendation Medal with oak leaf cluster
- Army Achievement Medal with oak leaf cluster
- Joint Meritorious Unit Award
- Army Superior Unit Award
- National Defense Service Medal with two bronze service stars
- Southwest Asia Service Medal with service star
- Army Service Ribbon
- Army Overseas Service Ribbon with bronze award numeral 4
- Order of the Sacred Treasure, Japan (2nd class)
- Kuwait Liberation Medal (Kuwait)

Military offices
Preceded by Raymond F. Rees	Deputy Commander of the United States Northern Command; 2004–2007	Succeeded by William G. Webster
