= Attorney General Ross =

Attorney General Ross may refer to:

- Joseph J. Ross (1841–1900), Attorney General of Liberia
- Samuel Alfred Ross (1870–1929), Attorney General of Liberia

== See also ==
- General Ross (disambiguation)
