= James J. Lovelace =

United States Army general (1948–2024)

James J. Lovelace, Jr.
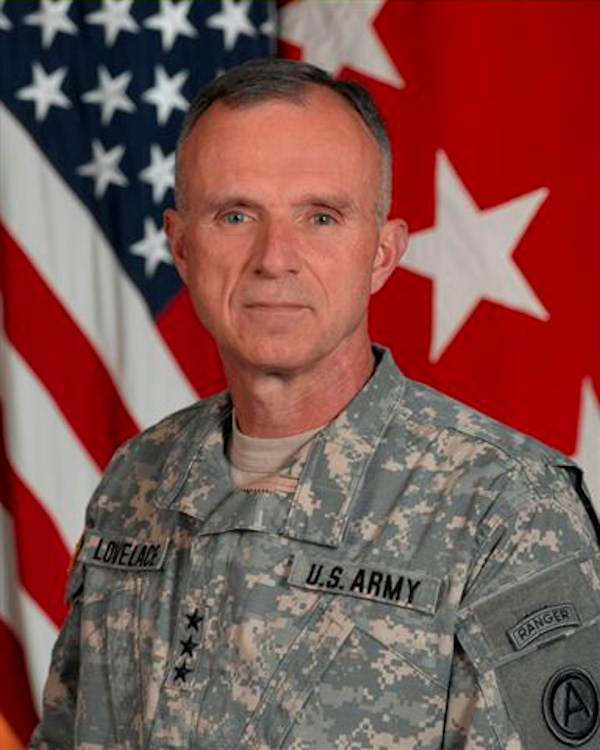
- Lieutenant General James J Lovelace
- Born: September 22, 1948; Richmond, Virginia, U.S.
- Died: July 26, 2024 (aged 75)
- Military career
- Allegiance: United States
- Branch: United States Army
- Service years: 1970–2009
- Rank: Lieutenant General
- Commands: Third United States Army; United States Army Alaska; Joint Task Force 6 Division Artillery, 6th Infantry Division
- Awards: Defense Distinguished Service Medal (2); Army Distinguished Service Medal; Defense Superior Service Medal; Legion of Merit (3)

James Judson Lovelace Jr. (September 22, 1948 – July 26, 2024) was a lieutenant general in the United States Army.

== Early life and education ==
Lovelace was born in Richmond, Virginia on September 22, 1948. He was commissioned a second lieutenant in Field Artillery upon graduation from the United States Military Academy in 1970.

Lovelace's military education includes the Field Artillery Basic and Advanced courses, the Armor Advanced Course, the Armed Forces Staff College, the Command and General Staff College, and the Naval War College. He held a master's degree in Physical Education from Indiana University, a master's degree in management from Salve Regina University, and a master's degree in National Security and Strategic Studies from the United States Naval War College.

== Military career ==
Lovelace commanded batteries in the 2nd Infantry Division and the XVIII Airborne Corps Artillery. He also served as a Director of Instruction in the Department of Physical Education at the United States Military Academy, an aide-de-camp to the Commanding General of the First United States Army at Fort Meade, Maryland, a commander of the 5th Battalion, 8th Field Artillery, an 18th Field Artillery Brigade at Fort Bragg, North Carolina, and Deputy J-5 for Plans and Programs while assigned to Alaskan Command at Elmendorf Air Force Base, Alaska. He participated in Exercise Cobra Gold.

Lovelace assumed command of United States Army Central and Coalition Forces Land Component Command on December 18, 2007.

== Death ==
Lovelace died on July 26, 2024, at the age of 75.

== Dates of rank ==
Insignia	Rank	Date
	Second Lieutenant	3 June 70
	First Lieutenant	3 June 71
	Captain	3 June 74
	Major	8 June 81
	Lieutenant Colonel	1 October 87
	Colonel	1 June 92
	Brigadier General	1 August 96
	Major General	1 August 00
	Lieutenant General	22 June 03

== Decorations and Badges ==
Parachutist Badge
Ranger Tab
Office of the Secretary of Defense Identification Badge
Office of the Joint Chiefs of Staff Identification Badge
Army Staff Identification Badge

- Distinguished Service Medal with an Oak Leaf Cluster
- Defense Superior Service Medal
- Legion of Merit with 2 Oak Leaf Clusters
- Meritorious Service Medal with 4 Oak Leaf Clusters
- Army Commendation Medal with an Oak Leaf Cluster

== Notes and references ==
Military offices
Preceded by R. Steven Whitcomb	Commanding General of the Third United States Army; 2007–2009	Succeeded by William G. Webster
