= Melvin Zais =

United States Army general

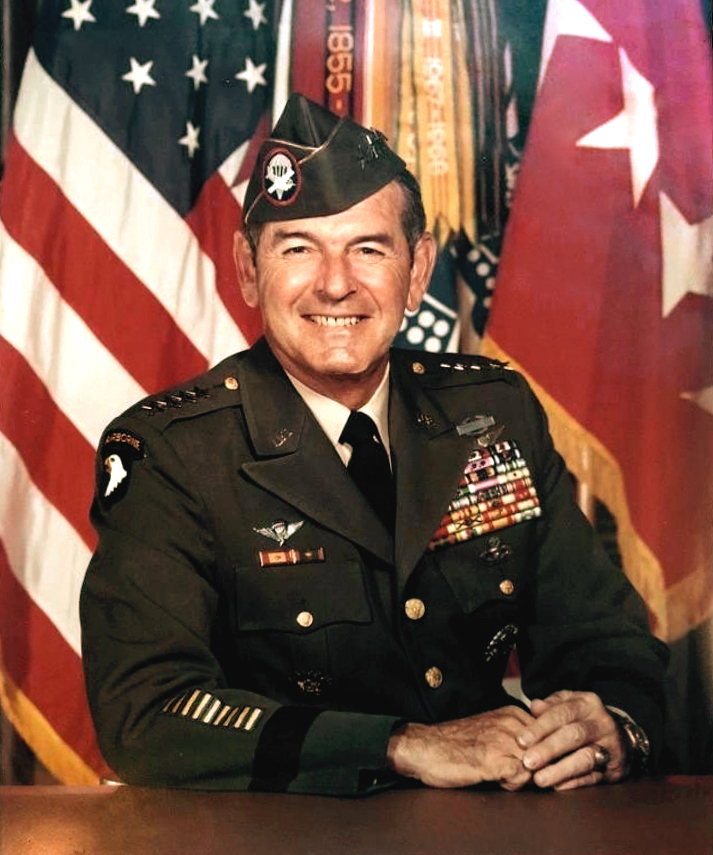
- Born: 8 May 1916; Fall River, Massachusetts, U.S.
- Died: 5 May 1981 (aged 64); Beaufort, South Carolina, U.S.
- Military career
- Allegiance: United States
- Branch: United States Army
- Service years: 1937–1976
- Rank: General
- Commands: Allied Land Forces South-Eastern Europe; Third United States Army; XXIV Corps; 101st Airborne Division; 1st Infantry Division
- Conflicts: World War II; Vietnam War
- Awards: Army Distinguished Service Medal (4); Silver Star (2); Legion of Merit (3); Distinguished Flying Cross (2); Bronze Star Medal

Melvin Zais (8 May 1916 – 5 May 1981) was a United States Army general who served in the Second World War and Vietnam War.

== Military career ==
A 1933 graduate of B.M.C. Durfee High School, Zais attended the University of New Hampshire and graduated with a Bachelor of Arts in Political Science. During his freshman year, he studied at the Louisiana State University as a journalism major before transferring to UNH. In 1937 he was commissioned a second lieutenant in the United States Army Reserve. In 1940 he was a member of the original Parachute battalion later the 501st Parachute Infantry Regiment. During World War II, Zais was the commander of the 3rd Battalion and, later, executive officer of the 517th Parachute Infantry Regiment, fighting in Italy, in southern France, and in the Battle of the Bulge.

Zais attended the United States Army Command and General Staff College, and was also a graduate of the Armed Forces Staff College, and the National War College. He was promoted to brigadier general on 1 June 1964; major general on 1 May 1967; and lieutenant general on 1 August 1969. He was named Commanding General, Allied Land Forces South-Eastern Europe, İzmir, Turkey, effective August 1973 following his promotion to general on July 13 the month prior.

Zais' assignments included Assistant Division Commander, 1st Infantry Division, United States Army, Vietnam, 1966; Director of Individual Training, Office, Deputy Chief of Staff for Personnel, United States Army, Washington, D.C., 1966–68. In that role he was instrumental in originating the concept that resulted in the creation of the noncommissioned Officer candidate program. During this time he led the army liaison team responsible for the involvement of Federal troops in suppressing the April 1968 Baltimore riot; Commanding General, 101st Airborne Division (then designated as Airmobile), Vietnam, 1968–69. He led the 101st Airborne Division in the Battle of Hamburger Hill against the People's Army of Vietnam. He then became the Commanding General, XXIV Corps, Vietnam, 1969–70.

After returning from Vietnam, Zais served Director for Operations, J-3, Organization of the Joint Chiefs of Staff, Washington, D.C., 1970–72 and as Commanding General, Third United States Army from 1972 to 1973.

On 1 August 1973, Zais was promoted to the rank of four-star general and appointed as Commander, Allied Land Forces South-Eastern Europe. He held the position until his retirement on 31 May 1976. Zais died on 5 May 1981, in Beaufort, South Carolina.

== Awards and decorations ==
Combat Infantryman Badge
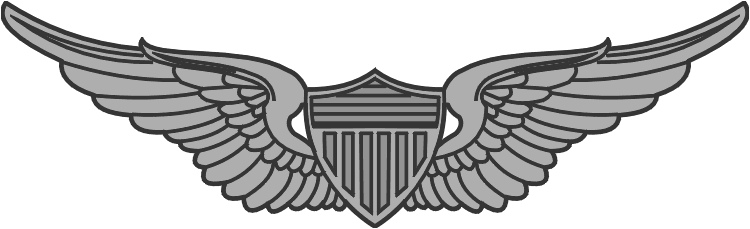
Basic Army Aviator Badge
Master Combat Parachutist Badge with one bronze jump star
Joint Chiefs of Staff Identification Badge
Army Staff Identification Badge
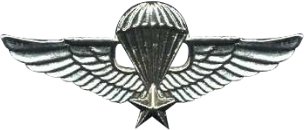
Vietnam Master Parachutist Badge
101st Airborne Division Shoulder Sleeve Insignia
9 Overseas Service Bars

Army Distinguished Service Medal with three bronze oak leaf clusters
Silver Star with oak leaf cluster
Legion of Merit with two oak leaf clusters
Distinguished Flying Cross with oak leaf cluster
Bronze Star Medal
Purple Heart
Air Medal with Valor device and bronze award numeral 26
Joint Service Commendation Medal
Army Commendation Medal with oak leaf cluster
American Defense Service Medal with one bronze service star
American Campaign Medal
European–African–Middle Eastern Campaign Medal with four service stars
World War II Victory Medal
National Defense Service Medal with service star
Vietnam Service Medal with seven service stars
National Order of Vietnam, Commander
National Order of Vietnam, Officer
Vietnam Army Distinguished Service Order, 1st class
Vietnam Gallantry Cross with palm
Vietnam Armed Forces Honor Medal, 1st class
Vietnam Civil Actions Medal, 1st class
Vietnam Gallantry Cross Unit Citation
Vietnam Civil Actions Medal Unit Citation
Vietnam Campaign Medal

Military offices
Preceded by Albert O. Connor	Commanding General of the Third United States Army; 1972–1973	Succeeded by Warren Bennett
Preceded by Olinto M. Barsanti	Commanding General of the 101st Airborne Division; 1968–1969	Succeeded by John Wright
