= William G. Webster =

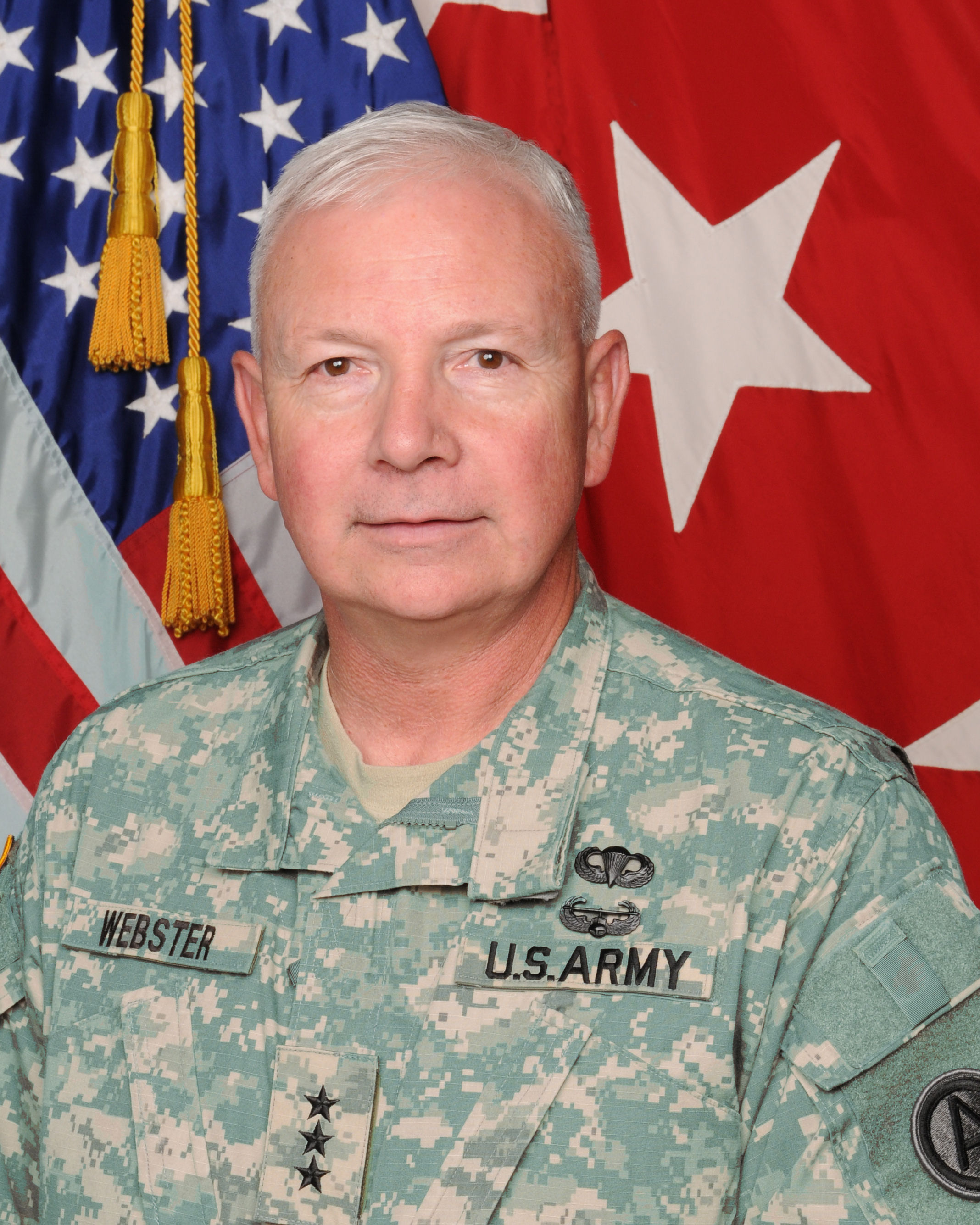
- Born: July 3, 1951 (age 75); Baton Rouge, Louisiana, U.S.
- Military career
- Allegiance: United States
- Branch: United States Army
- Service years: 1974–2011
- Rank: Lieutenant General
- Commands: United States Army Central; National Training Center; 3rd Infantry Division
- Conflicts: Iraq War
- Awards: Defense Distinguished Service Medal (2); Army Distinguished Service Medal (2); Defense Superior Service Medal; Legion of Merit (5); Bronze Star Medal (2)

Lieutenant General William Glenn Webster (born July 3, 1951) is a retired senior officer in the United States Army and a former commander of the Third United States Army/United States Army Central. Webster assumed command of the Third Army/Army Central on May 9, 2009 from Lieutenant General James J. Lovelace and during his tenure was responsible for moving the Third Army's headquarters from Fort McPherson, where it had resided for 62 years, to Shaw Air Force Base in 2011. Webster was succeeded as commanding officer of the Third Army upon his retirement by Lieutenant General Vincent K. Brooks on June 3, 2011. While commanding Third Army, Webster oversaw the transition towards full-spectrum operations in the Third Army from a more narrow focus on combat operations as well as the Third Army's role in sustaining United States military activity in Iraq and Afghanistan.

== Military career ==
Webster received his commission upon graduation from the United States Military Academy in 1974. Webster held commands within every level of the army, ranging from platoon to field army.

From 1974 to 1978, Webster served as a Platoon Leader, Executive Officer and Company Commander in the 5th Infantry Division at Fort Polk. From 1979 to 1982, he served as Chief of Operations for the 7th Army Training Command and 3d Battalion, 64th Armor, 3rd Infantry Division in Germany. Webster then moved to Fort Stewart, where he served as Chief of Operations for the 24th Infantry Division and then for the 1st Brigade, 24th Infantry Division. In 1987, he served a one-year tour as aide to the Commander, United States Army Forces Command at Fort McPherson. He served as a War Plans Officer on the Joint Staff in Washington, D.C., from 1988 to 1991. In 1991, he assumed command of the 2d Battalion, 77th Armor, 4th Infantry Division at Fort Carson. From 1993 to 1994, he served as the Armor Task Force Trainer at the United States Army National Training Center in Fort Irwin. He commanded the 1st Brigade, 1st Cavalry Division in Fort Hood, Texas from 1995 to 1997, and deployed to the Republic of Korea. He was then assigned as Assistant Division Commander (Maneuver), 3rd Infantry Division at Fort Stewart. He commanded the 3d Infantry Division (Forward) in Kuwait for Operation Desert Thunder II. In 1998, Webster was assigned as Commanding General of the National Training Center at Fort Irwin. From 2000 to 2001, he served as Director of Training for the United States Army in the Pentagon. In December 2001, he became Deputy Operations Officer (DJ3) for United States Central Command at MacDill Air Force Base, and in the United States Central Command area of operations, including deployment to Operation Enduring Freedom. During the buildup in Kuwait and attack into Iraq from 2002 to 2003, he was Deputy Commanding General of Third Army and all ground forces for Operation Iraqi Freedom.

As the Commander of the 3rd Infantry Division from 2003 to 2006, Webster returned his unit from combat, reorganized and trained it, and redeployed it into Baghdad. He commanded the 40,000 men and women of MultiNational Division Baghdad from 2005 to 2006. Webster then served as the United States Northern Command Director of Operations and Deputy Commander of United States Northern Command (NORTHCOM) from 2006 to 2009.

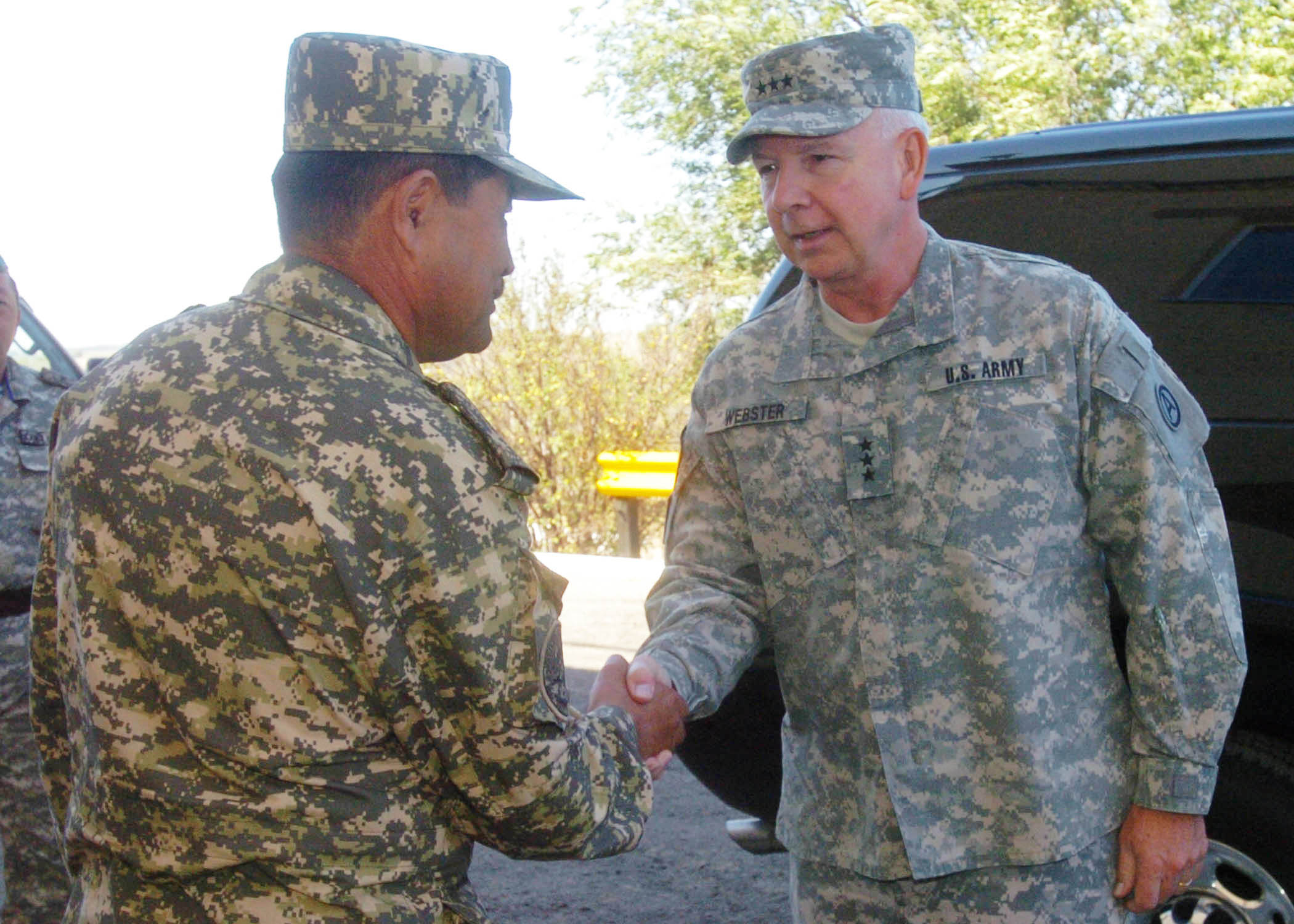
Major General Adilbek Aldaberpenov (left) of the Kazakh Airmobile Forces greets General Webster at KAZBAT headquarters, 1 October 2009.

Webster was the Deputy Commander of United States Northern Command and Vice Commander of the United States Element, North American Aerospace Defense Command, headquartered at Peterson Air Force Base. Webster retired from the United States Army after transferring command of the Third Army to Vincent K. Brooks on June 3, 2011, and continued to teach and coach leaders as a civilian for the army and other organizations. Webster has also attended the US Army Command and General Staff College, the US Army War College, and the School of Advanced Military Studies.

== Awards ==
During his military career, Webster received the Defense Distinguished Service Medal (2), the Army Distinguished Service Medal (2), the Legion of Merit (5), and the Bronze Star Medal (2).

Military offices
Preceded by Joseph R. Inge	Deputy Commander of the United States Northern Command; 2007–2009	Succeeded by H. Steven Blum
Preceded by James J. Lovelace	Commanding General of the Third United States Army; 2009—2011	Succeeded by Vincent K. Brooks
