= Louis W. Truman =

United States Army general

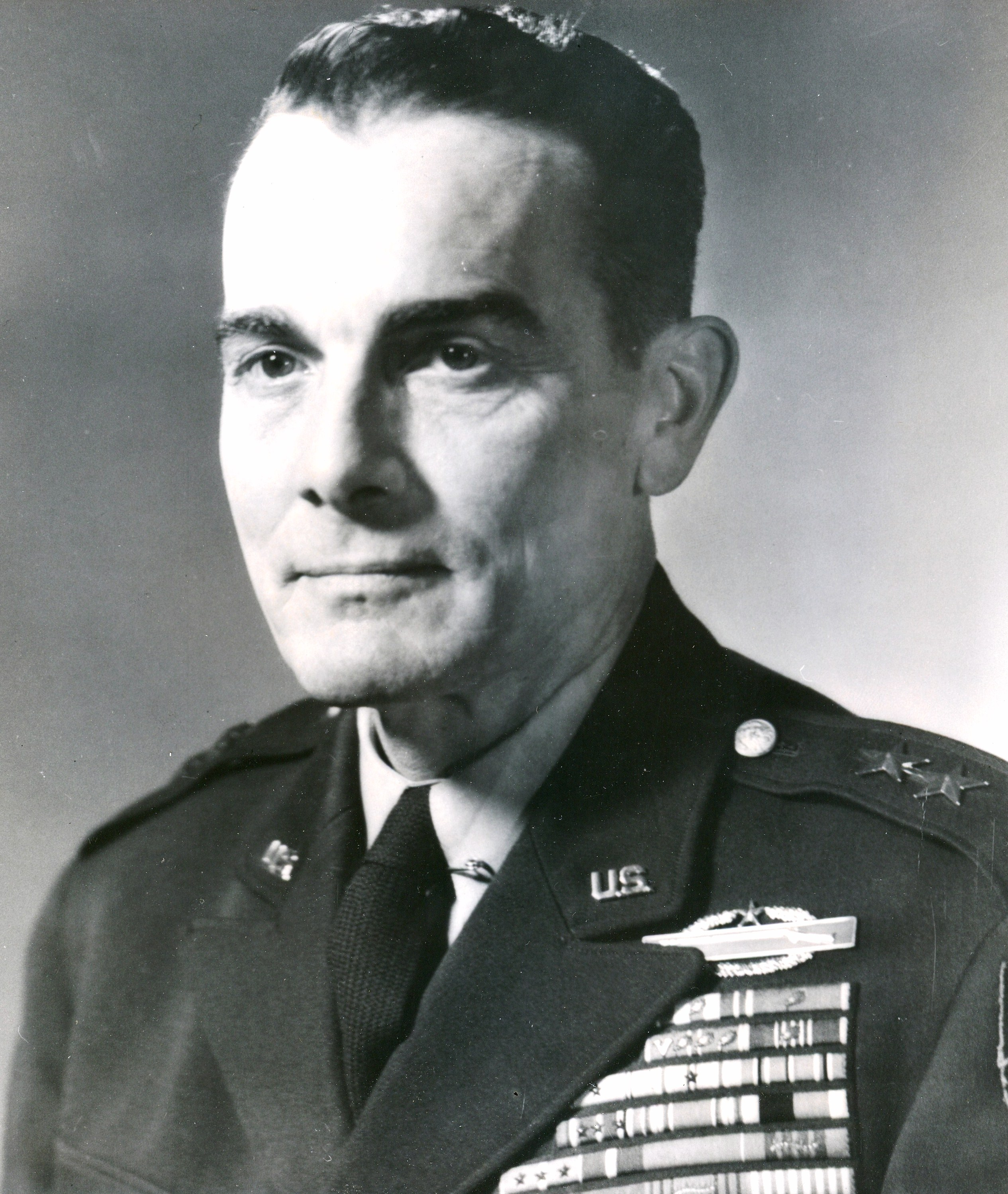
- Louis W. Truman sometime between 1956-1962
- Born: June 20, 1908; Kansas City, Missouri
- Died: December 2, 2004 (aged 96); Atlanta, Georgia
- Relatives: Major General Ralph E. Truman (father); Harry S. Truman (cousin)
- Military career
- Allegiance: United States
- Branch: United States Army
- Service years: 1926–1967
- Rank: Lieutenant General
- Service number: 0-18755
- Commands: Third United States Army; VII Corps; 4th Infantry Division; 223rd Infantry Regiment
- Conflicts: World War II; Korean War
- Awards: Army Distinguished Service Medal; Silver Star (2); Legion of Merit (2); Bronze Star Medal (3)

Lieutenant General Louis Watson Truman (June 20, 1908 – December 2, 2004) was a senior United States Army officer. He served as Commanding General of the Third United States Army. Truman's father, Major General Ralph E. Truman, was a cousin of President Harry S. Truman, and he served as his aide-de-camp during Truman's inauguration in 1948.

== Military service ==
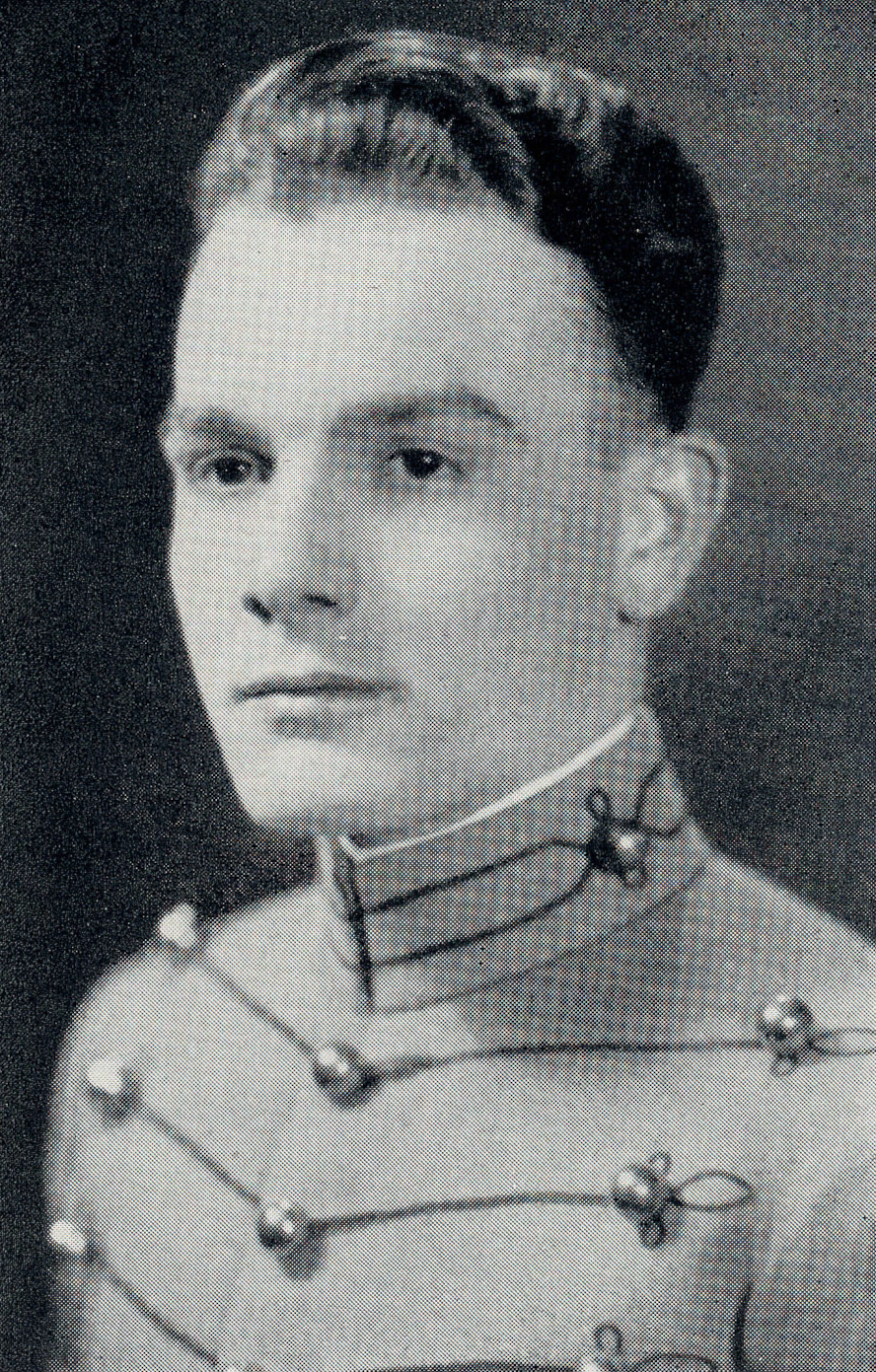
Truman as a West Point cadet in 1932

In 1926, Truman enlisted in Company E, 140th Infantry Regiment, of the Missouri National Guard, stationed at Kennett, Missouri. In July 1928, he entered the United States Military Academy at West Point. Upon graduation in June 1932, he was commissioned an infantry second lieutenant.

Truman's first duty assignment was with the 6th Infantry Regiment at Jefferson Barracks, Missouri. In 1936, Truman was assigned to Fort Benning, Georgia, where he completed the Infantry School and the Tank School. Next, he served a two-year tour of duty at Fort Davis, Panama, in the Canal Zone, and returned to Fort Benning in September 1940 as a staff and logistics officer in the 2nd Armored Division's 14th Armored Brigade. The 2nd Armored Division at the time was commanded by one of the Army's fastest-rising officers, Brigadier General George S. Patton, Jr.

In January 1941, Truman was transferred to Pearl Harbor, Hawaii, where he was an aide-de-camp to Lieutenant General Walter C. Short, commanding general of the Hawaiian Department. Truman was an eyewitness when the Japanese launched their attack on the base on December 7, 1941. He would continue to serve there until February 1942.

In March 1942, Truman was promoted to major and was assigned to Army Ground Forces headquarters in Washington, D.C., first as an assistant G-3 (operations and training officer) and later as secretary of the general staff for AGF commander Lieutenant General Lesley J. McNair. In April 1944, now a lieutenant colonel, he joined the 84th Infantry Division at Camp Claiborne, Louisiana. He served as division chief of staff and later as acting assistant division commander.

In early November 1944, now a colonel with only twelve years commissioned service, Truman landed over Omaha Beach with the 84th Infantry Division. He saw combat in the European Theater along the Siegfried Line, the Battle of the Bulge, and in Germany from the Roer to the Elbe Rivers.

In January 1946, Truman was assigned to Headquarters, United States Forces European Theater, at Frankfurt, Germany, as Deputy Theater Chief for Special Services. From 1946 to 1948, he was assigned as Secretary, United States Delegation, United Nations Military Staff Committee. Truman was a student at the National War College from 1948 to 1949. After his graduation from the War College, Truman was a member of the Joint Strategic Planning Group, Office of the Joint Chiefs of Staff, at the Pentagon.

Two years after the start of the Korean War, Truman commanded the 223rd Infantry Regiment of the 40th Infantry Division from July 1952 to January 1953. He saw combat first-hand and later served as assistant division commander of the 2nd Infantry Division until the end of hostilities in July 1953. Later that year, he was promoted to the rank of brigadier general and for the next two years, he served Third Army chief of staff at Fort McPherson, Georgia.

In 1955, Truman was transferred to Naples, Italy, where he was the deputy G-3 for NATO's Southern European Command. Truman received a promotion to major general in 1956, and with it the chairmanship of the Military Assistance Advisory Group, Karachi, Pakistan. Truman later returned to the United States to take command of the 4th Infantry Division at Fort Lewis, Washington, from 1958 until 1960. Subsequently, he was assigned as deputy G-3 and later as deputy commanding general of the United States Continental Army Command at Fort Monroe, Virginia from 1960 to 1962. In that same capacity, Truman also commanded Joint Task Force Four.

In 1962, President John F. Kennedy nominated Truman for promotion to lieutenant general and, from 1963 until 1965, he commanded the VII Corps at Kelley Barracks, Stuttgart, Germany. His final assignment was his selection by the army's senior leadership to be the commanding general of the Third United States Army, at Fort McPherson. Truman commanded the Third Army for two years until his retirement on August 1, 1967.

== Dates of rank ==
No insignia	Cadet, United States Military Academy: July 2, 1928
	Second Lieutenant, Regular Army: June 10, 1932
	First Lieutenant, Regular Army: August 1, 1935
	Captain (temporary), Army of the United States: September 9, 1940
	Major (temporary), Army of the United States: February 1, 1942
	Captain, Regular Army: June 10, 1942
	Lieutenant Colonel (temporary), Army of the United States: January 1, 1943
	Colonel (temporary), Army of the United States: August 10, 1944
	Lieutenant Colonel (temporary), Army of the United States: July 1, 1947
	Lieutenant Colonel, Regular Army: July 1, 1948
	Colonel (temporary), Army of the United States: September 7, 1950
	Brigadier General (temporary), Army of the United States: March 16, 1953
	Colonel, Regular Army: December 1, 1953
	Brigadier General, Regular Army: May 12, 1960
	Major General, Regular Army: August 29, 1960
	Lieutenant General (temporary), Army of the United States: May 1, 1962

== Awards ==
During his military career, Truman was awarded the Army Distinguished Service Medal, two Silver Stars, two Legions of Merit, three Bronze Star Medals (one with "V" device), two Army Commendation Medals, and the Combat Infantryman Badge with one star. He also wore the American Defense Service Medal, American Campaign Medal, the Asiatic-Pacific Campaign Medal, the European-African-Middle Eastern Campaign Medal, the World War II Victory Medal, The Army of Occupation Medal (Germany), two National Defense Service Medals, Korean Service Medal and UN Service Medal.

- Army Distinguished Service Medal
- Silver Star with one oak leaf cluster
- Legion of Merit with one oak leaf cluster
- Bronze Star with two oak leaf clusters and Valor Device
- Army Commendation Medal with one oak leaf cluster
- American Defense Service Medal
- American Campaign Medal
- European-African-Middle Eastern Campaign Medal with three bronze service stars
- Asiatic-Pacific Campaign Medal with one bronze service star
- World War II Victory Medal
- Army of Occupation Medal with Germany Clasp
- National Defense Service Medal with bronze star
- Korean Service Medal with three bronze service stars
- United Nations Service Medal

Along with his army awards, Truman received several foreign decorations; the Legion of Honor and Croix de Guerre from France, the Order of Leopold and Croix de Guerre from Belgium, the Order of Orange Nassau from the Netherlands, the Order of the Patriotic War First Class (USSR) and the Presidential Unit Citation from the Republic of Korea.

Truman also received many civilian honors. Among them were an honorary Doctorate of Laws degree from Drury College in Springfield, Missouri, a proclamation of July 27, 1967 as "Lt. Gen. Louis W. Truman Day" by former Atlanta Mayor Ivan Allen, Jr. in December 1975 and another proclamation from the Georgia Chamber of Commerce. He was also the third recipient of the "Good Neighbor Award" from the Harry S. Truman Foundation in 1975. Recently, Truman was honored by the West Point Society of Atlanta with its "Distinguished Graduate Award."

== Retirement ==
After his retirement from the Army, Truman served as commissioner of the Georgia Department of Industry and Trade under Georgia governors Lester Maddox, Jimmy Carter, and George Busbee. From 1976 to 1984, Truman was vice president and special assistant to the president of Adams/Cates Realty in Atlanta, Georgia.

Truman resided in Atlanta until his death on December 2, 2004, at the age of 96. He was preceded in death by his father, his mother Nanny Louise Watson Truman, his brother Colonel Corbie Truman, his sister Henrietta Truman Davidson, and his first wife Margaret Stevenson Truman. Truman was interred at the West Point Cemetery on May 31, 2005.

Military offices
Preceded by William C. Bullock	Commanding General of the Third United States Army; 1965–1967	Succeeded by John L. Throckmorton
