= Theodore G. Jenes Jr. =

United States Army general (1930–2023)

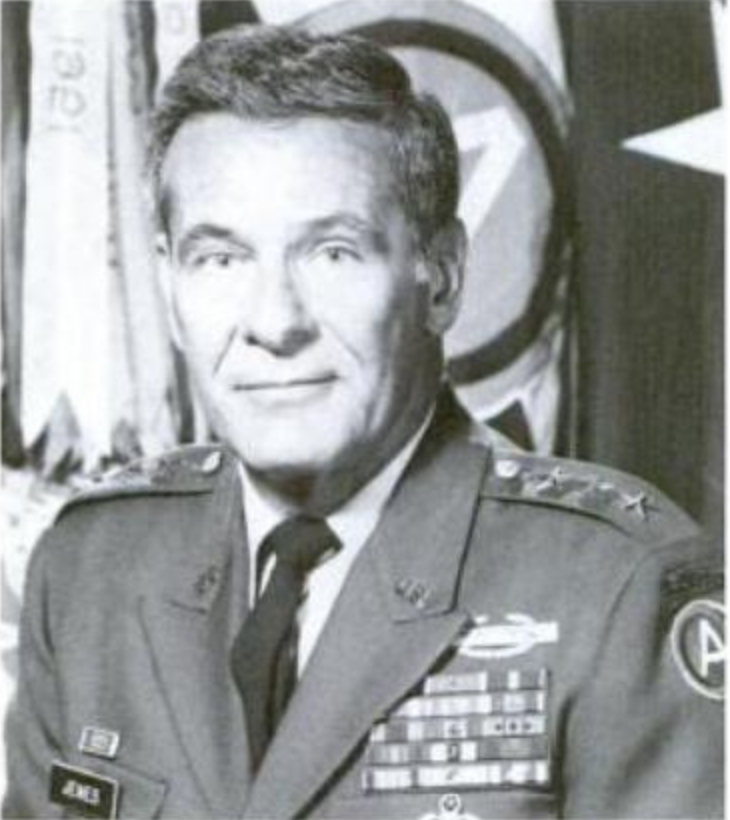
- Born: February 21, 1930; Portland, Oregon, U.S.
- Died: May 2, 2023 (aged 93)
- Military career
- Allegiance: United States
- Branch: United States Army
- Service years: 1951–1987
- Rank: Lieutenant General
- Commands: United States Army Central; 4th Infantry Division; 172nd Infantry Brigade; 3rd Brigade, 2nd Infantry Division; 2nd Battalion, 509th Infantry Regiment
- Conflicts: Vietnam War
- Awards: Army Distinguished Service Medal; Legion of Merit (2); Bronze Star Medal

Theodore G. Jenes Jr. (February 21, 1930 – May 2, 2023) was a lieutenant general in the United States Army. He was the commanding general of United States Army Central from 1984 to 1987 as well as Deputy Commanding General of United States Army Forces Command. Previously he served as Chief of Staff of the Eighth Army and Deputy Commander of the Combined Arm Combat Developments Activity at Fort Leavenworth, Kansas. Jenes earned a B.S. degree from the University of Georgia and an M.S. degree from Auburn University. He died on May 2, 2023, at the age of 93.
