= United States Army Central =

Theater Army of the U.S. Army

- Shoulder sleeve insignia
- Active: 7 November 1918–2 July 1919; 9 August 1932–1 October 1973; 1 December 1982–present
- Country: United States of America
- Branch: United States Army
- Type: Army Service Component Command/Theater Army
- Role: Headquarters
- Part of: U.S. Department of the Army; U.S. Central Command
- Garrison/HQ: Shaw Air Force Base, South Carolina
- Nickname: "Patton's Own"
- Mottos: Tertia Semper Prima (Latin for "Third Always First")
- Colors: White and red
- Wars: World War I; Occupation of Germany; World War II; Normandy; Northern France; Rhineland; Ardennes-Alsace; Central Europe; Occupation of Germany; Southwest Asia; Defense of Saudi Arabia; Liberation and Defense of Kuwait; Cease-Fire; Global War on Terrorism; Afghanistan; Iraq; 2026 Iran War
- Decorations: Meritorious Unit Commendation with Two Oak Leaf Clusters; Superior Unit Award
- Website: Official website

Commanders
- Current commander: LTG Kevin C. Leahy
- Deputy Commanding General: BG Peter C. Glass
- Command Sergeant Major: CSM Eric R. McCray
- Notable commanders: Walter Krueger; Courtney Hodges; George S. Patton; Lucian Truscott; Thomas J. H. Trapnell; Tommy Franks; David D. McKiernan; Vincent K. Brooks; Michael X. Garrett

Insignia
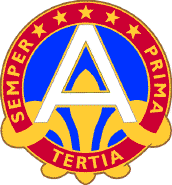
- Distinctive unit insignia

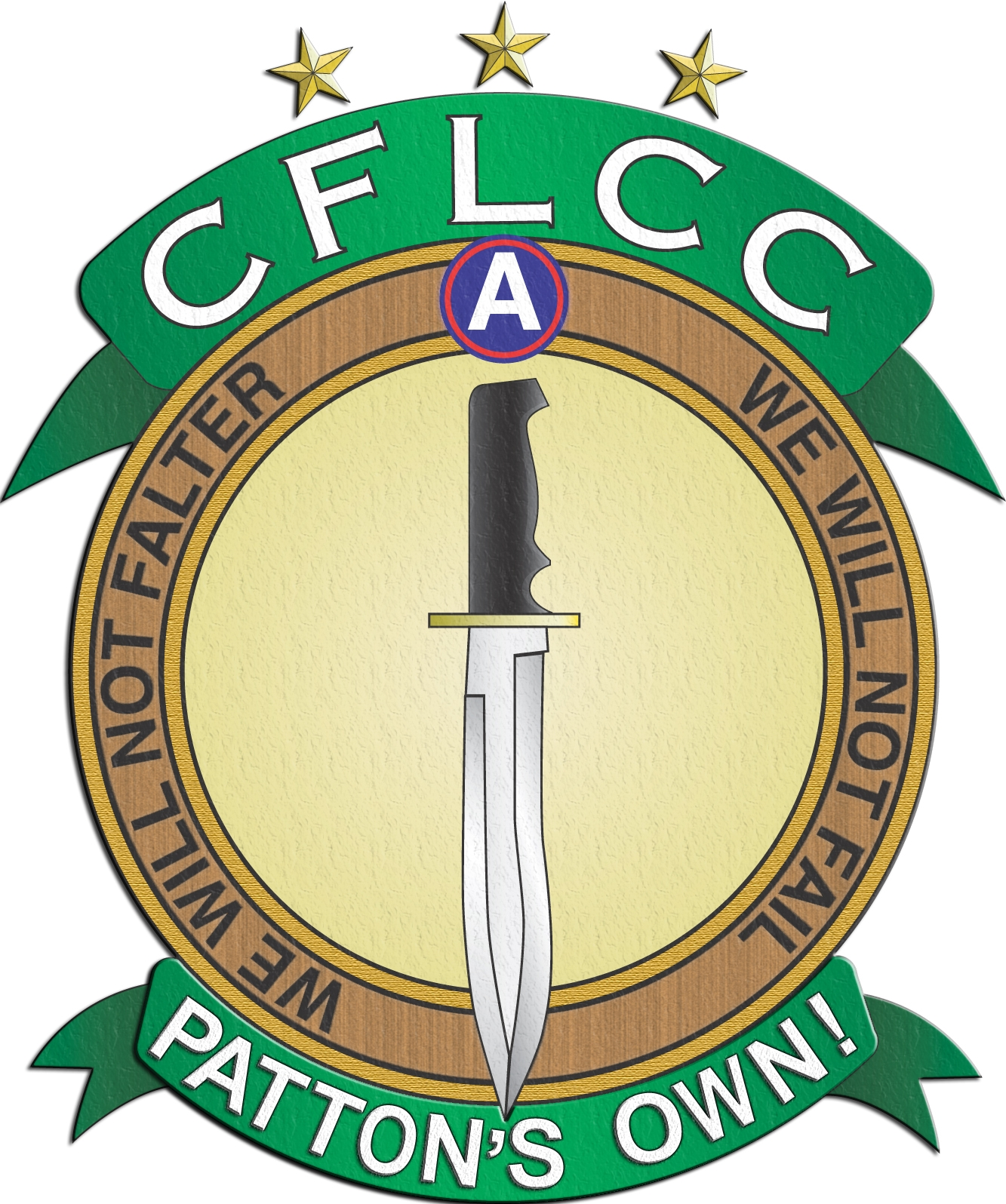
- CFLCC Logo

- Flag

- NATO Map Symbol (1997)

- NATO Map Symbol (2004)

The United States Army Central, formerly the Third United States Army, commonly referred to as the Third Army and as ARCENT, is a military formation of the United States Army that saw service in World War I and World War II, in the 1991 Gulf War, and in the coalition occupation of Iraq. It is best known for its campaigns in World War II under the command of General George S. Patton.

The Third Army is headquartered at Shaw Air Force Base, South Carolina with a forward element at Camp Arifjan, Kuwait. It serves as the echelon above corps for the Army component of CENTCOM, whose area of responsibility (AOR) includes Southwest Asia, around 20 countries of the world, in Africa, Asia, and the Persian Gulf.

== World War I ==
The Third United States Army was first activated during the First World War on 7 November 1918, at Chaumont, France, when the General Headquarters of the American Expeditionary Forces (AEF) issued General Order 198 organizing the Third Army and announcing its headquarters staff. On the 15th, four days after the Armistice with Germany, Major General Joseph T. Dickman assumed command and issued Third Army General Order No. 1. The Third Army consisted of three corps (III Corps, Major General John L. Hines; IV Corps, Major General Charles Henry Muir; and VII Corps, Major General William G. Haan) and seven divisions.

=== First mission ===
On 15 November 1918, Major General Dickman was given the mission to move quickly and by any means into the Rhineland on occupation duties. He was to disarm and disband German forces as ordered by General John J. Pershing, commander of the AEF.

The march into the Rhineland for occupation duty was begun on 17 November 1918. By 15 December the Third Army Headquarters at Mayen opened at Koblenz. Two days later, on 17 December 1918, the Koblenz bridgehead, consisting of a pontoon bridge and three railroad bridges across the Rhine, had been established.

Third Army troops had encountered no hostile act of any sort. In the occupied area, both food and coal supplies were sufficient. The crossing of the Rhine by the front line divisions was effected in good time and without confusion. Troops, upon crossing the Rhine and reaching their assigned areas, were billeted preparatory to occupying selected positions for defense. The strength of the Third Army as of 19 December, the date the bridgehead occupation was completed, was 9,638 officers and 221,070 enlisted men.

=== Third Army advance ===
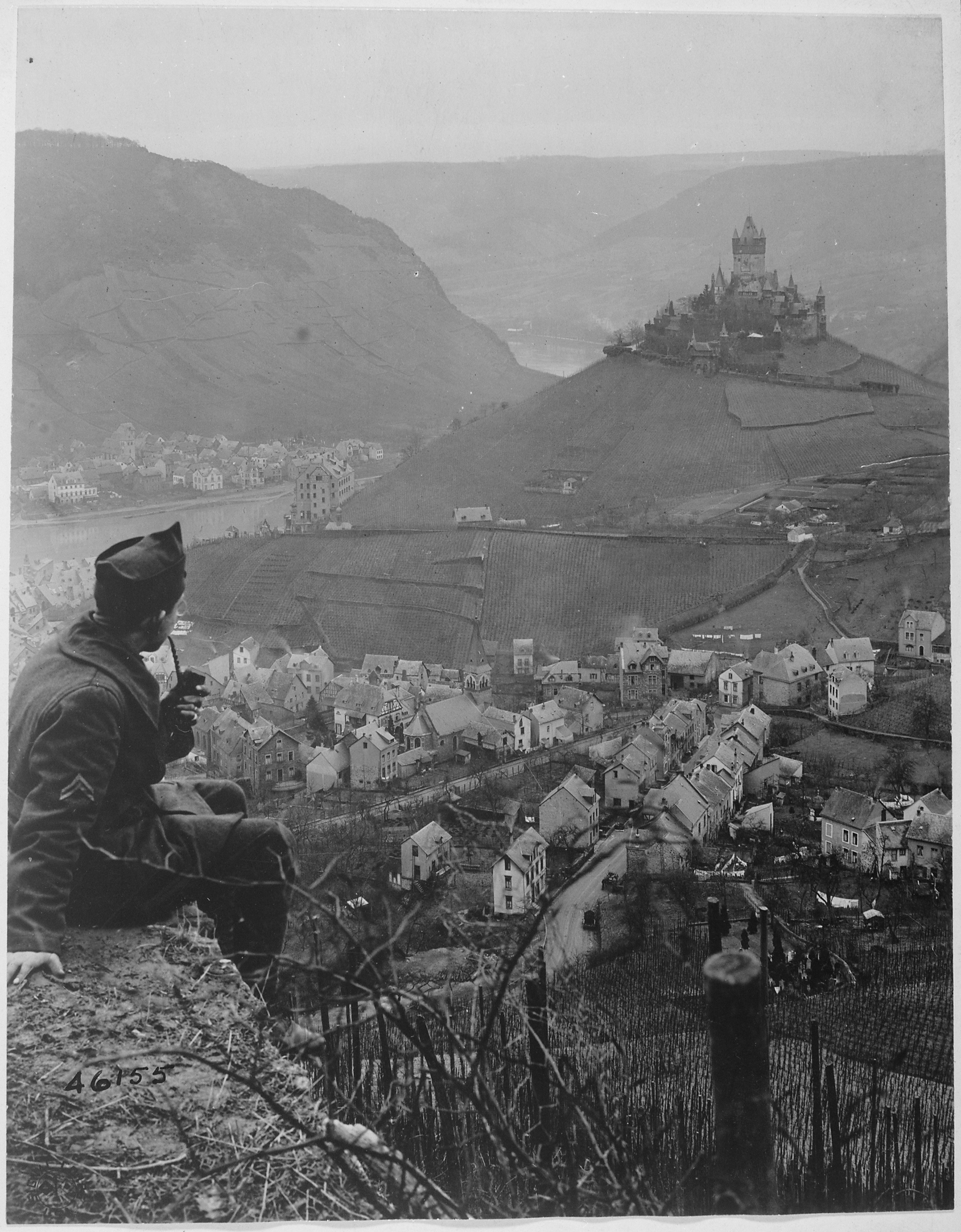
The castle above the Moselle in Cochem, Germany, was home to the IV Corps, Third Army, in 1919.

On 12 December, Field Order No. 11 issued, directed the Third Army to occupy the northern sector of the Coblenz bridgehead, with the advance elements to cross the Rhine river at seven o'clock, 13 December. The northern (left) boundary remained unchanged. The southern (right) boundary was as has been previously mentioned.

Before the advance, the 1st Division passed to the command of the III Corps. With three divisions, the 1st, 2d, and 32d, the III Corps occupied the American sector of the Coblenz bridgehead, the movement of the troops into position beginning at the scheduled hour, 13 December. The four bridges available for crossing the river within the Coblenz bridgehead were the pontoon bridge and railroad bridge at Coblenz, the railroad bridges at Engers and Remagen. On 13 December the advance began with the American khaki crossing the Rhine into advanced positions. On the same day the 42d Division passed to the command of the IV Corps, which, in support of the III Corps, continued its march to occupy the Kreise of Mayen, Ahrweiler, Adenau, and Cochem.

The VII Corps occupied under the same order that portion of the Regierungsbezirk of Trier within army limits.

On 15 December, Third Army Headquarters at Mayen opened at Coblenz: III Corps Headquarters at Polch opened at Neuwied and IV Corps Headquarters remained at Cochem, with the VII Corps at Grevenmacher. In crossing the Rhine on the shortened front—from Rolandseck to Rhens on the west bank—the Third

Army encountered no hostile act of any sort. In the occupied area both food and coal supplies were sufficient.

By the night of 14 December, Third Army troops had occupied their positions on the perimeter of the Coblenz bridgehead.

=== Army of Occupation ===
During January 1919, the Third Army was engaged in training and preparing the troops under its command for any contingency. A letter of instruction was circulated to lower commanders prescribing a plan of action in case hostilities were resumed. Installations were set up throughout the Army area to facilitate command.

In February, military schools were opened through the Third Army area; a quartermaster depot was organized; 2,000 officers and enlisted men left to take courses in British and French universities; better leave facilities were created; and plans for sending American divisions to the United States were made. On 4 February, the military control of the Stadtkreis of Trier was transferred from GHQ to the Third Army.

In March, routine duties of occupation and training were carried on; an Army horse show was held; Army, corps, and divisional educational centers were established in the Third Army Zone; the Coblenz port commander took over the duties of the Coblenz regulating officer; and the 42d Division was released from IV Corps and was placed in Army Reserve.

In April, the exodus of American divisions from Third Army to the United States began. During the month, motor transport parks were established; an Army motor show was held; the Army area was reorganized; and the centralization of military property was initiated in anticipation of returning it to the United States. On 20 April 1919, Third Army command changed from Maj. Gen. Dickman to Lt. Gen. Hunter Liggett.

=== Preparations to advance ===
On 14 May 1919, Marshal Ferdinand Foch, General-in-Chief of the Allied Armies, submitted plans of operations to the Third Army commander to be used in the event that Germany should refuse to sign the peace treaty. On 20 May, Marshal Foch directed allied commanders to dispatch troops toward Weimar and Berlin in the event the peace treaty was not signed. On 22 May, the Third Army issued its plan of advance, effective 30 May, in view of the impending emergency. On 27 May, Foch informed Pershing that the Supreme War Council desired that allied armies be made ready immediately to resume active operations against the Germans.

On 1 June, the advance GHQ, AEF, at Trier was discontinued. On 16 June, Foch notified Pershing that the allied armies must be ready after 20 June to resume offensive operations, and that preliminary movements were to begin 17 June. On 19 June, Pershing notified Foch that beginning 23 June, the Third Army would occupy the towns of Limburg, Westerburg, Hachenburg, and Altenkirchen, and that III Corps would seize the railroad connecting these towns. On 23 June, the Germans signified their intention to sign the peace treaty, and the contemplated military operations were suspended. On 30 June, Foch and Pershing conferred about the American troops to be left on the Rhine.

=== A separate peace ===
On 1 July, General Pershing notified the War Department that upon Germany's compliance with military conditions imposed upon her (probably within three months after German ratification of the treaty), the American forces in Europe would be reduced to a single regiment of infantry supplemented by necessary auxiliaries. Accordingly, the Third Army was disbanded on 2 July 1919. Its headquarters and all personnel (numbering about 6,800 men) and units under it were thereafter designated American Forces in Germany. This force would remain in Germany, as part of the Occupation of the Rhineland, for over three years. This was due, at least in part, to the fact that the United States, having rejected the Treaty of Versailles, was therefore still "de jure" at war with Germany. This situation remained unresolved until the summer of 1921 when a separate peace treaty was signed.

== Reactivation and the interwar period ==
=== Third Army (I) ===
On 15 October 1921, the Headquarters and Headquarters Company, Third Army, was constituted in the Organized Reserve as one of six field armies to control Army units stationed on home soil. The Third Army was to control forces, primarily Regular Army and National Guard units, in the Seventh, Eighth, and Ninth Corps Areas, comprising the Midwest, Southwest, and Western United States. The Army headquarters was initiated on 25 February 1922 in Omaha, Nebraska, while the Headquarters Company was initiated in April 1924 in St. Louis, Missouri; the Headquarters Company was concurrently relocated to Omaha. On 18 August 1933, the Headquarters Company was withdrawn from the Organized Reserve and allotted to the Regular Army, and the Headquarters was demobilized.

=== Third Army (II) (present Third Army) ===
In a reorganization of field forces in the United States, the Headquarters and Headquarters Company, Third Army, was reconstituted in the Regular Army as one of four field armies to control the units of the U.S. Army that were stationed on home soil. The Headquarters was organized on 15 September 1932 in Houston, Texas, although the Headquarters Company was not activated until 23 November 1940. The responsibility of the Third Army was overseeing the training and mobilization plans of its assigned units, and developing contingency defense plans for the Southern United States.

==== Commanders ====
- Major General Edwin B. Winans, 15 September 1932 – 30 September 1933
- Major General Johnson Hagood, 3 October 1933 – 27 February 1936
- Major General Frank Parker, 8 April – 30 September 1936
- Major General George Van Horn Moseley, 1 October 1936 – 30 September 1938
- Lieutenant General Stanley D. Embick, 7 October 1938 – 28 September 1940
- Lieutenant General Herbert J. Brees, 28 September 1940 – 15 May 1941
- Lieutenant General Walter Krueger, 16 May 1941 – 16 February 1943

== World War II ==
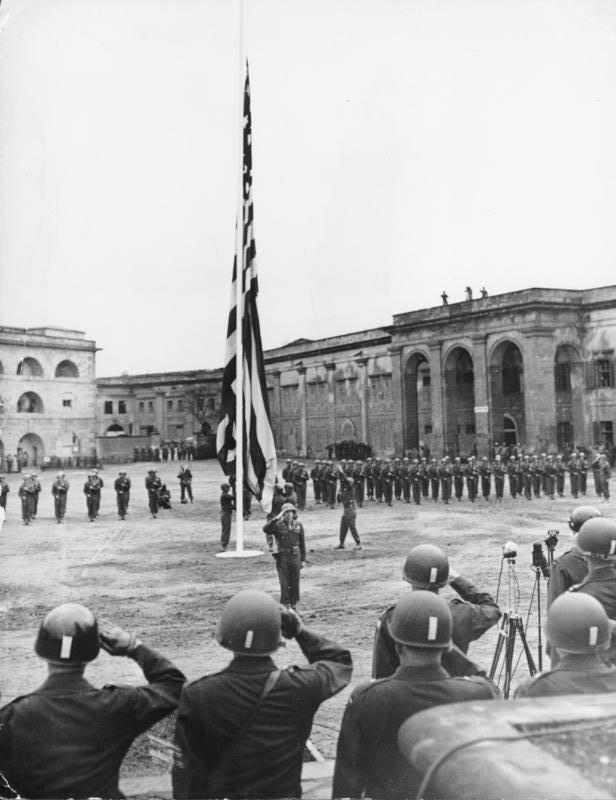
American flag over Festung Ehrenbreitstein after the occupation of Koblenz by the Third Army, 1945

As a result of mobilization, the Third Army initially helped take on the role of training some of the huge numbers of Army recruits that the draft was bringing in. Lieutenant General Walter Krueger, later to gain fame for his command of Sixth Army during operations in the Pacific, commanded Third Army from May 1941 until February 1943. Under his leadership, the basis of the Army's later success as a combat formation was laid. Krueger was succeeded by Lieutenant General Courtney Hodges who led the Army for the rest of 1943. The news that many had expected came in December 1943 and the Third Army was shipped from the United States to the United Kingdom.

Hodges was transferred to command of the First Army, while Third Army did not take part in the initial stages of Operation Overlord. However, when it did take the field, it was led by George S. Patton. When Third Army was moved to France, it was just after formations under the command of Omar Bradley had achieved the breakout from Normandy. Third Army followed up on that success and began a great dash across France, ultimately out-running its supply lines which halted it near the German border.

After a period of consolidation, Third Army was ready to go on the offensive again. However, the Germans then launched their last great offensive of the war – the Battle of the Bulge. This battle was an attempt to repeat the decisive breakthrough of 1940. However, in 1944, the Germans were doomed to failure. Their own logistical problems surfaced, and they ground to a halt. Nevertheless, they had broken the U.S. front, and it took a great effort to reduce the resulting salient. In one of the great moves of the war, Patton heeded the advice of his Intelligence Officer, Oscar Koch, and planned to aid First Army if required. When the German offensive commenced, Patton was prepared to turn Third Army's axis of advance ninety degrees and advance north to the southern flank of the German forces. The German salient was reduced by the end of January 1945, and the remainder of the process of closing up to the Rhine could be completed. Some vicious fighting took place, but by April there was but one great natural barrier between Third Army and the heart of Germany. Unlike in 1918, the crossing of the Rhine was opposed. However, the bridgehead was won, and Third Army embarked on another great eastward dash. It reached Austria and in May liberated the Mauthausen-Gusen concentration camps complex. Its forces ended up in Czechoslovakia, the furthest east of any American units where they liberated Plzeň (Pilsen) on May 6th 1945.

The Third Army After Action of May 1945 states that the Third Army captured 765,483 prisoners of war, with an additional 515,205 of the enemy already held in corps and divisional level POW camps processed between 9 May and 13 May 1945, for a total of 1,280,688 POWs, and that, additionally, Third Army forces killed 144,500 enemy soldiers and wounded 386,200, for a total of 1,811,388 in enemy losses. Fuller's review of Third Army records differs only in the number of enemy killed and wounded, stating that between 1 August 1944 and 9 May 1945, 47,500 of the enemy were killed, 115,700 wounded, and 1,280,688 captured. Fuller's combined total of enemy losses is 1,443,888 enemy killed, wounded, or captured by the Third Army. The Third Army suffered 16,596 killed, 96,241 wounded, and 26,809 missing in action for a total of 139,646 casualties according to the aforementioned After Action Report of May 1945. According to Fuller, the Third Army lost 27,104 killed and 86,267 wounded. There were 18,957 injuries of all kinds and 28,237 men listed as missing in action. Including 127 men captured by the enemy, total casualties of the Third Army were 160,692 in 281 continuous days of operations. Fuller points out that the ratio of German troop deaths to American deaths in the Third Army operating area was 1.75:1.

=== German occupation ===
In the immediate postwar occupation, Army G-2 briefly hosted the Fedden Mission.

Third Army remained in Germany until recalled to the United States again in 1947. When back in the United States, its duties were much the same as those of the 1930s, supervising training for units in the United States. The Korean War saw a repeat of the earlier World War II training duties. The previous state districts (like the Georgia Army District) were abolished in 1958. On November 1 that year, the Army reactivated the IV and XII United States Army Corps as permanent, non-tactical regional headquarters under the Third Army. The two corps supervised the 81st and 108th Divisions and the 87th Maneuver Area Command. IV Corps units in Alabama transferred to the new 121st Army Reserve Command after the corps were inactivated in 1968.

The Third Army remained responsible for supervising Reserve Component training until 1974, when a new major headquarters, that of United States Army Forces Command, was activated to take on much of CONARC's duties. Third Army was thus inactivated, and it remained so for the better part of a decade.

== ARCENT ==
On 3 December 1982, a special ceremony was held at Fort McPherson to mark the return to Active Army status of Headquarters, Third U.S. Army under the command of Lieutenant General M. Collier Ross. Guests at the event included former Third Army Commanders, General (Retired) Herbert B. Powell and Lieutenant General (Retired) Louis W. Truman.

The new headquarters was established at Fort McPherson, and its new mission was to serve as the Army component in a unified command, the United States Central Command, which has responsibility over a vast overseas area covering parts of Africa, Asia, and the Persian Gulf.

For its part, Third Army could draw upon a reservoir of Army units, and became responsible for planning, exercising, and rapidly deploying these units in crisis situations.

== Operation Desert Shield and Operation Desert Storm ==
It was not until 1990 that Third Army returned to combat. Saddam Hussein invaded Kuwait in August 1990, and American forces were immediately dispatched to Saudi Arabia to protect the Saudi oil fields. At first, XVIII Airborne Corps made up the majority of the force; enough to ensure that the Iraqis could not invade Saudi Arabia. However, in November 1990, massive reinforcements were announced in the form of VII Corps from Germany. This deployment marked the largest use of armored formations by the U.S. since World War II, and thus it was fitting that Patton's old command, Third Army, should have control of the battle. Army Forces Central Command supervised the two corps, but Schwarzkopf retained in his own hands the task of Land Component Commander, thus meaning that he dealt directly with both corps frequently. By the opening of hostilities, XVIII Corps had three American and one French division and VII Corps four American and one British division under command, thus giving Third Army a total of nine divisions, plus the armored cavalry regiments attached to both corps.

Third Army, commanded by Lieutenant General John J. Yeosock, was the main striking force in Operation Desert Storm. Its units were on the left flank of the attacking force and swept into southern Iraq. They then turned east and engaged the Iraqi Republican Guard in fierce combat. Much of that force was destroyed. In terms of its immediate aims, the Persian Gulf War was a stunning success. The Iraqis were ejected from Kuwait and their forces were thoroughly mauled.

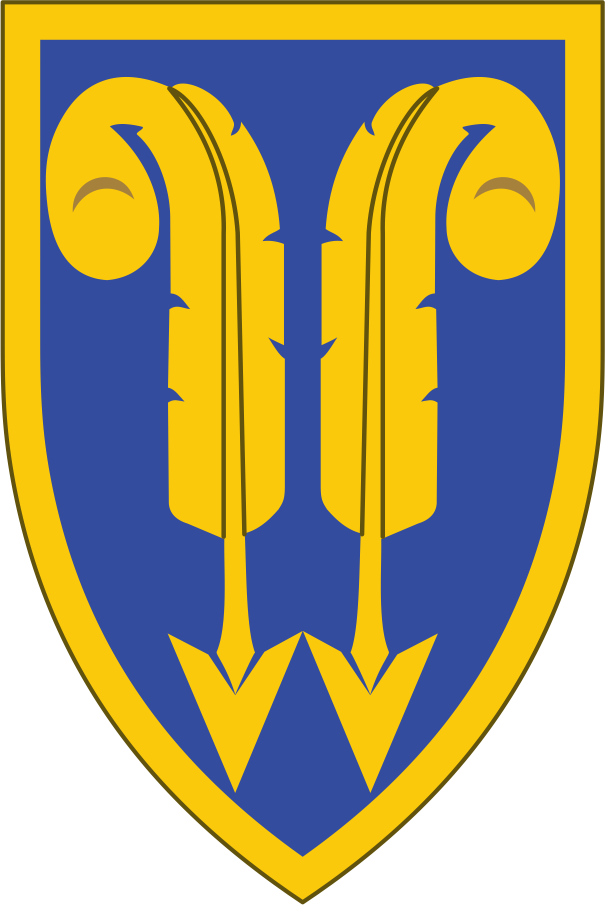
Shoulder Sleeve Insignia of 22nd Support Command

During the crisis, the 22nd Support Command served as the primary Logistics and Combat Service Support organization for ARCENT during the Operation Desert Shield, Operation Desert Storm and Operation Desert Farewell portions of the operation. The Command was activated as the ARCENT SUPCOM (Provisional) on 19 August 1990, but had been in operation since 10 August 1990. The ARCENT SUPCOM (PROV) was redesignated the 22nd Support Command on 16 December 1990. During the conflict, the commander was Major General, and then Lieutenant General William 'Gus' Pagonis. The HHC of the 22nd Command received a Meritorious Unit Commendation for the period August 1990- April 1991. When the Command was disestablished following Operation Desert Farewell, it was succeeded by the 1st Area Support Group.

== Supporting allies ==
Third Army/ARCENT remained engaged in the Middle East after the end of the Persian Gulf War with various operations to enforce the cease fire.

=== Operation Vigilant Warrior ===
In October 1994, ARCENT was again called upon to command, control, and deploy U.S. Army forces to Kuwait during Operation Vigilant Warrior.

The operation was initiated in response to Saddam Hussein's saber rattling and posturing of Iraqi military forces along the Iraqi-Kuwaiti border. This act of aggression threatened to upset the delicate balance of peace in the region.

ARCENT's rapid generation and deployment of a Army force demonstrated U.S. resolve and commitment to its friends and allies in the region.

=== Operation Vigilant Sentinel ===
Less than one year later, Saddam Hussein would again deploy Iraqi forces close to its border with Kuwait. In August, Third Army/ARCENT provided command and control for a rapid deployment of a heavy brigade task force. The operation was described by Third Army as having convinced Hussein to withdraw his forces from the Kuwaiti border. Once more, Iraqi threats were met while ARCENT simultaneously conducted a major training exercise in Egypt, "Exercise Bright Star 95," involving forces from 6 other states. The exercise validated critical procedures for deployment, particularly the off-loading of equipment from floating prepositioning ships and its distribution to arriving soldiers. The deployment of a "Fly-Away Package" of key contingency staff also validated procedures for a rapidly deployed command and control group able to conduct combat operations immediately upon arrival.

=== Operation Desert Strike ===
In September 1996, it was alleged that Iraq violated United Nations sanctions by deploying forces north of the 36th Parallel and attacking ethnic Kurds in Northern Iraq. In response to Hussein's refusal to withdraw his forces, the U.S. launched cruise missile strikes against selected military targets inside Iraq. A heavy brigade task force, 2nd Brigade, 1st Cavalry Division, was deployed to Kuwait under the command of Third Army/ARCENT as follow on forces to an already deployed Task Force (Task Force Headhunter, 1/9th and 1/12th Cavalry) to deter potential retaliatory attacks on Kuwait. The Brigade Task Force was supported by elements of the United States Marines, British Royal Marines and the Kuwaiti Liberation Brigade. Hussein soon capitulated, withdrawing his military forces south of the 36th Parallel.

=== Operation Desert Thunder I ===
When Saddam Hussein blocked United Nations weapons inspections, tested the resolve of coalition commitment by violating the no-fly zone, and publicly threatened to mimic earlier Soviet successes by shooting down U2 reconnaissance over-flights in the Fall of 1997, CENTCOM responded with a land, sea, and air strike force of more than 35,000 U.S. and coalition forces. In support of this powerful multi-service, multinational ground force, General Anthony C. Zinni, Commander-in-Chief, CENTCOM, established a permanent Coalition/ Joint Task Force (C/JTF), headquartered at Camp Doha, Kuwait, and commanded by Lieutenant General Tommy R. Franks, Commanding General, Third Army/ARCENT.

In addition to the U.S. and coalition forces already in Kuwait, a brigade task force from 3d Infantry Division, Fort Stewart, Georgia, rapidly deployed to Kuwait. Departing from Hunter Army Airfield, the brigade task force deployed 4,000 personnel and 2,900 short tons of equipment on 120 aircraft. Within 15 hours of landing at Kuwait City International Airport, the unit had drawn prepositioned equipment and was in battle positions in the desert. On 28 February, Combined Joint Task Force Kuwait (C/JTF-K) was prepared to defend Kuwait with a ground force strength of more than 9,000 personnel.

Argentina, Australia, Canada, Czech Republic, Hungary, New Zealand, Poland, Romania, the United Kingdom, and Kuwait rounded out the C/JTF by providing liaison teams, aircraft support, special operations elements, chemical/biological defense, base defense units, MASH units, and medical personnel.

Added to forces on the ground was equipment for two more brigades (one Army and one Marine) afloat in the Persian Gulf with the Maritime Preposition Force. These ships were poised to link up with soldiers and Marines who would draw their equipment and begin combat operations if required. Attack air provided by Navy, Air Force, and Coalition assets rounded out this formidable force.

This was the largest multinational force assembled in Southwest Asia since the conclusion of the Persian Gulf War.

According to the Third Army, the demonstrated capability to quickly deploy combat forces from around the world deterred Iraqi aggression and helped reinstate compliance with the UN Weapons Inspection Program. In November 1998, when the work of the UN inspectors was again interrupted, Third Army quickly returned to the Persian Gulf to convince Saddam that the United States stood ready to enforce the terms of the cease-fire.

=== Operation Desert Thunder II ===
As Saddam Hussein violated United Nations sanctions and threatened regional stability, the United States began deploying to Kuwait and preparing for combat operations. Combined/Joint Task Force-Kuwait, in place since Desert Thunder I, played a key role in the rapid deployment, reception, staging, onward movement, and integration of forces.

Units deploying to Kuwait included advance parties from the 3d Infantry Division and the 32d Army Air and Missile Defense Command (AAMDC), personnel from the Theater Support Command (TSC), Air Support Operations Center (ASOC), and Marine forces. In addition, the redeployment of the Marine Expeditionary Unit (MEU) in the Persian Gulf was placed on hold and a second MEU was ordered to the Persian Gulf as reinforcement.

While forces were deploying to the Persian Gulf region, United Nations Secretary-General Kofi Annan flew to Baghdad to meet with Saddam Hussein.

Following negotiations, Saddam Hussein agreed to allow uninterrupted resumption of United Nations weapons inspections. In mid-Nov, as the crisis defused, there were 2,300 personnel deployed to Kuwait in support of C/JTF-Kuwait.

=== Operation Desert Fox ===
When Iraqi aircraft began challenging the established no-fly zones, and Iraqi air defense systems fired on allied aircraft in December 1998, US and UK forces responded with a massive display of firepower.

Allied air force and navy aircraft, and cruise missiles engaged command and control, communications, and selected Republican Guards targets on the morning of 16 December. These concentrated attacks against Iraqi targets continued until the early morning of 19 December.

During the campaign, Third Army again deployed forces to defend Kuwait, and to reassure allies in the Persian Gulf region.

By late December, C/JTF-Kuwait consisted of approximately 6,000 personnel, including the 31st Marine Expeditionary Unit.

Brigadier General Stanley A. McChrystal served as assistant division commander (operations) of the 82nd Airborne Division from June 2000 to June 2001, including duty as Commander, Coalition/Joint Task Force Kuwait, in Camp Doha, Kuwait.

== Operation Iraqi Freedom ==
Third Army was deployed to attack Iraq again in early 2003. The forces it had under its command for the 2003 invasion of Iraq were much smaller in numbers than those it had commanded twelve years before. It had V Corps as its main striking force, with only two complete divisions and an airborne brigade under that command. There was also I Marine Expeditionary Force, controlling a further two divisions and a brigade. However, the opposing Iraqi forces were very weak, and technologically inferior. It took six weeks to defeat Iraq, along with 3rd Infantry Division, the heavy mech/armor component of XVIII Airborne Corps.

The aftermath of the campaign saw the establishment of Combined Joint Task Force 7 headquartered in Baghdad, responsible to Central Command. Third Army was thus contributing to a third occupation within one hundred years.

== Role ==
As a result of July 2011 BRAC relocations, Third U.S. Army is headquartered at Shaw Air Force Base, South Carolina with a forward element at Camp Arifjan, Kuwait. Administratively called ARCENT again, it continues to serve as the Army Component Command for CENTCOM, and the forward element is serving as the Coalition Forces Land Component Command (CFLCC). It provides support and services to theater ARFOR commands, as well as directed Army support to other services.

Previously, in Saudi Arabia, its bases include King Abdul Aziz Air Base, King Fahad Air Base, King Khalid Air Base, Eskan Village Air Base and Riyadh Air Base. The Army moved all its bases and equipment to Al Udeid Air Base, Qatar in 2003.

Focusing primarily on the Middle East, Central Command and Third Army's area of responsibility (AOR) is a large and complex region. It stretches from the Central Asian States to the Horn of Africa. The AOR encompasses an area of approximately 6,500,000 square miles (17,000,000 km^{2}) consisting of 27 countries populated by over 650 million people speaking 12 major languages and representing seven major religions. Within this strategically important region lay the historical crossroads of three continents, the majority of the world's oil and natural gas reserves, and the primary maritime link between Europe and Asia. Resources, differing geography, religious influences, and historical conflict have shaped this region for centuries and continue to do so today.

In keeping with US national security strategy, Third Army supports U.S. Central Command through a theater security cooperation strategy that encompasses the four fundamentals of the National Military Strategy. Third Army maintains a continued forward presence, conducts joint and coalition exercises throughout the region, provides humanitarian assistance when needed, develops close partnerships with responsible nations, assists in demining efforts, and provides support to other military service components. Third Army is prepared to rapidly respond by developing and executing war plans and contingency missions as required. This strategy provides the President with a wide range of options to deter aggression and coercion from a forward presence posture, and to decisively defeat any adversary if deterrence fails across the full spectrum of conflict.

== Organization ==
Current organization of the command is as follows;

- United States Army Central Command Headquarters
  - Commanding General, Lieutenant General Kevin C. Leahy
  - Deputy Commanding General, Major General Henry S. Dixon
  - Chief of Staff, Colonel Jeremy A. Bartel
  - Command Sergeant Major, Eric R. McCray
- 160th Signal Brigade
- 1st Theater Sustainment Command
- 4th Battlefield Coordination Detachment, 513th Military Intelligence Brigade
- Task Force Spartan – Regular, National Guard, and Reserve
- Area Support Group, Jordan
- Area Support Group, Kuwait
- Combined Joint Task Force – Operation Inherent Resolve

== Lineage and honors ==
=== Lineage ===
Organized 7–15 November 1918 in the Regular Army in France as Headquarters and Headquarters Troop, Third Army

Demobilized 2 July 1919 in Germany

Reconstituted 9 August 1932 in the Regular Army as Headquarters and Headquarters Company, Third Army

Headquarters activated 1 October 1933 at Fort Sam Houston, Texas

Headquarters Company activated 23 November 1940 at Fort Sam Houston, Texas

Redesignated 1 January 1957 as Headquarters and Headquarters Company, Third United States Army

Inactivated 1 October 1973 at Fort McPherson, Georgia

Activated 1 December 1982 at Fort McPherson, Georgia

Reorganized and redesignated 16 June 2006 as Headquarters, United States Army Central, to consist of Main Command Post, Operational Command Post, and Special Troops Battalion (Special Troops Battalion – hereafter separate lineage)

=== Campaign participation credit ===
- World War II
  - Normandy
  - Northern France
  - Rhineland
  - Ardennes-Alsace
  - Central Europe
- Southwest Asia
  - Defense of Saudi Arabia
  - Liberation and Defense of Kuwait
  - Cease-Fire

War on Terrorism

- Afghanistan
  - Liberation of Afghanistan
  - Consolidation I
- Iraq
  - Liberation of Iraq
  - Transition of Iraq

(Additional campaigns to be determined)

== Decorations ==
- Meritorious Unit Commendation (Army), Streamer embroidered SOUTHWEST ASIA 1990-1991
- Meritorious Unit Commendation (Army), Streamer embroidered CENTRAL AND SOUTHWEST ASIA 2008
- Meritorious Unit Commendation (Army), Streamer embroidered SOUTHWEST ASIA 2009-2010
- Army Superior Unit Award, Streamer embroidered 2001-2004

== Shoulder Sleeve Insignia ==
Shoulder Sleeve Insignia, United States Army Central

=== Description/Blazon ===
On a blue disc 2 1/4 inches (5.7 cm) in diameter a white letter "A" with members 1/8 inch (0.32 cm) wide within a red circle 2 inches (5.1 cm) in diameter and 3/16 inch (0.48 cm) in width.

=== Background ===
The shoulder sleeve insignia was originally approved for Third Army on 20 December 1922. It was redesignated for Third United States Army on 10 November 1960. The insignia was redesignated for US Army Central on 29 August 2006. (TIOH Drawing Number A-1-3)

== Combat Service Identification Badge ==
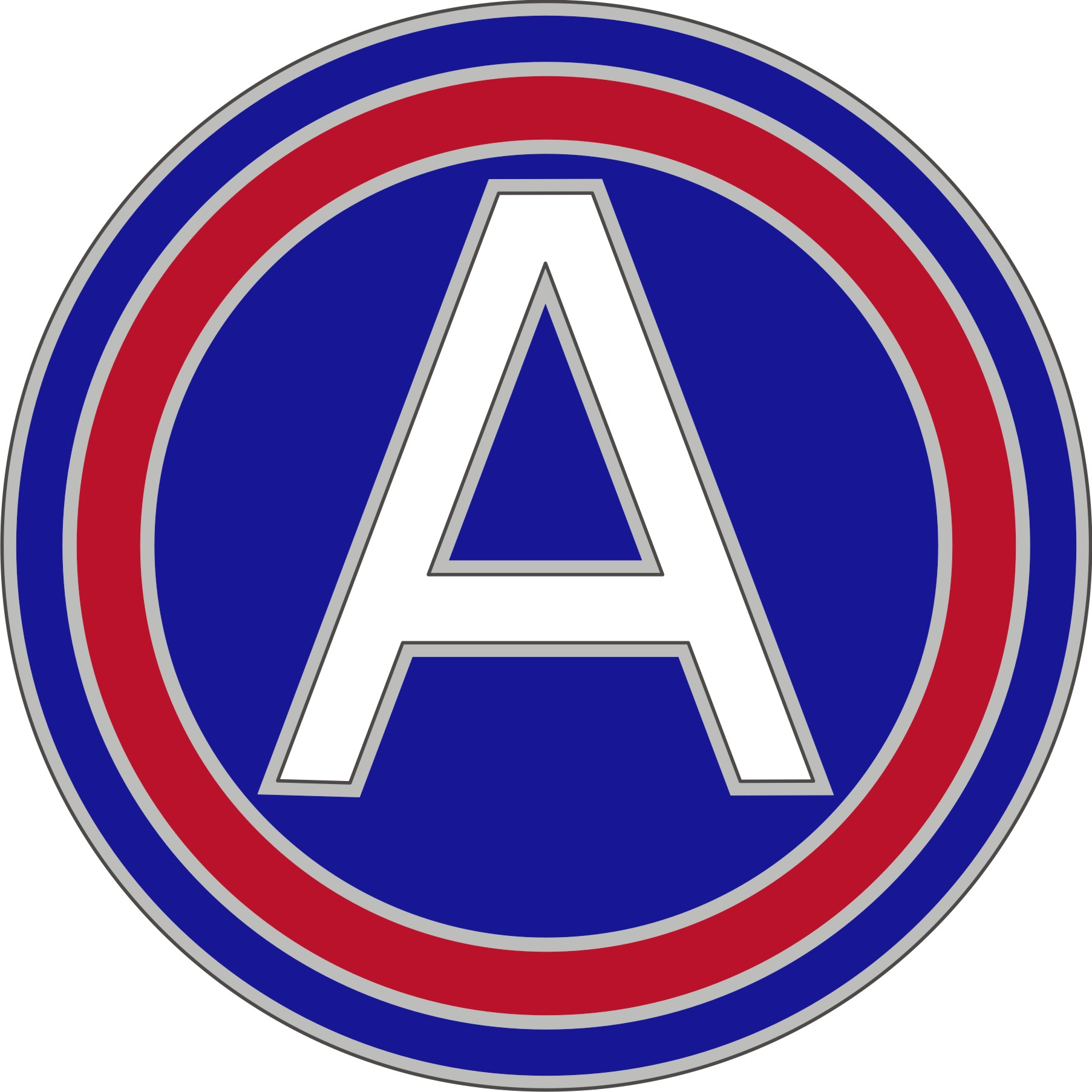
Combat Service Identification Badge, United States Army Central

=== Description/Blazon ===
A silver color metal and enamel device 2 inches (5.1 cm) in diameter consisting of a design similar to the shoulder sleeve insignia.

== Distinctive unit insignia ==
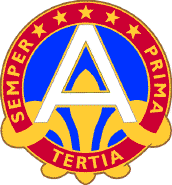
Distinctive Unit Insignia, United States Army Central

=== Description/Blazon ===
A gold color metal and enamel device 1 3/16 inches (3.0 cm) in height overall consisting of a blue disc with a red border, the blue area bearing throughout a white capital letter "A" (as depicted on the authorized shoulder sleeve insignia for US Army Central) in front of in base a gold stylized fleur-de-lis, the center petal of the fleur-de-lis extending behind and above the cross bar of the letter "A" and behind and below the red border and the tops of the two outer petals extending under, downward and over the red border and terminating at and conjoined with the feet of the letter "A" and the lower ends extending behind and below the red border which bears at top five gold five-pointed stars and the inscription "TERTIA SEMPER PRIMA" in gold letters, the word "TERTIA" in base and between the outer petals of the fleur-de-lis and the stars, the word "SEMPER" on the left and the word "PRIMA" on the right.

=== Symbolism ===
The design is based on the authorized shoulder sleeve insignia of US Army Central (formerly United States Third Army). The fleur-de-lis in base alludes to the initial activation of the Headquarters, Third Army, at Ligny-en-Barrois, France, 15 November 1918. The five stars refer to the five campaigns Normandy, Northern France, Rhineland, Ardennes-Alsace and Central Europe, World War II in which the Third United States Army participated. The motto reflects the Third Army's constant readiness.

=== Background ===
The distinctive unit insignia was originally approved for Third United States Army on 10 October 1968. It was redesignated for US Army Central with the description updated and symbolism revised on 29 August 2006.

== Commanding generals ==
Note – rank shown is the highest rank held while commanding the Third Army.

- LTG Kevin C. Leahy (2026–present)
- LTG Patrick D. Frank (2022–2026)
- LTG Ronald P. Clark (2021–2022)
- LTG Terry R. Ferrell (2019–2021)
- LTG Michael X. Garrett (2015–19)
- LTG James L. Terry (2013–15)
- LTG Vincent K. Brooks (2011–13)
- LTG William G. Webster (2009–11)
- LTG James J. Lovelace (2007–09)
- LTG R. Steven Whitcomb (2004–07)
- LTG David D. McKiernan (2002–04)
- LTG Paul T. Mikolashek (2000–02)
- LTG Tommy Franks (1997–2000)
- MG Robert Ivany (1997)
- LTG Steven L. Arnold (1994–97)
- LTG James R. Ellis (1992–94)
- LTG John J. Yeosock (1989–92)
- LTG Andrew Chambers (1987–89)
- LTG Theodore G. Jenes Jr. (1984–87)
- LTG William J. Livsey (1983–84)
- LTG M. Collier Ross (1982–83)
- Unit inactivated (1973–82)
- MG Warren Bennett (1973)
- LTG Melvin Zais (1972–73)
- LTG Albert O. Connor (1969–72)
- LTG John L. Throckmorton (1967–69)
- LTG Louis W. Truman (1965–67)
- MG William C. Bullock (1965) (Acting)
- LTG Charles W. G. Rich (1964–65)
- LTG John W. Bowen (1964) (Acting)
- LTG Albert Watson II (1963–64)
- LTG Hamilton H. Howze (1962–63) (Acting)
- LTG Thomas J. H. Trapnell (1961–62)
- LTG Paul D. Adams (1960–61)
- LTG Thomas J. H. Trapnell (1960)
- LTG Herbert B. Powell (1960)
- LTG Robert F. Sink (1960) (Acting)
- LTG Clark L. Ruffner (1958–60)
- LTG Thomas F. Hickey (1955–58)
- LTG Alexander Bolling (1952–55)
- MG William A. Beiderlinden (1952)
- GEN John R. Hodge (1950–52)
- LTG Alvan Cullom Gillem Jr. (1947–50)
- LTG Edward H. Brooks (1947) (Acting)
- LTG Oscar Griswold (1947) (Interim)
- MG Ernest N. Harmon (1947) (Interim)
- LTG Geoffrey Keyes (1946–47)
- LTG Lucian K. Truscott Jr. (October 1945 – April 1946)
- GEN George S. Patton Jr. (January 1944 – October 1945)
- LTG Courtney Hodges (May 1943 – January 1944)
- LTG Walter Krueger (May 1941 – May 1943)
- LTG Herbert J. Brees (1940–41)
- LTG Stanley D. Embick (1938–40)
- MG George V. H. Moseley (1936–38)
- MG Frank Parker (1936)
- MG Johnson Hagood (1933–36)
- MG Edwin B. Winans (1932–33)
- Unit inactivated (1919–32)
- LTG Hunter Liggett (May 1919 – July 1919)
- MG Joseph T. Dickman (November 1918 – April 1919)

== Deputy Commanding Generals ==
1. MG Henry S. Dixon (DCG) (2023- Present)
2. MG Wendul G. Hagler II (DCG (2021–2023)
3. MG Douglas Crissman (DCG) (2020–2021)
4. MG David Hill (DCG) (2018–2020)
5. MG Terrence J. McKenrick (DCG)(2017–2018)
6. MG Donnie Walker. (DCG-Sustainment) (2017–present)
7. MG William B. Hickman (DCG-Operations) (2015–2017)
8. MG Paul C Hurley Jr. (DCG-Sustainment) (2015–2017)
9. MG Dana J.H. Pittard (DCG-Operations) (2013–15)
10. MG Kurt J. Stein (DCG-Sustainment) (2012–15)
11. MG Gary Cheek (2011–13)
12. MG Peter Vangjel (2009–11)
13. MG Charles A. Anderson (2008–09)
14. MG Dennis E. Hardy (2006–08)
15. MG James A. Kelley (2005–06)
16. MG Gary D. Speer (2004–05)
17. MG Stephen M. Speakes ( )
18. MG Antonio M. Taguba ( )
19. MG Henry Stratman ( )
20. MG William G. Webster (2002–03)
21. MG Warren C. Edwards (1999–2002)
22. MG Charles C. Campbell (1998–99)

== Command Sergeants Major ==
1. CSM Eric R. McCray (2024–Present)
2. CSM Jacinto Garza (2021–2024)
3. CSM Brian Hester (2019–2021)
4. CSM Joseph Cornelison (2018–2019)
5. CSM Eric C. Dostie (2016–2018)
6. CSM Ronnie R. Kelley (2014–16)
7. CSM Stephan Frennier (2011–14)
8. CSM John D. Fourhman (2008–11)
9. CSM Franklin G. Ashe (2005–08)
10. CSM Julian A. Kellman (2004–05)
11. CSM John D. Sparks (2002–04)
12. CSM Vincent M. Myers (2000–02)
13. CSM Dwight J. Brown (2000)
14. CSM Robert T. Hall (1996–2000)
15. CSM Edward E. Smith (1988–93)

== Chiefs of Staff ==
1. BG Matthew L. Eichburg (2021– )
2. BG Robert B. Davis (2020–2021)
3. BG Jeffrey P. Van (2019–2020)
4. BG James H. Raymer (2017–2019)
5. BG Viet Xuan Luong (2016–17)
6. BG David P. Glaser (2014–16)
7. BG Charles L. Taylor (2012–14)
8. BG David Bishop (2011–12)
9. BG Stephen Twitty (2010–11)
10. COL Kevin M. Batule (2008–10)
11. COL William Norman (2006–08)
12. COL Richard P. McEvoy (2004–06)
13. COL John L. Della Jacono (2003–04)
14. MG Robert Blackman (2002–03)
15. COL John L. Della Jacono (2002)
16. COL Mark S. Wentlent (2000–02)
17. COL Peter J. Deperro (1997–2000)
18. MG Hobart R. Gay (1944–45)
19. MG Hugh J. Gaffey (1944)
20. BG Dwight D. Eisenhower (1941)
21. BG Malin Craig (1918–19)
