= M. Collier Ross =

United States Army general

Marion Collier Ross
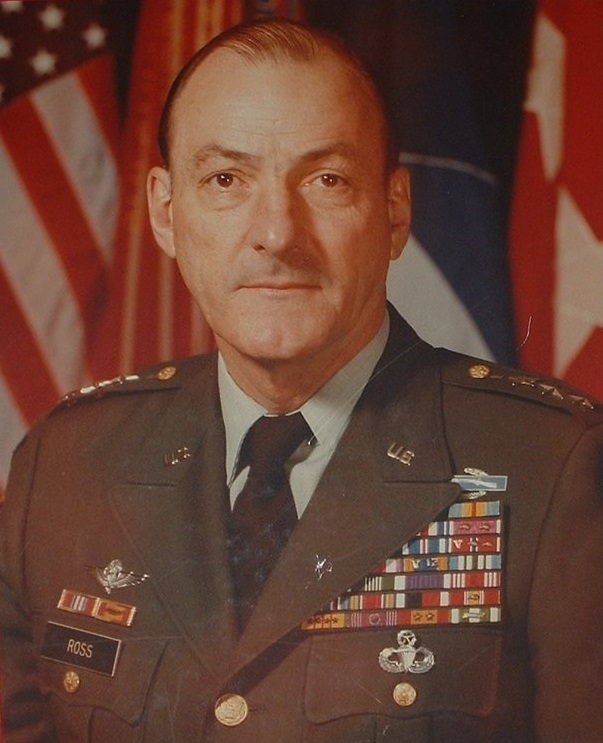
- Ross as deputy commander of United States Forces Command, circa 1980.
- Born: January 24, 1927; Moberly, Missouri
- Died: February 8, 2003 (aged 76); Atlanta, Georgia
- Military career
- Allegiance: United States
- Branch: United States Army
- Service years: 1944-1945; 1949-1983
- Rank: Lieutenant General
- Commands: Third United States Army; I Corps; 173d Airborne Brigade
- Conflicts: World War II; Vietnam War
- Awards: Defense Distinguished Service Medal; Army Distinguished Service Medal; Silver Star; Legion of Merit (3); Distinguished Flying Cross; Bronze Star Medal (3); Purple Heart

Marion Collier Ross (January 24, 1927 – February 8, 2003) was a lieutenant general in the United States Army. He is a former commander of the I Corps at Fort Lewis, a post which he served from 1978 to 1979. He was also Deputy Commanding General of the United States Army Forces Command, and Commander, Third United States Army, retiring in 1983. He married Ann Eleanor Sylvester at Fort Benning in 1950. Ross died in 2003 and is interred at Fort Benning.

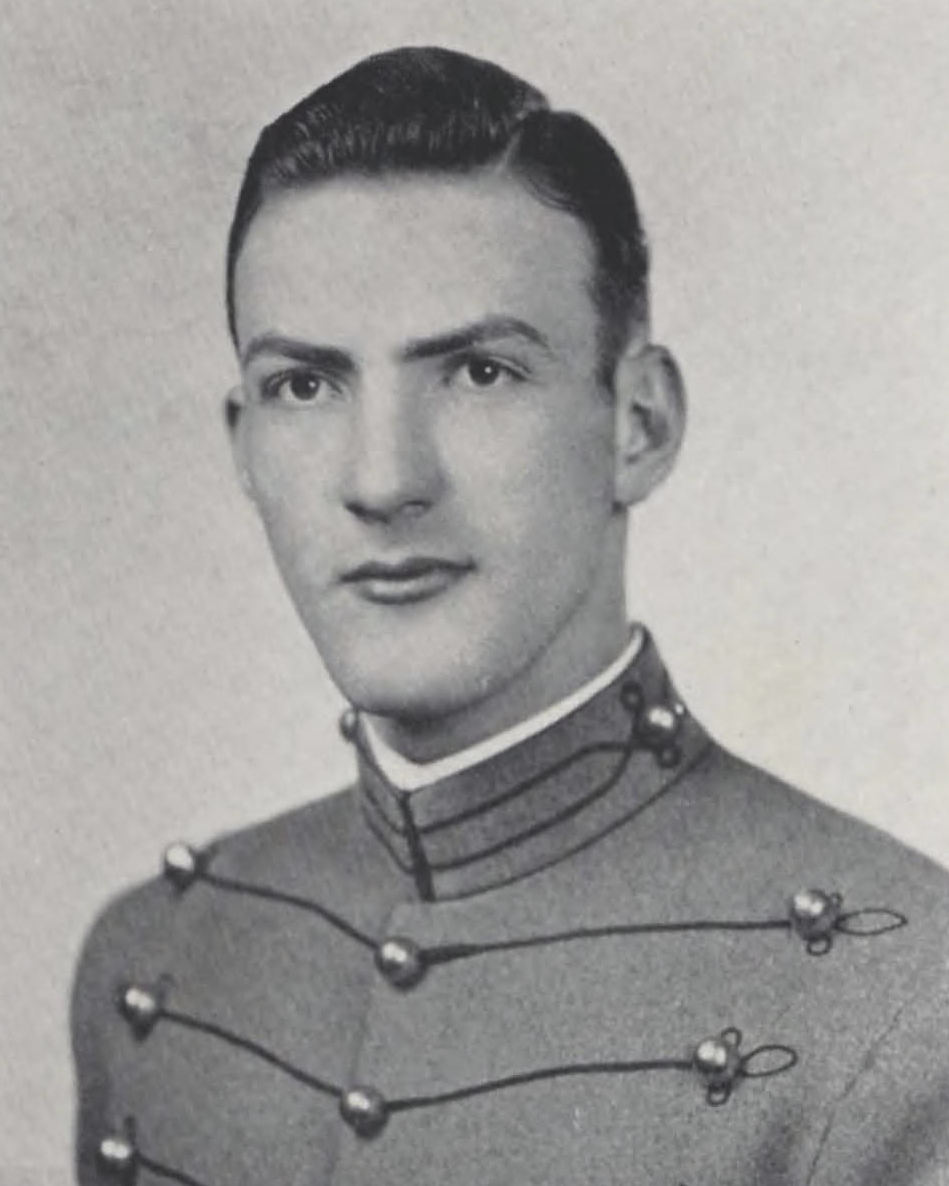
Ross as a United States Military Academy cadet c. 1949
