= John Q. Henion =

US Army lieutenant general

- Henion as commander of U.S. Army Japan in 1977
- Born: 3 October 1922; San Antonio, Texas, US
- Died: 31 May 1983 (aged 60); Austin, Texas, US
- Burial place: Fort Sam Houston National Cemetery
- Education: Municipal University of Omaha; United States Army Command and General Staff College; National War College
- Spouse: Helen Jean Mickelsen (m. 1947–1983)
- Children: 4
- Military career
- Service: United States Army
- Service years: 1942–1980
- Rank: Lieutenant General
- Service number: 038206
- Unit: US Army Infantry Branch
- Commands: 3rd Armored Rifle Battalion, 3rd Armored Division; 3rd Infantry Brigade, 2nd Infantry Division; Combat Operations and Analysis Branch, Organization of the Joint Chiefs of Staff; Director of Training, Military Assistance Command, Vietnam; United States Army Recruiting Command; 9th Infantry Division; United States Army Japan
- Conflicts: World War II; Allied-occupied Germany; Occupation of Japan; Korean War; Vietnam War
- Awards: Army Distinguished Service Medal; Legion of Merit; Distinguished Flying Cross; Bronze Star Medal; Complete List

John Q. Henion (3 October 1922 – 31 May 1983) was a career officer in the United States Army. A veteran of World War II, the Korean War, and the Vietnam War, he served from 1942 to 1980 and attained the rank of lieutenant general. Henion's commands included the United States Army Recruiting Command, 9th Infantry Division, and United States Army Japan, and his awards included the Army Distinguished Service Medal, Legion of Merit, Distinguished Flying Cross, and Bronze Star Medal.

== Early life and start of career ==
John Quint Henion was born at Fort Sam Houston in San Antonio, Texas on 3 October 1922, a son of Karl Eugene Henion, a career United States Army officer who retired as a colonel, and Elizabeth (Schmitt) Henion. He was raised and educated on army bases in the US and overseas as the Henion family relocated for his father's career, graduated from Seattle's Roosevelt High School, and attended the University of Washington from 1940 to 1943. While in college, he participated in the Reserve Officers' Training Corps. In May 1942, he enlisted in the Organized Reserve Corps and in 1943, Henion and the majority of his ROTC class left college and joined the army for World War II. Henion attended basic training at Camp Croft, South Carolina. He was selected for Officer Candidate School at Fort Benning, Georgia and in May 1944 he received his commission as a second lieutenant of Infantry.

After receiving his commission, Henion's was assigned as a platoon leader with the 76th Infantry Division at Fort McCoy, Wisconsin. In August 1944, he was posted to the V Corps in Belgium, where he was assigned to duty with the corps' headquarters company. From 1945 to 1947, he served at the Fifteenth United States Army headquarters in Bad Neuenahr-Ahrweiler during Allied-occupied Germany, including postings as aide-de-camp and assistant chief of staff for logistics (G-4). His final assignment before returning to the United States was assistant secretary of the general staff for the United States Forces, European Theater headquarters in Frankfurt, Germany.

=== Family ===
In March 1947, Henion married Helen Jean Mickelsen, the daughter of Lieutenant General Stanley R. Mickelsen. They were married until his death and were the parents of four children.

== Continued career ==
After his return to the US, Henion was assigned to Fort Benning's 325th Infantry Regiment, a unit of the 82nd Airborne Division, with which he served as a platoon leader and company commander. In 1950, he joined the 3rd Infantry Division, with which he performed Occupation of Japan and Korean War duty as operations officer and executive officer of 1st Battalion, 15th Infantry. In 1952, he completed the Infantry Officer Advanced Course at Fort Benning, after which he was assigned to the Office of the Chief of Staff of the United States Army as assistant secretary of the general staff from 1953 to 1957. From 1957 to 1958, Henion was a student at Fort Leavenworth's United States Army Command and General Staff College, after which he remained at the school as a member of the faculty. As part of a program that enabled faculty members to finish college, he attended the Municipal University of Omaha while assigned to Fort Leavenworth, and in 1962 he received his Bachelor of General Education degree.

From 1962 to 1963, Henion was assigned to the headquarters of United States Army Europe as a plans officer in the directorate of the deputy chief of staff for personnel (G-1). From 1963 to 1964, he commanded 3rd Armored Rifle Battalion, 3rd Armored Division in West Germany, where he served until 1964. From 1964 to 1966, he served as the 3rd Armored Division's plans, operations, and training officer (G-3). In 1966, Henion received promotion to colonel and was selected to attend the National War College in Washington, DC. After graduation, he was posted to South Korea and assigned to command 3rd Infantry Brigade, 2nd Infantry Division. In 1968, he was assigned to the Organization of the Joint Chiefs of Staff as chief of the Combat Operations and Analysis Branch in the operations directorate (J-3).

== Later career ==
In September 1969, Henion was promoted to brigadier general and assigned to Vietnam War duty as assistant division commander of the 1st Infantry Division. As the acting division commander, he led the withdrawal of its last soldiers from Vietnam in March 1970, including two departure ceremonies in South Vietnam and an arrival ceremony at Forbes Air Force Base in Kansas. In May 1970, he was assigned as director of training and special assistant to the commander of Military Assistance Command, Vietnam.

Upon returning to the United States, Henion was appointed commander of the United States Army Recruiting Command, and he was promoted to major general in June 1971. During his time in this post, the Army began the transition from the Vietnam War draft to an all-volunteer military. When the United States Army Audit Agency uncovered recruiting irregularities—including recruiters taking applicants denied enlistment at one processing center to different centers to try again—Henion requested an investigation. The United States Army Criminal Investigation Command (CID) inquiry, which included undercover agents, exposed additional issues, after which Henion directed implementation of an improvement plan.

In March 1974, Henion was assigned to command the 9th Infantry Division at Fort Lewis, Washington. During his time in command, he organized and led 'Octofoil Day' to celebrate the third anniversary of the division's assignment to Fort Lewis and the 57th anniversary of its activation for the First World War. (Note: The 9th Division's insignia includes an octofoil.) The ceremonies included most of the organization's 13,000 members and was attended by Norman R. Augustine, the acting United States Secretary of the Army. In August 1975, Henion was assigned as chief of staff for United States Army Forces Command at Fort McPherson, Georgia. In April 1977, he was selected for promotion to lieutenant general and assigned to command United States Army Japan. He served in this position until retiring in June 1980.

In retirement, Henion resided in Austin, Texas. He died in Austin on 31 May 1983. Henion was buried at Fort Sam Houston National Cemetery.

== Awards ==
Henion's awards included:

- Army Distinguished Service Medal with oak leaf cluster
- Legion of Merit
- Distinguished Flying Cross
- Bronze Star Medal with oak leaf cluster and "V" device for valor
- Meritorious Service Medal
- Air Medal with numeral 5
- Joint Service Commendation Medal
- Army Commendation Medal
- American Campaign Medal
- European–African–Middle Eastern Campaign Medal with 4 campaign stars
- World War II Victory Medal
- Army of Occupation Medal (Germany)
- Army of Occupation Medal (Japan)
- National Defense Service Medal with oak leaf cluster
- Korean Service Medal with 3 campaign stars
- United Nations Service Medal Korea
- Armed Forces Expeditionary Medal
- Vietnam Service Medal
- Vietnam Campaign Medal
- Republic of Vietnam Distinguished Service Order, 1st Class
- Republic of Vietnam Air Service Medal, Honorary Class
- Republic of Korea Presidential Unit Citation (5th Infantry Regiment, 1951)
- Combat Infantryman Badge

== Dates of rank ==
- Private and Corporal, Organized Reserve Corps, 1942 to 1944
- Second Lieutenant, 1944
- First Lieutenant, 1945
- Captain, 1950
- Major, 1951
- Lieutenant Colonel, 1960
- Colonel, 1966
- Brigadier General, 1969
- Major General, 1971
- Lieutenant General, 1977
- Lieutenant General (Retired), 1980

== Notes ==
Military offices
Preceded by Carter W. Clarke Jr.	Commander of United States Army Recruiting Command; 1971–1974	Succeeded by William B. Fulton
Preceded by William B. Fulton	Commander of 9th Infantry Division; 1974–1975	Succeeded by Volney F. Warner
Preceded by John R. Guthrie	Commander of United States Army Japan; 1977–1980	Succeeded by Roscoe Robinson Jr.
