= Fort Buckner =

U.S. Army base on Okinawa

Coordinates: 26°17′39″N 127°46′41″E

Fort Buckner is a United States Army base located immediately south of Camp Foster, near Futenma, on Okinawa, Japan, falling under control of United States Army, Japan. The 78th Signal Battalion is the only unit on this small installation and assumed all United States Army Signal Corps duties in Japan after the 58th Signal Battalion was inactivated in 2012. The 78th Signal Battalion operates a part of the Defense Satellite Communications System from Fort Buckner. All local Army-specific support for the unit is located on Torii Station, but due to the joint force nature of United States military operations on Okinawa, many ancillary services for Fort Buckner units are located on Camp Foster and Kadena Air Base. Fort Buckner was named in honor of Lieutenant General Simon Bolivar Buckner, Jr., who was killed in action while commanding the Tenth Army during the Battle of Okinawa during World War II.

The Utility Tactical Transport Helicopter Company, the first armed helicopter company in the United States Army, was activated on July 25, 1961 at Fort Buckner.
