= Battle of Barawala Kalay Valley =

2011 battle in Afghanistan

- Part of the War in Afghanistan (2001–2021)
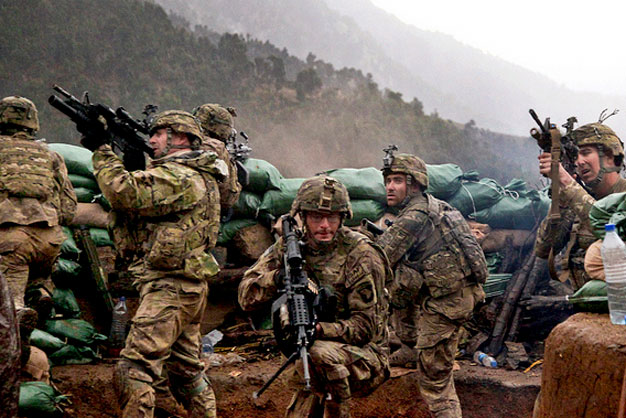
- U.S. Soldiers with 2nd Battalion, 327th Infantry Regiment, 101st Airborne Division return fire during a firefight with Taliban forces in Barawala Kalay Valley
Date	29 March 2011-8 April 2011
Location	Kunar Province, Afghanistan
Result	Coalition victory

Belligerents
United States	(Afghanistan) Taliban insurgents

Commanders and leaders
Major General John F. Campbell; Lieutenant Colonel Joel B. Vowell (Commander); Captain Ed Bankston	Qari Ziaur Rahman

Units involved
2nd Battalion, 327th Infantry Regiment; Afghan National Army; 6th Squadron, 6th U.S. Cavalry Regiment; United States Air Force Pararescue	Taliban insurgents

Casualties and losses
6 killed 7 wounded	100+ killed

The Battle of Barawala Kalay Valley took place 29 March 2011 – 8 April 2011 in Barawala Kalay Valley, Kunar Province, Afghanistan. The battle was part of the War in Afghanistan (2001–2021). The goal was to close down the Taliban supply route through the Barawala Kalay Valley and to remove the forces of Taliban warlord Qari Ziaur Rahman from the Barwala Kalay Valley.

The United States was represented by 2nd Battalion, 327th Infantry Regiment (2/327th Infantry) part of the 101st Airborne Division. The 2nd Battalion is also known as the "No Slack Battalion." The 101st Airborne Division ("Screaming Eagles") is a modular specialized light infantry division of the United States Army trained for air assault operations. Most of the 101st Airborne Division's operations are conducted by highly mobile teams behind enemy lines. The 2/327th Infantry was supported by the Afghan National Army.

The 2/327th Infantry found itself under heavy small arms fire from multiple directions from Taliban insurgents. ABC News correspondent Mike Boettcher was on scene and he called it the fiercest fighting he has ever seen in his 30 years of being in war zones. The Taliban would engage the 2/327th Infantry with heavy small arms fire for five continuous hours on 29 March 2011. The 2/327th Infantry would suffer 6 soldiers killed and another 7 soldiers wounded. The 2/327th Infantry would inflict heavy casualties upon the Taliban, killing more than 100 Taliban insurgents. There were seven Medical Evacuation flight attempts within two hours in an effort to evacuate the 2/327th Infantry's wounded. United States Air Force Pararescue personnel conducted the first rescue attempt, but their pilot was shot in the process and their helicopter was forced to return to its base. The 101st Airborne Division would eventually receive strong air support. American helicopters from Task Force Six Shooters and bombers conducted bombing missions against Taliban positions once the weather permitted. The 2/327th Infantry would go on to eventually secure Barawala Kalay Valley closing down a key Taliban supply route in the process. Taliban warlord Qari Ziaur Rahman and his fighters were also driven out of the valley.
