= Sally Murphy (U.S. Army officer) =

U.S. Army aviator

Sally D. Murphy
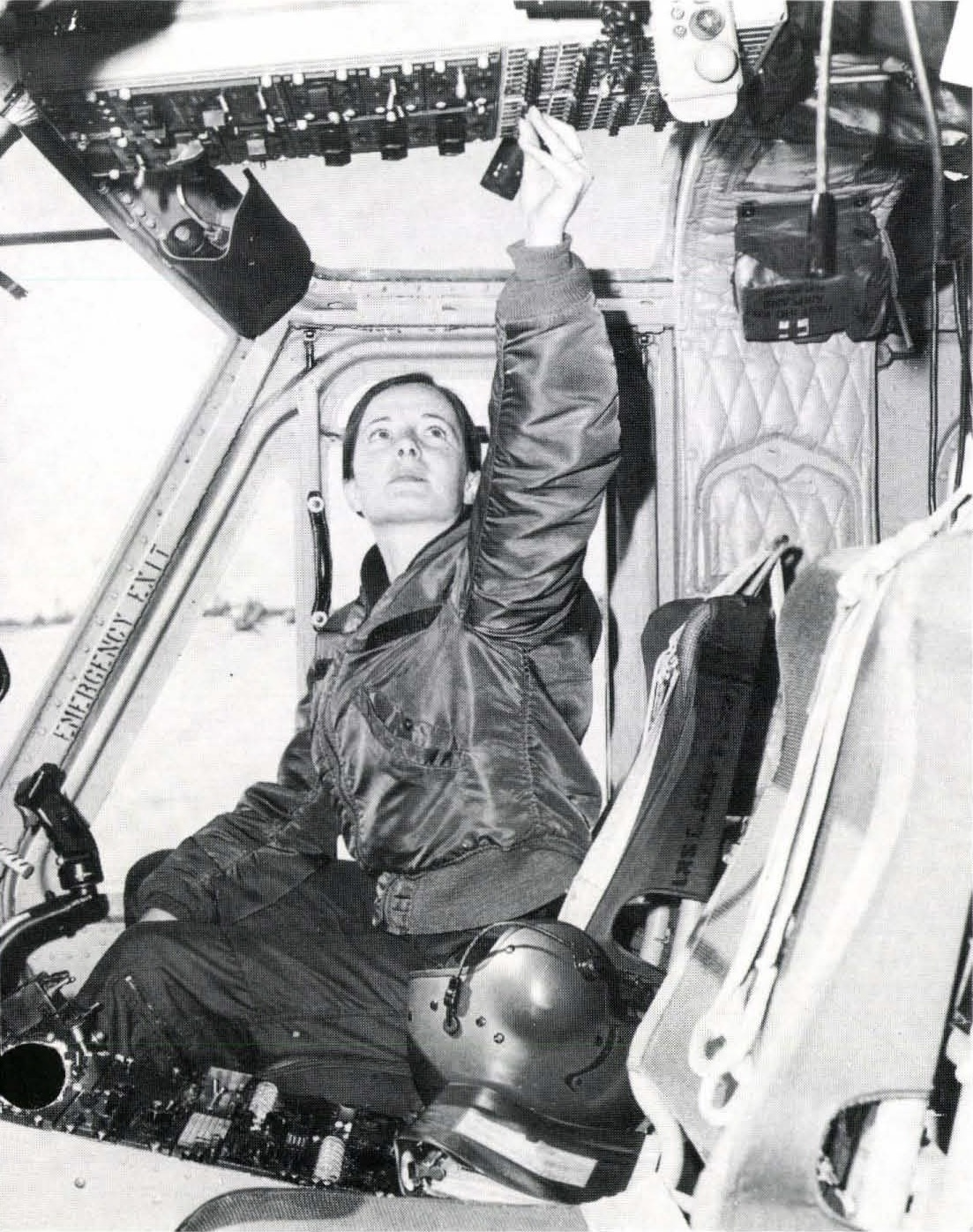
- 2nd Lt. Murphy in 1974
- Born: Sally Dale Stonecipher; January 11, 1949 (age 77); Wichita, Kansas
- Military career
- Branch: United States Army
- Rank: Colonel

Sally D. Murphy (born January 11, 1949) is a retired colonel who served as a United States Army Aviator. She was the first female U.S. Army helicopter pilot to graduate from flight school at Fort Rucker, Alabama on June 4, 1974. She served as a leader for units within the 330th Army Security Agency Company, 1st Infantry Division, the 62nd Aviation Company, and the 78th Aviation Battalion. In 2009, Murphy received the U.S. Army Freedom Team Salute Veteran Commendation to commemorate her 27 years of service and her place in military history.

== Biography ==
=== Early life ===
Sally Dale Stonecipher was born in Wichita, Kansas and grew up in Overland Park, Kansas. She attended Shawnee Mission West High School, graduating in 1967. Stonecipher then attended Kansas State College of Pittsburg, receiving a master's degree in history in December 1972. A month after graduation, she joined the United States Army.

=== Military career ===
At the beginning of her career in the army, she attended an 11-week orientation course Army's Women Army Corps (WAC) program for women officers at Fort McClellan, Alabama in 1972. She also had previously attended the Military Intelligence School at Fort Huachuca, Arizona. Following completion of the course, Murphy then entered into the Aviation School when it opened its ranks to women.

During flight school on her first day, the officer in charge singled Murphy out in front of the class and announced that she was the first woman to go through flight school at Fort Rucker. A captain once demanded to know what she was doing wearing a flight suit and accused her of making a mockery of it. Later, she learned that some civilian contractor flight instructors refused to train her. She never suffered any sexual harassment, only sexual discrimination because of the policies that barred women from fighting alongside men on the ground.

After graduating, she served with the 330th Army Security Agency Company (Guardrail II) flying RU-21 airplanes as an intelligence officer along the border between Germany and the Soviet Union. Later she flew Huey helicopters and commanded a company for the 1st Infantry Division at Fort Riley, Kansas for 4 years. She returned to Germany and in 1986 was assigned commander of the 62nd Aviation Company (The Coachmen) in support of V Corps headquarters. In 1991, Murphy was assigned to the 78th Aviation Battalion at Camp Zama, Japan. Under her command, the unit flew and maintained UH-1 and UH-60 (Sikorsky Blackhawk) helicopters and C-12 (Beechcraft King Air) airplanes.

At the rank of major, Murphy served in the Headquarters, Department of the Army, Office of the Deputy Chief of Staff for Operations, Force Development office for intelligence systems, including her responsibility for the Army's unmanned aerial vehicle program. She wrote, staffed, and received approval for the first Joint requirements document plan for unmanned aerial vehicles, its master plan.

After 27 years of service, Murphy retired as a colonel in 1999 and received the U.S. Army Freedom Team Salute Veteran Commendation . In March 2009, she was honored at a ceremony at Fort Myer in Arlington County, Virginia. During the service, she was lauded as a groundbreaker who made progressing through the army easier for the women who followed her.

=== Personal life ===
Stonecipher's first marriage ended in divorce. Four days after graduating from flight school as Sally Woolfolk, she married a combat Huey helicopter pilot who had served in Vietnam and became Sally Murphy. In February 1980 they had a son, a captain with the 82nd Airborne Division who deployed once to Afghanistan and once to Iraq. He died after his parachute failed during a 2009 training mission in North Carolina. Her daughter-in-law is also a soldier and has served two tours in Iraq.

== Awards ==
- U.S. Army Freedom Team Salute Veteran Commendation
