= 78th Signal Battalion (United States) =

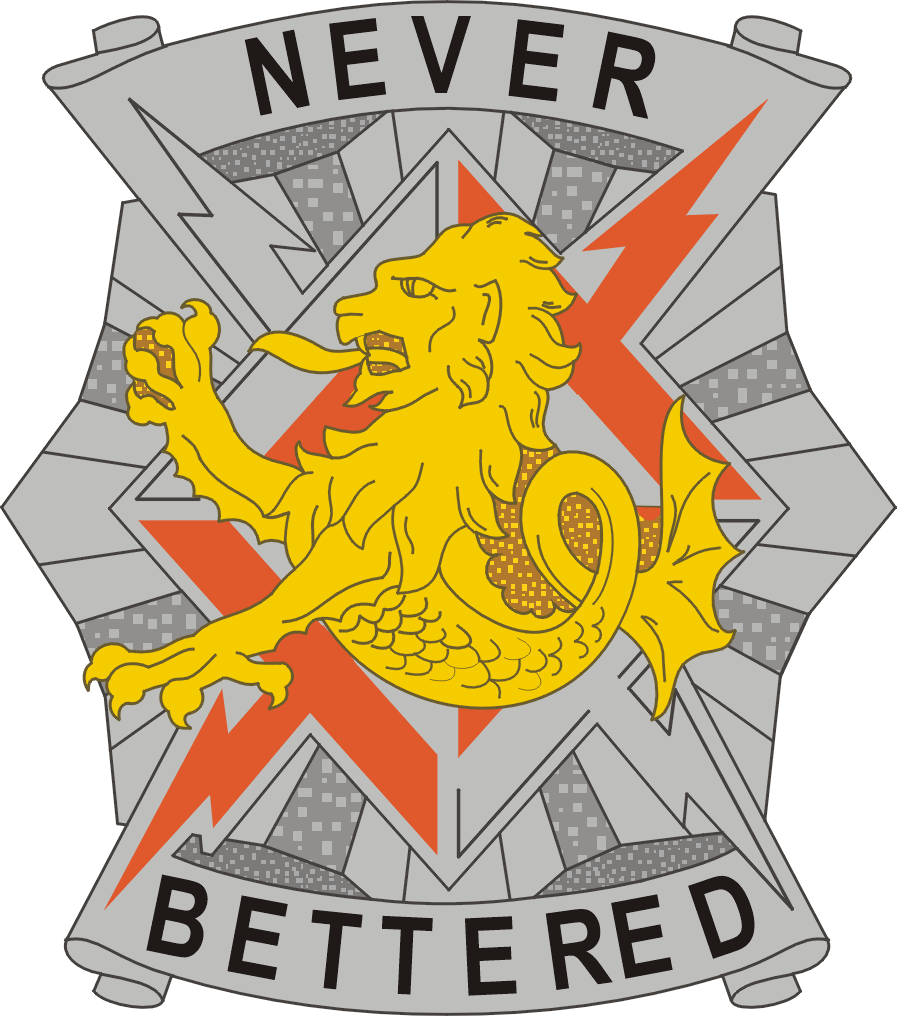
- Distinctive Unit Insignia
- Active: 16 October 1992-Present
- Country: United States
- Branch: United States Army
- Type: Signal Battalion
- Part of: US Army Japan
- Motto: "Never Bettered"

Commanders
- Current commander: Lieutenant Colonel Dustin W. Durst

The 78th Signal Battalion is a strategic Signal Battalion subordinate to the 516th Signal Brigade and headquartered at Camp Zama, Japan. The battalion supports the United States Army Japan (USARJ). The battalion has four subordinate units - Headquarters and Headquarters Detachment (HHD) (Camp Zama), US Army Network Enterprise Center-Camp Zama (Camp Zama), US Army Network Enterprise Center-Okinawa (Okinawa), and US Army Defense Satellite Communications System (DSCS) -Okinawa(Okinawa).

== Mission ==
The battalion mission is to provide and defend the Pacific LandWarNet and expeditionary communications capabilities as part of U.S. Army Pacific's Theater Information Grid, enabling mission command and information superiority.

== History ==
The 78th Signal Battalion was activated October 16, 1992, and based at Camp Zama, Japan but is tied to the U.S. Army Signal Corps history and lineage dating back to the end of World War II.

In August 1945, the 232nd Signal Operations Company was deployed to Yokohama and the 4035th Signal Support Seaborne Communications Detachment was deployed to Tokyo. Jointly, they comprised the First U.S. Army Communications Center with general headquarters in the Dai-ichi Life Building, Tokyo. Shortly thereafter, other small signal elements in Japan were absorbed and the unit was redesigned the 71st Signal Service Battalion. The unit was assigned the mission of operating the long lines communication system in the Far East. Post, camp and station communication responsibilities were given to the Japan Signal Service Battalion, which had been formed just prior to the 71st Signal Service Battalion activation.

In 1947 on Okinawa, the 8111th Army Service Unit was activated. Part of its mission was the performance of signal functions. In 1957, the 8111th was redesignated the U.S. Army Signal Group, Ryukyu Islands. In 1958, the 71st Signal Service Battalion and the Japan Signal Service Battalion combined to form the U.S. Army Communications Agency. In 1960 it assumed responsibility for signal supply elements of U.S. Army Depot, Sagami.

In 1963, the depot mission was transferred to U.S. Army Depot, Japan. At the same time, the Army Communications Agency was re-designated U.S. Army Signal Command. In 1964, the Signal Command transferred the long haul communications mission, including tape rely, transmitter, receiver, microwave, and troop sites to the United States Air Force. From 1965 to 1966, the battalion remained a facility operated by the U.S. Army Strategic Communications Command (STRATCOM) and underwent two name changes. They were STRATCOM Station-Okinawa which soon changed to STRATCOM Signal Group-Okinawa. In November 1966, they were again re-designated was redesigned to U.S. Army Strategic Communication Signal Group (USASTRATCOM), Japan.

In 1970, a major addition to STRATCOM Signal Group-Okinawa was activated. The Area Maintenance and Supply Facility (AMSF) concept was implemented in Okinawa. The unit provided maintenance and supply support to the electronics and signal units on the island, and eventually, its mission was expanded to cover the entire Pacific region.

In 1973, USASTRATCOM became U.S. Army Communications Command (USACC), Japan. In 1984, the name was changed to U.S. Army Information Systems Command (USAISC), Japan, due to a U.S. Army reorganization. Signal activities on Honshu became Signal Activity North (SAN). At that time, the SAN commander became assumed additional duties as Director of Information Management (DOIM) for the U.S. Army Japan’s subordinate command on Honshu.

In Okinawa in November 1973, U.S. Army Communications Command (USACC) and another battalion changed to USACC Signal Support Agency South. In 1976, it was renamed USACC-Japan Signal Activity South (SAS). In 1977, it was designated the 71st Signal Battalion (Provisional). In 1978, it reverted to USACC-Japan SAS. In 1979, the basis for the signal battalion as we know it today was formed. The AMSF and a new unit, the United States Army Intelligence and Security Command (INSCOM) Detachment, became subordinate units of SAS. A headquarters detachment and operations company were formed providing the battalion with four subordinate elements. In 1980, SAS was renamed U.S. Army Activity (USAA)-Japan Signal Battalion and in 1982, the signal battalion grew again when the Tactical Satellite Detachment was added.

In May 1984, the U.S. Army Communication Command was re-designated and Okinawa’s battalion fell under the newly named U.S. Army Information Systems Command (USAISC), and its mission has remained the same, to be the "Voice of the Army" and the voice of United States government agencies on Okinawa. Meanwhile, the Headquarters Army staff also reorganized to fully integrate the information functions of automation, administration, communication, and command and control under the assistant chief of staff for information management, which provided direction and leadership at the Department of Army level. This reorganization was necessary to achieve better oversight, disciplined acquisition, and improved the quality, flow, and processing of information.

In August 1984, subcommands came under USAISC. At that time, the U.S. Army Japan Office of Assistant Chief of Staff, Communication-Electronics, was re-designated as USARJ Office of the Deputy Chief of Staff, Information Management. In 1985, the INSCOM Detachment was inactivated and AMSF became a separate, subordinate element of USAISC-Japan, at Camp Zama.

In April 1985, the USARJ information mission consisting of audiovisual and automation functions was transferred to USAISC-J. On November 1, 1985, the signal battalion in Okinawa was restructured and provisionally reorganized into two separate subcommands, USAISC-J Signal Battalion and USAISC-J Area Maintenance and Supply Facility-Pacific.

On mainland Japan, the reorganization of SAN under the Information Mission Area (IMA) concept continued through the 1980s. The Audiovisual IMA was transferred to SAN on April 1, 1985. During 1986, the USARJ television studio and closed-circuit television cable and public address system also were incorporated into SAN. The Administrative Services Division, Consolidated Data Processing Center, and Information Center came under the operational control of SAN in February 1988 thereby placing all five IMAs under SAN.

On June 30, 1989, SAN was reorganized as the 1141st U.S. Army Signal Battalion with two units, a base operations company and a headquarters and headquarters detachment. A year later, the 1141st and a sister battalion, the 1140th U.S. Army Signal Battalion, Okinawa, came under the command of the newly organized 1104th U.S. Army Signal Brigade in Japan. The 1104th was inactivated September 30, 1991, and command of the battalions transferred to the 1106th U.S. Army Signal Brigade in Hawaii. Operational control of the 1141st U.S. Army Signal Battalion remained with the Commander, USARJ/9th Theater Army Area Command (TAAC).

As part of a continuing reorganization of USAISC, driven by an Army drawdown, the 1141st U.S. Army Signal Battalion was inactivated and the 78th Signal Battalion was activated October 16, 1992, at Camp Zama, Japan, assuming Army Signal responsibilities for mainland Japan. Meanwhile, on the same date, the 58th Signal Battalion was activated and assumed Army Signal duties on Okinawa. Additionally, the 287th, 333rd, and 349th Signal Companies were also activated.

Command of the 78th remained with the Hawaii-based 516th Signal Brigade (formerly 1106th) and operational control remained with the commander, USARJ/9th TAAC and since December 19, 2007, USARJ/I Corps (Forward).

Following the devastating magnitude 9.1 Tōhoku earthquake in northeastern Honshu, Japan March 11, 2011, 78th Signal Battalion unit personnel contributed significantly to the disaster relief efforts during Operation Tomodachi.

On October 12, 2012, 78th Signal Battalion assumed control of all Army Signal duties in Japan when the Okinawa-based 58th Signal Battalion was inactivated.

== Subordinate units ==
- HHD, Camp Zama, Kanagawa, Japan
- USANEC-Camp Zama, Camp Zama, Kanagawa, Japan
- DSCS, Fort Buckner, Okinawa, Japan
- USANEC-Okinawa, Torii Station, Okinawa, Japan
