= Jack D. Woodall =

United States Army general

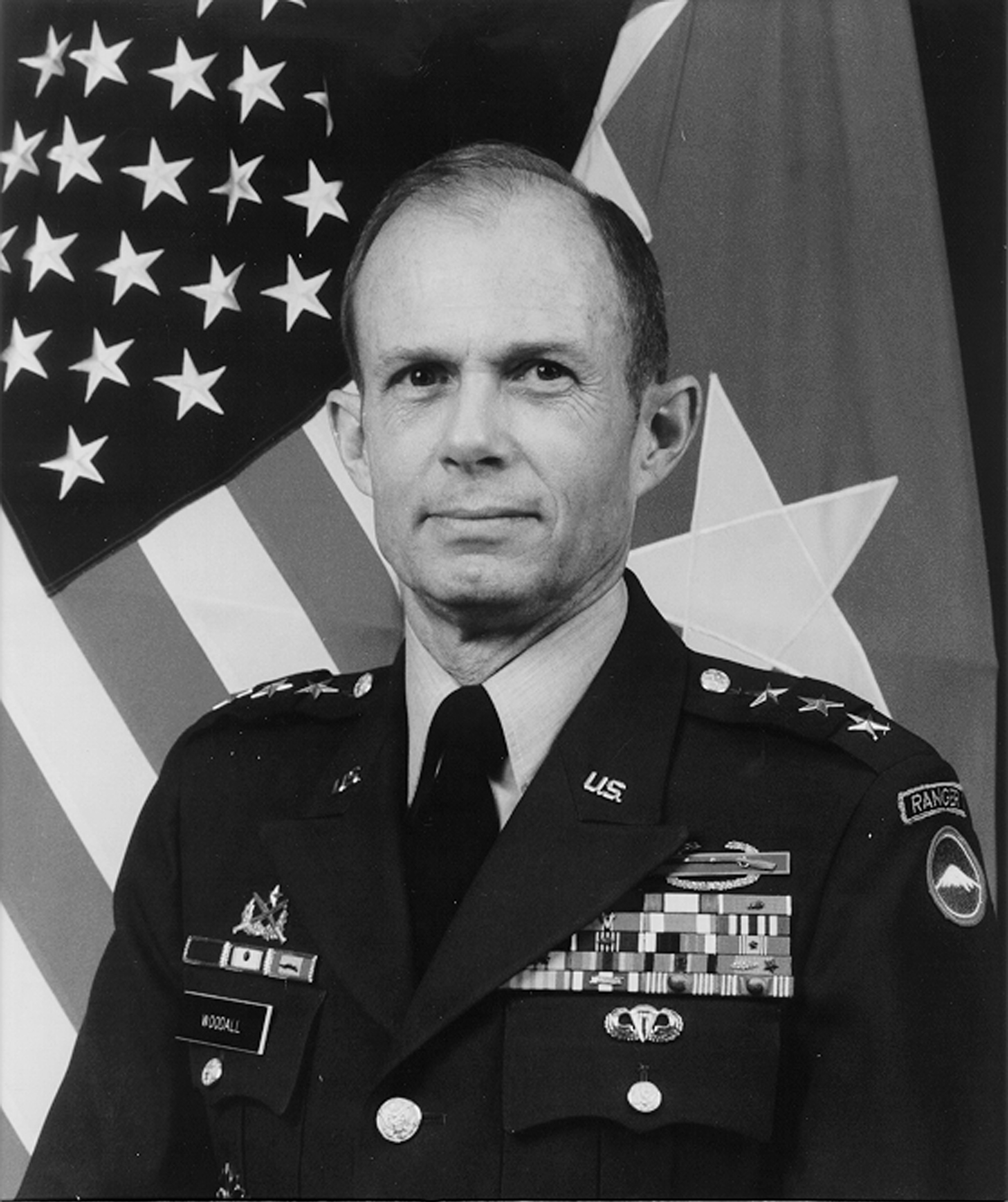
- Born: 1 August 1936 (age 90); Ferndale, Michigan U.S.
- Military career
- Allegiance: United States
- Branch: United States Army
- Service years: 1950s–1992
- Rank: Lieutenant general
- Commands: United States Army Japan

Jack D. Woodall (born 1 August 1936) is a retired lieutenant general in the United States Army whose assignments included commander United States Army Japan, Commander Berlin Brigade 1986 - 1987, and 2nd Infantry Division.
