= Joel B. Vowell =

US Army officer

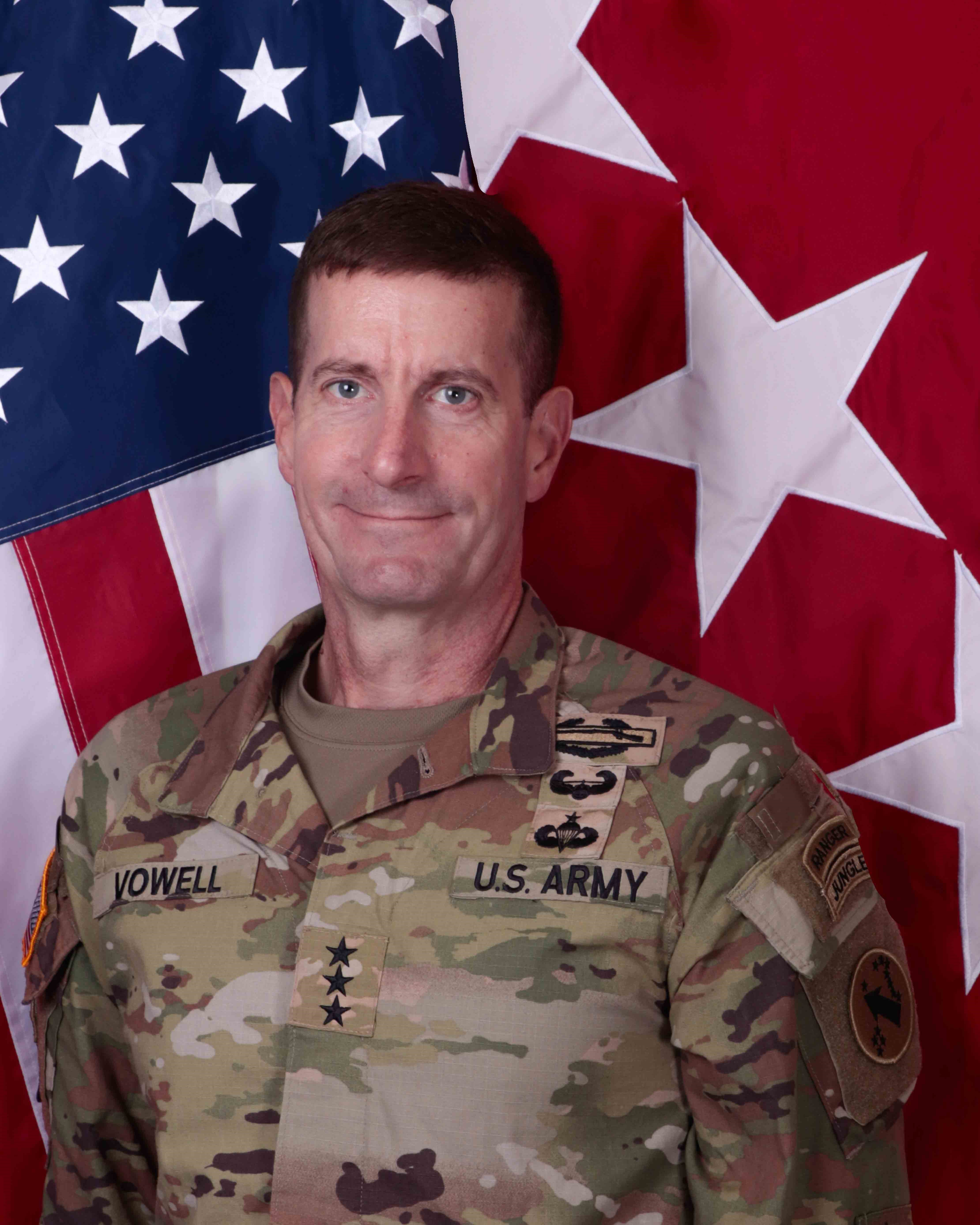
- Military career
- Allegiance: United States
- Branch: United States Army
- Service years: 1991–present
- Rank: Lieutenant General
- Commands: Combined Joint Task Force – Operation Inherent Resolve; United States Army, Japan; 3rd Brigade Combat Team,101st Airborne Division; 2nd Battalion, 327th Infantry Regiment
- Conflicts: War in Afghanistan: Battle of Barawala Kalay Valley; Iraq War; Operation Inherent Resolve
- Awards: Defence Superior Service Medal; Legion of Merit (2); Bronze Star Medal (4)

Joel B. Vowell is a United States Army lieutenant general who has served as the deputy commanding general of United States Army Pacific since 30 September 2024. He most recently served as the commanding general of Combined Joint Task Force – Operation Inherent Resolve from 2023 to 2024. He previously commanded United States Army Japan from 2021 to 2023. He also served as deputy director, strategic planning and policy, U.S. INDOPACOM/J5. He previously served as 25th ID Deputy Commanding Officer-Operations.

== Military career ==
Joel "JB" Vowell grew up in a military family and received his commission as an infantry officer upon graduation from the University of Alabama in 1991. During his career, he has been stationed in Europe, the Pacific, and many posts across the United States.

He has deployed on three combat tours in Afghanistan and two in Iraq, including both surge campaigns. He commanded the 3rd Brigade Combat Team ("Rakkasans") of the 101st Airborne Division at Fort Campbell, Kentucky. Vowell was a War College Fellow at Stanford University and was the Army Chief of Staff's Senior Fellow to the Brookings Institution.

In July 2024, Vowell was nominated for promotion to lieutenant general and assignment as deputy commanding general of United States Army Pacific.

Military offices
Preceded by Viet Xuan Luong	Commanding General of United States Army, Japan; 2021–2023	Succeeded by David B. Womack
Preceded by Matthew McFarlane	Commander of Combined Joint Task Force – Operation Inherent Resolve; 2023–2024	Succeeded by Kevin C. Leahy
Preceded by James Jarrard	Deputy Commanding General of United States Army Pacific; 2024–present	Incumbent
