= U.S. Army Aviation Battalion Japan =

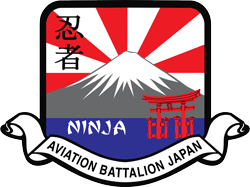
- Country: United States
- Branch: United States Army
- Type: Aviation
- Size: Battalion
- Part of: US Army Japan
- Garrison/HQ: Camp Zama, Japan
- Nickname: Ninjas
- Anniversaries: 1 April 2013; 13 years ago
- Decorations: Army Superior Unit Award

Commanders
- Current commander: Lieutenant Colonel Nicklaus C. Franck
- Notable commanders: COL (Retired) Sally D. Murphy

Aircraft flown
- Utility helicopter: Sikorsky UH-60L Black Hawk
- Transport: Cessna UC-35 Citation

U.S. Army Aviation Battalion Japan ("Ninjas") is a U.S. Army military unit based at Camp Zama in Kanagawa Prefecture, Japan. Formerly the 78th Aviation Battalion (Provisional), It is equipped with UH-60L Black Hawks. On 1 April 2013, the Department of the Army granted official battalion status, and the unit was renamed the United States Army Aviation Battalion Japan, resulting in internal structure changes and additional personnel authorizations. The Battalion is composed of Headquarters, Headquarters Company (HHC) "Bushmasters", Alpha Company "Ravens", Alpha Company, 52nd Aviation Regiment (Detachment), Department of Defense (DOD) contractors and Japanese Master Labor Contractors (MLC).

The mission of the U.S. Army Aviation Battalion Japan "Ninjas" is to conduct aviation operations in support of the U.S. Army Japan and I Corps (Forward). The battalion is prepared to deploy in support of regional contingencies, joint/bilateral exercises, and regional stability and support operations. The U.S. Army Aviation Battalion Japan, conducts a variety of air movement and training support missions to include distinguished visitor transport, U.S. military and Department of Defense civilian transport, overwater/shipboard operations, humanitarian assistance/disaster relief, casualty evacuation, external sling-load operations, rappelling, airborne operations, helocasting, firefighting/water bucket operations, and aerial gunnery. The battalion has participated in many joint and bilateral exercises throughout the Pacific, such as Yama Sakura, North Wind, Orient Shield, Ulchi Focus Lens, Cobra Gold and Balikatan.

== Notable Commanders ==
- Colonel (Retired) Sally D. Murphy, the Army's first female helicopter pilot.
