= 311th Military Intelligence Battalion (United States) =

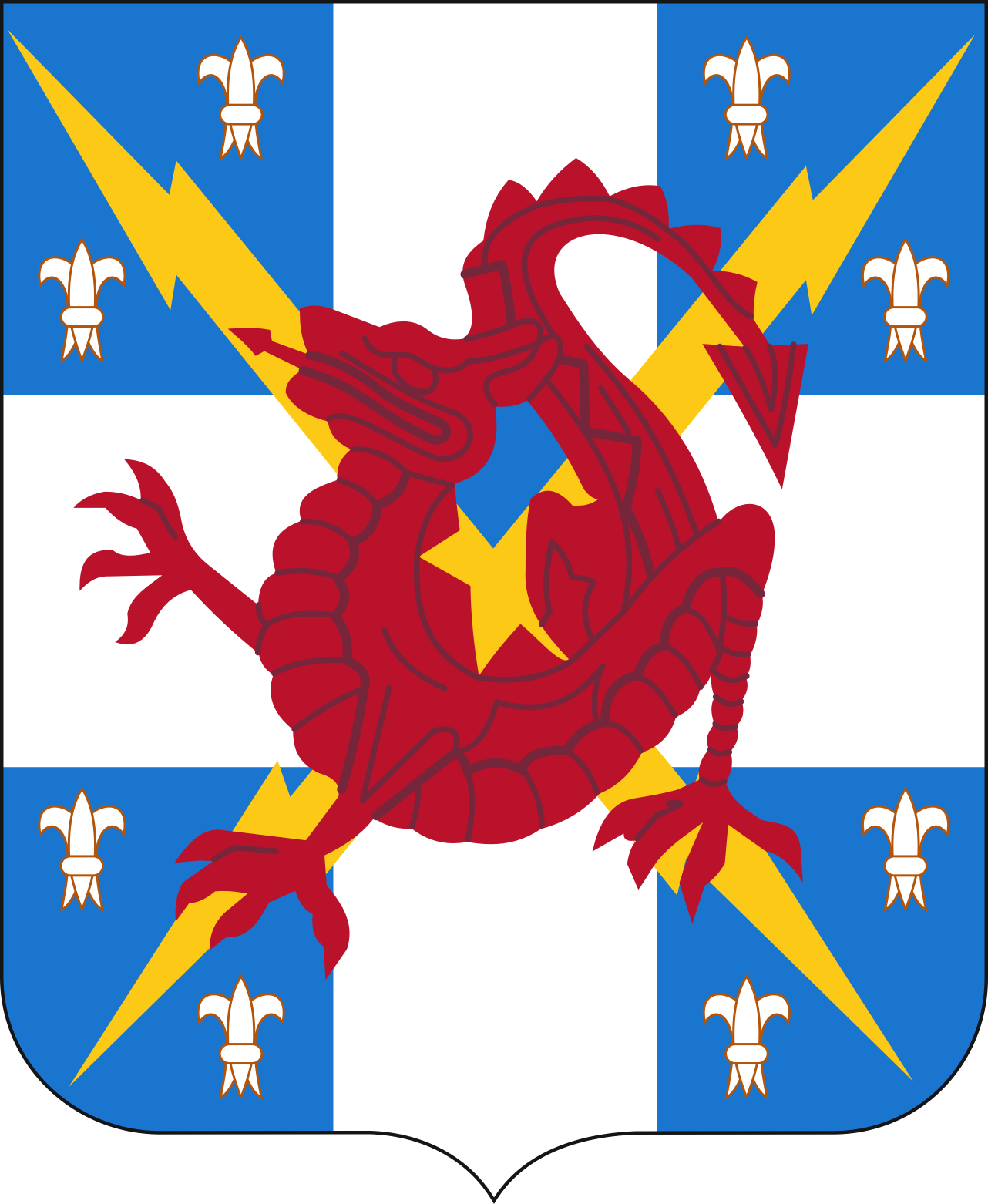
- 311th Military Intelligence Battalion Coat of Arms
- Active: 1954—1957 1966—1971 1982—2004 2018—present
- Country: United States
- Branch: United States Army
- Type: Military Intelligence
- Size: Battalion
- Part of: 500th MI Brigade
- Motto: Eyes of the Eagle

Insignia
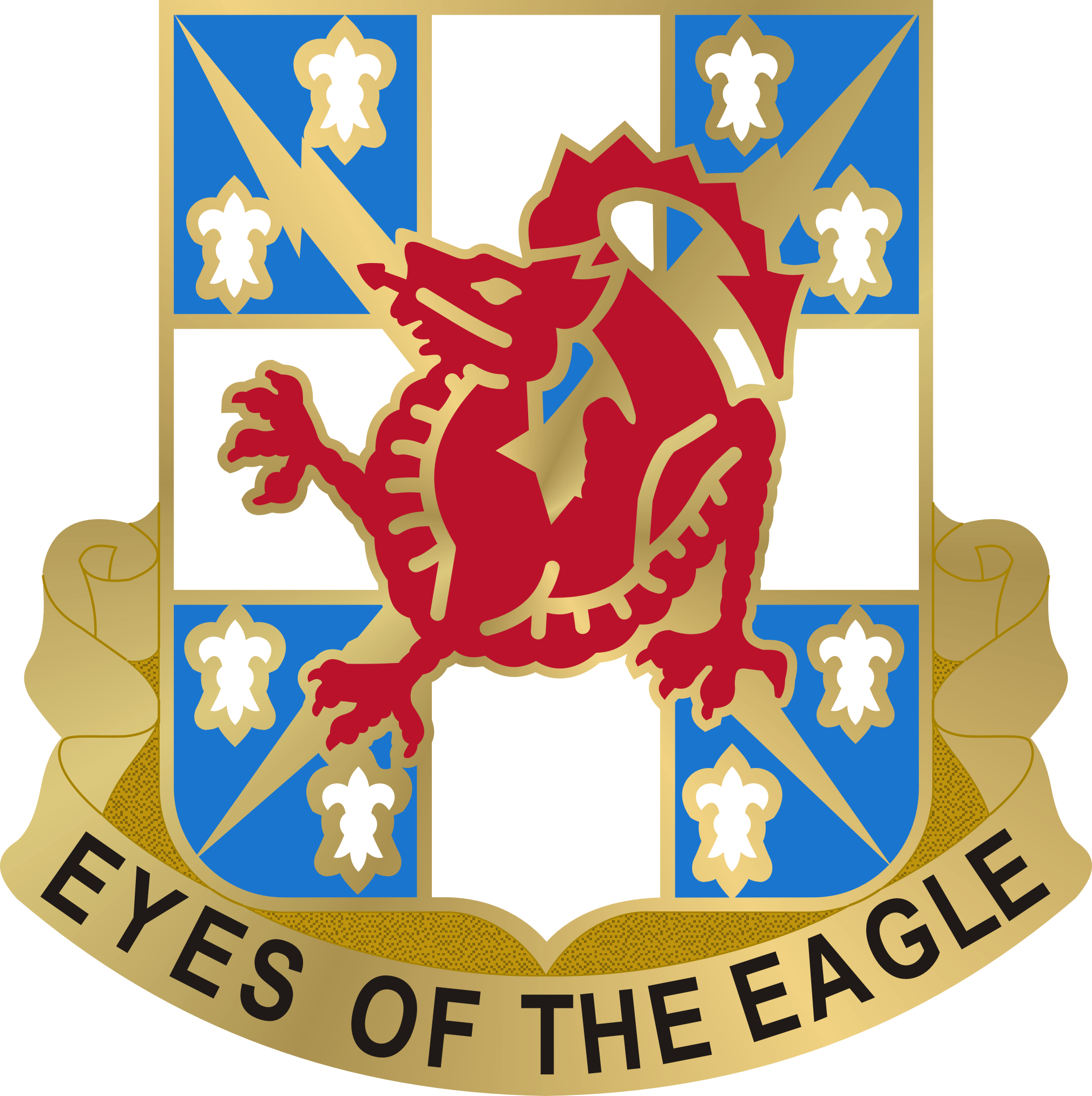
- Distinctive Unit Insignia

The 311th Military Intelligence Battalion is an active duty Military Intelligence (MI) Battalion of the United States Army stationed at Camp Zama, Japan and assigned to the 500th MI Brigade. The 311th MI Battalion is equipped to continue to provide support and train alongside U.S. Army Japan partner units, and Japan Ground Self-Defense Force coalition partners. The 311th conducts continuous multi-discipline Intelligence operations in support of U.S. Army Pacific operations and national level requirements in the U.S. Indo-Pacific area of operations.

== Lineage ==
- Constituted 1 June 1954 in the Regular Army as Headquarters and Headquarters Detachment, 311th Communication Reconnaissance Battalion
- Activated 14 June 1954 at Fort Devens, Massachusetts
- Reorganized and redesignated 16 May 1955 as Headquarters and Headquarters Company, 311th Communication Reconnaissance Battalion (336th Communication Reconnaissance Company [activated 6 August 1952] and 359th Communication Reconnaissance Company [activated 15 August 1944] concurrently reorganized and redesignated as Companies A and B)
- Redesignated 1 July 1956 as the 311th Army Security Agency Battalion
- Inactivated 18 December 1957 at Camp Wolters, Texas
- Headquarters and Headquarters Company activated 15 February 1966 at Fort Wolters, Texas (Companies A and B concurrently disbanded)
- Inactivated 30 June 1971 at Fort Hood, Texas
- (Companies A and B reconstituted 21 September 1978 in the Regular Army as the 336th and 359th Army Security Agency Companies - hereafter separate lineages)
- Headquarters and Headquarters Company, 311th Army Security Agency Battalion, reorganized and redesignated 1 June 1982 as Headquarters, Headquarters and Operations Company, 311th Military Intelligence Battalion, assigned to the 101st Airborne Division, and activated at Fort Campbell, Kentucky (265th Army Security Agency Company [see ANNEX 1] and 101st Military Intelligence Company [see ANNEX 2] concurrently reorganized and redesignated as Companies A and B)
- Deactivated 2004 as part of the US Army's new modular force structure
- In 2018, the 441st Military Intelligence Battalion was redesignated 311th Military Intelligence Battalion, under the 500th Military Intelligence Brigade-Theater, stationed at Camp Zama, Japan

=== Annex 1 ===
- Constituted 2 March 1967 in the Regular Army as the 265th Army Security Agency Company

- Activated 21 April 1967 at Fort Campbell, Kentucky

- Inactivated 1 April 1972 in Vietnam

- Activated 21 June 1976 at Fort Campbell, Kentucky

=== Annex 2 ===
- Constituted 12 July 1944 in the Army of the United States as the 101st Counter Intelligence Corps Detachment

- Activated 20 August 1944 in England with personnel from provisional Counter Intelligence Corps detachment attached to the 101st Airborne Division

- Inactivated 30 November 1945 in France

- Allotted 7 February 1956 to the Regular Army

- Activated 25 March 1956 at Fort Campbell, Kentucky

- Reorganized and redesignated 25 January 1958 as the 101st Military Intelligence Detachment

- Reorganized and redesignated 26 December 1969 as the 101st Military Intelligence Company

- Assigned 21 September 1978 to the 101st Airborne Division

== Honors ==
=== Unit Awards ===
Meritorious Unit Commendation
Southwest Asia

==== Company A additionally entitled to ====
- Meritorious Unit Commendation (Army) for VIETNAM 1967-1968

- Meritorious Unit Commendation (Army) for VIETNAM 1969-1970

- Meritorious Unit Commendation (Army) for VIETNAM 1971-1972

- Republic of Vietnam Cross of Gallantry with Palm for VIETNAM 1968

- Republic of Vietnam Cross of Gallantry with Palm for VIETNAM 1968-1969

- Republic of Vietnam Cross of Gallantry with Palm for VIETNAM 1970-1971

- Republic of Vietnam Cross of Gallantry with Palm for VIETNAM 1971

- Republic of Vietnam Civil Action Honor Medal, First Class for VIETNAM 1968-1970

==== Company B additionally entitled to ====
- Presidential Unit Citation (Army) for BASTOGNE

- French Croix de Guerre with Palm, World War II for NORMANDY

- Netherlands Orange Lanyard

- Belgian Croix de Guerre 1940 with Palm for BASTOGNE; cited in the Order of the Day of the Belgian Army for action at BASTOGNE

- Belgian Fourragere 1940

- Cited in the Order of the Day of the Belgian Army for action in FRANCE AND BELGIUM

- Republic of Vietnam Cross of Gallantry with Palm for VIETNAM 1968-1969

- Republic of Vietnam Cross of Gallantry with Palm for VIETNAM 1971

- Republic of Vietnam Civil Action Honor Medal, First Class for VIETNAM 1968-1970

=== Campaign Streamers ===
==== Southwest Asia ====
- Defense of Saudi Arabia
- Liberation and Defense of Kuwait

==== Company A additionally entitled to ====
===== Vietnam =====
- Counteroffensive, Phase III
- Tet Counteroffensive
- Counteroffensive, Phase IV
- Counteroffensive, Phase V
- Counteroffensive, Phase VI
- Tet 69/Counteroffensive
- Summer-Fall 1969
- Winter-Spring 1970
- Sanctuary Counteroffensive
- Counteroffensive, Phase VII
- Consolidation I
- Consolidation II
- Cease-Fire

==== Company B additionally entitled to ====
===== World War II =====
- Normandy (with arrowhead)
- Rhineland (with arrowhead)
- Ardennes-Alsace; Central Europe

===== Vietnam =====
- Counteroffensive, Phase III
- Tet Counteroffensive
- Counteroffensive, Phase IV
- Counteroffensive, Phase V
- Counteroffensive, Phase VI
- Tet 69/Counteroffensive
- Summer-Fall 1969
- Winter-Spring 1970
- Sanctuary Counteroffensive
- Counteroffensive, Phase VII
- Consolidation I
- Consolidation II

== Heraldry ==
=== Coat of arms ===
==== Blazon ====
The shield is Azure, a cross quarter-pierced Argent and overall two lightning bolts in saltire Or between in each quarter as many fleurs-de-lis of the second; overall a dragon passant Gules.

==== Symbolism ====
The checkered field in the colors used for Military Intelligence units, silver gray (white) and oriental blue, suggests the gathering of data to aid in the formulation of military strategy; the lightning bolts refer to the use of electronics in the gathering operation. The dragon is a reference to service in Vietnam and its scarlet color alludes to the award of three Meritorious Unit Commendations to elements of the Battalion. The fleurs-de-lis denote service in Europe during World War II.

=== Distinctive unit insignia ===
==== Blazon ====
A Gold color metal and enamel device 1 1/8 inches (2.9 cm) in height overall consisting of a shield blazoned: Azure, a cross quarter-pierced Argent and overall two lightning bolts in saltire Or between in each quarter as many fleurs-de-lis of the second; overall a dragon passant Gules. Attached below and to the sides of the shield a Gold scroll inscribed "EYES OF THE EAGLE" in Black letters.
