= Charles W. Dyke =

United States Army officer (1935–2025)

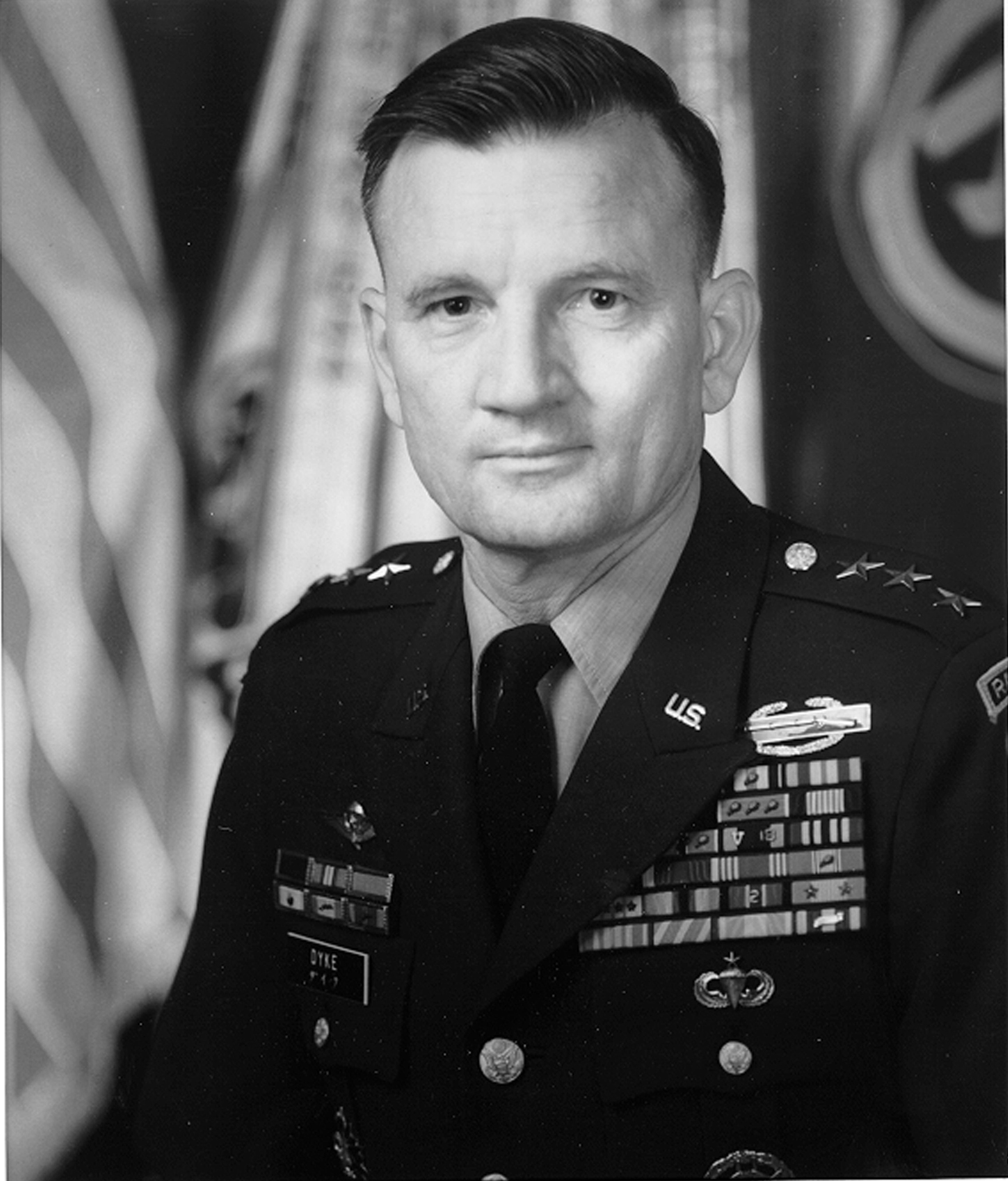
- Born: 28 July 1935; Covington, Georgia, U.S.
- Died: 25 November 2025 (aged 90)
- Military career
- Allegiance: United States
- Branch: United States Army
- Service years: 1954–1988
- Rank: Lieutenant general
- Nickname: Bill
- Commands: United States Army Japan; IX Corps; 8th Infantry Division; 1st Brigade, 101st Airborne Division; 2nd Battalion, 327th Infantry Regiment
- Conflicts: Vietnam War
- Awards: Silver Star Medal (2); Defense Superior Service Medal; Legion of Merit (4); Soldier's Medal; Bronze Star Medal (3); Purple Heart; Air Medal (18)

Charles William Dyke (28 July 1935 – 25 November 2025) was an American lieutenant general in the United States Army whose assignments included commander of United States Army Japan and IX Corps from 1985 to 1988, and of the 8th Infantry Division (Mechanized) in Europe from 1983 to 1985.

== Biography ==
On 21 June 1954, Dyke enlisted in the Army and was commissioned as a second lieutenant of infantry on 25 June 1955 upon graduation from Officer Candidate School. He later completed a B.A. degree in history at the University of Southern Mississippi in 1963, a Master of Military Arts and Science degree at the Army Command and General Staff College in 1967 and an M.A. degree in international affairs at George Washington University in 1968. Dyke was also a graduate of the Army War College.

Dyke commanded the 2nd Battalion, 327th Infantry, 101st Airborne Division in Vietnam, earning two Silver Star Medals, three Bronze Star Medals, the Purple Heart and eighteen Air Medals. He later commanded the 1st Brigade, 101st Airborne Division (Air Assault) at Fort Campbell and served as assistant commander of the 3rd Infantry Division (Mechanized) in Europe.

Dyke retired from active duty on 1 September 1988. He was inducted into the U.S. Army Ranger Hall of Fame in 2007.

Dyke died on 25 November 2025, at the age of 90.
