= 10th Support Group (United States) =

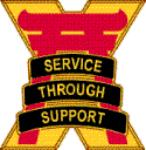
- Distinctive unit insignia
- Active: 15 October 1987 – Present
- Country: United States
- Branch: United States Army
- Role: Support
- Size: Group
- Part of: United States Army, Japan
- Garrison/HQ: Torii Station, Okinawa, Japan

Commanders
- Current commander: COL Torrance G. Cleveland

The 10th Support Group is a United States Army logistical support unit located in Okinawa, Japan. It is the senior U.S. Army unit on the island, and has coordinating responsibilities for U.S. Army activities there.

The 10th Support Group and United States Army, Japan conduct theater sustainment; execute reception, staging, onward movement (RSO); conduct expeditionary logistics in support of the U.S. Army Pacific; overseas contingency operations and the defense of Japan; and support OEF, OIF, POLMIL, multi and bilateral partnership engagements.

The group can provide logistics support throughout the Pacific, with elements on both mainland Japan and Okinawa.

== Subordinate units ==
Structure of the group is currently as follows:

- 10th Support Group Headquarters and Headquarters Company, Torii Station
- Ammunition Depot, 10th Support Group

== Lineage ==
The 10th Support Group was constituted in the Regular Army on October 15, 1987, at Torii Station, Okinawa, Japan, to provide administrative, base and contingency support.

On March 11, 2011, a devastating magnitude 9.0 earthquake struck eastern Japan followed by a devastating tsunami. It was the largest earthquake in Japan's history. More than 12,000 people were killed, 16,000 missing, and thousands were displaced. Immediately, Operation Tomodachi was established to provide humanitarian logistics support. At Sendai International Airport more than 120 Soldiers from the 10th Support Group along with other Japan-based Army units, deployed to assist the Japan Ground Self-Defense Force in their relief efforts. The Soldiers provided critical support to reopen the airport and local schools. They also distributed water, clothing and blankets as well as backpacks and toys to children. For its efforts, the unit was awarded the Army Superior Unit Award.

On October 1, 2011, the unit was reorganized and redesignated the 10th Support Group (Regional) and continues to provide administrative control for all Army organizations on Okinawa as well as providing base support and contingency support to deployed/employed forces in the Asia-Pacific region.

DECORATIONS: Army Superior Unit Award – March 11, 2011 ~ May 5, 2011
