= 516th Theater Signal Brigade =

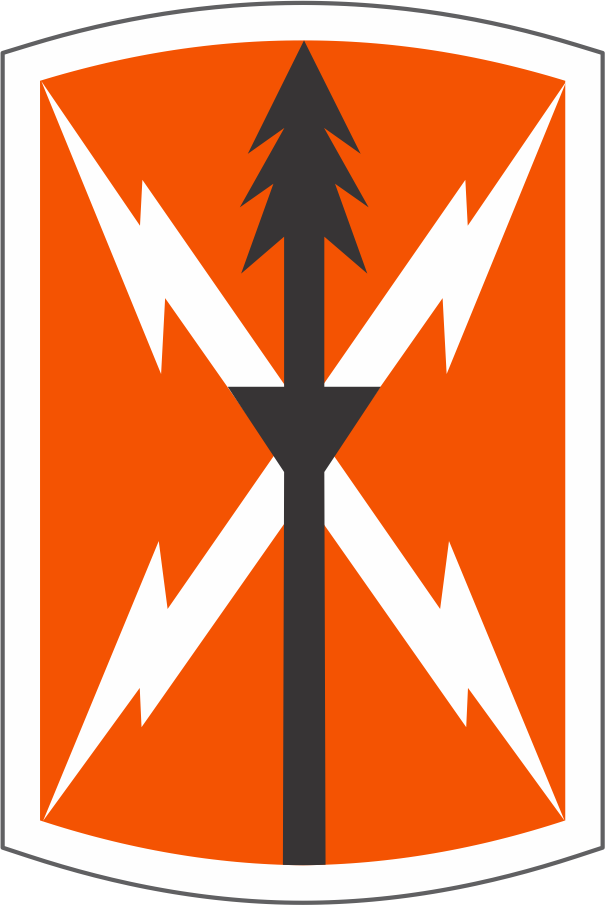
- 516th Theater Signal Brigade shoulder sleeve insignia
- Active: 16 October 1992-Present
- Country: United States
- Branch: United States Army
- Type: Signal
- Size: Brigade
- Part of: 311th Signal Command (Theater)
- Nickname: "Team Signal"

Commanders
- Current commander: COL Michael Ranado
- Command Sergeant Major: CSM David M. Burns

Insignia
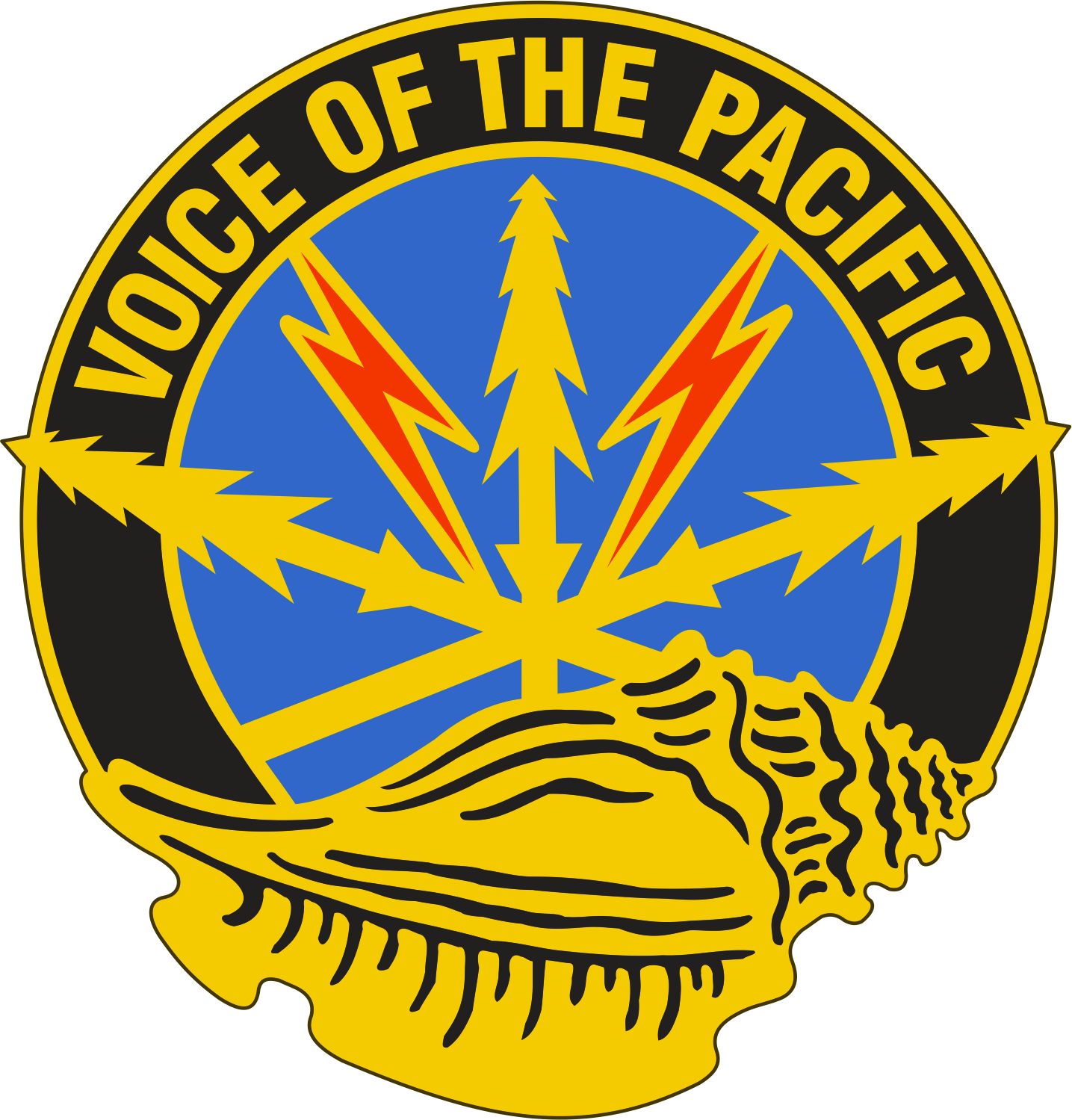
- Distinctive unit insignia

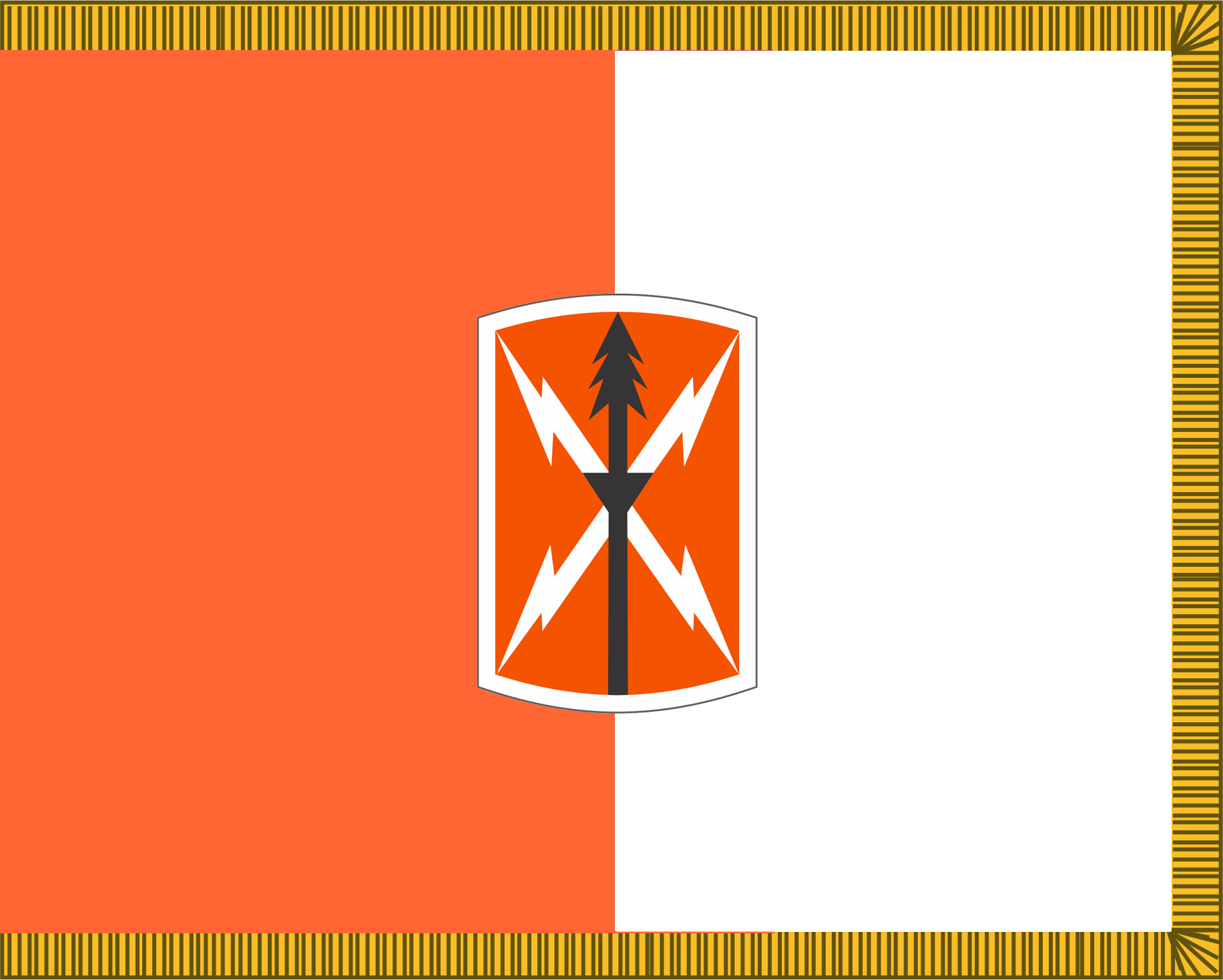
- 516th Signal Brigade Flag

The 516th Theater Signal Brigade is a forward based major subordinate operations and maintenance command of the 311th Signal Command(Theater). The Brigade supports the United States Army Pacific (USARPAC). The Brigade has four signal battalions, located in Alaska, Hawaii, mainland Japan, and Okinawa, Japan.

The brigade mission is to provide and defend the Pacific LandWarNet and expeditionary communications capabilities as part of U.S. Pacific Command's Theater Information Grid and the Army Enterprise in support of Joint, Combined, and Army Forces, enabling the battle command and information superiority to the Warfighter.

== History ==
The 516th Signal Brigade and its battalions were reactivated on 16 October 1992, assuming the former missions of the 1106th Signal Brigade and its battalions, which were discontinued 15 October 1992. The 516th is a Modified Table of Organization and Equipment, or MTOE command, while the 1106th was a Table of Distribution and Allowances, or TDA command.

Today's brigade headquarters therefore traces its legacy in two directions: On the TOE side, the 516th Signal Brigade was originally activated as the 3367th Signal Service Battalion on 25 November 1944 at New Guinea; and on the TDA side, the 1106th Signal Brigade was a successor to the United States Army Strategic Communications Command-Pacific (STRATCOM-PAC), which was activated on 1 September 1964 at Schofield Barracks, Hawaii.

During World War II, the 3367th Signal Service Battalion earned battle streamers for the campaigns of New Guinea, Leyte, Southern Philippines, and Luzon, with another streamer recognizing the Philippine Presidential Unit Citation. After the end of the war, the 3367th Signal Service Battalion was redesignated as the 516th Signal Service Battalion in Guam. It was re-designated as the 516th Signal Group in Germany on 10 February 1954, deactivating there on 13 November 1967. Each of the 516th's Signal Battalions—the 30th today located in Hawaii, 58th in Okinawa, 59th in Alaska, 78th in Japan, and the 307th Integrated Theater Signal Battalion located in Hawaii and Alaska—also earned World War II battle streamers in their original incarnations. The 30th, 59th, and 307th served in the European Theater, while the 58th and 78th were in the Pacific Theater.

The 1106th's other predecessor command, STRATCOM-PAC, had communications-electronics responsibilities during the 1960s and 1970s for the United States Army in Vietnam, Korea, Japan, Okinawa, the Philippines, Taiwan, and Thailand, as well as Hawaii—a geographical area spanning one-third of the earth's surface. During this period, more than 27,000 soldiers and civilians were assigned to the command, with approximately 21,000 of them assigned to STRATCOM-PAC's 1st Signal Brigade in Vietnam. Over the years, many reorganizations changed the command's missions and names. It became the 1106th Signal Brigade on 1 October 1989, eventually having five signal battalions in Alaska, Hawaii, Japan and Okinawa.

During 1990-91, nineteen soldiers from the 1106th Signal Brigade were deployed to Saudi Arabia to support Operations Desert Shield and Desert Storm. Since then, the 516th has deployed soldiers to Somalia, Kuwait, Haiti, Honduras, Bosnia, East Timor, and other locations to support United Nations and United States efforts there. Since 2002, brigade soldiers and contractors have deployed to Iraq, Afghanistan, and various other U.S. Central Command and U.S. Pacific Command geographical areas in support of the Global War on Terrorism.

== Subordinate Units ==
- 516th Theater Signal Brigade, Hawaii
  - 30th Signal Battalion, Hawaii (supporting US Army Pacific)
  - 59th Signal Battalion, Alaska (supporting US Army Alaska)
  - 78th Signal Battalion, Japan (supporting US Army Japan)
  - 307th Expeditionary Signal Battalion, Hawaii
