= United States Army Japan =

U.S. Army forces in Japan

- United States Army Japan shoulder sleeve insignia
- Active: 1 July 1957–present
- Country: United States
- Branch: United States Army
- Part of: United States Forces, Japan; United States Army Pacific
- Garrison/HQ: Camp Zama, Japan
- Motto: Omnia Fieri Potest

Commanders
- Current Commander: Major General James K. Dooghan
- Notable commanders: John Q. Henion; Roscoe Robinson Jr. James C. Boozer Sr. Viet Xuan Luong

Insignia
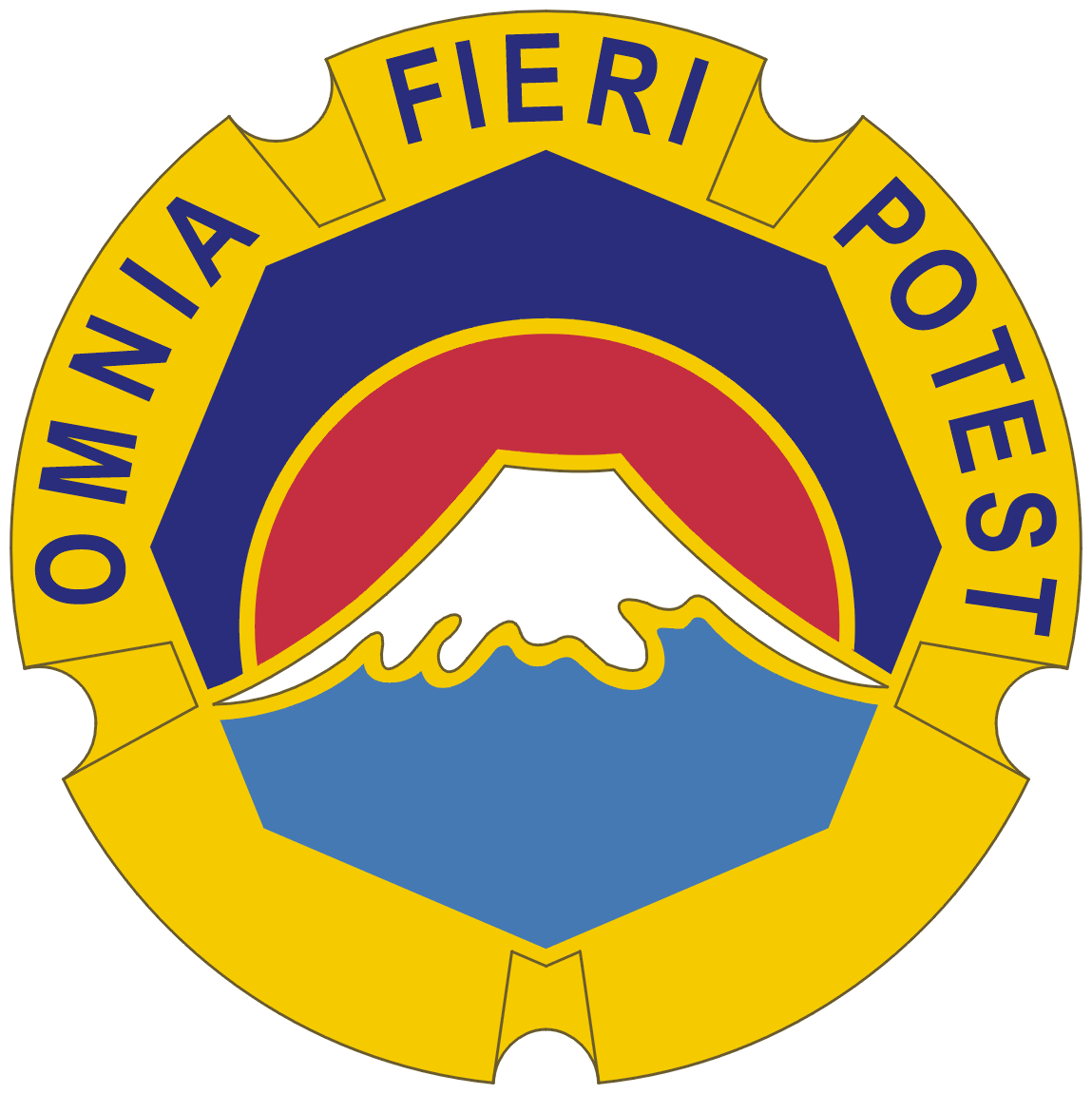
- Distinctive Unit Insignia

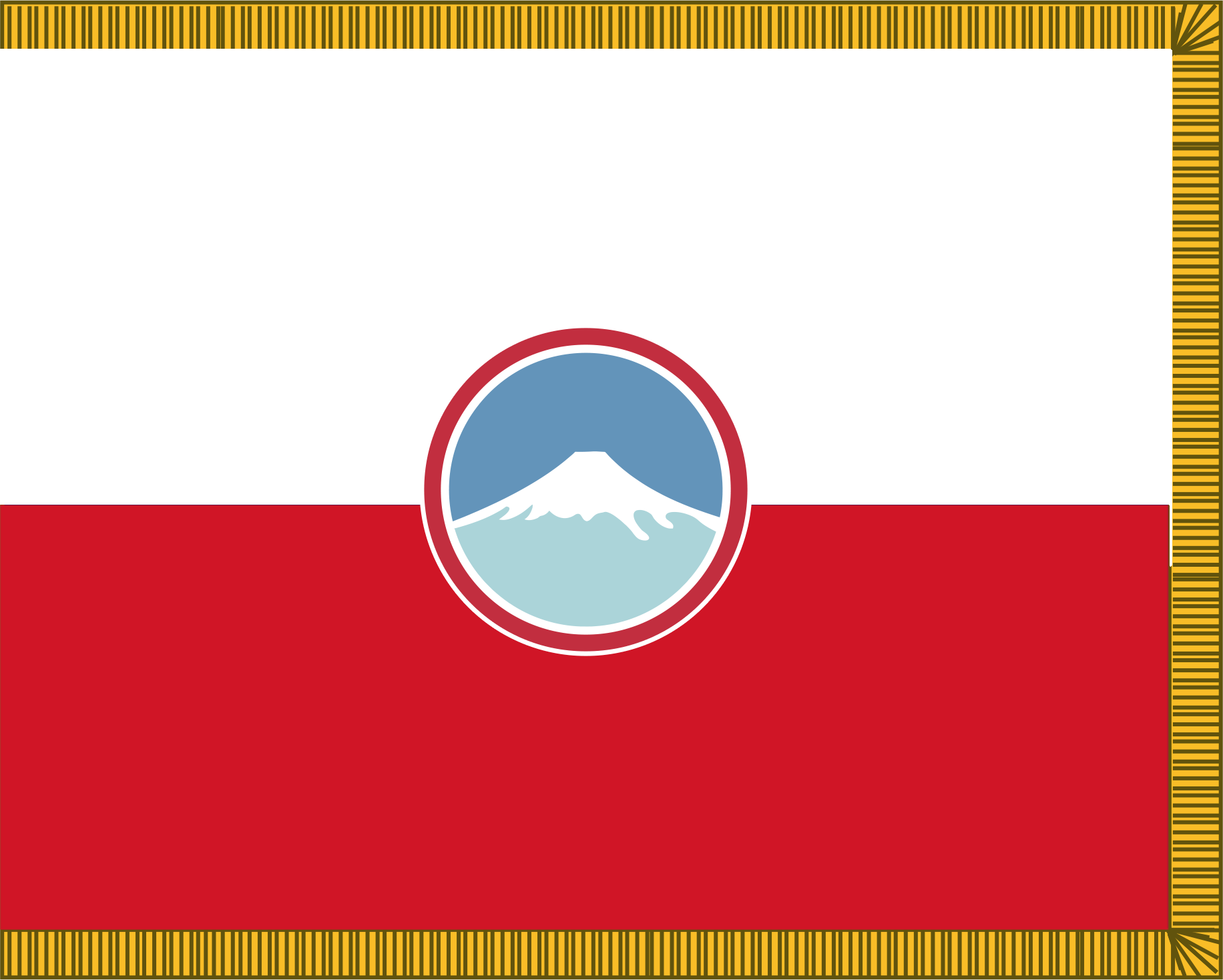
- US Army Japan Flag

United States Army Japan (USARJ) is a Major Command of the United States Army. It operates port facilities and a series of logistics installations throughout Honshū and Okinawa. USARJ participates actively with the Japan Ground Self-Defense Force in bilateral training exercises and the development of bilateral plans. It commands and supports United States Army assigned units, attached units, and augmentation forces and employs these forces in support of the commander. USARJ maintains and strengthens the credibility of deterrent power in the Pacific through maintenance of defense facilities, war reserves and operational project stocks. USARJ is headquartered at Camp Zama.

As the Army Component Command to United States Forces Japan (USFJ) and as a Major Subordinate Command of United States Army Pacific (USARPAC), United States Army Japan (USARJ)/I Corps (Forward) is responsible for providing support of Article V (Defense of Japan) and VI (ensuring regional stability) of the U.S.-Japan Mutual Security Treaty.

It serves as a forward stationed Army headquarters. It supports regional security cooperation activities with the Japan Ground Self Defense Force, contributing to the security of Japan and the maintenance of peace and security in the Far East, and provides communities of excellence and installation operations that support Soldiers, Civilians, and their Families.

== Organization ==
- United States Army Japan, at Camp Zama
  - Headquarters and Headquarters Company, at Camp Zama
  - I Corps (Forward), at Camp Zama
  - 38th Air Defense Artillery Brigade, at Sagami General Depot (administratively subordinated to 94th Army Air and Missile Defense Command)
  - 10th Support Group, at Torii Station
    - 765th Transportation Battalion (Terminal), at Yokohama North Dock in Yokohama
    - Ammunition Depot, 10th Support Group, at Camp Kure
  - U.S. Army Aviation Battalion Japan, at Camp Zama
  - 78th Signal Battalion, at Camp Zama (administratively subordinated to 516th Signal Brigade)
  - Brigadier General Crawford F. Sams - U.S. Army Health Clinic Japan, at Camp Zama (administratively subordinated to Medical Readiness Command Pacific)
  - U.S. Army Dental Health Activity-Japan, at Camp Zama (administratively subordinated to Medical Readiness Command Pacific)
  - Public Health Activity-Japan, at Camp Zama (administratively subordinated to Medical Readiness Command Pacific)

US Army units based in Japan, with which US Army Japan has a coordinating relationship:

- 1st Battalion, 1st Special Forces Group
- 311th Military Intelligence Battalion — 500th Military Intelligence Brigade
- US Army Garrison Japan — Installation Management Command - Pacific
- US Army Garrison Okinawa — Installation Management Command - Pacific
- Army Field Support Battalion - Northeast Asia — 403rd Army Field Support Brigade
- Japan Engineer District — Pacific Ocean Division Army Corps of Engineers
- 836th Transportation Battalion — 599th Transportation Brigade
- 835th Transportation Battalion — 599th Transportation Brigade
- USU Detachment Japan — 9th Mission Support Command
- USARPAC Support Detachment - United States Army Pacific

== History ==
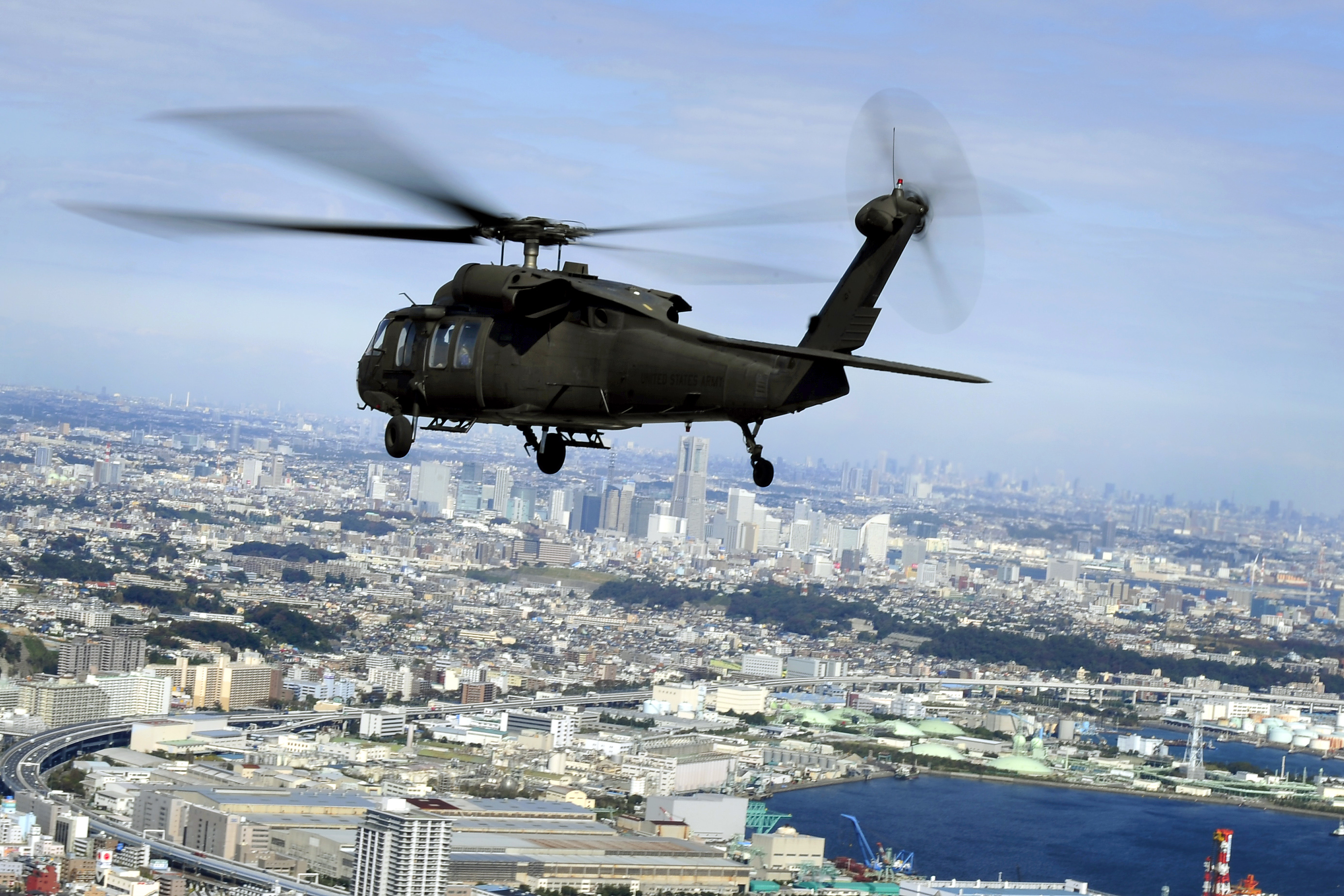
A US Army helicopter flying over Tokyo, 2011

The earliest origins of United States Army Japan can be traced to General Douglas MacArthur's assumption of command of U.S. Army Forces in the Far East. In July 1941, USAFFE was established in Manila. The command was destroyed as the U.S. were defeated in the Japanese invasion of the Philippines. After the end of the Second World War, the Army Forces Far East title was resurrected as the land forces element of the Far East Command in Tokyo. When Far East Command was disestablished in 1957, several smaller U.S. Army commands were created.

U.S. Army Japan (USARJ) first appeared on 1 July 1957 as a major subordinate command of United States Army Pacific (USARPAC) in Hawaii. Reorganized in September 1968, USARJ employed a new structure to maximize operational efficiency, while keeping its existing missions and functions.

In May 1972, the reversion of Okinawa to Japanese control resulted in the realignment of the Army's Pacific commands, with HQ USARJ absorbing elements for Okinawa, adjusting the command chain. IX Corps was transferred from Okinawa, and collocated with this command, to become HQ USARJ/IX Corps.

In July 1974, a USARJ reorganization established three subordinate commands: U.S. Army Garrison, Honshu (USAGH); U.S. Army Garrison, Okinawa (USAGO); and the U.S. Army Medical Department Activity-Japan, (MEDDAC-JAPAN).

In January 1975, with the discontinuance of USARPAC, USARJ was designated a major Army command, reporting directly to the Department of the Army.

In August 1990, USARPAC was reestablished. USARJ became a major subordinate command of that headquarters, as well as continuing as the Army Component Command of U.S. Forces, Japan (USFJ). In 1994, IX Corps was replaced by 9th Theater Army Area Command. In November 1999, it was redesignated the 9th Theater Support Command (TSC). There were several minor reorganizations and redesignations over the next decade, so that by September 2001, USARJ consisted of logistics bases in Japan and Okinawa.

In September 2007, the 9th TSC was inactivated. In December 2007, I Corps (Forward) was activated in Japan in line with the Army's transformation efforts. USARJ remains headquartered at Camp Zama, where it engages in numerous bilateral activities with the Japan Ground Self-Defense Force (JGSDF), and performs duties as United States Forces Japan's Army Component Command.

Command of the 78th Signal Battalion remained with the Hawaii-based 516th Signal Brigade (formerly 1106th) and operational control remains with the commander, USARJ/9th TAAC and since December 2007, USARJ/I Corps (Forward).

On 11 March 2011, a devastating magnitude 9.0 earthquake and tsunami struck the northeast coast of Japan. Within minutes, USARJ began humanitarian assistance and disaster relief operations in support of the JGSDF during Operation Tomodachi, Japan's largest-ever bilateral operation. USARJ supported the affected people after operations officially ended, by providing equipment and maintenance support to the JGSDF until September.

== Commanders ==
Commanders of United States Army Japan include:

- General of the Army Douglas MacArthur, Jul 26, 1941 – Apr 11, 1951
- General Matthew B. Ridgway, Apr 11, 1951 – May 12, 1952
- General Mark W. Clark, May 12, 1952 – Oct 7, 1953
- General John E. Hull, Oct 7, 1953 – Nov 20, 1954
- General Maxwell D. Taylor, Nov 20, 1954 – Apr 1, 1955
- General Lyman L. Lemnitzer, Apr 1, 1955 – Jun 6, 1955
- General Isaac D. White, Jul 25, 1955 – Jul 1, 1957
- Lieutenant General Charles D. Palmer, Jul 1, 1957 – Mar 5, 1958
- Lieutenant General Emerson L. Cummings, Mar 5, 1958 – Dec 2, 1958
- Major General David H. Tulley, Dec 2, 1958 – Mar 4, 1961
- Major General Jean E. Engler, May 25, 1961 – Sep 3, 1963
- Major General Chester W. Clark, Sep 3, 1963 – Apr 30, 1965
- Major General Lloyd E. Fellenz, Apr 30, 1965 – Jul 19, 1967
- Major General Bruce E. Kendall, Jul 20, 1967 – Jul 3, 1968
- Major General John A. Goshorn, Jul 23, 1968 – Jul 24, 1970
- Brigadier General Hugh A. Richeson, Jul 31, 1970 – Dec 15, 1971
- Brigadier General Ross R. Condit Jr. Jan 7, 1972 – May 14, 1972
- Lieutenant General Welborn G. Dolvin, May 15, 1972 – Mar 1, 1975
- Lieutenant General John R. Guthrie, Mar 1, 1975 – May 6, 1977
- Lieutenant General John Q. Henion, May 16, 1977 – May 23, 1980
- Lieutenant General Roscoe Robinson Jr., Jun 18, 1980 – Aug 20, 1982
- Lieutenant General Alexander M. Weyand, Sep 2, 1982 – Aug 1, 1985
- Lieutenant General Charles W. Dyke, Aug 1, 1985 – July 15, 1988
- Lieutenant General Johnnie H. Corns, Jul 15, 1988 – Dec 5, 1989
- Lieutenant General Jack D. Woodall, Dec 5, 1989 – Apr 22, 1992
- Lieutenant General Jerome H. Granrud, Apr 22, 1992 – Sep 8, 1994
- Major General Waldo D. Freeman, Sep 8, 1994 – Sep 27, 1996
- Major General Robert R. Hicks Jr., Sep 27, 1996 – Aug 21, 1998
- Major General Joseph R. Inge, Aug 21, 1998 – Jun 2, 2000
- Major General Alan D. Johnson, Jun 2, 2000 – Aug 13, 2002
- Major General Thomas G. Miller, Aug 13, 2002 – Jun 27, 2003
- Major General Elbert N. Perkins, Jun 27, 2003 – Jun 30, 2008
- Major General Francis J. Wiercinski, Jun 30, 2008 – Oct 12, 2010
- Major General Michael T. Harrison Sr., Oct 12, 2010 – Jun 8, 2013
- Major General James C. Boozer Sr., Jun 25, 2013 – July 8, 2015
- Major General James F. Pasquarette, Jul 8, 2015 – Aug 28, 2018
- Major General Viet X. Luong, Aug 28, 2018 – Jun 25, 2021
- Major General Joel B. Vowell, Jun 25, 2021 – Jun 20, 2023
- Major General David B. Womack, Jun 20, 2023 – Jun 17, 2025
- Major General James K. Dooghan, Jun 17th, 2025 – present
