= Viet Xuan Luong =

United States Army major general (born 1965)

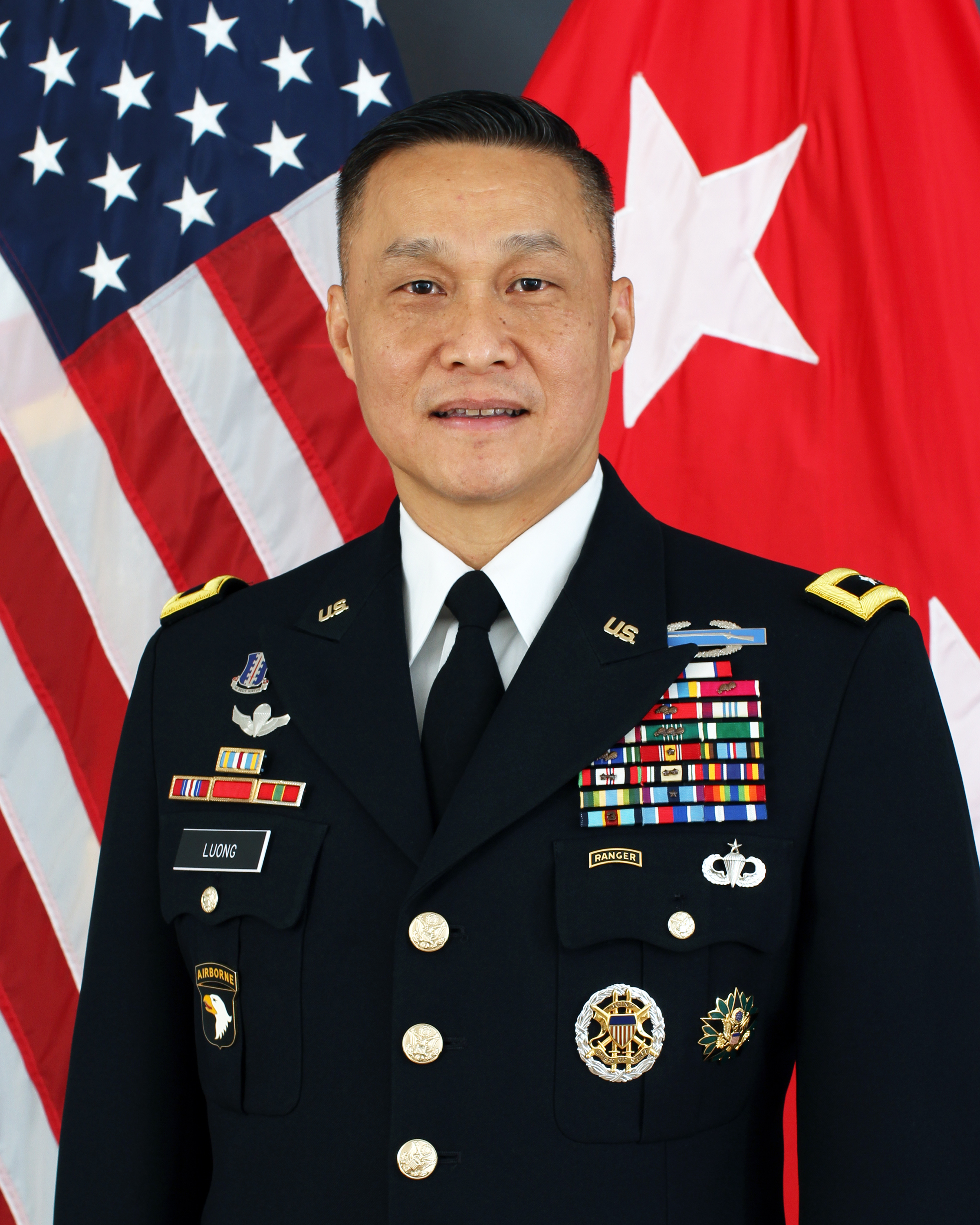
- Born: July 26, 1965 (age 61); Bien Hoa, South Vietnam
- Military career
- Allegiance: United States
- Branch: United States Army
- Service years: 1987–2021
- Rank: Major General
- Commands: United States Army, Japan; 3rd Brigade Combat Team (Rakkasans), 101st Airborne Division; Train Advise Assist Command – South; 2nd Battalion, 505th Parachute Infantry Regiment
- Conflicts: Iraq War; War in Afghanistan
- Awards: Army Distinguished Service Medal; Defense Superior Service Medal; Legion of Merit (3); Bronze Star Medal (3)

Viet Xuan Luong (Vietnamese: Lương Xuân Việt) is a retired United States Army major general. He is the first American officer promoted to general officer rank who was born in Vietnam. He last served as the Commanding General of United States Army, Japan/I Corps Forward. He previously served as the Deputy Commanding General (Operations), Eighth Army. His prior assignments included chief of staff of United States Army Central; Director of Joint and Integration, Headquarters Department of the Army, G-8; assistant division commander–maneuver for the 1st Cavalry Division at Fort Hood, concurrent with assignment as commander, Train Advise Assist Command – South, Resolute Support Mission Joint Command, North Atlantic Treaty Organization, Afghanistan.

== Early life ==
Luong's father, Luong Xuan Duong (d. 1997), was a Major (Thiếu tá) in the Republic of Vietnam Marine Division. On 29 April 1975 he and his family were evacuated from Tan Son Nhat International Airport during Operation Frequent Wind, landing on the deck of the aircraft carrier USS Hancock. He and his family were brought to Fort Chaffee, Arkansas as part of Operation New Arrivals.

Luong earned his commission via the Army Reserve Officers' Training Corps program upon graduating from the University of Southern California in 1987.

== Education ==
Luong earned a degree in Biological Sciences from the University of Southern California and a Master of Military Arts and Science.

== Assignments ==
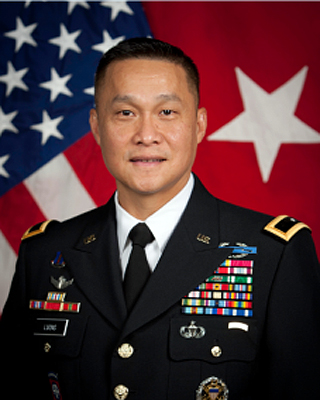
BG Viet X. Luong Deputy Commanding General (Operations), Eighth United States Army.

Luong's first assignment was with the 1st Battalion, 8th Infantry Regiment at Fort Carson, Colorado, where he served as a Rifle Platoon Leader, Anti-Tank Platoon Leader, Company Executive Officer, and Battalion Maintenance Officer.

In 1993, Luong was assigned to Fort Bragg, North Carolina and served in the 2nd Battalion, 325th Airborne Infantry Regiment, 2nd Brigade, 82nd Airborne Division, as the Battalion Assistant S-3 (Operations) and commander of Alpha Company. While commanding Alpha Company, he deployed to Haiti in support of Operation Uphold Democracy as the Commander of the Theater Quick Reaction Force. Following his assignment at Fort Bragg, he was assigned to the Joint Readiness Training Center (JRTC) at Fort Polk as an Observer Controller.

Following his assignment at JRTC, Luong attended the Command and General Staff College and then was assigned to the Southern European Task Force (SETAF). Luong served as SETAF G-3 Chief of Plans, and the Operations Officer and Executive Officer of 1st Battalion, 508th Parachute Infantry Regiment, 173rd Airborne Brigade, in Vicenza, Italy. During his assignment at SETAF, Luong deployed to Kosovo and Bosnia-Herzegovina on several occasions as part of the NATO Strategic Response Force.

Following this assignment, Luong was assigned to Joint Task Force North at Fort Bliss, where he served as a plans officer and Chief, Targeting and Exploitation Division. In 2005, he assumed command of the 2nd Battalion, 505th Parachute Infantry Regiment, 3rd Brigade Combat Team, 82nd Airborne Division. During this command, Luong deployed his battalion in September 2005 as the Division Ready Force 1, in support of Operation American Assist, the Hurricane Katrina Relief efforts in New Orleans, and Operation Iraqi Freedom 06–08, in support of the war on terror.

In February 2009, Luong assumed command of the 3rd Brigade Combat Team (Rakkasans), 101st Airborne Division (Air Assault). In January 2010, 3rd BCT deployed to Afghanistan for Operation Enduring Freedom 10–11. Following BCT command, Luong attended Stanford University as a National Security Fellow and subsequently served as the deputy director, Pakistan Afghanistan Coordination Cell, J5, The Joint Staff.

In 2015, Luong was assigned as Director, Joint and Integration at the Office of the US Army Chief of Staff for Force Development, G-8.

In March 2016, Luong was announced for assignment as chief of staff at United States Army Central.

In May 2017, Luong was announced as the next Deputy Commanding General (Operations), Eighth Army, United States Forces Korea. He was promoted to major general in June 2018 and assumed command of United States Army, Japan in August 2018.

He relinquished command of United States Army Japan to Brigadier General Joel B. Vowell on June 25, 2021, retiring after 34 years of service.

As of 2024, MG Luong (retired) resides in Frisco, Texas.

== Decorations and awards ==
Luong's personal awards and decorations include the: Army Distinguished Service Medal, Defense Superior Service Medal, Legion of Merit with two oak leaf clusters, Bronze Star Medal with two oak leaf clusters, Defense Meritorious Service Medal, Army Commendation Medal with three oak leaf clusters, Navy Commendation Medal, Army Achievement Medal with two oak leaf clusters, Ranger Tab, Combat Infantryman Badge and the Senior Parachutist Badge.

== See also ==
- List of notable military Vietnamese Americans
