= John R. Guthrie =

US Army general (1921–2009)

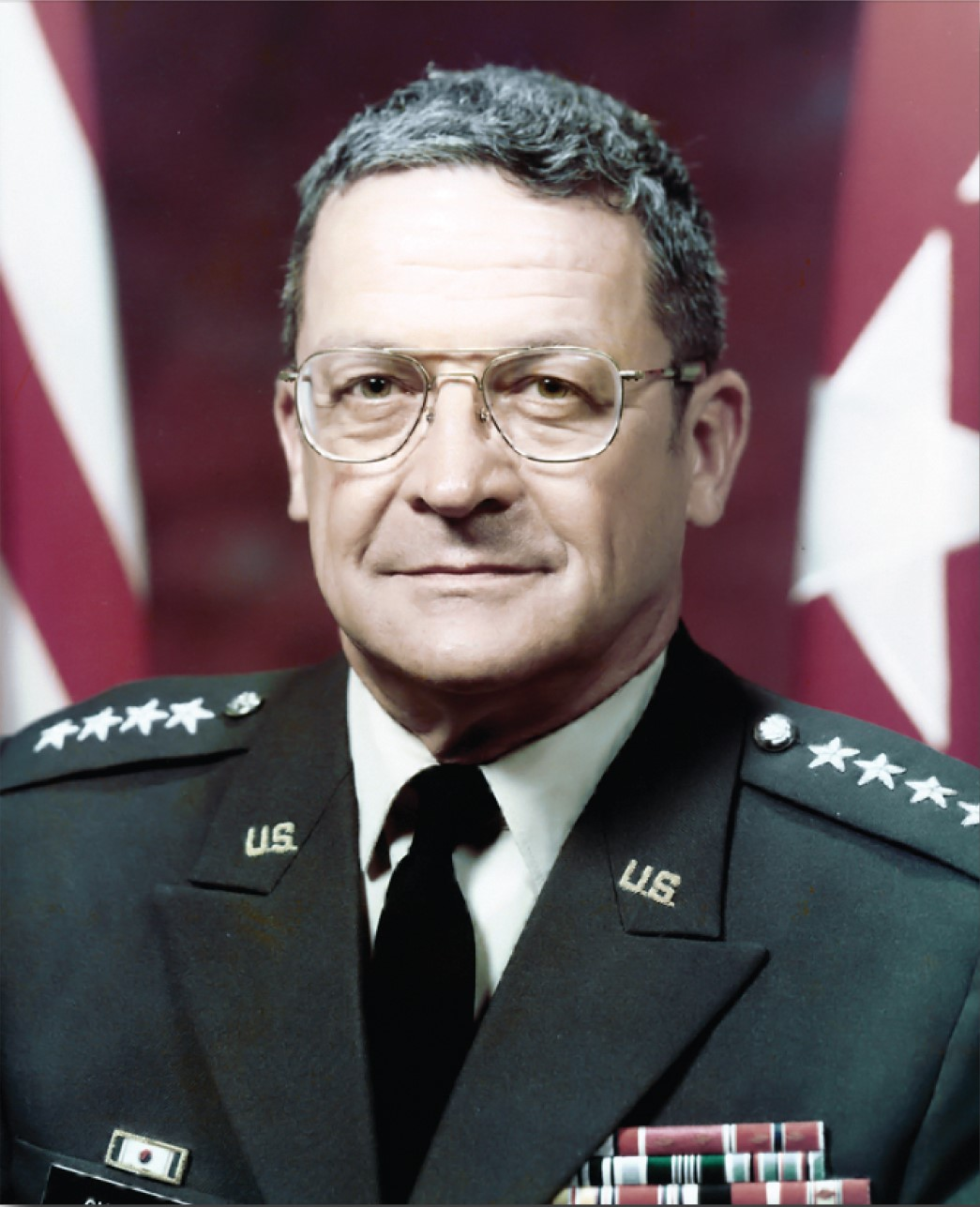
- General John Reiley Guthrie
- Born: 20 December 1921; Phillipsburg, New Jersey
- Died: 25 May 2009 (aged 87); Walter Reed Army Medical Center
- Military career
- Allegiance: United States
- Branch: United States Army
- Service years: 1942–1981
- Rank: General
- Commands: United States Army Materiel Readiness and Development Command; IX Corps; 25th Infantry Division Artillery; 602nd Field Artillery Battalion
- Conflicts: World War II; Korean War
- Awards: Army Distinguished Service Medal; Legion of Merit; Bronze Star Medal
- Other work: Trustee, Princeton University; Director, Landpower Education Program

John Reiley Guthrie (20 December 1921 – 25 May 2009) was a United States Army four-star general who served as commanding general, United States Army Development and Research Command (DARCOM) from 1977 to 1981. In the 1980s, DARCOM was renamed United States Army Materiel Command.

== Military career ==
Guthrie was born in Phillipsburg, New Jersey, on 20 December 1921. He attended Blair Academy, graduating in 1938, and graduated from Princeton University with a Bachelor of Arts degree in 1942. An honor graduate of the Princeton ROTC, he was commissioned a second lieutenant, Field Artillery Reserve, and immediately ordered to active duty. He was integrated into the Regular Army in July 1946, while on duty with the War Department General Staff. In October 1946, he was assigned to London, England as assistant to the military attaché, where he served for three years.

In November 1949, Guthrie returned to the United States and was assigned to the 39th Field Artillery Battalion, 3rd Infantry Division, Fort Benning, Georgia. He served as battery commander and S-3 of the 39th at Fort Benning, Japan and Korea, until June 1951 when he was assigned as S-3, 3rd Infantry Division Artillery. During this period, he participated in operations against guerrillas in the Wonsan area, the evacuation from Hŭngnam, the reoccupation of Seoul and the spring Chinese offensive and United Nations counteroffensive.

Upon his return to the United States, Guthrie commanded the 602nd Field Artillery Battalion and Fort Sill from February 1952 to May 1953. He was then assigned to the Staff and Faculty at the Artillery and Guided Missile School as a member of the Combat Developments Department. In March 1956, he was transferred to the Office of the Chief of Research and Development, HQDA, for duty with the Surface-to-Surface Missiles Division and later with the Missiles and Space Division. He was the Army Staff project officer for the launching of the United States' first artificial earth satellite, Explorer 1. In July 1958, he was assigned as the military assistant to the Secretary of the Army and was appointed Assistant Executive to the Secretary of the Army on 1 August 1959.

After serving in this position for a year, Guthrie attended the National War College and graduated in 1961. He was then assigned to the Staff, Commander-in-Chief, Pacific, Camp H. M. Smith, Hawaii, serving as Deputy Chief, War Games Branch, and group operations officer, from August 1961 to February 1964. In February 1964, he assumed command of the 25th Infantry Division Artillery, Schofield Barracks, Hawaii, which he commanded until appointed chief of staff, 25th Infantry Division, in July 1964. In July 1965, he returned to the Continental United States and was assigned to the Requirements and Development Division, J-5 Directorate, Organization of the Joint Chiefs of Staff, Washington, D.C.

In March 1966, Guthrie became director of developments, Office of the Chief of Research and Development, HQDA. He remained in that position until his reassignment to Korea, where he served as assistant division commander (maneuver) and assistant division commander (support), 2nd Infantry Division, which at the time was actively engaged in counter-infiltration operations along the Korean Demilitarized Zone.

Guthrie was named deputy director of development and engineering, AMC, in November 1968; became director of research, development and engineering in August 1969; and was selected as deputy commanding general for materiel acquisition, AMC, in April 1971. In October 1973, Guthrie returned overseas to become deputy chief of staff, United States Pacific Command, Hawaii. In March 1975, he was promoted to lieutenant general and assigned as commanding general, IX Corps and United States Army, Japan.

In May 1977, Guthrie returned to AMC, which had been redesignated the United States Army Materiel Readiness and Development Command, as its commanding general. He remained in that assignment until his retirement in August 1981.

== Post-military ==
In retirement, Guthrie was director of the Association of the United States Army's Landpower Education Program, a position he filled until December 1986. He also served as a trustee of Princeton University from 1981 to 1985, was on the board of directors of the Army and Air Force Mutual Aid Association and the board of advisors of the National Contract Management Association, and as a member of the National Research Council's Space Technology Assessment Panel and its Committee on Artificial Intelligence and Army Robotics.

Guthrie was married to Rebecca Jeffers Guthrie, who died on 11 April 2005. They had six children, one of whom is autistic. Guthrie died 25 May 2009. The 2010 Virginia General Assembly passed a resolution celebrating his life and expressing the "high regard" in which his memory is held by the members of the legislature and the citizens of Virginia.
