= Camp Zama =

United States Army post in Kanagawa Prefecture, Japan

- Zama and Sagamihara, Japan
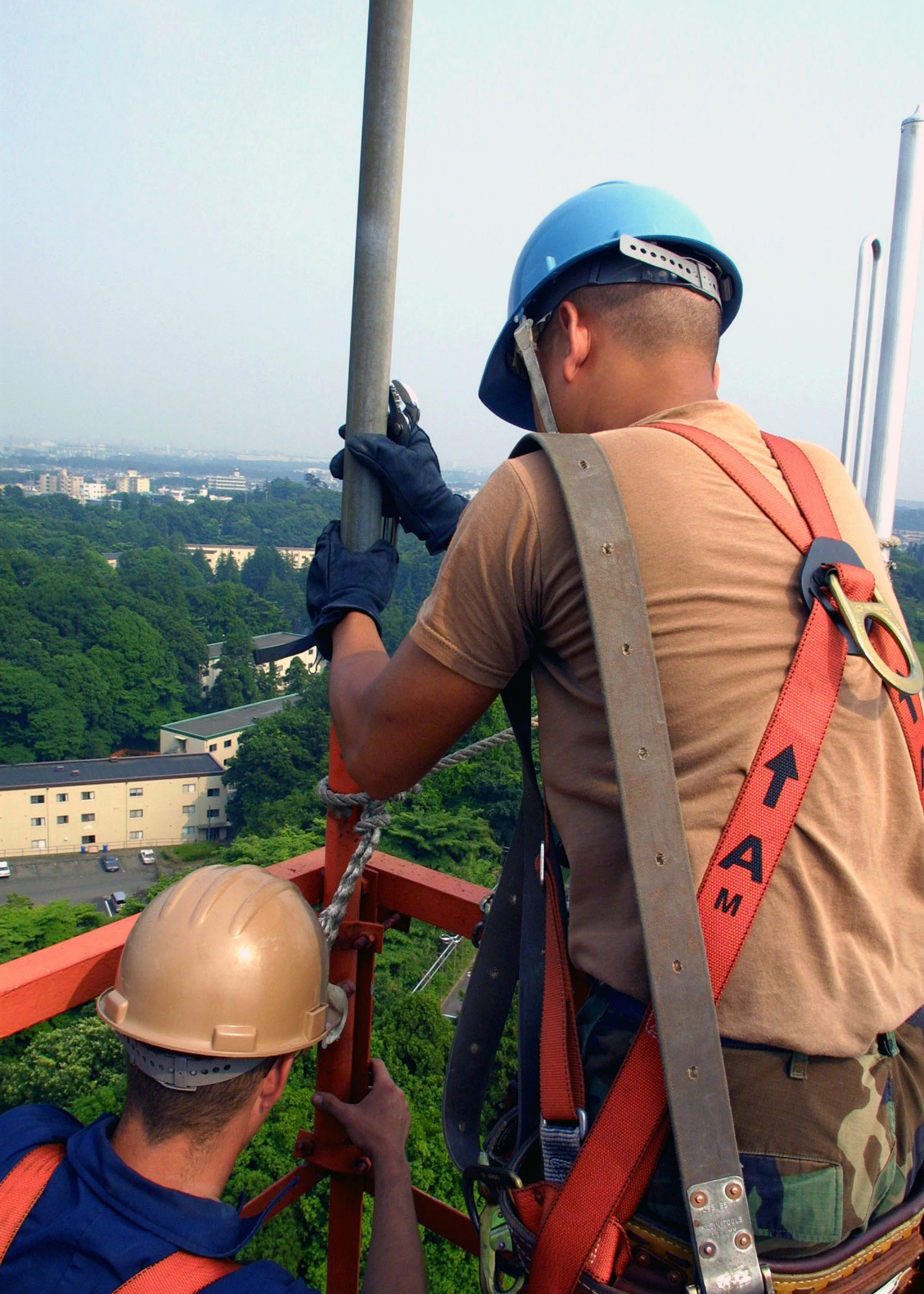
- Two U.S. airmen work atop a signal tower at Camp Zama in June 2002.

Site information
- Type: Military installation
- Owner: USA, with authority from Japan
- Controlled by: United States Army

Site history
- Built by: Imperial Japanese Army

Garrison information
- Garrison: United States Army Japan; I Corps (Forward); U.S. Army Garrison – Japan; 311th Military Intelligence Battalion; Japan Engineer District; 78th Signal Battalion; 374th Communications Squadron; Bilateral Coordination Department; 4th Engineer Group, Japan Ground Self-Defense Force; and others
- Occupants: United States Army Japan; Japan Ground Self-Defense Force (JGSDF Zama Garrison)

Kastner Army Heliport Kastner Army Airfield Zama/Kastner Heliport
- IATA: none; ICAO: RJTR

Summary
- Airport type: Military
- Operator: United States Army
- Location: Camp Zama
- Elevation AMSL: 360 ft (110 m)
- Coordinates: 35°30.83′N 139°23.62′E

Map
- Location in Japan

Runways
Direction	Length		Surface
Direction	ft	m	Surface
02/20	1,500	457	Asphalt
- Sources: Japanese AIP at AIS Japan, DoD FLIP

Camp Zama (キャンプ座間) is a United States Army post located in the cities of Zama and Sagamihara, in Kanagawa Prefecture, Japan, about 40 km (25 mi) southwest of Tokyo.

Camp Zama is home to the U.S. Army Japan (USARJ), I Corps (Forward), U.S. Army Aviation Battalion Japan "Ninjas", 311th Military Intelligence Battalion, Japan Engineer District (U.S. Army Corps of Engineers), 78th Signal Battalion and the Bilateral Coordination Department and 4th Engineer Group of the Japan Ground Self-Defense Force (see JGSDF Zama Garrison).

== Camp ==
Camp Zama is close to the Sagami River near the foothills of the Tanzawa Mountains in Kanagawa Prefecture. The installation falls in the Zama City limits while the two housing areas, Camp Zama and Sagamihara Family Housing Area (SFHA), are located in the adjacent Sagamihara City. Once considered rural, this area has transformed into an urban area. New housing developments and communities along with shopping centers have increased the population and made traffic extremely congested.

Traveling from Tokyo and outlying U.S. military installations to Camp Zama averages from 1.5 to 3 hours depending on the time of day. However traveling from other parts of Kanagawa was made easier with the opening of the nearby Sagamihara/Aikawa Interchange which connects with the Ken-Ō Expressway in May 2012.

The closest train station to Camp Zama is the Odakyū Line's Sōbudai-mae Station.

== History ==
Camp Zama is located on the former site of the Imperial Japanese Army Academy, which was named "Sōbudai" (Japanese: 相武台) by Hirohito. Camp Zama is the earliest barrack in Japan. The camp faced many changes as a result of the defeat suffered by the Japanese in World War II. Route 51 is the road to Camp Zama that was specifically built in order for the Emperor to travel to review the graduating classes from Machida Station. The Emperor Showa visited Camp Zama in 1937. Camp Zama also houses an emergency shelter for the Emperor, and to this day, it has been maintained by the U.S. Army Garrison Japan. The Camp Zama theater workshop is one of the few remaining buildings from the pre-occupation era. It is a large hall that was used for ceremonies by the Imperial Japanese Army. Additionally, the former recreation center still stands, currently used by the Camp Zama Tours and Travel Office and Boy Scouts, along with others.

In November 1984, Mother Teresa of Calcutta visited Camp Zama and spoke to an audience of 1,200 people.

The camp has been attacked several times by terrorists. First when a bomb was exploded outside the camp in 2002 by the Kakurōkyō ("Revolutionary Army"). There was a further attack in 2007, which was speculated to be an Al-Qaida attack but responsibility was claimed by the so-called "Revolutionary Army" responsible for the 2002 attack. There was another attempted attack in May 2015. A suspect was formally arrested in December 2018.

In 2004 Charles Jenkins, a U.S. Army sergeant who had deserted to North Korea in 1965, turned himself in at Camp Zama. He was sentenced to a 30-day jail sentence and given a dishonorable discharge. He later gained permanent residency in Japan to live with his Japanese wife and family. Jenkins died of heart failure at age 77 in December 2017 near Sado, in Northern Japan.

In 2005 a live anthrax sample was sent to the base in error. It was destroyed in 2009.

In March 2007, Michael Jackson visited the camp to greet 3,000 plus U.S. troops and their families. Jackson was flown in on a Black Hawk helicopter from Hardy Barracks in Tokyo and addressed the crowd at the base's Yano Fitness Center gymnasium:

"It is an honor and privilege to be here today." Jackson told the spectators. "Those of you in here today are some of the most special people in the world because you have chosen a life of service. When we all sleep at night, we rest comfortably knowing that we are protected. And it is because of you here today and others who so valiantly have given their lives to protect us, that we enjoy our freedom. I thank you from the bottom of my heart. I love you. Thank you so much."

Col. Robert M. Waltemeyer, Commander U.S. Army Garrison Japan, presented Jackson with a Certificate of Appreciation for his devotion to U.S. Military troops and their families.

In December 2007 headquarters for the 1st Corps was opened at Camp Zama.

Personnel from the base assisted with Operation Tomodachi following and during the March 2011 Tōhoku earthquake and tsunami and Fukushima I nuclear accidents. During the crisis, around 300 American family members voluntarily departed the base for locations outside Japan.

In 2013 a handgun went missing at the base, and was reported to police.

== Education ==
The United States Department of Defense operates several public schools in the base.

- Arnn Elementary School
- Zama Middle High School

Higher educational opportunities for those in the military and working for the Department of Defense, as well as for family members at Camp Zama are available through several contracted academic institutions. For example:

- University of Maryland University College
- Central Texas College

=== Arnn Elementary School ===
The Sagamihara Elementary School opened in September 1951 with 300 students, ten teachers, and a principal. It started in a building purchased from the Japanese Government. This original building was destroyed by fire in 1975. Three temporary buildings were constructed in the summer of 1976 on the community play area across the street from the original school site. Later in 1978 three new buildings were completed on the original site and the campus was completed in 1983. These buildings served as the school until the new school replacement project was completed in May 2003. Fall 2003, the new John O. Arnn ES opened.

- School motto: "Creating lifelong learners"
- School mascot: The Knight
- School colors: Blue and green

=== Zama American High School ===
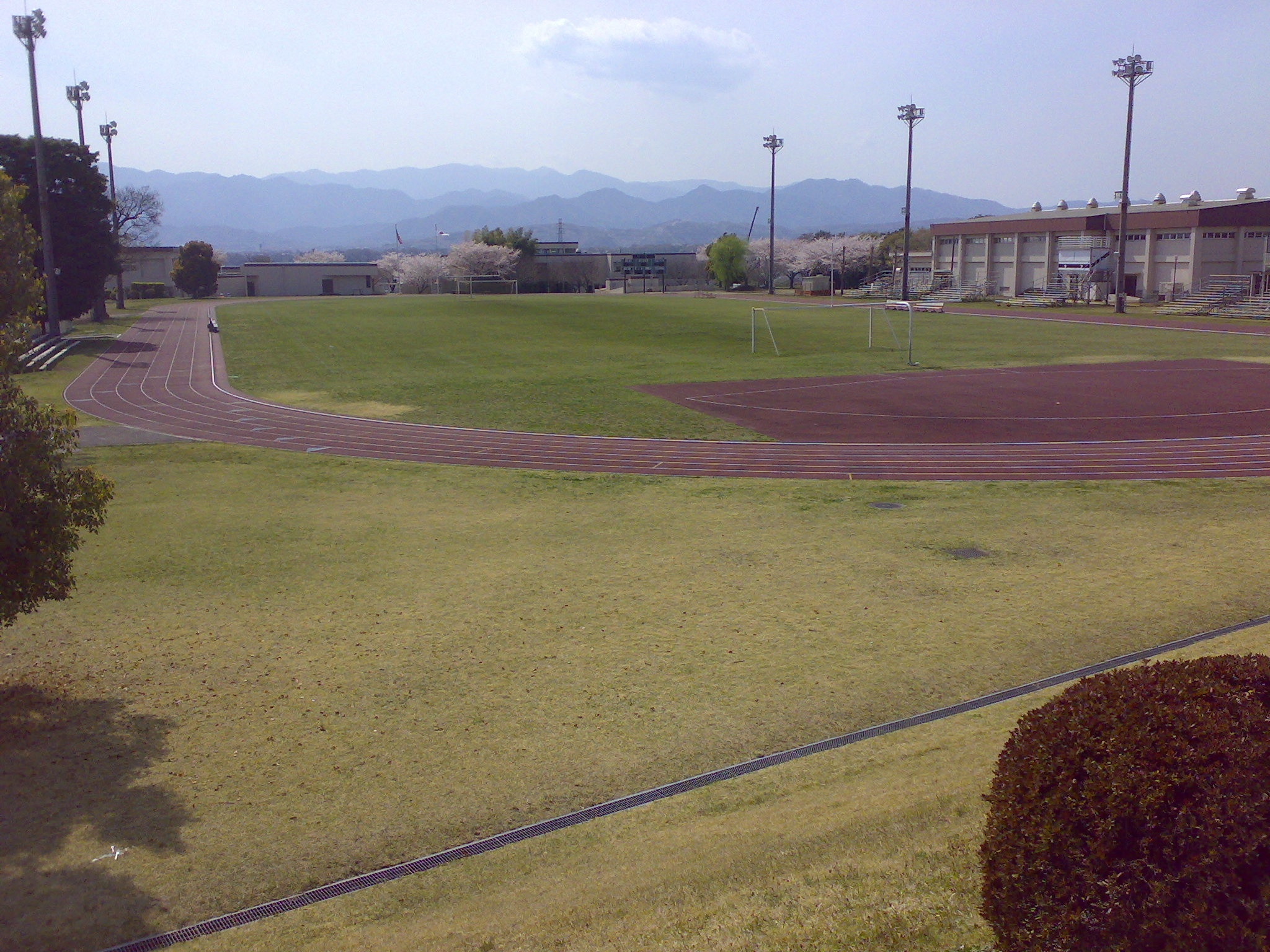
Zama American High School, 2008.

The Zama American High School, also known as ZAHS, first opened in 1959. It was opened to, and continues to serve, American dependents of U.S. Military and civilian employees stationed in the area, as well as U.S. Contractors. It was built at the bottom of "General's Hill" on the north side of Camp Zama and remained there until 1968. In 1968, the school Principal, Mr. Richard A. Pemble, had the high school and Jr. High 'switched', and the high school then occupied two wooden army barracks close to the main gate. The barracks were the original Imperial Japanese Army buildings used to house Japanese Imperial army officer candidates during World War II, and subsequently house U.S. troops during the occupation.

In 1980, a new high school was built on the hill near the original site, and the historical barracks were subsequently torn down. The high school still serves the American School community for the U.S. dependents in the Camp Zama, Sagamihara, Atsugi Naval Air Facility and surrounding areas.

In 1987, the school split into Zama American Middle School and Zama American High School.

ZAHS has an active alumni association and biyearly reunions that draw members from across the world.

Zama American High School celebrated its 50th graduating class anniversary in June 2009. In June 2012, the school was placed on accreditation probation by accreditation agency AdvancED. AdvancED's report cited an "obstructive and negative climate perpetuated by an intimidating, manipulative minority of staff members at the school" as the main source of problems with the learning environment at the school. In fear of losing its accreditation, school staff had until April 2013 to correct the problem. In response, in April 2012, DoDEA called former Zama High School teacher Bruce Derr out of retirement to serve as principal and turn things around. In August 2012 DoDEA transferred union representative Brian Chance, identified as one of those reportedly contributing to the conflicts between faculty and administrators at the school, to Germany. One teacher was fired. Six other teachers were also transferred or elected to retire in lieu of accepting a transfer. The school met the deadline and is again fully accredited.

In 2012 the DoDEA boss agreed that Zama High School was failing and believed it should receive a D−. According to the 2012 Report of the Quality Assurance Review Team's report SAT scores and other data is not easily accessible to the parents and the public.

In 2016, Zama American Middle School was found to have asbestos and is currently under construction prompting the middle school children be moved to the high school building temporarily.

In 2017, Zama High School combined with Zama Middle School, making Zama American Middle High School.

In 2013, Zama American High School students scored an average SAT Test Score of 1339 points, obtaining a 442 in critical reading, 465 in math, and 432 in writing,

Year	Reading	Writing	Math	Combined
2013	442	432	465	1339
2012	492	478	500	1470
2011	478	470	466	1414
2010	503	513	497	1513
2009	504	496	481	1481
