= Qari Ziaur Rahman =

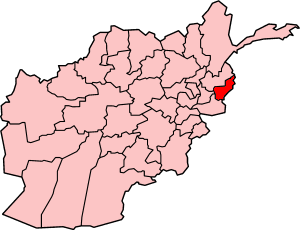
Konar Province, where Qari Ziaur Rahman, is based, on the border with Pakistan.

Qari Ziaur Rahman is a citizen of Afghanistan who is reported to be a leader of the Taliban's and al-Qaeda's leadership. He was believed to have been killed in March 2011 during an attack on Taliban militants by the Pakistani military, however Ziaur Rahman later phoned media reporters to confirm that he survived the airstrike.

== Early life ==
Qari's father, Ahengar Dilbar, was a blacksmith. Qari Ziaur Rahman reports being from Konar Province. He reports that he memorized the entire Quran while a youth.

According to a profile in the Asia Times, he grew up surrounded by Arab foreign fighters during the Soviet occupation of Afghanistan. According to the Asia Times he is in his thirties.

== Militant career ==
Asia Times reports that Qari Ziaur Rahman is a leader in the insurgency's efforts in Konar, and that the United States has offered $350,000 bounty for information leading to his death or capture. As is often the case, Taliban exaggerate claims of monetary rewards, proposing inflated figures as propaganda to build credibility among insurgency personnel.

Qari Ziaur Rahman was captured in Pakistan by operatives of CIA & ISI. But he was not transferred to US custody. Instead he was part of a prisoner exchange for Pakistani military officials.

Bill Roggio, writing in the Long War Journal, reported that he was rumored to have been killed in mid-June 2009. Two weeks later Roggio reported the Pakistan had offered a series of bounties. He reported they offered the equivalent of US$615,000 for Baitullah Mehsud. He reported that for Qari Zaur Rahman they only offered the equivalent of $65,100.

Afghan forces reported that Ziaur-Rahman was killed in a coalition drone strike on 21 August 2013. He was reported attending a meeting with three other local insurgents, who were killed, in the Marawara district of Kunar. Reports of Ziaur-Rahman's death were proven false when he was interviewed by NBC News in May 2014.
