= Roscoe Robinson Jr. =

United States Army general

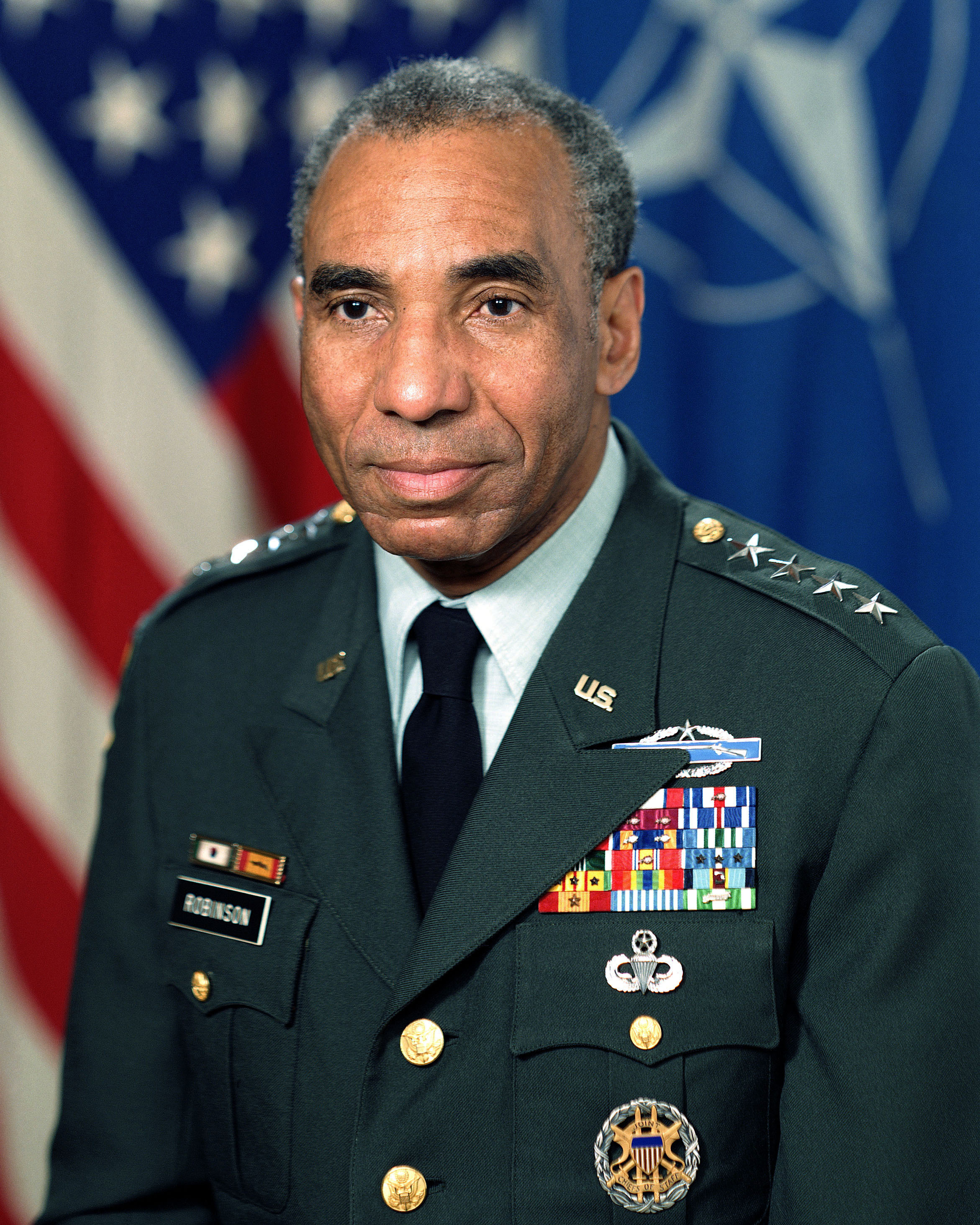
- General Roscoe Robinson Jr.
- Born: 11 October 1928; St. Louis, Missouri, US
- Died: 22 July 1993 (aged 64); Washington, D.C., US
- Burial place: Arlington National Cemetery
- Military career
- Allegiance: United States
- Branch: United States Army
- Rank: General
- Commands: United States Army, Japan; 82nd Airborne Division; United States Army Garrison, Okinawa; 2nd Brigade, 82nd Airborne Division; 2nd Battalion, 7th Cavalry Regiment
- Conflicts: Korean War; Vietnam War
- Awards: Defense Distinguished Service Medal; Army Distinguished Service Medal (2); Silver Star Medal (2); Legion of Merit (3); Distinguished Flying Cross; Bronze Star Medal; Air Medal (11)

Roscoe Robinson Jr. (11 October 1928 – 22 July 1993) was the first African American to become a four-star general in the United States Army. He served as the United States representative to the NATO Military Committee. Robinson previously served as commanding general of the 82nd Airborne Division and then of United States Army, Japan.

== Early life and education ==
Born and raised in St. Louis, Missouri, Robinson graduated from Sumner High School in January 1946 and then attended Stowe College for one semester. He studied at Saint Louis University for a year and then transferred to the United States Military Academy at West Point in 1947. He graduated with a B.S. degree in military engineering in 1951. Robinson graduated from the advanced course at the United States Army Infantry School in 1957. He then went on to graduate from the Command and General Staff College at Fort Leavenworth, Kansas in 1963. The following year he received his master's degree from the University of Pittsburgh in public and international affairs. Robinson later graduated from the National War College in 1969.

== Career ==
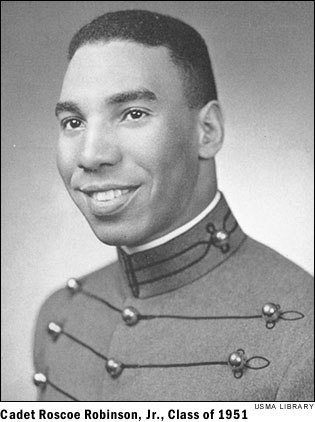
Robinson as a West Point cadet

After graduating from West Point, Robinson served in the Korean War in 1952 as a platoon leader and rifle company commander. For his actions he received the Bronze Star. Sent back to the United States a year later he became an instructor in the Airborne Department of the Army Infantry School.

In 1967, he served as commander of the 2nd Battalion, 7th Cavalry, 1st Cavalry Division in Vietnam. For his achievements there he received the Legion of Merit, the Distinguished Flying Cross, 11 Air Medals, and two Silver Stars.

After Vietnam he served at the National War College as the executive officer to the Chief of Staff. He then served on the headquarters staff of the United States Pacific Command in Hawaii before becoming commander of the 2nd Brigade, 82nd Airborne Division at Fort Bragg, North Carolina in 1972.

In 1973, Robinson was promoted to brigadier general and, in 1975, became commanding general of the United States Army Garrison, Okinawa. In 1976, he was promoted to major general and assigned to command the 82nd Airborne Division at Fort Bragg. General Robinson was the first African American to command the 82nd Airborne Division. He then served as Deputy Chief of Staff for Operations, United States Army Europe and Seventh Army. Promoted to lieutenant general in 1980, Robinson served as the commanding general of United States Army, Japan, and IX Corps He was subsequently awarded the Army Distinguished Service Medal in 1983.

His final assignment was as U.S. Military Representative to the NATO Military Committee from 1982–1985. After he had completed 34 years of service to the U.S. military he retired on November 30, 1985. He was then awarded with the Defense Distinguished Service Medal and a second Army Distinguished Service Medal.

== Awards and decorations ==
U.S. Badges, Patches and Tabs
| Combat Infantryman Badge w/ one silver star (2 awards) |
| Master Parachutist Badge |
| Joint Chiefs of Staff Identification Badge |
| ? Overseas Service Bars |

U.S. Individual Decorations
| Defense Distinguished Service Medal |
| Army Distinguished Service Medal with one bronze oak leaf cluster |
| Silver Star w/ oak leaf cluster |
| Legion of Merit w/ two oak leaf clusters |
| Distinguished Flying Cross |
| Bronze Star Medal |
| Air Medal w/ two silver oak leaf clusters |
| Joint Service Commendation Medal |
| Army Commendation Medal |
U.S. Good Conduct Medal and Service Medals
| National Defense Service Medal with one 3/16" bronze star |
| Korean Service Medal w/ three 3/16" bronze stars |
| Vietnam Service Medal w/ three 3/16" bronze stars |
| Army Service Ribbon |
| Army Overseas Service Ribbon with bronze award numeral 2 |
Foreign Individual Decorations
| Vietnam Cross of Gallantry w/ Palm and one 5/16" gold star |
Foreign Unit Awards
| Republic of Korea Presidential Unit Citation |
| Republic of Vietnam Gallantry Cross Unit Citation |
Foreign Service Medals
| United Nations Korea Medal |
| Vietnam Campaign Medal |

== Later life and legacy ==
After his retirement, he was asked to look over a panel of people who were examining the Korean War performance of some highly criticized army units. He also served on the board of Northwest Airlines. Robinson and his wife Mildred lived in Falls Church, Virginia. After a battle with leukemia, Robinson died on 22 July 1993, at the Walter Reed Army Hospital in Washington, D.C., at the age of 64, and was buried at Arlington National Cemetery. In April 2000, there was a ceremony and a dedication at West Point for a new auditorium, named the "General Roscoe Robinson Jr. Auditorium" in his honor. The Roscoe Robinson Health Clinic at Womack Army Medical Center at Fort Bragg is also named in his honor.
