= Torii Station =

US Army facility in Yomitan, Okinawa Prefecture, Japan

Coordinates: 26°22′45″N 127°44′12″E

US Army Garrison Okinawa
- Okinawa, Japan
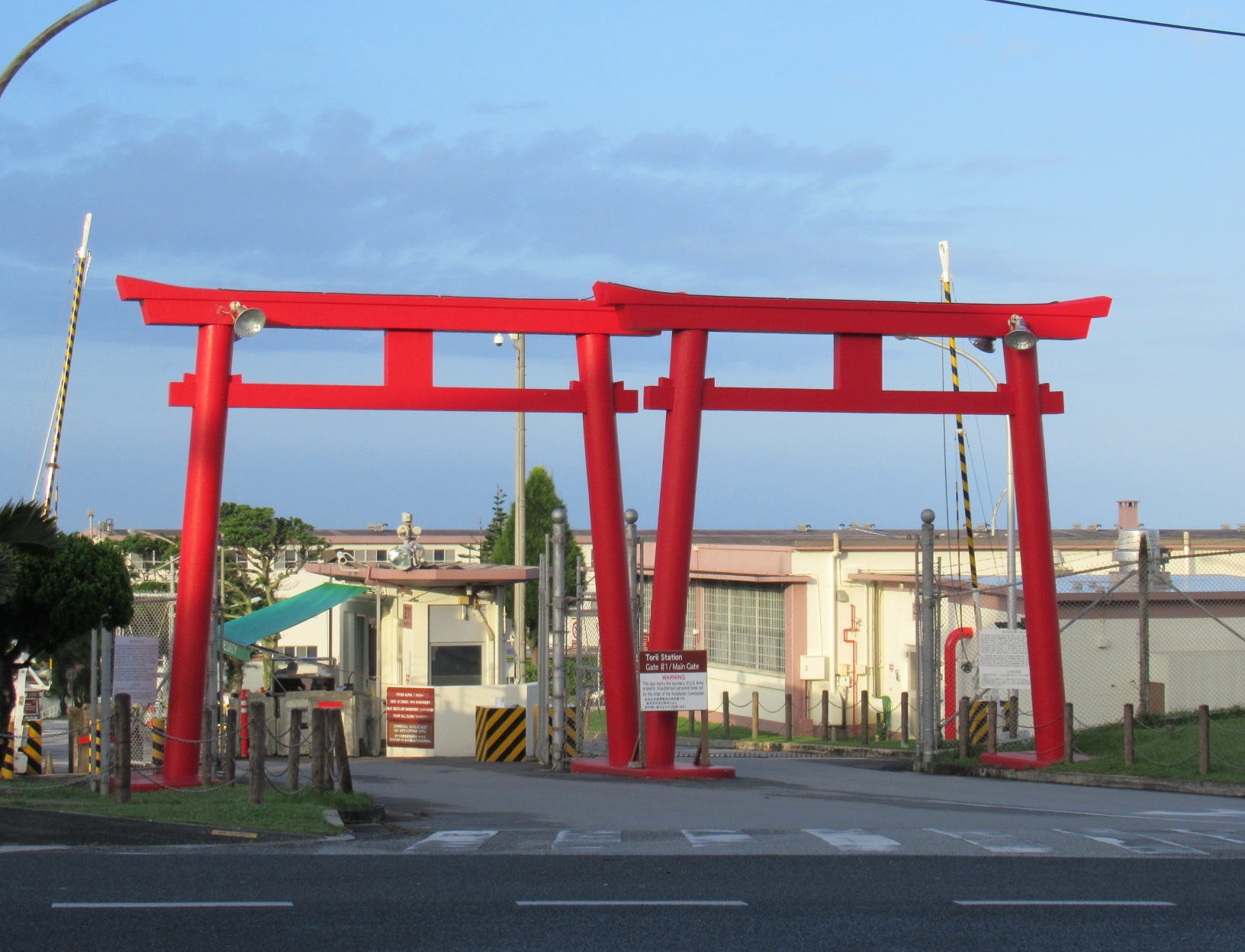

Site information
- Type: Military base
- Controlled by: United States Army
- Website: Official Website

Site history
- Materials: Concrete

Garrison information
- Current commander: LTC Rachel R. Bowers
- Garrison: USAG-O
- Occupants: 10th Regional Support Group, 1/1st Special Forces Group, 247th Military Police

US Army Garrison Okinawa is a US Army facility located in Yomitan, Okinawa Prefecture, Japan. Home to the United States Army on Okinawa, 10th Support Group (Regional), along with the 1st Battalion, 1st Special Forces Group (Airborne), 247th MP DET, and the 349th Signal Company (78th SIG BN) provide support to all other U.S. military services on the island. Formerly named 'Torii Station', the garrison was re-designated in March 2014.

== Description ==
The unit is the main United States Army garrison in the Okinawa prefecture. US Army Garrison Okinawa is responsible for receiving and distributing cargo, distributing the island's military fuel supply, and port operations. The site is located in the level area of southwestern Yomitan village. Over 400 Japanese farmers maintain fields on the base for farming crops such as sugar cane, but the space allocations for farming are shrinking.
