= Shangganling =

Shangganling may refer to:

- Sanggamnyong, or Shangganling in Chinese, a hamlet in North Korea and the site of the Battle of Triangle Hill in 1952 during the Korean War
  - Shangganling (film), 1956 Chinese war film
- Shangganling District, district of Yichun, Heilongjiang, China
