= 424th Field Artillery Battalion (United States) =

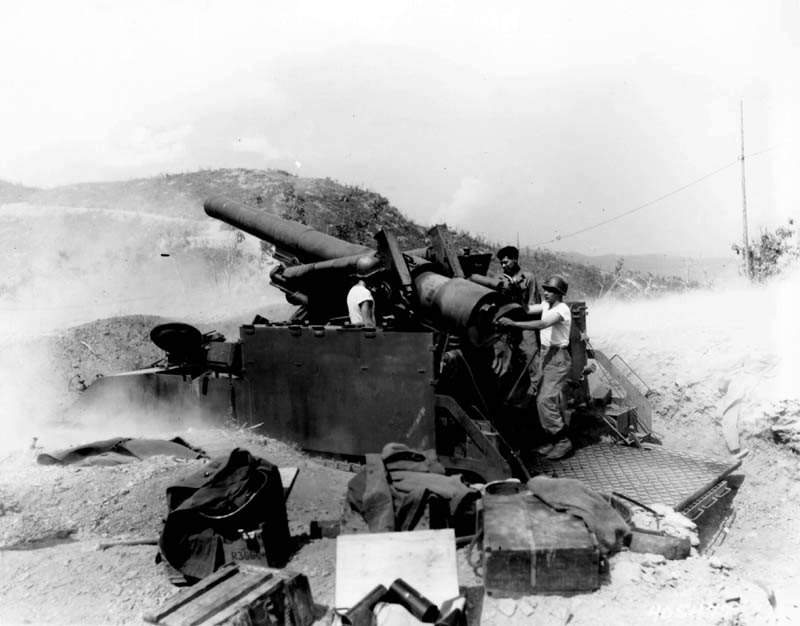
- 8 inch HMC M43 in Korea
- Active: November 14, 1946 – July 15, 1959
- Disbanded: July 15, 1959
- Country: United States
- Allegiance: Indiana
- Branch: Army
- Type: Artillery
- Size: Battalion
- Garrison/HQ: Fort Benjamin Harrison
- Mottos: "Ready" "No Point in Being Second Best"
- Colors: Red and Gold
- Equipment: M110 howitzer; M115 howitzer
- Engagements: Korean War; Pusan Perimeter Offensive; Iron Triangle (Korea); Battle of Haktang-ni; Battle of Hill Eerie; Battle of White Horse Hill; Battle of Arrowhead Hill; Battle of Triangle Hill; Battle of Chatkol; Battle of Pork Chop Hill; Battle of Outpost Harry

Commanders
- Colonel: Daniel A. Schaefer
- Major: Joseph N. Myers

The 424th Field Artillery Battalion was an Indiana artillery battalion of 8-inch M110 howitzers and M115 howitzers assigned to the IX Corps during the Korean War. The 424th was originally headquartered at Fort Benjamin Harrison in Indianapolis and was commanded by Lieutenant Colonel Daniel A. Schaefer, a veteran of the 1st Armored Division during World War II. The 424th Battalion's main engagements were in the Iron Triangle from 1951 to 1953.

== Unit history ==
The 424th Field Artillery Battalion was first activated on November 14, 1946, in Indianapolis at Fort Benjamin Harrison. When the Korean People's Army crossed the 38th parallel and invaded South Korea on June 20, 1950, the 424th Field Artillery Battalion was still part of the Indiana National Guard of the United States Army Reserve and consisted of a total of just 32 Officers and 8 Sergeants. Two days later, the unit was supplemented by personnel of the 769th Field Artillery Battalion, the 424th quickly grew to 24 officers and 101 enlisted men. On September 11, 1950, with 22 Officers and 124 Enlisted men the 424th received its unit colors from the Chief of the Indiana Military District, Colonel Harry A. Welsch.

In September 1950 the battalion was formally activated and assigned to Fort Rucker in Alabama. As the battalion was supplemented by more troops from Fort Devens and supplied with 8-inch M110 howitzers the unit was then moved to Fort Polk. Over the next twelve months the 424th saw a full transformation. The original 24 officers and 101 enlisted men had been augmented to a Table of organization and equipment of 31 officers, 8 warrant officers and 517 enlisted men. The battalion became the proud possessor of twelve 8-inch towed howitzers with M4 tractors, trucks, jeeps, tentage and mess facilities to support itself in the field.

On November 14, 1951, the advanced party of the 424th landed in Pusan, and reported to the Pusan Area Assembly Command (PAAC) where the unit took part in the Pusan Perimeter offensive. Later on November 21, 1951, the main body of the 424th arrived in Pusan on board the Japanese ferryboat the Takasago Maru. The next day the 8-inch guns and heavy equipment arrived on the ship SS Southbound Victory.

While in Korea the 424th was attached to the IX Corps. The mission of the 424th was to give support to all divisions in the IX Corps sector, but it was asked frequently to support units from I Corps and X Corps including, on occasion, the 1st Marine Division. It was frequently necessary to split artillery batteries into two platoons of two guns each in order to give support to units across the corps’ main line of resistance.

In the early spring of 1952, the original cadre of officers and men, many of whom were World War II veterans, was rotated back to the United States. The battalion fell substantially below TO&E strength, and remained well below full strength for the remainder of hostilities. Additionally, the refurbished World War II equipment was rapidly falling casualty to the Korean winter and the Korean terrain. The unit was relieved of its operational mission on September 7, 1954, and officially inactivated on July 15, 1959. During the battalion's time spent in Korea, they fired 196,184 combat rounds. Battery B fired the first combat round for the battalion. On the evening of July 27, 1953 Battery B was again awarded the honor of firing the battalion's final artillery round in Korea.

== Unit citations ==
The 424th received five major campaign stars for its service in Korea. The unit received the Presidential Unit Citation (South Korea) from the President of South Korea Syngman Rhee for critical fire missions performed in October 1952 during the Battle of White Horse Hill. Korean 4-star general Paik Sun-yup credited the 424th counter-battery fire with “breaking the back” of the Chinese attack and turning the tide of the battle.

Battery A of the 424th alone received the Presidential Unit Citation just two weeks before the Korean Armistice Agreement. On July 13, 1953, Battery A provided artillery support for UN forces under attack by six enemy divisions. During this engagement many other artillery units withdrew, but Battery A of the 424th held its ground and continued delivering fire support for nine hours despite coming under direct enemy small arms, mortar, and artillery fire after the enemy penetrated within 600 yards of their position. Their efforts contributed significantly to the containment of the enemy assault.

== Awards and decorations ==
The 424th Field Artillery Battalion's awards and decorations include:

Presidential Unit Citation (South Korea)	Presidential Unit Citation (United States)	Korean Service Medal with 5 star device
National Defense Service Medal	United Nations Service Medal Korea	Korean War Service Medal
