= Wayne C. Smith =

United States Army general

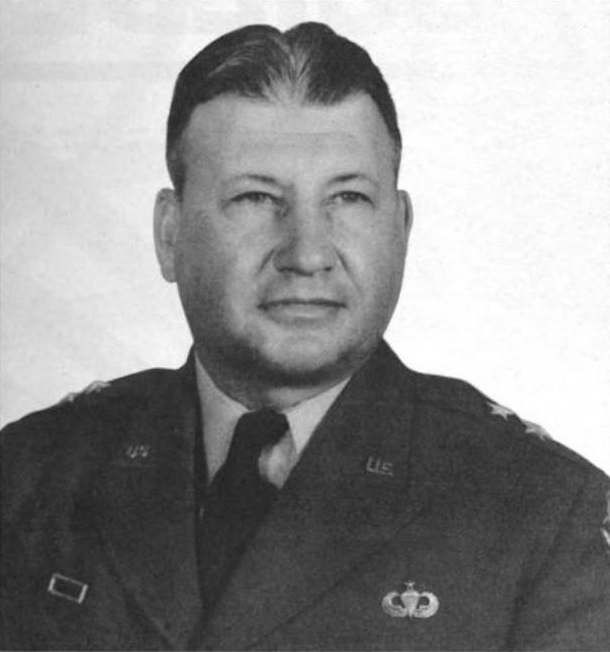
- From September 1954's Life of the Soldier and the Airman
- Born: December 4, 1901; St. Joseph, Missouri, US
- Died: November 13, 1964 (aged 62); Farmington, Maine, US
- Burial place: West Point Cemetery
- Spouse: Mildred L. Smith
- Relatives: Major Wayne C. Smith Jr. (son); Commander Robert M. Smith (son); Captain Carl R. Smith (son)
- Military career
- Allegiance: United States
- Branch: United States Army
- Service years: 1920–1921; 1925–1957
- Rank: Major General
- Service number: 0-16207
- Commands: 11th Airborne Division; 7th Infantry Division
- Conflicts: World War II; Korean War: Battle of Triangle Hill
- Awards: Distinguished Service Cross; Army Distinguished Service Medal; Legion of Merit; Soldier's Medal; Bronze Star Medal; Air Medal

Wayne Carleton Smith (December 4, 1901 – November 13, 1964) was a major general in the United States Army.

== Early life ==
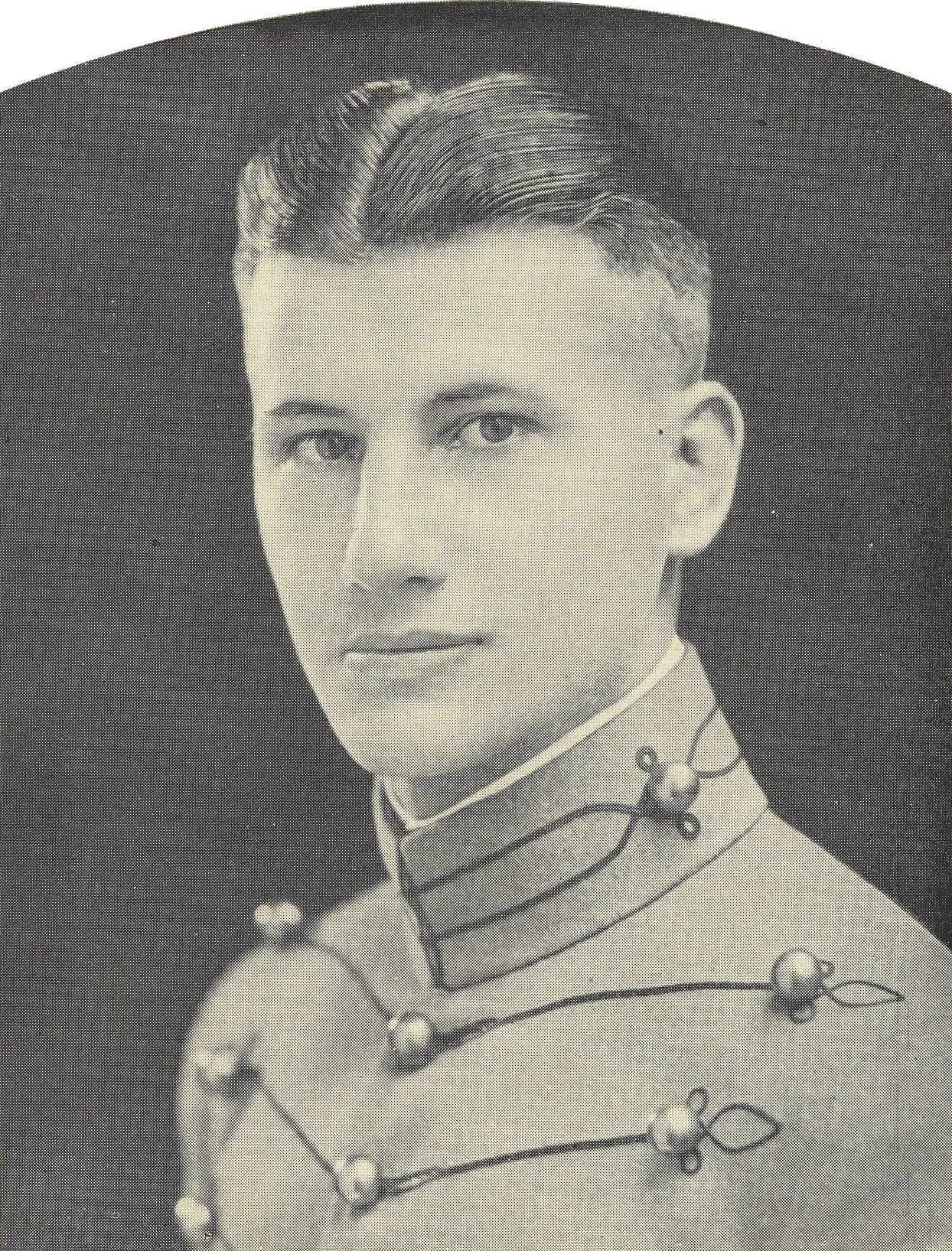
At West Point in 1925

Smith was born in St. Joseph, Missouri. He enlisted in the United States Army on January 30, 1920 and was subsequently appointed to the United States Military Academy at West Point. Smith entered the Military Academy in 1921 and graduated on June 12, 1925. His first assignment was as a platoon leader of the 15th Infantry in Tianjin, China. He later graduated from the Command and General Staff School in 1940.

== World War II ==
During World War II, Smith served in the Pacific Theater as Chief of Staff of the Central Pacific Base Command from 1943 to 1945 and was promoted to brigadier general in 1944. He received the Soldier's Medal for saving two lives in the waters off Hawaii. Smith also received the Legion of Merit and the Bronze Star Medal for his wartime service.

After the war, Smith served as an assistant commanding general of X Corps and of the 45th Infantry Division.

== Korean War ==
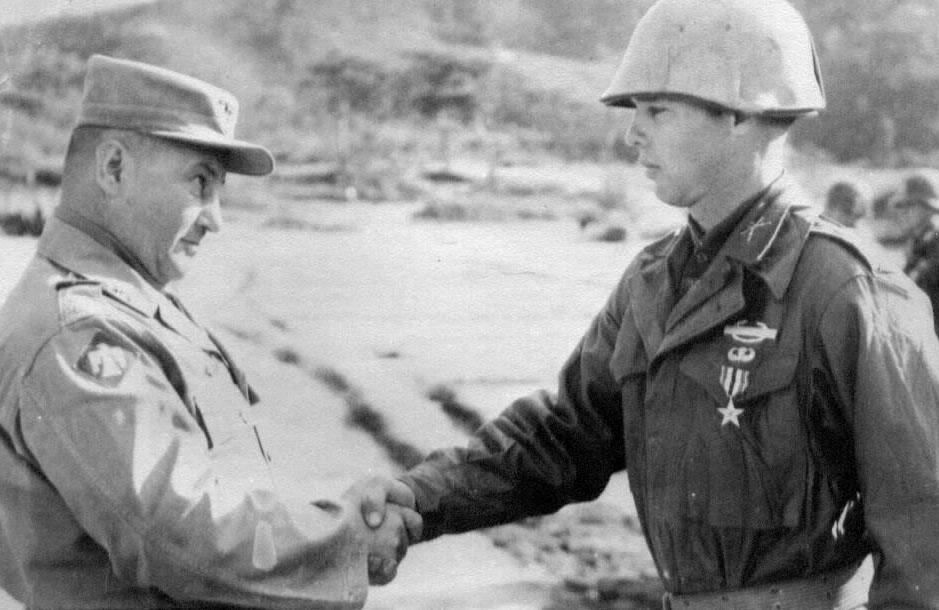
Smith presenting Silver Star to Lt. Tom Fernandez after November 1952 Battle of Triangle Hill

Smith briefly commanded the 11th Airborne Division at Fort Campbell, Kentucky from November 1951 to January 1952. He was then given command of the 7th Infantry Division, serving in combat in Korea, in July 1952. He was promoted to major general in September of the same year. He was a key commander during the Battle of Triangle Hill. He relieved of command by Major General Arthur Trudeau in March 1953. For his service with the 7th Infantry Division, Smith was awarded the Distinguished Service Cross and the Army Distinguished Service Medal. He also received the Air Medal.

== Later career ==
Following the Korean War, Smith returned as commander of the 11th Airborne Division from May 1953 to May 1955. Shortly after his return from Korea, Smith qualified as a Master Parachutist at age 52. He then served as chief of staff to the Joint United States Military Advisory Group in the Philippines from 1955 to 1957.

== Retirement and death ==
Smith retired from the army on January 31, 1957. He died in Farmington, Maine, in 1964. Smith is buried with his wife in the Post Cemetery at West Point.

== Awards ==
- Master Parachutist Badge
- Distinguished Service Cross
- Army Distinguished Service Medal
- Legion of Merit
- Soldier's Medal
- Bronze Star Medal
- Air Medal
- American Defense Service Medal
- American Campaign Medal
- European-African-Middle Eastern Campaign Medal
- Asiatic-Pacific Campaign Medal
- World War II Victory Medal
- Army of Occupation Medal
- National Defense Service Medal
- Korean Service Medal with two campaign stars
- Republic of Korea Presidential Unit Citation
- United Nations Korea Medal
- Korean War Service Medal

=== Distinguished Service Cross citation ===
GENERAL ORDERS: Headquarters, Eighth U.S. Army, Korea: General Orders No. 57 (February 25, 1955)

The President of the United States of America, under the provisions of the Act of Congress approved July 9, 1918, takes pleasure in presenting the Distinguished Service Cross to Major General Wayne Carleton Smith (ASN: 0-16207), United States Army, for extraordinary heroism in connection with military operations against an armed enemy of the United Nations while serving as Commanding General of the 7th Infantry Division. Major General Smith distinguished himself by extraordinary heroism in action against enemy aggressor forces in the vicinity of Kumhwa, Korea, during the period 14 through 17 October 1952. When the Seventh Infantry Division was committed to wrest the strongly defended Hill 598 from a numerically superior hostile force, General Smith assumed the position at an extremely vulnerable observation post in order to closely direct the attack upon the enemy, and remained at this vantage point throughout the first morning's operations despite dangerously accurate shelling of the area by Communist forces. Realizing that the assault echelons were halted short of their objective by devastating fires, heavy casualties, and adverse terrain, he immediately left the comparative safety of the observation post to personally reorganize his command for renewed attack and instill in the troops the will to win. Exposing himself to intense hostile fire, he traveled throughout the battle area, sharing the hazards and discomforts of his men, encouraging them to maximum effort, and supervising critical supply and evaluation activities. As a result of his presence in forward areas and sincere concern for the welfare of his troops, morale surged upward, enemy defenses were overrun, and highly strategic terrain was secured by the Seventh Infantry Division. Throughout the remainder of the action, he was constantly in the danger area, employing sound military tactics and forceful leadership to inspire his men to successfully repulse large-scale enemy counteroffensives, enable rapid relief of combat-weary battalions, and insure expeditious organization and consolidating of the newly-adjusted main line of resistance. Dominating and controlling the vital situation through sheer force of his heroic example, General Smith's valorous conduct and demonstrated courage under fire contributed significantly to the United Nations' first armed bid for world peace.

== Bibliography ==
- Boose, Donald (2005). US Army forces in The Korean War 1950–53. Osprey Pub. ISBN 9781841766218. OCLC 869301559.
- M., Paul (17 November 2009). Combat operations of the Korean War : ground, air, sea, special and covert. McFarland. ISBN 9780786444366. OCLC 900944143.
- Generals of World War II
