= Thomas Francis Hickey (United States Army officer) =

United States Army general

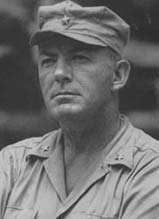
- Hickey as a brigadier general during World War II
- Born: April 1, 1898; Boston, Massachusetts
- Died: November 1, 1983 (aged 85); Arlington, Virginia
- Burial place: Arlington National Cemetery
- Military career
- Allegiance: United States
- Branch: United States Army
- Service years: 1916–1958
- Rank: Lieutenant General
- Commands: Third United States Army; IX Corps; XVIII Airborne Corps; 82nd Airborne Division; 31st Division Artillery; X Corps Artillery; 42nd Division Artillery
- Conflicts: World War I World War II; Korean War
- Awards: Army Distinguished Service Medal (2); Silver Star; Legion of Merit; Bronze Star Medal; Purple Heart
- Other work: Staff Director, Net Evaluation Subcommittee, National Security Council

Thomas Francis Hickey (April 1, 1898 – November 1, 1983) was a career officer in the United States Army. He served from 1916 to 1958 and attained the rank of lieutenant general.

== Early life ==
Hickey was born in South Boston, Massachusetts, on April 1, 1898, a son of Lawrence Hickey and Johanna T. (McGrath) Hickey. He graduated from South Boston High School in 1916. Hickey was a prominent high school athlete, and was a member of South Boston's football, basketball, and track teams. South Boston High School also participated in the Boston School Cadets program, which provided military training to the city's male high school students. Hickey served in 2nd Battalion, 5th Regiment and attained the rank of captain.

Hickey's desire for a military career was well known among friends and family, and Hickey enlisted as a private soon after his high school graduation. He was promoted to corporal in 1917 and served in the enlisted ranks until being chosen for officer training. In the summer and fall of 1917, Hickey attended officer training at the Citizens Military Training Camp at Plattsburgh Barracks, claiming an 1897 date of birth and 1915 high school graduation in order to meet the minimum age requirement. In November 1917, Hickey received a Reserve commission as a second lieutenant of Cavalry.

== Military career ==
Hickey served in France during World War I as a platoon leader in the 341st and 7th Machine Gun Battalions. He participated in the St. Mihiel and Meuse-Argonne Offensives, was wounded, and received the Wound Chevron which would be upgraded to the Purple Heart in 1932.

Hickey continued his military career after the war, remaining in Germany as a member of the Army of Occupation until February 1922. Later that year, he transferred to the Field Artillery. In 1926, he graduated from the Field Artillery Officer Course. In 1932, he was assigned to train and advise National Guard units in the I Corps area. He graduated from the Command and General Staff College in 1938 and, from 1940 to 1942, was an instructor at the Command and General Staff College.

In 1942, Hickey was assigned as Assistant Chief of Staff of the II Corps. From 1942 to 1943, Hickey served as chief of staff of the XI Corps, overseeing planning and execution of its operations in the Pacific Theater of World War II. After briefly serving as commander of the 42nd Division Artillery during its stateside training in Oklahoma, Hickey was promoted to brigadier general and assigned as commander of the X Corps Artillery, serving in the South West Pacific Theater. During the Leyte Campaign, Hickey served as commander of the 31st Division Artillery.

Following the end of the war, Hickey was assigned as chief of staff for United States Forces Austria (USFA) in 1946. Hickey was commander of the 82nd Airborne Division from 1950 to 1952, then commanded the XVIII Airborne Corps from 1952 to 1953.

Hickey commanded the IX Corps from 1953 to 1954, leading the organization during the end of its occupation of the Line Missouri Main Line of Resistance and subsequent withdrawal from combat at the end of the Korean War. In 1954, Hickey was appointed deputy commander of United States Army Forces in the Far East and promoted to lieutenant general. Hickey again commanded IX Corps from 1954 to 1955, before he was named commander of Third United States Army at Fort McPherson, where he remained until his retirement in 1958.

== Awards and decorations ==
Hickey's decorations included the Army Distinguished Service Medal with oak leaf cluster, the Silver Star, the Legion of Merit, the Bronze Star Medal, the Purple Heart, and the Air Medal.

Hickey also received an honorary doctor of laws degree from Fordham University in 1958.

== Post-military ==
Following his retirement from the army, Hickey was Staff Director for the National Security Council's Net Evaluation Subcommittee from 1958 to 1961. The Net Evaluation Subcommittee was established by President Dwight Eisenhower, and was charged assessing the Soviet Union's capacity to inflict damage on the United States and its overseas installations, as well as monitoring for changes that would alter those capabilities.

Hickey died on November 1, 1983, in Arlington, Virginia. He was buried in Section 5, Site 83, of Arlington National Cemetery.

Military offices
Preceded by Williston B. Palmer	Commanding General 82nd Airborne Division; 1950–1952	Succeeded by Charles D. W. Canham
Preceded by ??	Commanding General XVIII Airborne Corps; 1952–1953	Succeeded by ??
