= Carter B. Magruder =

United States Army general (1900–1988)

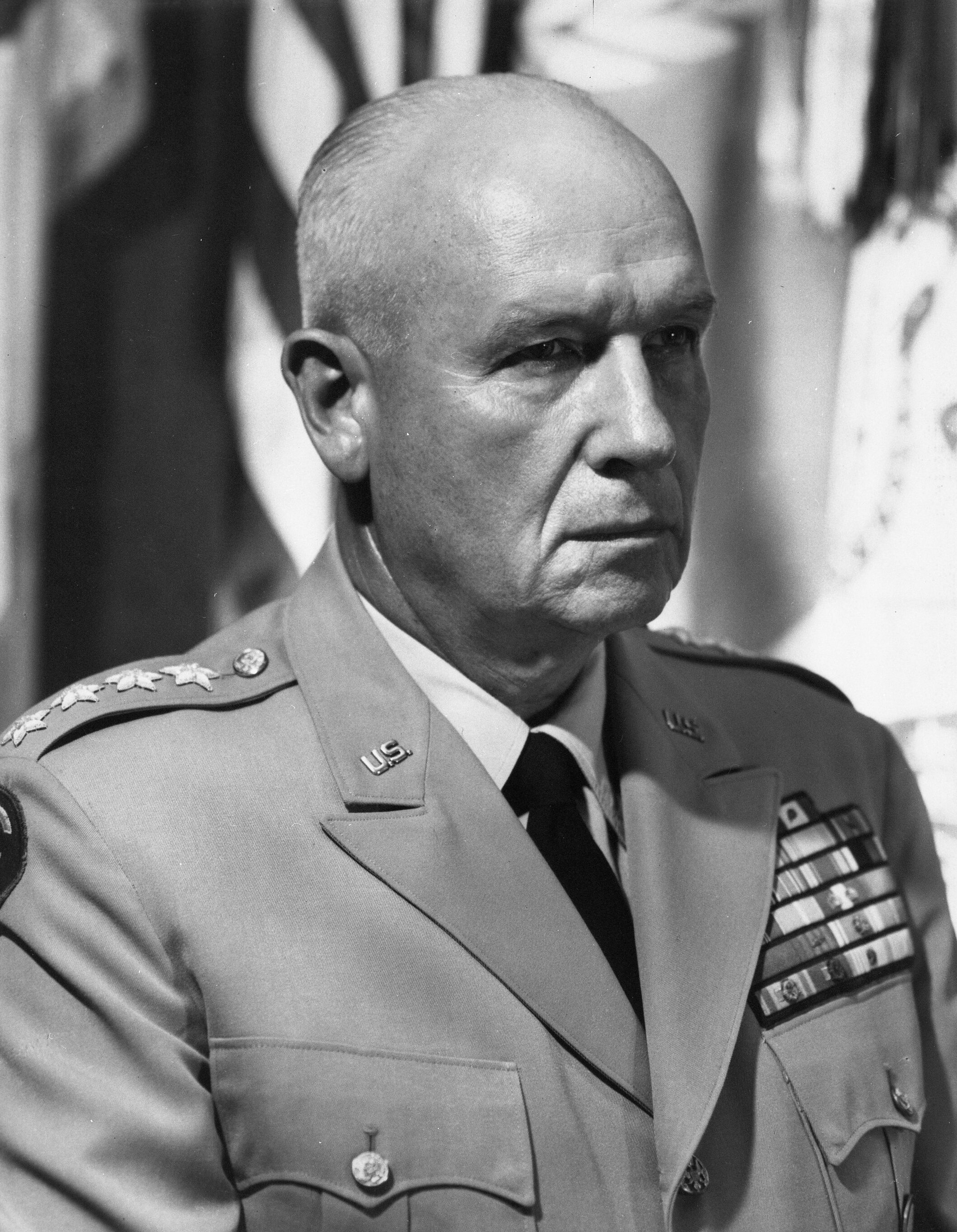
- Magruder in 1960
- Born: 3 April 1900; London, UK
- Died: 14 March 1988 (aged 87); Walter Reed Army Medical Center, Washington, D.C., U.S.
- Burial place: Arlington National Cemetery
- Military career
- Allegiance: United States of America
- Branch: United States Army
- Service years: 1918–1961
- Rank: General
- Commands: United Nations Command; U.S. Forces Korea; Eighth U.S. Army; IX Corps; 24th Infantry Division
- Conflicts: World War I World War II; Korean War
- Awards: Distinguished Service Medal (3)
- Other work: Logistics consultant

Carter Bowie Magruder (3 April 1900 – 14 March 1988) was a United States Army general who served concurrently as Commander in Chief, United Nations Command/Commander, United States Forces Korea/Commanding General, Eighth United States Army (CINCUNC/COMUSFK/CG EUSA) from 1959 to 1961.

== Early life and education ==
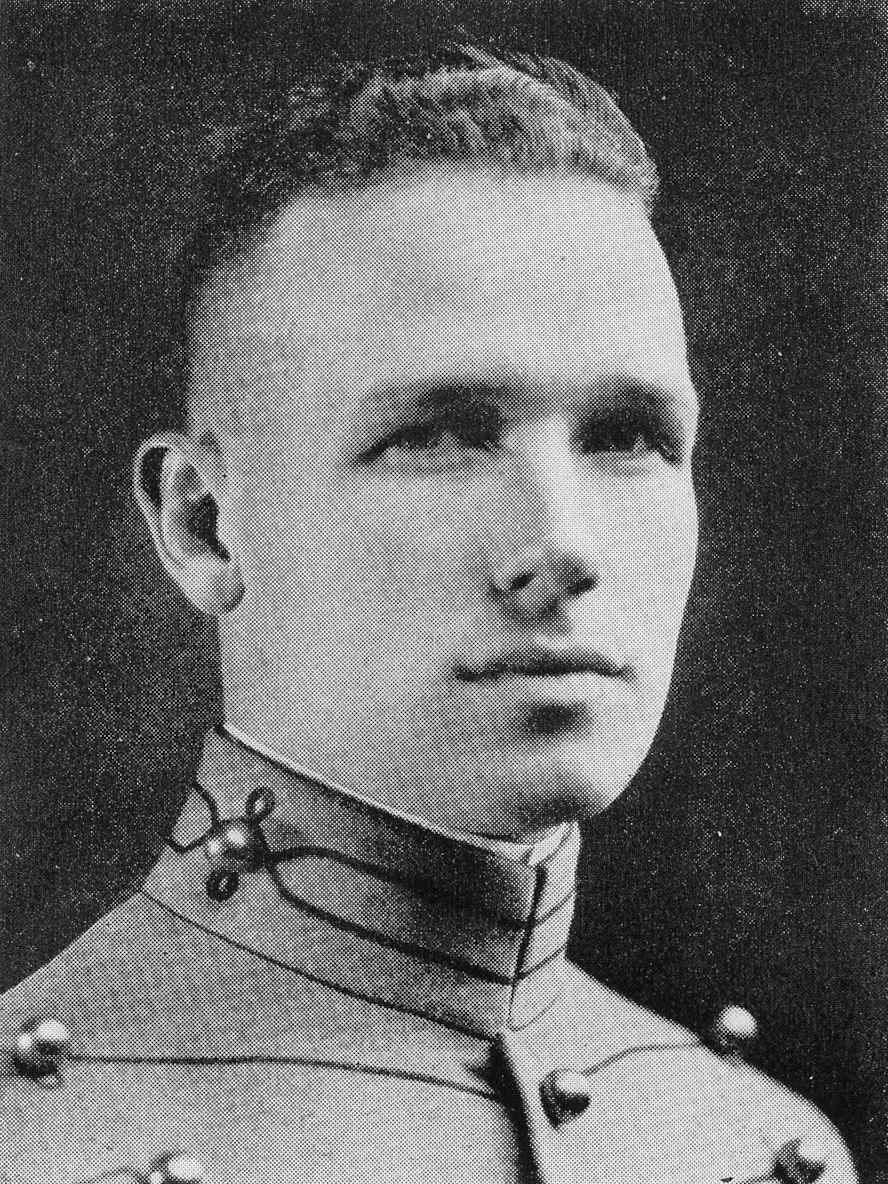
At West Point in 1923

Magruder was born in London, United Kingdom, where his father, Dr. George Mason Magruder, was serving with the United States Public Health Service. Magruder's later returned to the U.S. and settled in Albemarle, Virginia, where young Carter graduated from the high school. At the time of the U.S. entry into World War I, he was attending the University of Virginia. He dropped out of college and after period of training at the Officers Training Camp in Plattsburgh, New York, he was commissioned an infantry second lieutenant on September 16, 1918.

With the end of the war, Magruder accepted an appointment to the United States Military Academy. Upon graduation in 1923, he was commissioned in the field artillery. Later he attended Purdue University and received a master's degree in mechanical engineering in 1932. Prior to World War II, he served at various posts and assignments and also attended the Command and General Staff College and Army War College.

== World War II ==
In June 1941, Magruder was assigned to the Office of the Assistant Chief of Staff for logistics (G-4), War Department General Staff in Washington, D.C., where he served under then-Major General Brehon B. Somervell. During his service there, Magruder was promoted to lieutenant colonel on 21 December 1941. Upon the creation of Army Service Forces under General Somervell in March 1942, Magruder was appointed Director of Planning Division, Army Service Forces and was promoted to colonel on 12 December 1942. While in this capacity, he planned and supervised the logistic support from the United States for overseas operations and gained the reputation of Army's top logistician. Magruder was present at the Casablanca, Cairo, and Quebec conferences and later was decorated with Army Distinguished Service Medal for his service in this capacity.

Following the promotion to brigadier general on 13 August 1944, Magruder was ordered overseas and assumed duty as Assistant Chief of Staff for logistics (G-4) on the staff of Commanding General, Mediterranean Theater of Operations, Dwight D. Eisenhower. He was in charge of supply, transportation, and construction in that theater, stationed in Italy and was promoted to major general on 24 March 1945. Magruder later received his second Army Distinguished Service Medal for his service in the Mediterranean and also was decorated by the governments of France, Italy and Great Britain.

== Postwar service ==
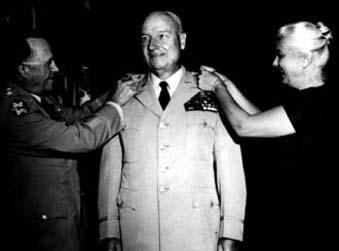
Magruder during promotion ceremony

In November 1945, Magruder was transferred to the European Theater of Operations and assumed duty as Chief of Staff, Services of Supply under Lieutenant General John C. H. Lee. He later succeeded Lee and upon the reorganization of postwar allied forces, Magruder assumed duty as Assistant Chief of Staff for logistics (G-4), United States European Command under General Joseph T. McNarney.

While in this capacity, Magruder was stationed in Frankfurt and was charged with the destruction of German equipment and fortifications, the repatriation of slave labor and displaced persons and the release of prisoners of war. He later served as Chief of Staff of the European Command under General Lucius D. Clay until March 1949, when he returned to the United States for duty at the Pentagon. Magruder served as deputy to the Assistant Secretary of the Army, Tracy Voorhees.

Magruder then served as Deputy Assistant Chief of Staff for Logistics until November 1953, when he was ordered to the Far East for duty as commanding general, 24th Infantry Division and in 1954 was promoted to lieutenant general. He then assumed command of IX Corps and returned to the United States in 1955 for duty as Assistant Chief of Staff of the Army for Logistics, the highest logistics position in the Army.

Promoted to full general in 1959, Magruder returned to Korea to command all United Nations and U.S. forces. During his command, a military junta led by Park Chung-hee overthrew the elected premier, John Chang. Magruder was publicly criticized by retired General James Van Fleet for ordering South Korean officers to stay loyal to the civilian government. Van Fleet, who supported the coup, said that Magruder "acted illegally", and:

Those ROK generals who refused to go along with the coup should have disobeyed his order ... It's all right to talk about representative government, but except in great countries like the U.S. and Great Britain, such a system lets elements get into the government and destroy it in underdeveloped countries where the enemy is lurking.

Magruder retired from the Army in June 1961 after almost 43 years of active service and received his third Army Distinguished Service Medal for his service as commanding general, United Nations Command in Korea.

== Later life and death ==
After retiring from the Army, Magruder worked as a logistics consultant to the Department of Defense and private industry. He settled in Arlington, Virginia, and was a member of the Army-Navy Country Club and the Society of the Cincinnati.

He died at the age of 87 of lung ailments on 14 March 1988, at Walter Reed Army Medical Center and was buried in Arlington National Cemetery. His wife, Luella Johnson Magruder (1907–1991) was buried with him in 1991.

== Decorations ==
Here is the ribbon bar of General Magruder:

1st Row	Army Distinguished Service Medal with two Oak Leaf Clusters	World War I Victory Medal	American Defense Service Medal	American Campaign Medal
2nd Row	European-African-Middle Eastern Campaign Medal with three 3/16 inch service stars	World War II Victory Medal	Army of Occupation Medal	National Defense Service Medal
3rd Row	Korean Service Medal	Order of the Crown of Italy, Grand Officer	Military Order of Italy, Commander	Medal of Military Valor in Bronze
4th Row	Order of the British Empire, Commander	Commander of the Legion of Honor (France)	French Croix de guerre 1939-1945 with Palm	United Nations Korea Medal
