= Kenyon A. Joyce =

United States Army general

Kenyon Ashe Joyce
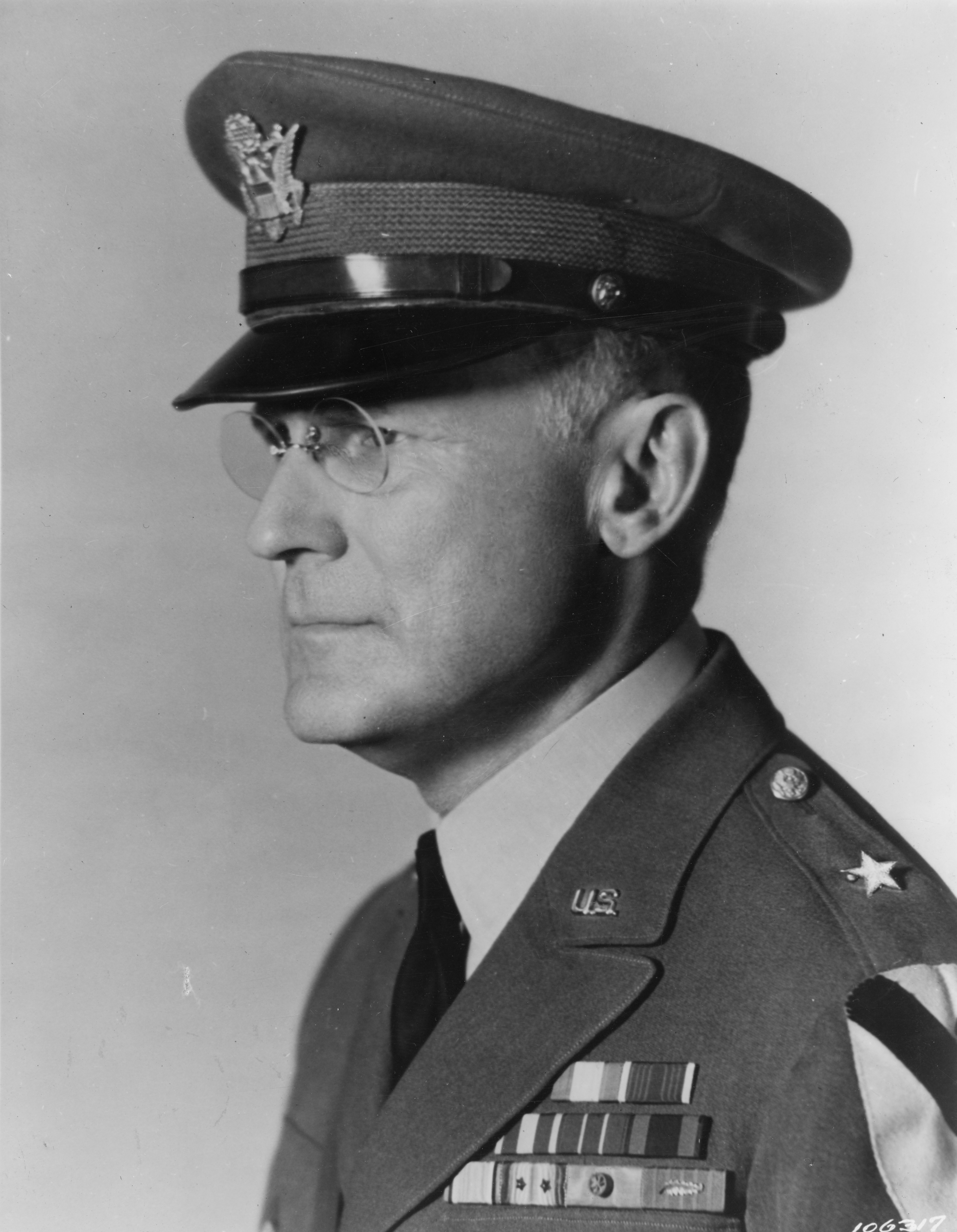
- Joyce as 1st Cavalry Brigade commander c. 1937
- Born: November 3, 1879
- Died: January 11, 1960 (aged 80); San Francisco, California
- Burial place: Arlington National Cemetery
- Spouse: Helen Jones Joyce
- Military career
- Allegiance: United States
- Branch: United States Army
- Service years: 1898–1944
- Rank: Major General
- Units: 87th Division; 31st Division; 8th Division
- Commands: 3rd Cavalry Regiment; 1st Cavalry Division; IX Corps
- Conflicts: Spanish–American War; World War I World War II
- Awards: Army Distinguished Service Medal; Purple Heart
- Other work: President, Allied Commission for Italy

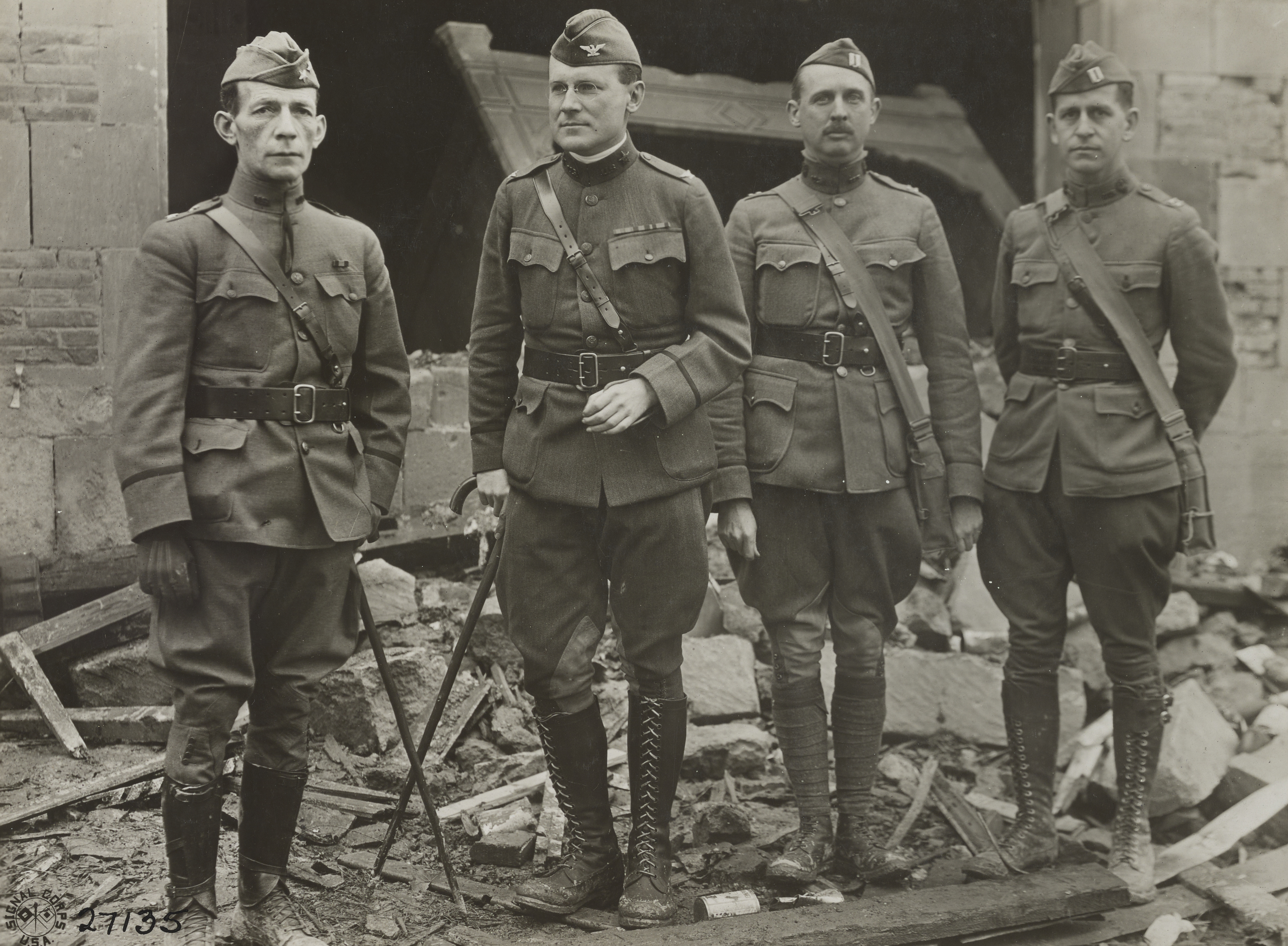
Major General LeRoy Springs Lyon (far left), commanding the 31st Division, with Colonel Joyce, his chief of staff, and two aides, France, October 1918.

Kenyon Ashe Joyce (November 3, 1879 - January 11, 1960) was a major general in the United States Army. He commanded the 1st Cavalry Division and later IX Corps in World War II.

Joyce was a prominent cavalry officer at the outset of the war and was a mentor to a young George S. Patton. He later appointed Dwight D. Eisenhower as his chief of staff and is considered to have played a strong role in his development. He had initially sought to promote Eisenhower to command of a division, but Army Chief of Staff George C. Marshall favored him for staff postings. He commanded the Ninth Service Command from July 1942 to October 1943.

Joyce reached retirement age from the U.S. Army in 1943, at which point Eisenhower, by then a prominent officer in the European Theater, appointed him to the Allied Commission for Italy.

Joyce died in January 1960, aged 80, and a funeral service was held at Fort Myer.

== Dates of rank ==
No insignia	Private, United States Volunteers: May 13, 1898
No insignia	Private, Regular Army: March 3, 1900
No pin insignia in 1901	Second lieutenant, Regular Army: February 2, 1901
	First lieutenant, Regular Army: February 18, 1908
	Captain, Regular Army: July 1, 1916
	Major, National Army: August 5, 1917
	Lieutenant colonel, National Army: June 17, 1918
	Colonel, National Army: September 14, 1918
	Captain, Regular Army: June 30, 1920 (reverted to permanent rank)
	Major, Regular Army: July 1, 1920
	Lieutenant colonel, Regular Army: March 16, 1921
	Colonel, Regular Army: July 1, 1932
	Brigadier general, Regular Army: November 1, 1936
	Major general, Regular Army: November 1, 1939
	Major general, retired list: November 30, 1943
	Major general, retired on active duty: December 1, 1943 (recalled to active duty)
	Major general, retired list: June 30, 1944

== See also ==
- List of commanders of 1st Cavalry Division (United States)

Military offices
Preceded by Ben Lear	Commanding General 1st Cavalry Division; 1938–1940	Succeeded by Robert C. Richardson Jr.
Preceded by Newly activated organization	Commanding General IX Corps; 1940–1942	Succeeded by Charles H. White
