= Lawrence Russell Dewey =

United States Army general (1901–1994)

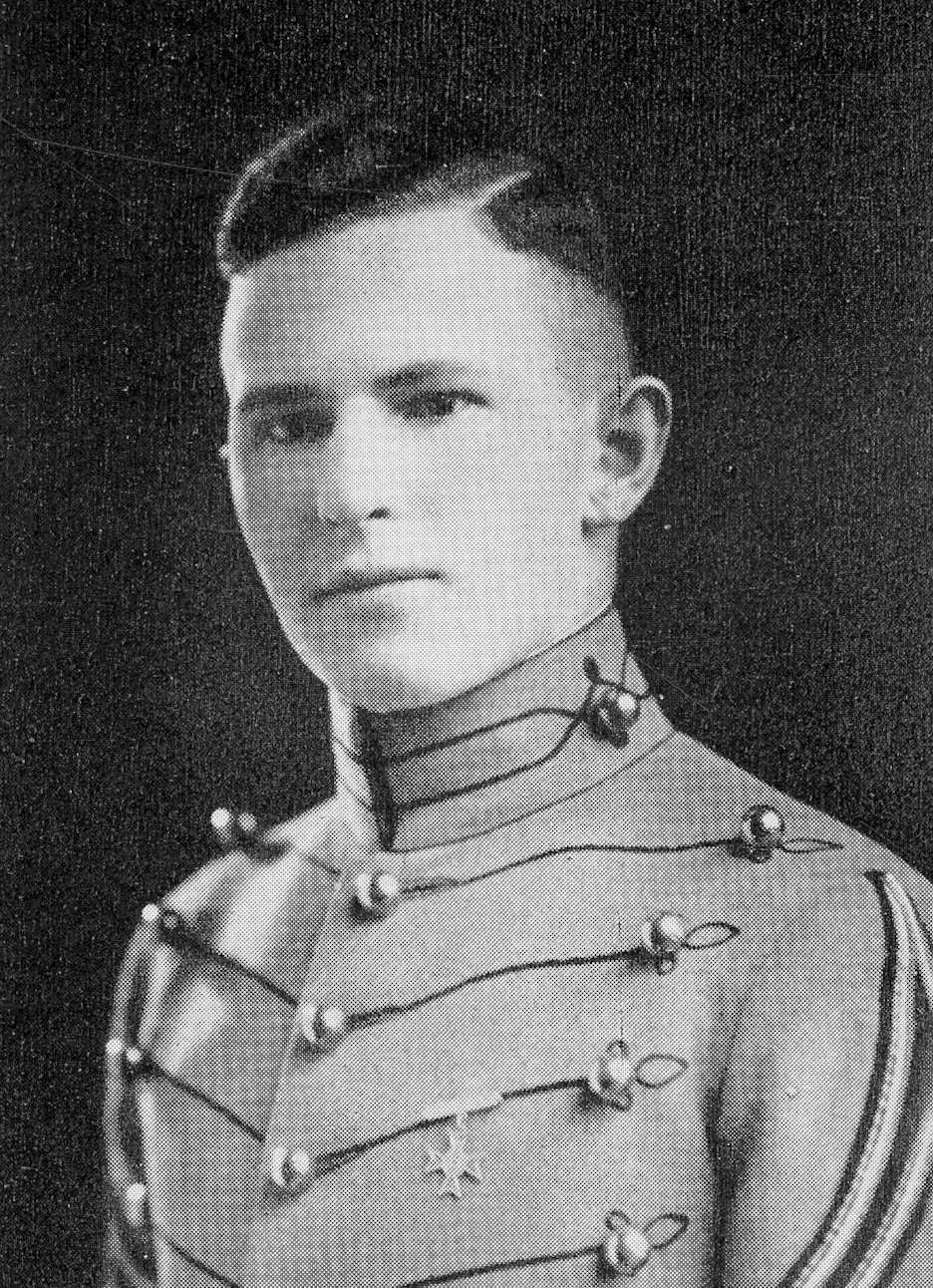
- At West Point in 1924
- Born: May 19, 1901; Des Moines, Iowa
- Died: December 18, 1994 (aged 93); Washington, D.C.
- Burial place: Arlington National Cemetery
- Military career
- Allegiance: United States
- Branch: United States Army
- Service years: 1924–1961
- Rank: Major General
- Units: 3rd Cavalry Regiment; 1st Armored Division; IX Corps
- Conflicts: World War II; Korean War
- Awards: Distinguished Service Medal (2); Silver Star (2); Legion of Merit (3); Bronze Star Medal; Purple Heart
- Other work: CIA National Board of Estimates

Lawrence Russell Dewey (May 19, 1901 – December 18, 1994) was a major general in the United States Army.

== Biography ==
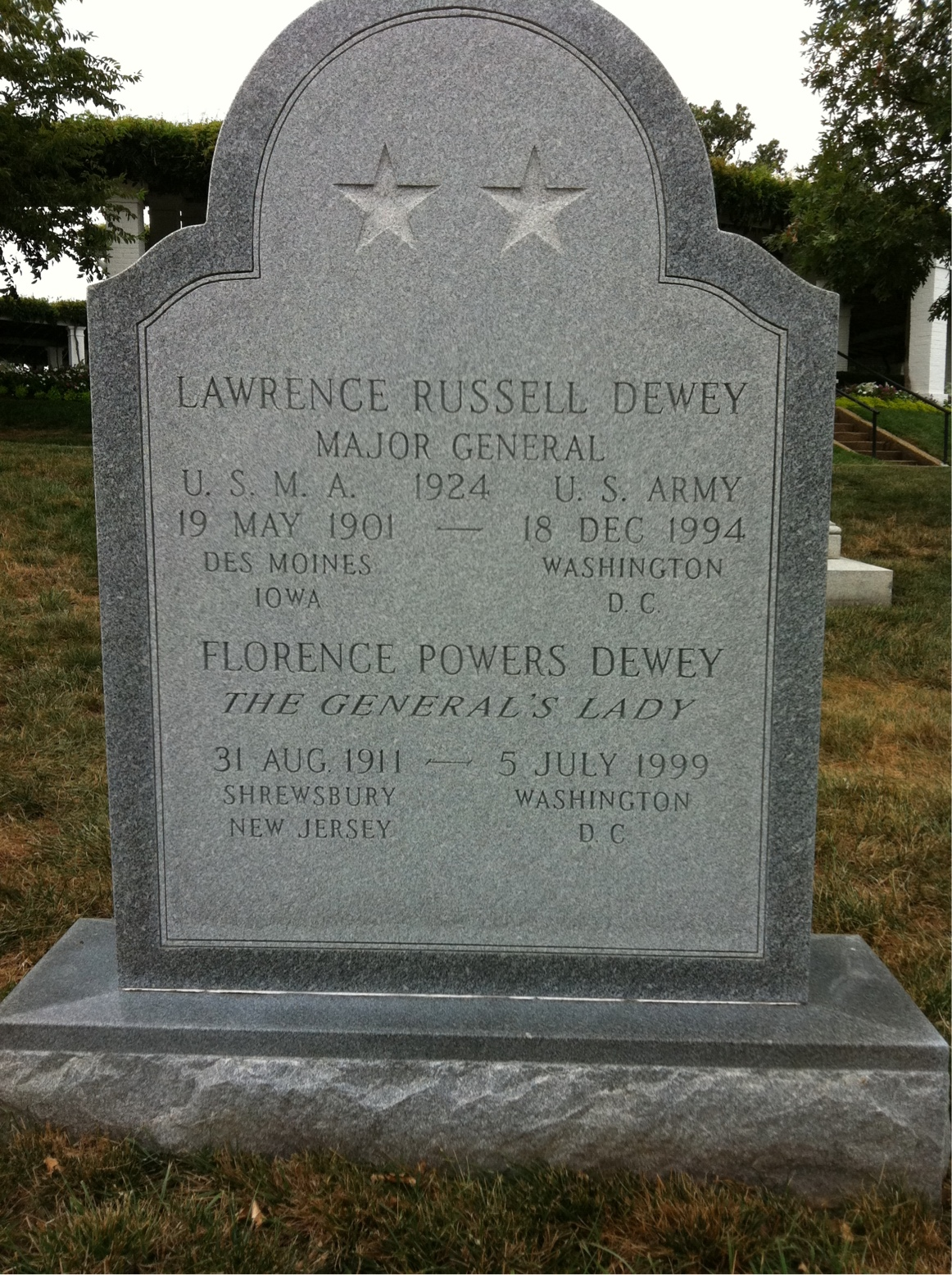
Grave at Arlington National Cemetery

Dewey was born in Des Moines, Iowa on May 19, 1901. He married Florence Powers and they had four children: Lawrence Russell Dewey Jr.; Florence "Cici" Powers Dewey (Mrs. Francis J. Hughes); Donald Herbert Dewey; Elizabeth Hazard Dewey (Mrs. Christopher L. Vance). Lawrence Jr. also became an officer in the military.

Dewey graduated from the United States Military Academy in 1924. From 1933 to 1939, he served as aide-de-camp to Brigadier General Evan Harris Humphrey. In 1939, he was assigned as a troop commander in the 3rd Cavalry Regiment.

During World War II, Dewey served in various positions with the 1st Armored Division, including Chief of Staff. After the war, he attended the National War College, graduating in June 1947. He then served on the faculty of the college from July 1947 to June 1950.

Dewey was subsequently assigned as Assistant Commander of the 1st Armored Division until 1951. Promoted to brigadier general in July 1951, he became Chief of Staff of IX Corps during the Korean War. Dewey then served in various posts until his retirement in 1961. Awards he received during his career include the Army Distinguished Service Medal, the Silver Star, the Legion of Merit, the Bronze Star Medal, and the Purple Heart.

After his retirement from the Army, he became a member of the National Board of Estimates of the Central Intelligence Agency.

He died at his home in Washington, D.C., on December 18, 1994, after suffering from Parkinson's disease. He is buried with Florence at Arlington National Cemetery.
