= Reuben Ellis Jenkins =

United States Army general (1896-1975)

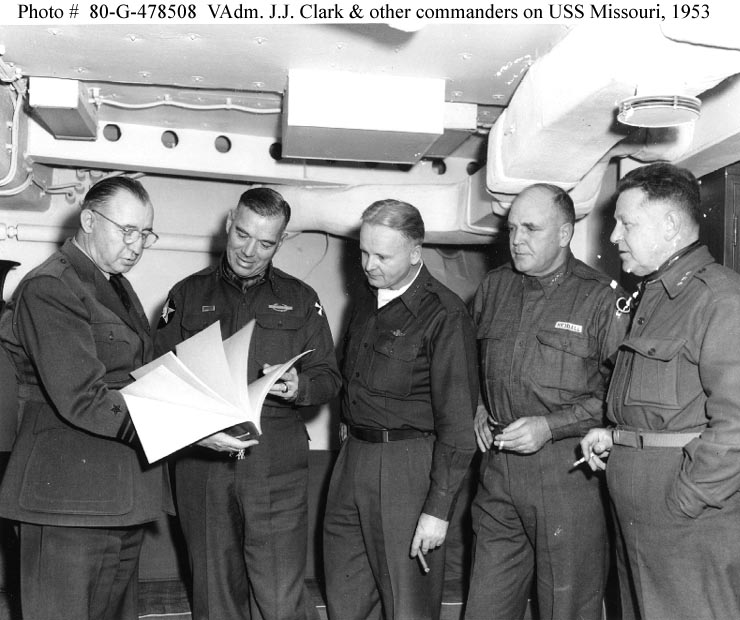
- General Ellis (far right) with other Korean War senior commanders
- Born: February 14, 1896; Cartersville, Georgia
- Died: July 29, 1975 (aged 79) Columbus, Georgia
- Allegiance: United States of America
- Branch: United States Army
- Service years: 1917–1954
- Rank: Lieutenant General
- Commands: Joint U.S. Military Advancement and Planning Group, Greece; IX Corps; X Corps
- Conflicts: World War I; World War II; Korean War
- Awards: Distinguished Service Cross; Distinguished Service Medal (3); Legion of Merit; Purple Heart

Reuben Ellis Jenkins (February 14, 1896 – July 29, 1975) was a lieutenant general in the United States Army.

== Early life ==
Jenkins was born in Cartersville, Georgia, on February 14, 1896. In April 1917, he enlisted as a private in the Georgia National Guard.

== World War I ==
In August 1918, Jenkins was commissioned as a second lieutenant. He served throughout World War I, commanding companies in the 31st, 77th and 1st Infantry Divisions.

== Post-World War I ==
Jenkins remained on active duty after World War I. In 1920, he was stationed at Camp Taylor, Kentucky. In 1922, he graduated from the Infantry Officer Course.

During the 1920s and 1930s, Jenkins served in assignments of increasing responsibility. He graduated from the Command and General Staff College in 1936. In 1937, he was assigned to Fort Moultrie, South Carolina.

Jenkins graduated from the Army War College in 1938, afterwards serving as an instructor at the Command & General Staff College.

In 1941, Jenkins was assigned to the office of the Army Deputy Chief of Staff for Personnel, G-1 in Washington, D.C.

== World War II ==
In 1943, Jenkins became Chief of the Officer Branch for the Army Services of Supply.

From 1944 to 1945, Jenkins was assigned to the 6th Army Group as a brigadier general. As Assistant Chief of Staff for Operations (G-3), he took part in planning the organization's combat operations, including its advance through Bavaria into Austria and post-war occupation duty.

== Post-World War II ==
In 1946, General Jenkins was assigned as President of the Army Ground Forces Board.

Jenkins was named assistant director of the Joint U.S. Military Advancement and Planning Group in Athens, Greece in 1948, advanced to Director, with promotion to major general, and remained in Greece until 1951. In this assignment, he took part in the successful American effort to defeat a communist insurgency by rebuilding, equipping and training the Greek Army, which had been degraded by nonstop combat during World War II.

From 1951 to 1952, General Jenkins was the Army's Assistant Chief of Staff for Operations, G-3.

== Korean War ==
Jenkins was assigned to command IX Corps in Korea, receiving promotion to lieutenant general and serving until he was wounded, after which he was evacuated to the U.S. to recuperate. In October 1952, Jenkins led a successful counterattack in the Chorwon Valley to defeat a North Korean attack, for which he received the Distinguished Service Cross. The citation for his DSC reads:

The President of the United States of America, under the provisions of the Act of Congress approved July 9, 1918, takes pleasure in presenting the Distinguished Service Cross to Lieutenant General Reuben E. Jenkins, United States Army, for extraordinary heroism in connection with military operations against an armed enemy of the United Nations while serving as Commanding General, IX Corps. Lieutenant General Jenkins distinguished himself by extraordinary heroism in action against enemy aggressor forces in the Republic of Korea on in the vicinity of Chorwon, Korea, on 9 October 1952. On that date, the Ninth Korean Army Division was attacked by a superior and fanatical enemy force intent upon destroying the division and capturing Hill 395 (White Horse Mountain), a vital terrain feature dominating the Chorwon Valley. General Jenkins, taking with him his subordinate commanders, moved to the critical area in order to personally assess the situation and direct the forces under his command. Despite the extreme dangers from intense and continuous enemy artillery and mortar fire, General Jenkins remained in the danger area and served as a constant inspiration to his subordinate commanders and soldiers throughout the first phase of the battle, during which the friendly troops fought the superior and fanatical enemy to a standstill. After the enemy attack was successfully stopped, General Jenkins remained in the battle area, prepared and launched a counterattack. Through his continued presence in the battle area throughout the day, on foot, or in a helicopter at low altitude, in calm defiance of the enemy, he was an inspiration to his entire command and by these actions was able to supervise and closely direct the counterattack which resulted in annihilation of the determined, powerful and fanatical enemy. The skillful leadership and prolonged outstanding demonstration of personal courage shown by General Jenkins under extremely hazardous conditions constituted vital elements in the successful conclusion of the battle. Name: Jenkins, Reuben E. Service: Army Rank: Lieutenant General Unit: Headquarters, Eighth U.S. Army, Korea Order: General Orders No. 801 Date: December 27, 1952

In 1953, Jenkins returned to Korea as commander of X Corps, serving until his 1954 retirement.

== Awards and decorations ==
In addition to the Distinguished Service Cross, Jenkins was a recipient of two Distinguished Service Medals, the Legion of Merit and the Purple Heart.

== Retirement and death ==
Jenkins lived in the area around Fort Benning and was active in several veterans' organizations and civic groups, including the Rotary Club.

General Jenkins died in Columbus, Georgia, from a self-inflicted gunshot on July 29, 1975.

The Reuben E. Jenkins Papers are part of the collections of the U.S. Army's Military History Institute in Carlisle, Pennsylvania.
