= Battle of Triangle Hill =

Battle of the Korean War

- Part of the Korean War
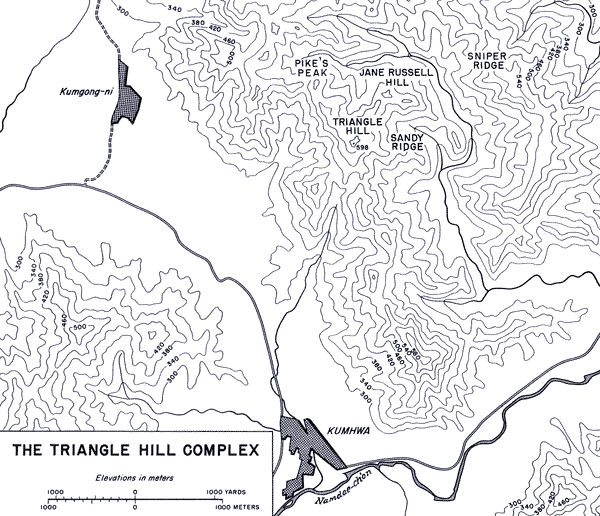
- Map of Triangle Hill area
Date	14 October – 25 November 1952
Location	North of Gimhwa-eup, Chorwon County, Korea 38°19′17″N 127°27′52″E
Result	Chinese victory on Triangle Hill; Both sides claim victory on Sniper Ridge (Note: Sniper Ridge is composed of two peaks on both the north and the south ends of the ridge. There is a discrepancy between South Korean and Chinese records on their starting locations with regards to Sniper Ridge—according to South Korean records list the southern peak as its main battle objective, with the Chinese controlling the entire ridge. According to Chinese records, the PVA occupied the northern peak (Hill 537.7) only, with UN units already controlling the southern peak at the start of the battle.)

Belligerents
United Nations: United States; South Korea; Colombia; Ethiopia	China

Commanders and leaders
Mark Wayne Clark; James Van Fleet; Reuben E. Jenkins; Wayne C. Smith; Chung Il-kwon; Asfaw Andargue; Alberto Ruiz Novoa	Deng Hua; Wang Jinshan; Qin Jiwei; Li Desheng; Cui Jiangong

Units involved
7th Infantry Division; 2nd Infantry Division; 30th Infantry Regiment; 2nd Kagnew Battalion; Colombian Battalion	15th Corps (Note: In Chinese military nomenclature, the term "Army" (军) means Corps.); 12th Corps

Strength
Infantry: Unknown; Artillery: 288 guns Aircraft: 2,200+ sorties	Infantry: 50,000; Artillery: 133 guns, 24 rocket launchers AA Artillery: 47 guns

Casualties and losses
US: 365 killed 1,174 wounded 1 captured South Korea: 1,906 killed 3,496 wounded 97 missing Chinese estimate: 25,498	Chinese source: 3,838 killed 6,691 wounded UN estimate: 19,000

The Battle of Triangle Hill, also known as Operation Showdown or the Shangganling Campaign (Chinese: 上甘岭战役; pinyin: Shànggānlǐng Zhànyì), (Note: Chinese sources often mistranslates Shangganling Campaign as the Battle of Heartbreak Ridge.) was a protracted military engagement during the Korean War. The main combatants were two United Nations (UN) infantry divisions, with additional support from the United States Air Force, against elements of the Chinese People's Volunteer Army (PVA) 15th and 12th Corps. The battle was part of UN attempts to gain control of the "Iron Triangle" and took place from 14 October to 25 November 1952.

The immediate UN objective was Triangle Hill (38°19′17″N 127°27′52″E), a forested ridge of high ground 2 kilometers (1.2 mi) north of Gimhwa-eup. The hill was occupied by the veterans of the PVA's 15th Corps. Over the course of nearly a month, substantial US and Republic of Korea Army (ROK) forces made repeated attempts to capture Triangle Hill and the adjacent Sniper Ridge. Despite clear superiority in artillery and aircraft, the escalating UN casualties resulted in the attack being halted after 42 days of fighting, with PVA forces regaining their original positions.

== Background ==
By mid-1951 the Korean War had entered a period of relative stalemate. With the resignation of Dwight D. Eisenhower as the Supreme Commander of the North Atlantic Treaty Organization (NATO) in June 1952, General Matthew Ridgway of the United Nations Command was transferred from Korea to Europe as Eisenhower's replacement. The United States Army appointed General Mark Wayne Clark, commander of the US Fifth Army during World War II, to overall command of the UN forces as a replacement for Ridgway.

General James Van Fleet, commander of the Eighth US Army, had hoped that the change of commanders would allow him to reengage the PVA in a major campaign, but in an effort to limit UN losses during the peace talks in Panmunjom, Clark repeatedly overruled Van Fleet's requests for an authorized offensive into North Korean territory. In September 1952, Van Fleet submitted tentative offensive plans for Operation Showdown, a small-scale offensive drafted by US IX Corps as a ridge-capturing operation. The goal of the submitted plans was to improve the defensive line of the US 7th Infantry Division north of Gimhwa near Triangle Hill, pushing the PVA defensive line back 1,250 yd (1,140 m).

In September 1952, the negotiations at Panmunjom began to deteriorate, primarily due to Sino-North Korean insistence that all prisoners of war be repatriated to their respective original countries, regardless of their preferences. As a significant number of Chinese and North Korean POWs had expressed their desire to defect permanently to South Korea or Taiwan, the demand was met with strong opposition from the United States and South Korea. Feeling that the negotiations would soon fail, military commanders on both sides authorized numerous tactical plans as means of applying pressure on their opponents. In late September, the PVA High Command authorized the tactical plans which led to the Battle of White Horse Hill. On 8 October 1952, truce negotiations officially ceased. Clark gave his consent to Operation Showdown the same day.

== Prelude ==
=== Locations and terrain ===
Sanggam-ryŏng, or Triangle Hill as it was named by the UN command, was a forested hill that appeared as a V shape when seen from the air or on a map. Hill 598 sat at the tip of the V and overlooked the Gimhwa valley less than 2 km (1.2 mi) to the south. From this apex, two ridges extended to the northeast and northwest. The ridge to the northwest is dominated by a hill nicknamed "Pike's Peak". The other connects to a pair of hills that had been dubbed "Jane Russell". A less-prominent ridge, named Sandy, sloped down to the east. Across the valley from Sandy stood Sniper Ridge, located at 38°19′44″N 127°29′7″E.

=== Forces and strategies ===
The original plan for Operation Showdown called for simultaneous attacks on both Triangle Hill and Sniper Ridge. One battalion from the US 31st Infantry Regiment, 7th Infantry Division would take Triangle Hill from Gimhwa-eup, while one battalion from the ROK 32nd Regiment, 2nd Infantry Division would attack Sniper Ridge along a parallel northbound route. UN planners expected the operation to last no more than five days with 200 casualties on the UN side, based on the assumption that maximum artillery and air support would be available. Before the plan could be carried out, however, the artillery and air assets for this operation were diverted to the Battle of White Horse Hill. Upon reviewing the situation, Colonel Lloyd R. Moses, commander of the US 31st Infantry Regiment, doubled the American strength just before the offensive.

On the PVA side, Triangle Hill was defended by the 8th and 9th Companies, and Sniper Ridge by the 1st Company of the 135th Regiment, 45th Division, 15th Corps. Qin Jiwei, (Note: The Chinese military did not have military ranks until 1955.) commander of the 15th Corps, predicted that any major American attack would be one of mechanized infantry and armor directed at the Pyonggang Valley 20 km (12 mi) to the west of Triangle Hill. As a result, the primary formations of the 15th Corps, including the 44th Division, the 29th Division, one armored regiment and most of the Corps artillery, were positioned near Pyonggang. In an effort to compensate its inferior firepower, the 15th Corps constructed an intricate series of defensive networks, which were composed of 9,000 meters (9,800 yd) of tunnels, 50,000 m (55,000 yd) of trenches and 5,000 m (5,500 yd) of obstacles and minefields. On 5 October 1952, a staff officer of the ROK 2nd Infantry Division defected to the PVA, bringing with him a complete battle plan of Operation Showdown, but the information was not taken seriously by the Chinese.

== Battle ==
=== Opening moves ===
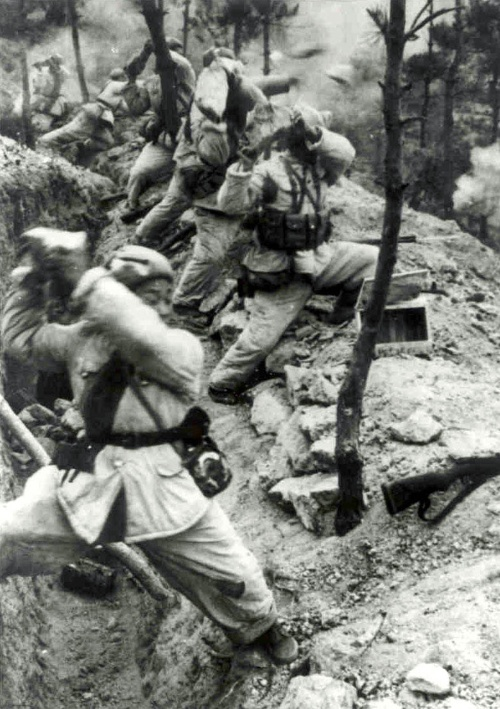
Chinese infantrymen throwing rocks at attackers after ammo depletion.

At 04:00 on 14 October 1952, following two days of preliminary air strikes, the ROK-American bombardment intensified across the 30 km (19 mi) front held by the PVA 15th Corps. At 05:00, the 280 guns and howitzers of the IX Corps extended their firing range to allow for the ROK-American infantry to advance behind a rolling barrage. The concentrated bombardment succeeded in clearing the foliage on Triangle Hill and Sniper Ridge, destroying most of the above-ground fortifications on the two positions. The intense shelling also disrupted PVA communication lines, eliminating all wired and wireless communications in the area.

As the US and ROK forces approached the PVA defenses, they were met with grenades, Bangalore torpedoes, shaped charges, and rocks. Unable to safely advance, US/ROK troops were forced to rely on close-support artillery to subdue PVA resistance, but the network of bunkers and tunnels allowed the PVA to bring up reinforcements as the above-ground troops were depleted. Although the 31st Infantry Regiment was equipped with ballistic vests in the first mass military deployment of modern personal armor; its 1st and 3rd Battalions nevertheless suffered 96 fatalities, with an additional 337 men wounded in the first attack – the heaviest casualties the 31st Infantry Regiment had suffered in a single day during the war.

The PVA managed to inflict heavy casualties on the attackers, but their defenses were starting to give way under devastating UN firepower. The defending company of Sniper Ridge was forced to withdraw into the tunnels after it was reduced to 20 survivors, and the ROK 2nd Battalion captured the ridge by 15:20. Despite the acquisition of Sniper Ridge, the attack on Triangle Hill stalled in front of the dominant Hill 598 as both US battalions suffered heavy casualties to PVA grenades. When only partial progress could be claimed by the late afternoon, US and ROK attacks subsided and preparation of defensive positions to face a PVA counterattack began.

To recover lost ground, the PVA 45th Division commander Cui Jiangong attempted a sneak attack with three infantry companies at 19:00. When flares broke the night cover, the attackers launched bayonet charges and hand-to-hand fighting ensued. The UN forces responded with heavy artillery fire, but the determined PVA assault troops marched through both PVA and UN artillery screens to reach the UN positions – a strange sight that made some American observers believe that the attackers were under the influence of drugs but no evidence found. The intense fighting prevented UN forces from receiving any resupply, and the UN defenders were forced to give up all captured ground after running out of ammunition.

=== Taking the surface ===
Both Major General Wayne C. Smith and Lieutenant General Chung Il-kwon, commanders of the US 7th Infantry Division and the ROK 2nd Infantry Division respectively, relieved exhausted battalions daily to maintain troops' morale. On 15 October Smith ordered the 1st Battalion, 32nd Infantry Regiment and the 2nd Battalion, 31st Infantry Regiment to be placed under the command of Colonel Moses to resume the attack on Triangle Hill. Similarly, Chung Il-kwon replaced the 2nd Battalion, 32nd Regiment with the 2nd Battalion, 17th Regiment. Later that day both US battalions captured Hill 598 and Sandy Ridge after meeting only light resistance, but the PVA tunnels and a counterattack by the PVA 135th Regiment prevented the Americans from advancing towards Pike's Peak and Jane Russell Hill. The ROK, on the other hand, were thrown back by a PVA counterattack after recapturing Sniper Ridge.

On 16 October Colonel Joseph R. Russ of the 32nd Infantry Regiment took over the operational command from Moses. He was also given the 2nd Battalion, 17th Infantry Regiment to reinforce his right wing. After arriving on the battlefield, the 2nd Battalion, 17th Infantry managed to wrestle Jane Russell Hill away from the PVA on 16 October, but the Americans soon came under heavy fire from PVA machine guns in the valley below, and were forced to withdraw to the slope behind the hill on 18 October. The PVA continued to harass the US positions with small raiding parties and grenade barrages throughout that night. The ROK fared somewhat better, as a joint attack by 2nd Battalion, 17th Regiment and the 2nd Battalion, 32nd Regiment captured Sniper Ridge and held it against subsequent PVA counterattacks. For the first time since the combat began, UN forces had gained firm control of the surface, with the exception of Pike's Peak. On the afternoon of 17 October the 3rd Battalion, 17th Infantry Regiment relieved the 2nd Battalion, 31st Infantry Regiment on the left wing, while the 1st Battalion, 32nd Infantry Regiment was withdrawn from the pacified center.

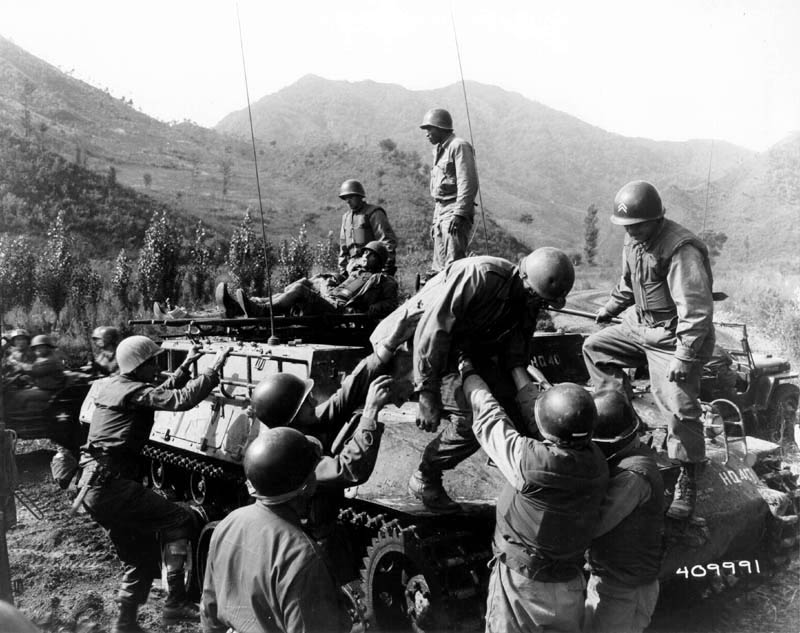
Medical corpsmen assist wounded infantrymen of the 31st Infantry Regiment, following the fight for Hill 598.

For Qin Jiwei, the lack of functioning communication networks and accurate intelligence prevented him from responding to the UN assaults. Because of his indecision, the 45th Division also received no artillery support against the UN attacks. In the face of devastating UN firepower, the PVA defenders suffered 500 casualties per day during the initial UN onslaught. On 17 October after learning that more than 10 PVA infantry companies were rendered combat ineffective, Cui Jiangong committed the remaining six infantry companies to a last-ditch counterattack. Aided by 44 large-caliber guns and a regiment of BM-13 rocket launchers, the elite 8th Company of the 134th Regiment attacked from the tunnels under Hill 598 while the other five infantry companies attacked across open ground at dusk on 19 October. Their left wing drove the ROK off Sniper Ridge, but the US defenders on Triangle Hill held firm. At daybreak on 20 October UN firepower regained the upper hand and the PVA were forced back into the tunnels after suffering heavy casualties. By the time Smith replaced the US 17th Infantry Regiment with the 32nd Infantry Regiment on the afternoon of 20 October, Qin Jiwei received reports that the 45th Division was completely decimated. The PVA attacked Hill 598 again on the night of 23 October with two infantry companies, but the well-entrenched US troops beat back the attack with little difficulty.

After suffering over 4,000 casualties in ten days, the failure of the last attack ended the 45th Division's role as the only combatant on the PVA side. The UN forces had gained strong control over most of the area, with the remaining PVA defenders trapped in tunnels under the UN positions. Despite the initial setbacks, Deng Hua, acting commander of the PVA, considered the situation a golden opportunity to bleed the US military white. In the strategy meeting held on the evening of 25 October, the 15th Corps was ordered to retake the two hills regardless of the cost.

=== Interlude ===
Van Fleet decided to rest the US 7th Infantry Division on 25 October, thus sidestepping the PVA intention of inflicting additional casualties on the Americans. The ROK 31st Regiment, 2nd Infantry Division would take over the Triangle Hill area while the ROK 17th Regiment, 2nd Infantry Division maintained control of Sniper Ridge. On the same day, fresh PVA reinforcements were converging on the Kimhwa front. The PVA High Command ordered the 12th Corps to be placed under the command of the 15th Corps and Qin Jiwei ordered the 86th and 87th Regiments of the 29th Division to link up with the 45th Division for a new counterattack. The 45th Division also received 1,200 new recruits to reconstitute 13 of its infantry companies. About 67 heavy guns and one regiment of anti-aircraft artillery were made available to support the upcoming counterattack. All PVA reinforcements were focused on Triangle Hill, with Sniper Ridge considered secondary.

Over the next five days, the ROK 31st Regiment was involved in a bitter struggle with the PVA defenders underground. The PVA 45th Division had also infiltrated small units into UN positions every night to resupply the trapped units and to evacuate the wounded, causing heavy casualties among the PVA logistics and medical units. As there was no battalion level combat between 20 and 29 October, the PVA were able to gather their strength for a decisive blow.

=== Escalation ===
Before the start of the battle, Qin Jiwei had worried that Van Fleet would try to lure the PVA forces around Triangle Hill, with the real blow directed towards the Pyonggang Valley. To counter this possibility, the 44th Division and the 85th Regiment, 29th Division had been conducting preemptive attacks on Jackson Heights since early October. From mid-October, the 44th Division increased the strength of its attacks in an effort to relieve pressure from Triangle Hill, and the battle of attrition that was witnessed over Triangle Hill had also developed at Jackson Heights.

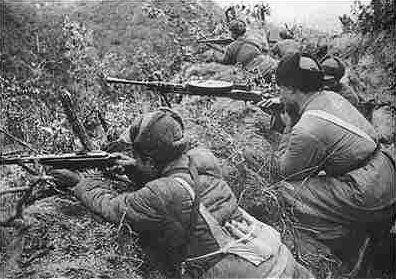
A squad of Chinese infantrymen in defensive position on Triangle Hill. The machine-gunner is armed with a Degtyaryov.

At noon on 30 October, the 15th Corps bombarded the ROK with 133 large-caliber guns, 22 rocket launchers and 30 120 mm heavy mortars in the largest Chinese artillery operation of the war. When the bombardment ended at midnight, 10 infantry companies from the 45th and the 29th Divisions swarmed over the ROK 31st Regiment's positions and pushed the ROK off the summit. In the aftermath of the fighting, only 175 ROK soldiers survived the onslaught out of the three defending infantry companies. With the PVA 91st Regiment, 31st Division, 12th Corps, arriving as reinforcement on 1 November, the PVA forces chased the remaining ROK defenders off Jane Russell Hill and beat off the subsequent counterattack. (Note: Chinese records diverge greatly from 30 October to 5 November, claiming that in addition to the ROK 30th Infantry Regiment, the US 187th Regimental Combat Team was also present during this phase of the battle.) Responding to the losses, US IX Corps ordered the ROK 30th Infantry Regiment, 9th Infantry Division to take back Triangle Hill on 31 October. The ROK launched continuous attacks for the next five days to no avail. Although the ROK failed to recapture the hill, the resulting heavy casualties forced the PVA to call in the 93rd Regiment, 31st Division as reinforcement on 5 November. On the same day, Lieutenant General Reuben E. Jenkins, commander of US IX Corps, suspended further attacks on Triangle Hill to prevent more casualties and to protect Sniper Ridge. (Note: Although Chinese historiography generally claimed that the US Army's decision to announce Van Fleet's retirement on 9 November was influenced by Operation Showdown, the biographer Paul F. Braim pointed out that Van Fleet had already started the discussion of his retirement on 27 September because of his mandatory retirement date on 31 January 1953. Nevertheless, until Christmas 1952, the United States Secretary of the Army had not formally declared that Van Fleet's retirement date was to be set on 31 March 1953. See Zhang 2010, p. 296 and Braim 2001, pp. 288–289, 311–314.)

As IX Corps gave up on Triangle Hill, the PVA 31st Division, 12th Corps was in position to take back Sniper Ridge. Under the cover of inclement weather, an assault was launched by the 92nd Regiment at 16:00 on 11 November. The PVA soon drove off the defending ROK 1st Battalion, 32nd Regiment, but Chung Il-kwon replied with a counterattack by the ROK 17th Regiment, 2nd Infantry Division at dawn on 12 November. After two hours of fighting, the 1st Battalion, 17th Regiment recaptured two-thirds of Sniper Ridge and inflicted heavy casualties on the PVA 92nd Regiment. The 31st Division relieved the 92nd Regiment with its 93rd Regiment to launch another assault on 14 November, but the ROK 17th Regiment responded by committing all units to blunt the attack. By 17 November, with the help of the ROK 1st Field Artillery Group, the ROK 2nd Battalion returned to the 1st Battalion's original position after a two-hour battle. Undeterred by heavy casualties, the PVA 106th Regiment, 34th Division, 12th Corps relieved the weakened 93rd Regiment during the night of 18 November. For the next six days, 'seesaw' fighting continued on Sniper Ridge. By 25 November the ROK 2nd Infantry Division was relieved by the ROK 9th Infantry Division on Sniper Ridge and the fighting finally died down.

=== Conclusion ===
The high numbers of UN casualties and pressure from Clark made Van Fleet break off Operation Showdown on 28 November and thus end the Battle of Triangle Hill. A few days later, the PVA 34th Division and the ROK 9th Infantry Division were engaged in a seesaw battle on Sniper Ridge on 2–3 December, but it failed to produce any territorial gains for either side. On 15 December, with the PVA 29th Division taking over the control of the battlefield from the 34th Division, the 12th Corps withdrew from the area and the 15th Corps settled back to the status quo prior to 14 October.

== Aftermath ==
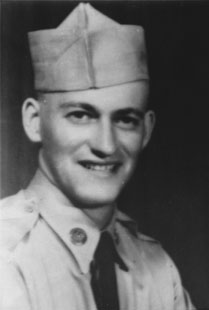
Private First Class Ralph E. Pomeroy was posthumously awarded the Medal of Honor for his actions during the battle.

The Battle of Triangle Hill was the biggest and bloodiest contest of 1952. After 42 days of heavy fighting, the Eighth Army had failed to gain two hill masses, its original goal. For the PVA, on the other hand, not only did the 15th Corps stop the UN attacks at Triangle Hill, the assaults conducted by the 44th Division on the Pyonggang front also resulted in Jackson Heights' capture on 30 November. Although the PVA had suffered 11,500 casualties with many units suffering very many losses during the battle, its ability to sustain such losses had slowly exhausted the US Eighth Army over two months of attrition. The PVA High Command viewed the victory as vindication that attrition was an effective strategy against the UN forces, while the PVA became more aggressive in the armistice negotiations and on the battlefield. The high UN casualties forced Clark to suspend any upcoming offensive operations involving more than one battalion, preventing any big UN offensives for the rest of the war. Clark and US President Harry S. Truman later confided that the battle was a serious blow to UN morale. As for the ROK, the modest UN gain on Sniper Ridge had convinced them that they were now capable of conducting independent offensive operations, even though the American advisers were less than impressed with their performance during the course of the battle.

Despite its impact and scale, the Battle of Triangle Hill is one of the least known episodes of the Korean War within the Western media. For the Chinese, the costly victory presented an opportunity to promote the value of endurance and sacrifice. The courage demonstrated by the PVA soldiers at Triangle Hill was repeatedly glorified in various forms of media, including several major motion pictures. Qin Jiwei was also celebrated as the hero of Shangganling and eventually rose to become the Minister of National Defense and the Vice Chairman of the National People's Congress. The 15th Corps became one of the most prestigious units within the PLA, and the PLAAF selected the 15th Corps to become China's first airborne corps in 1961. It remains the most elite corps-size unit in China today.

== See also ==
- 1952 United States presidential election
- Huang Jiguang
