= Sanggamryong =

Mountain pass in North Korea

Coordinates: 38°20′0″N 127°28′0″E

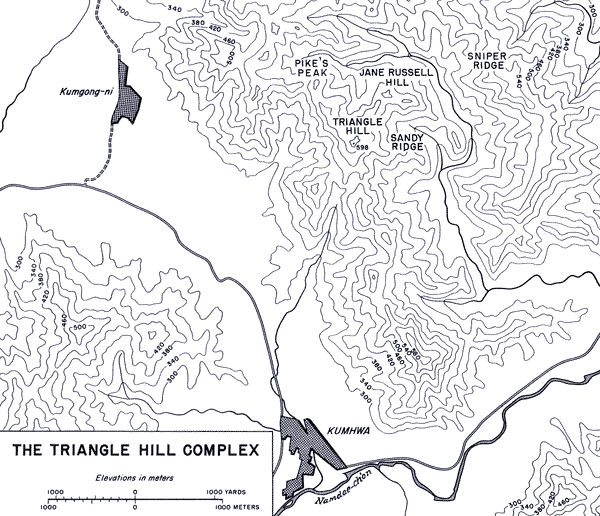
- Map of the Triangle Hill Complex, Sanggamryŏng is located at the Y junction behind Jane Russell Hill

Korean name
- Chosŏn'gŭl: 상감령
- Hancha: 上甘嶺
- Revised Romanization: Sanggamryeong
- McCune–Reischauer: Sanggamryŏng

- Triangle Hill
- Hangul: 삼각고지
- Hanja: 三角高地
- Revised Romanization: Samgakgoji
- McCune–Reischauer: Samgakkoji

Sanggamryŏng, also known as Shangganling (Chinese: 上甘岭; pinyin: Shànggānlǐng) in Chinese, Triangle Hill (Korean: 삼각고지) in South Korea, and Jane Russell Hill in United States is a mountain pass in central North Korea.

The mountain pass is part of the Triangle Hill Complex, which is roughly 4 km north by northeast of Kimhwa. Situated in the valley between the Jane Russell Hill and the Sniper Ridge, the hamlet became famous in China because of the Battle of Shangganling, a large-scale battle in the Korean War. When the fighting broke out, the hamlet had already been leveled by bombings, with most of its residents displaced, and so it played no role in the battle itself.

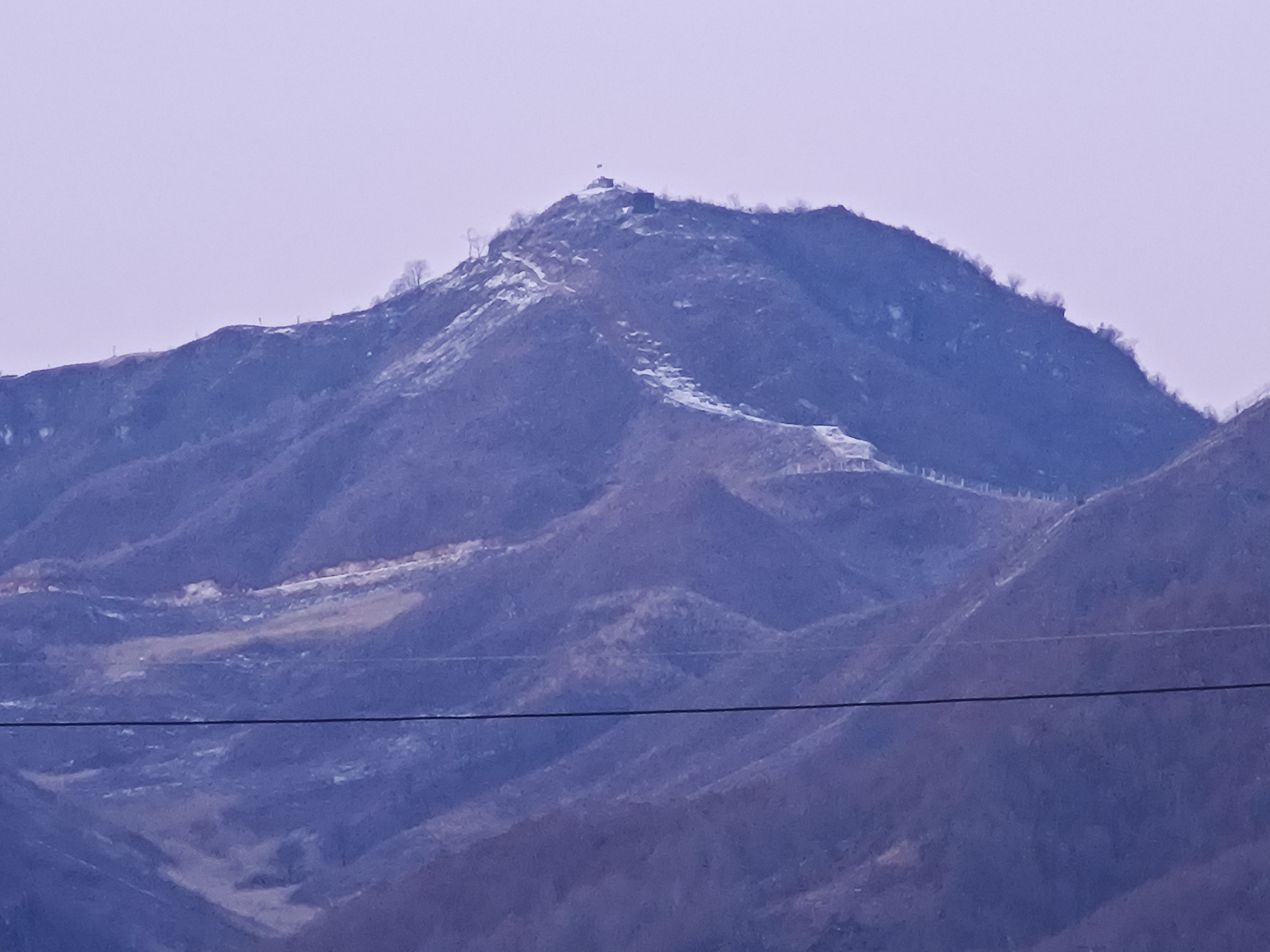
Triangle Hill view from South Korea
