= 322nd Civil Affairs Brigade =

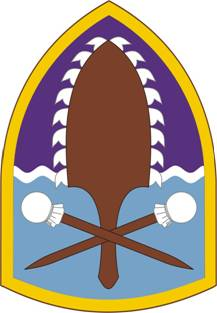
- Active: 1949-present
- Country: United States
- Branch: United States Army Reserve
- Role: Civil Affairs
- Size: Brigade
- Part of: 9th Mission Support Command
- Garrison/HQ: Fort Shafter, Hawaii
- Motto: No Ka Pono O Ka Lāhui (For the Benefit of the People)
- Website: https://www.facebook.com/profile.php?id=61558790847416

Commanders
- Current commander: COL Phillip Smith

Insignia
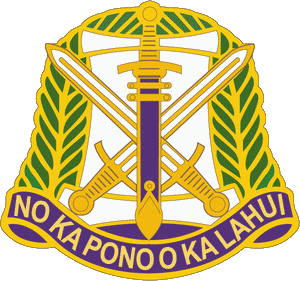
- 322nd Civil Affairs Brigade DUI

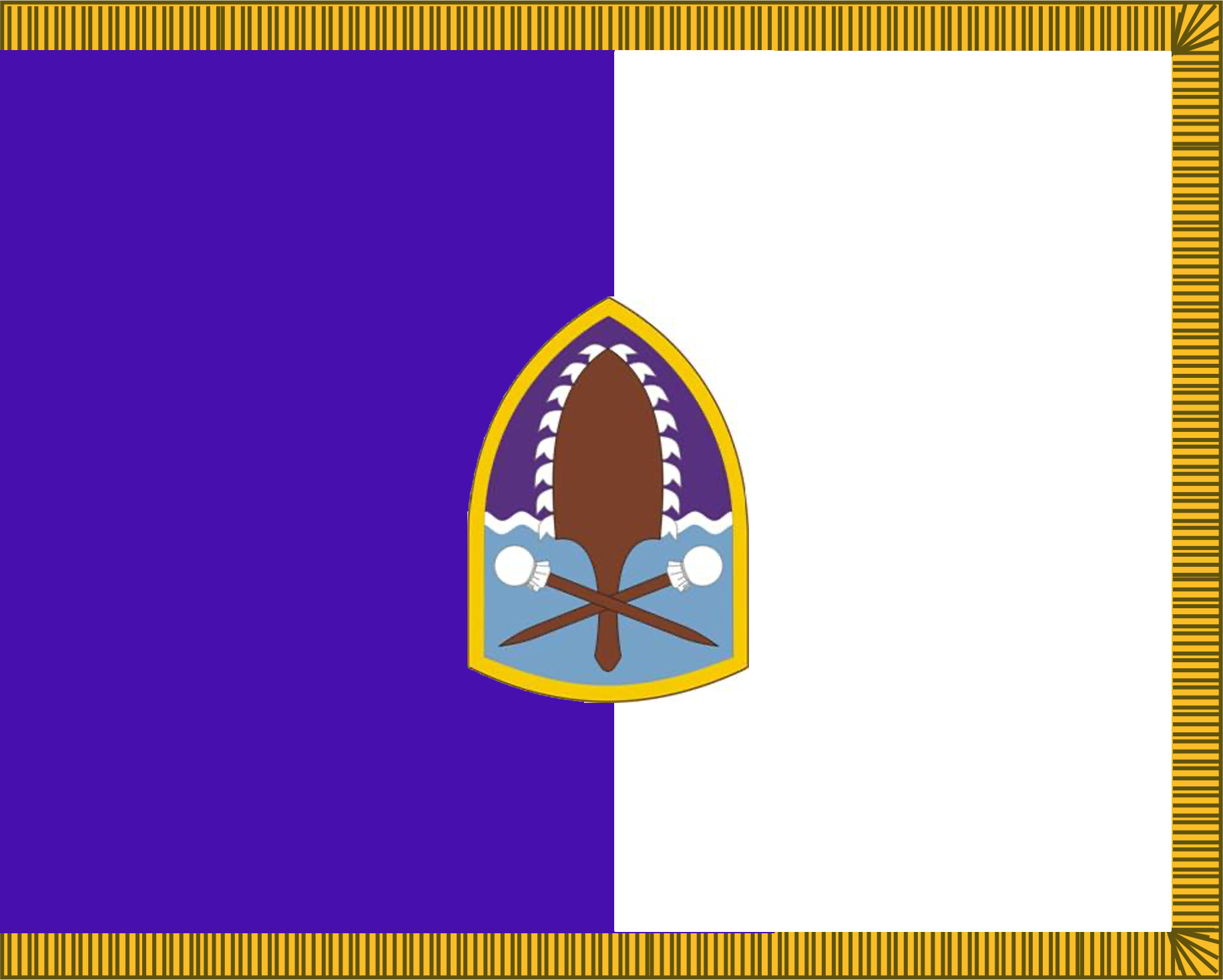
- 322nd Civil Affairs Brigade Flag

The 322nd Civil Affairs Brigade is a unit of the US Army Reserve stationed at Fort Shafter, Hawaii since 1994. The unit began service as the HHD, 102nd Military Government Group at the Presidio of Monterey, California. The unit was inactive from 1949 to 1955 when it was redesignated as 322nd Military Government Group and assigned to the reserves at Fort DeRussy, Hawaii. In 1959 it was reorganized as the 332nd Civil Affairs Group and assigned to US Army Hawaii. In 1974 it was reassigned to US Army Pacific. It would go through several more reassignments as far as its command structure, but in 1987 it would be assigned to IX Corps. Finally in 1992 it would become a brigade and relocated to its current garrison in 1994. It is currently assigned to the 9th Mission Support Command (successor to IX Corps).

== Organization ==
As of December 2025 the brigade consists of the following units:

- 322nd Civil Affairs Brigade, at Fort Shafter (HI)
  - Headquarters and Headquarters Company, at Fort Shafter (HI)
  - 100th Battalion / 442nd Infantry Regiment, at Fort Shafter (HI)
    - Headquarters and Headquarters Company, at Fort Shafter (HI)
      - Detachment 1, Headquarters and Headquarters Company, in Hilo (HI)
    - Bravo Company, 100th Infantry Battalion, in Tafuna (American Samoa)
    - Charlie Company, 100th Infantry Battalion, at Joint Base Lewis–McChord (WA)
    - Delta Company, 100th Infantry Battalion, at Fort Shafter (HI)
    - Echo Company, 100th Infantry Battalion, in Barrigada (Guam)
      - Detachment 1, Echo Company, 100th Infantry Battalion, in Tanapag (Saipan)
    - 740th Forward Support Company, at Fort Shafter (HI)
