= 303rd Brigade =

303rd Brigade may refer to:

- 303rd Brigade, Royal Field Artillery, United Kingdom
- 303rd Infantry Brigade, United Kingdom
- 303rd Maneuver Enhancement Brigade, United States

== See also ==
- 303rd Regiment (disambiguation)
