= United States Army Pacific =

Army service component command of the United States Army

- USARPAC shoulder sleeve insignia
- Active: 1947–1974; 1994–present
- Country: United States of America
- Branch: United States Army
- Type: Army Service Component Command/Theater Army
- Role: Command (military formation)
- Size: 107,000
- Part of: United States ArmyU.S. Department of the Army; U.S. Pacific Command
- Garrison/HQ: Fort Shafter, Hawaii
- Motto: One Team
- Colors: White and red
- Decorations: Presidential Unit Citation x 2 Superior Unit Award; Philippine Republic Presidential Unit Citation
- Campaigns: World War II: Philippine Islands; New Guinea; Leyte; Luzon
- Website: Official website link

Commanders
- Commanding General: (United States) GEN Ronald P. Clark
- Deputy Commanding General: (United States) LTG Joel B. Vowell
- Deputy Commanding General, Strategy and Plans (AUS): (Australia) MAJGEN Giles Cornelia
- Deputy Commanding General, Homeland Affairs: (United States) MG Lance A. Okamura
- Chief of Staff: (United States) BG Thomas E. Burke
- Command Sergeant Major: (United States) CSM Jason P. Schmidt

Insignia
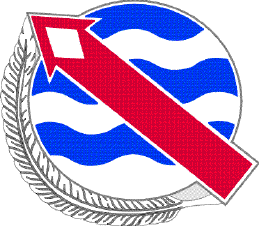
- Distinctive insignia
- Abbreviation: USARPAC
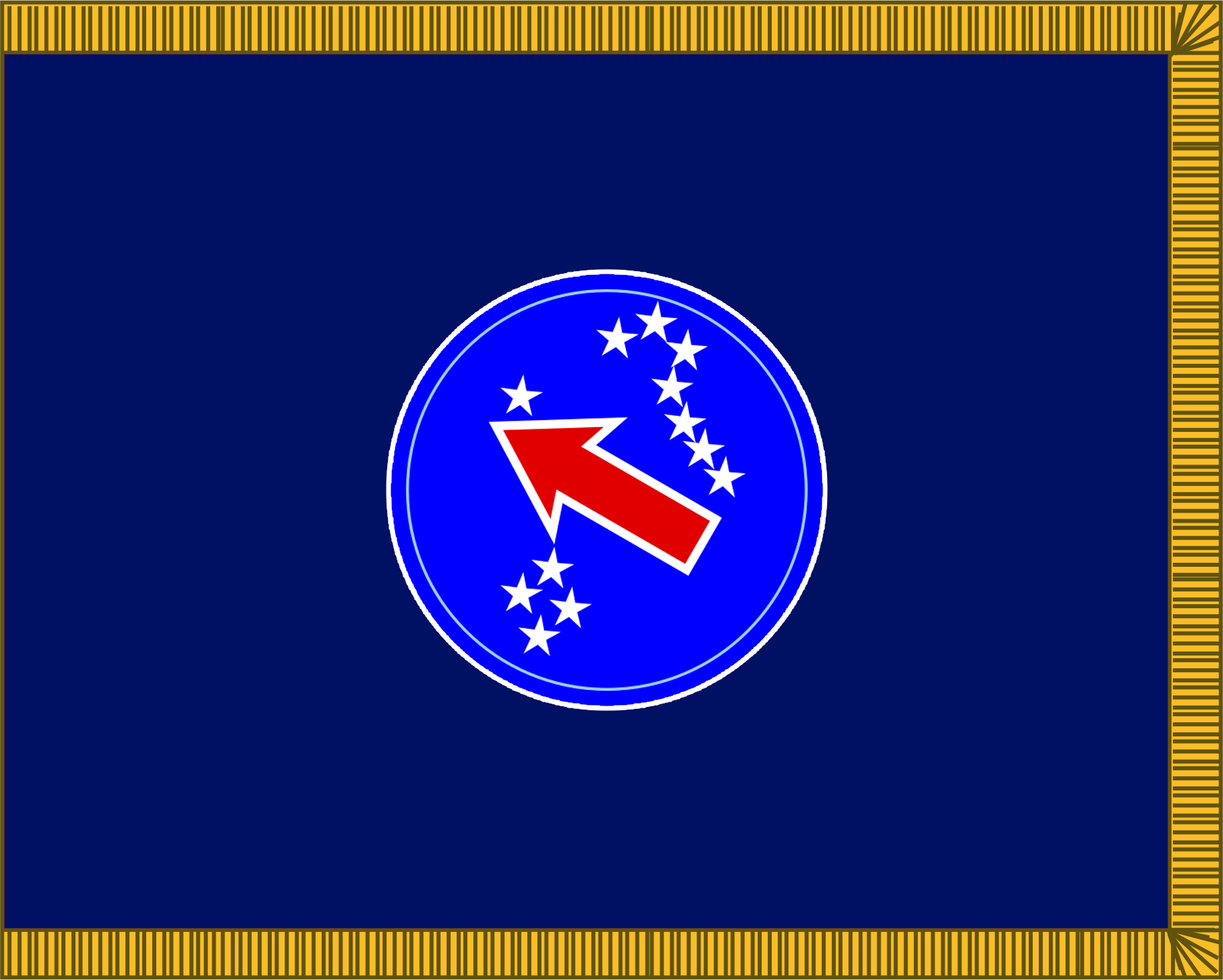
- US Army Pacific Flag

The United States Army Pacific (USARPAC) is an Army Service Component Command which serves as the Army component for United States Pacific Command (USPACOM). It may also serve as a Joint Task Force headquarters. The command has forces in Alaska, Hawaii, Japan, and South Korea. It also performs missions in Southeast Asia, in the countries stretching from the Philippines all the way to Bangladesh and India.

United States Forces Korea (USFK) has had operational command and control of U.S. forces in Korea since January 2012, and USARPAC headquarters oversees the manning, training, and equipping of Army forces assigned to USFK.

Subordinate units of this command have performed humanitarian missions in places as widely separated as Haiti, Cuba, and the Middle East.

== History ==
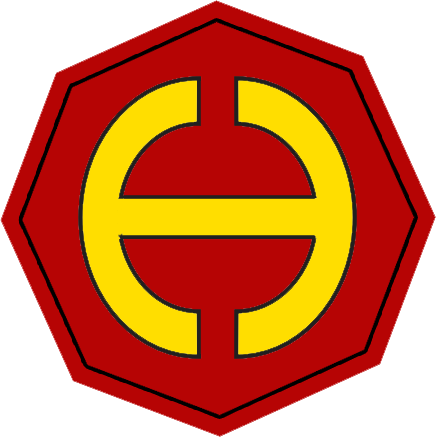
Hawaiian Department shoulder patch, approved 1922

The first U.S. Army formation established in Hawaii was the District of Hawaii, on 25 October 1910. It was succeeded on 1 October 1911, by the Department of Hawaii, and on 15 February 1913, by the Hawaiian Department. Brigadier General Montgomery M. Macomb was the first commander of the Hawaiian Department. Headquartered in the Alexander Young Hotel, it moved to Fort Shafter in 1921. The department also started wearing the red octagon insignia bearing the yellow letter "H." The colors symbolized Hawaiian royalty and the eight sides represented the main islands of Hawaii.

Lieutenant General Walter Short was commanding the Hawaiian Department in early December 1941, when the Japanese attack on Pearl Harbor took place. He was quickly recalled to the mainland. To replace him, Lieutenant General Delos Emmons was returned by General Henry "Hap" Arnold to Hawaii as commanding general of the Department on December 17, 1941, ten days after the attacks. He encouraged the creation of the Hawaii Defense Volunteers. He organized the replacement of the island's U.S. banknotes with new dollars overprinted with the word HAWAII; if the area were occupied, U.S. authorities could declare all marked dollars void and thereby render worthless all money which fell into enemy hands (by their capture of banks, businesses, etc.). He also requested Army Air Forces Headquarters to send additional planes and received them as rapidly as possible. Emmons built up the forces in Hawaii, anticipating the Battle of Midway. After Admiral Chester Nimitz became Commander-in-Chief, Pacific Ocean Areas in May 1942, the Hawaiian Department came under his command.

On 26 May 1943, General Robert C. Richardson Jr. arrived in Hawaii as the new commander of the Hawaiian Department. In July, he radically reorganized his command, placing the major air and ground forces in the area under seven major commands—all under his direct control. In recognition of the importance of shipping in an oceanic theater, he abolished the old Service Forces and created instead an Army Port and Service Command. A Hawaiian Artillery Command was also established, and a Department Reserve designated. All the combat divisions in the area, as well as those expected, were placed under separate command and a task force headquarters was formed in anticipation of future needs. Finally, Richardson appointed a deputy chief of staff for operations, who became, in effect, a War Plans officer.

On 14 August, Richardson assumed the title Commanding General, U.S. Army Forces, Central Pacific Area "by direction of the President."

The geographical extent of General Richardson's authority under this directive, as distinguished from his command of the Hawaiian Department, corresponded to the area delineated as the Central Pacific in Nimitz' original directive. It encompassed all the land and sea areas of the Pacific between the equator and the 42nd parallel, to the north (including Canton Island), except for that portion of MacArthur's South West Pacific Area that lay north of the equator and a small strip off the coast of South America. Within this vast region—of which only a small portion was in American hands—Richardson had responsibility for administration and training of all U.S. Army troops, whether ground or air. This responsibility included also supply, but the precise nature of these duties was left undefined pending his recommendations. General Richardson had no responsibility for operations other than to assist "in the preparation and execution of plans" involving Army forces in the area, "subject to the direction of the Commander-in-Chief, Pacific Ocean Areas."

In designating Richardson as Commanding General, U.S. Army Forces, Central Pacific Area, the War Department said nothing about his duties as Hawaiian Department commander. His responsibilities for both were about the same, but the older command—which carried certain additional legal responsibilities—had been established by Congress and could only be altered by that body. Did Richardson still retain those functions unique to the Hawaiian Department or had the new directive superseded the old? This confusion was quickly settled when the War Department on 18 September affirmed the continued existence of the Hawaiian Department under Richardson and stated explicitly what had been left implicit before—that its instructions to Richardson were not intended to affect the status of the Hawaiian Department.

Fort Shafter became a busy headquarters, and the barracks on Palm Circle were converted to offices. The major headquarters received the following names: U.S. Army Forces, Central Pacific Area (1943–44); U.S. Army Forces, Pacific Ocean Areas (1944–45); and U.S. Army Forces, Middle Pacific (1945–47). In 1944, the Army Corps of Engineers erected the "Pineapple Pentagon" (buildings T-100, T-101, and T-102) in just 49 days.

On 1 February 1947, the U.S. Army Forces, Middle Pacific became U.S. Army Pacific (USARPAC).

During the Korean War, USARPAC provided combat forces, training, and logistics. On 1 July 1957, USARPAC became a component of the U.S. Pacific Command.

During the Vietnam War, USARPAC provided similar support to United States Army Vietnam. After the war, the Army cut its presence in the region, since large amounts of combat forces in the Pacific were no longer needed. On 31 December 1974, USARPAC was inactivated. Army forces in Korea and Japan became separate major commands. In Hawaii, USARPAC headquarters was superseded by U.S. Army Support Command Hawaii (USASCH) and a Department of the Army field operating agency—the U.S. Army CINCPAC Support Group (USACSG).

The Army established United States Army Western Command (WESTCOM) on 23 March 1979 as a major command. WESTCOM was the Army component of the joint U.S. Pacific Command. The new WESTCOM took command of Army forces in Hawaii. In 1989, WESTCOM added United States Army Alaska from FORSCOM. In 1990, United States Army, Japan transferred under WESTCOM, losing its status as a major Army command.

In August 1990, WESTCOM was redesignated United States Army Pacific (USARPAC).

On 1 October 2000, USARPAC reorganized into an Army service component command.

Since the September 11 attacks, the command has played a major role in the homeland defense of the United States. To fill operational gaps, the command sent soldiers to the War in Afghanistan (2001–2021) and the Iraq War (U.S. phase, 2003–2011).

USARPAC has sent forces on multiple humanitarian missions, disaster relief, and defense support of civil authorities.

== Commander's responsibilities ==
- Responsible to Secretary of the Army for execution of 10 USC §7013(b) responsibilities
- Admins and supports army units assigned or attached to United States Indo-Pacific Command
- Reports to the Commander, United States Indo-Pacific Command

== Insignia Design ==
Designed in 1944, USARPAC's insignia reflects the axis of advance across the Central Pacific then underway. A blue disc symbolizes the heavens, with twelve white stars that show Polaris (the North Star), seven stars of the Big Dipper, and four stars of the distinctive Southern Cross. Polaris's sitting above the horizon indicates the latitude of Hawaii. Cutting across the star field is a red on white Arrow of War, unsupported in the sky, signifying the Armed forces is self-reliant. The colors red, white, and blue are symbolic of our national flag, and decoding the starts (12 total, 7, 4, 1) reveals a key date - December 7th, 1941.

== Organization ==
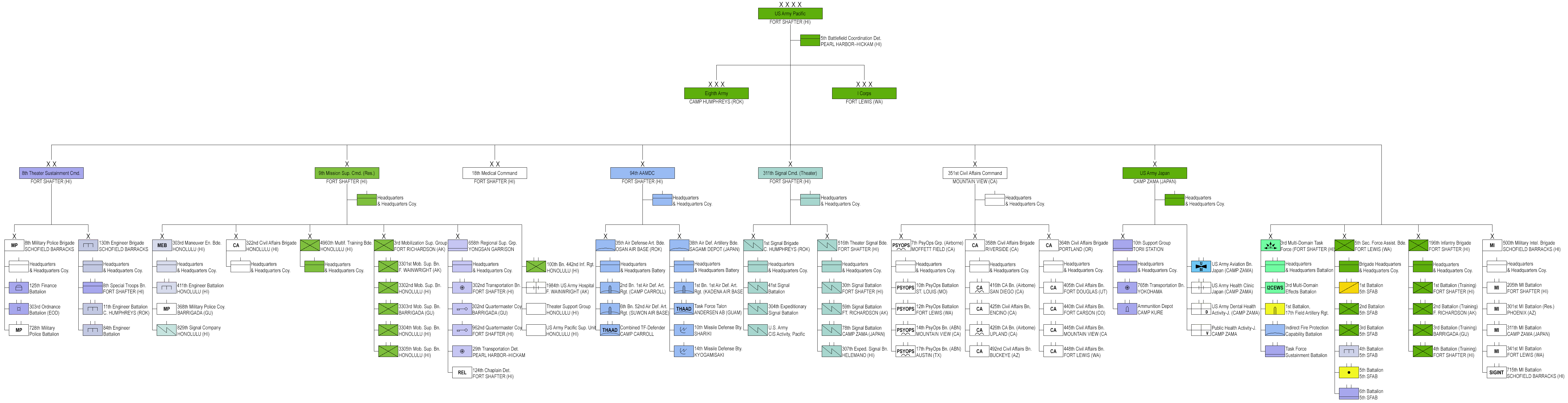
U.S. Army Pacific organization May 2026 (The organization graphics of Eighth Army and I Corps can be found in their respective articles)

- United States Army Pacific, at Fort Shafter (HI)
  - Eighth Army, at Camp Humphreys (South Korea)
    - 2nd Infantry Division, at Camp Humphreys (South Korea)
    - 501st Military Intelligence Brigade, at Camp Humphreys (South Korea)
    - 65th Medical Brigade, at Camp Humphreys (South Korea)
    - 19th Expeditionary Sustainment Command, at Camp Henry (South Korea)
  - I Corps, at Joint Base Lewis–McChord (WA)
    - 4th Infantry Division, at Fort Carson (CO)
    - 11th Airborne Division, at Joint Base Elmendorf–Richardson (AK)
    - 25th Infantry Division, at Schofield Barracks (HI)
    - 17th Field Artillery Brigade, at Joint Base Lewis–McChord (WA)
    - 22nd Corps Signal Brigade, at Joint Base Lewis–McChord (WA)
    - 201st Expeditionary Military Intelligence Brigade, at Joint Base Lewis–McChord (WA)
    - 555th Engineer Brigade, at Joint Base Lewis–McChord (WA)
    - 593rd Corps Sustainment Command, at Joint Base Lewis–McChord (WA)
  - 8th Theater Sustainment Command, at Fort Shafter (HI)
    - 8th Military Police Brigade, at Schofield Barracks (HI)
    - 130th Engineer Brigade, at Schofield Barracks (HI)
  - 9th Mission Support Command, Fort Shafter (HI) (U.S. Army Reserve)
    - 303rd Maneuver Enhancement Brigade, in Honolulu (HI)
    - 322nd Civil Affairs Brigade, in Honolulu (HI)
    - 4960th Multifunctional Training Brigade, in Honolulu (HI)
  - 18th Medical Command, Fort Shafter (HI)
  - 94th Army Air and Missile Defense Command, at Fort Shafter (HI)
    - 35th Air Defense Artillery Brigade, at Osan Air Base (South Korea) (supports Eighth Army)
    - 38th Air Defense Artillery Brigade, at Sagami General Depot (Japan) (supports United States Army Japan)
  - 311th Signal Command (Theater)
    - 1st Signal Brigade, at Camp Humphreys (South Korea) (supports Eighth Army)
    - 516th Theater Signal Brigade, Fort Shafter (HI)
  - 351st Civil Affairs Command, in Mountain View (CA)
    - 7th Psychological Operations Group (Airborne), at Moffett Field (CA)
    - 358th Civil Affairs Brigade, in Riverside (CA) (U.S. Army Reserve)
    - 364th Civil Affairs Brigade, in Portland (OR) (U.S. Army Reserve)
  - United States Army Japan, at Camp Zama (Japan)
    - 10th Support Group, at Torii Station (Japan)
  - 7th Infantry Division / Multi-Domain Command Pacific, at Joint Base Lewis–McChord (WA)
  - 3rd Multi-Domain Task Force, at Fort Shafter (HI)
  - 5th Security Force Assistance Brigade, at Joint Base Lewis-McChord (WA)
  - Joint Pacific Multinational Readiness Center (JPMRC) / 196th Infantry Brigade, Fort Shafter (HI) (U.S. Army Reserve)
  - 500th Military Intelligence Brigade, Schofield Barracks (HI), part of Army Intelligence and Security Command
  - 5th Battlefield Coordination Detachment, at Joint Base Pearl Harbor–Hickam (HI)

Former units include the U.S. Army Chemical Activity, Pacific, at Johnston Atoll, which traced some of its history to the 267th Chemical Company and the Project 112 biological warfare defense experiments. This became the Johnston Atoll Chemical Agent Disposal System, which was finally deactivated in 2001.

== Sources ==
- Dye, Bob, ed. (2010). Hawai'i chronicles III: World War Two in Hawai'i, from the pages of Paradise of the Pacific. Honolulu: University of Hawai'i Press. ISBN 978-0-8248-6276-3.
- Morton, Louis (1961). United States Army in World War II: The War in the Pacific: Strategy and Command: The First Two Years. Washington DC.: Center of Military History.
