= 100th Infantry Battalion =

U.S. military unit

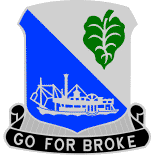
- Distinctive Unit Insignia of the 442nd Infantry Regiment
- Active: 1942–1946; 1947–present
- Allegiance: United States
- Branch: United States Army
- Type: Infantry battalion
- Size: 6 Companies
- Part of: 9th Mission Support Command
- Garrison/HQ: Fort Shafter
- Nicknames: "Purple Heart Battalion" "One-Puka-Puka"
- Motto: WWII - Remember Pearl Harbor Present - Go For Broke
- Engagements: World War II; Vietnam War; Iraq War
- Decorations: Presidential Unit Citation (Army) (5); Meritorious Unit Commendation (Army) (2)

Commanders
- Current commander: LTC Joseph E. Ensminger
- Command Sergeant Major: CSM John I. Keawe

Insignia
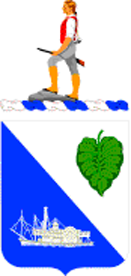
- Coat of arms of the 442nd Infantry Regiment

- Shoulder sleeve insignia and combat service identification badge of the 100th Battalion, 442nd Infantry Regiment

The 100th Infantry Battalion (Japanese: 第100歩兵大隊, Dai Hyaku Hohei Daitai) is the only infantry unit in the United States Army Reserve. In World War II, the then-primarily Nisei battalion was composed largely of former members of the Hawaii Army National Guard and trained at Camp McCoy, Wisconsin from June 1942 to January 1943. The 100th Infantry Battalion went to Camp Shelby, Mississippi in January 1943 for advanced training and left for overseas in August 1943. The 100th saw heavy combat during World War II, starting in September 1943 and continuing after being attached as a battalion of the Nisei 442nd Regimental Combat Team (RCT) in June 1944. The unit was unofficially nicknamed the Purple Heart Battalion, with the motto "Remember Pearl Harbor".

Quote: [Nearly a century later,] "the "Remember Pearl Harbor" 100th Infantry Battalion, and the "Go For Broke" 442d Regimental Combat Team is still the most decorated unit in U.S. military history. Members of this World War II unit earned over 18,000 individual decorations including over 4,000 Purple Hearts, and 21 Medals of Honor. The Combat Team earned five Presidential Citations in 20 days of Rhineland fighting, the only military unit ever to claim that achievement. General of the Army George C. Marshall praised the team saying, "they were superb: the men of the 100/442d... showed rare courage and tremendous fighting spirit... everybody wanted them." General Mark W. Clark (Fifth Army) said, "these are some the best... fighters in the U.S. Army. If you have more, send them over.""

Based at Fort Shafter, Honolulu, Hawaii, the 100th Battalion continues the legacy of the 442nd Infantry Regiment, officially designated as 100th Battalion/442nd Infantry Regiment. The 100th Battalion/442nd Infantry Regiment has maintained an alignment with the active 25th Infantry Division since a reorganization in 1972. This alignment has resulted in the 100th's mobilization for combat duty in the Vietnam War and the Iraq War. The 100th Infantry Battalion is staffed with reservists from Hawaii, American Samoa, Guam, Saipan and Washington. The battalion is subordinate to the 9th Mission Support Command.

== History ==
=== Background ===
On the morning of 7 December 1941, the Empire of Japan attacked Pearl Harbor, marking the beginning of World War II for the United States. After the attack, Japanese Americans and those of Japanese descent faced prejudice at home. Chaos ensued in the hours that followed the Pearl Harbor attack, but the 298th and 299th Hawaii National Guard prepared for an invasion, cleared the rubble, donated their blood, and aided the wounded. However, three days after the attack, the unit's rifles were stripped from them because of the ethnicity of members; eventually those rifles were returned. Nisei that were a part of the ROTC program at the University of Hawaii were discharged from the Hawaii Territorial Guard. Those former members eventually formed the Varsity Victory Volunteers.

At 11:30 a.m. martial law was declared, and Governor Joseph Poindexter told President Franklin D. Roosevelt that his greatest fear was sabotage by the large Japanese population in Hawaii. The FBI rounded up known Japanese sympathizers, Buddhist priests, language school principals and teachers, civic and business leaders, fishermen, and instructors of Judo and related martial arts. The War Department reassigned soldiers of Japanese ancestry on the mainland, had all Japanese Americans on the West Coast rounded up and placed in internment camps around the U S, discharged those of Japanese descent from the Hawaii Territorial Guard, and had all Japanese Americans reclassified as 4-C: enemy aliens.

General Delos Carleton Emmons, appointed military governor on 17 December, supported placing Japanese Americans in internment camps and having them reclassified as enemy aliens, but he wanted to give them a chance to prove their patriotism. After General Emmons agreed to let the Varsity Victory Volunteers form, a confidential memo was sent to the War Department in early April 1942 stating that 2,000 Japanese American soldiers served, and many more who wished to serve to demonstrate their loyalty to the United States. Their desire was to organize into a fighting force to be sent to Europe or Africa to fight the Germans and Italians, but the request was later denied by the War Department.

=== Formation ===
As the Battle of Midway was well underway on 4 June 1942, 1,432 Nisei of the Hawaii National Guard boarded the U.S. Army transport USAT Maui, formerly a Matson liner, under the cover of night and were shipped to the mainland without saying goodbye to their family or loved ones. Under the title "Hawaiian Provisional Infantry Battalion" the week-long zigzag journey took them to a port in Oakland where they were designated the 100th Infantry Battalion (Separate) on 12 June 1942. The unit number was an indication of the Army's recently formulated plan for a modern organization for Combat Arms. Under normal pre-war Army procedures, all infantry battalions were organic to the regiment they were a part of and were known as, for instance, "1st Battalion, 5th Regiment." With the new system of organization, the infantry regiment was reorganized as a headquarters with no organic battalions, but with three separate battalions attached. The headquarters was organized into three combat commands that could be dispatched on separate combat actions with units that were attached. One infantry battalion would be assigned to a combat command, with attachments from the higher headquarters reserve. The 100th, however, was not initially attached to a regiment. It came to be known unofficially as the "One-Puka-Puka" (Puka means "hole" in Hawaiian).

=== Camp McCoy and Camp Shelby ===
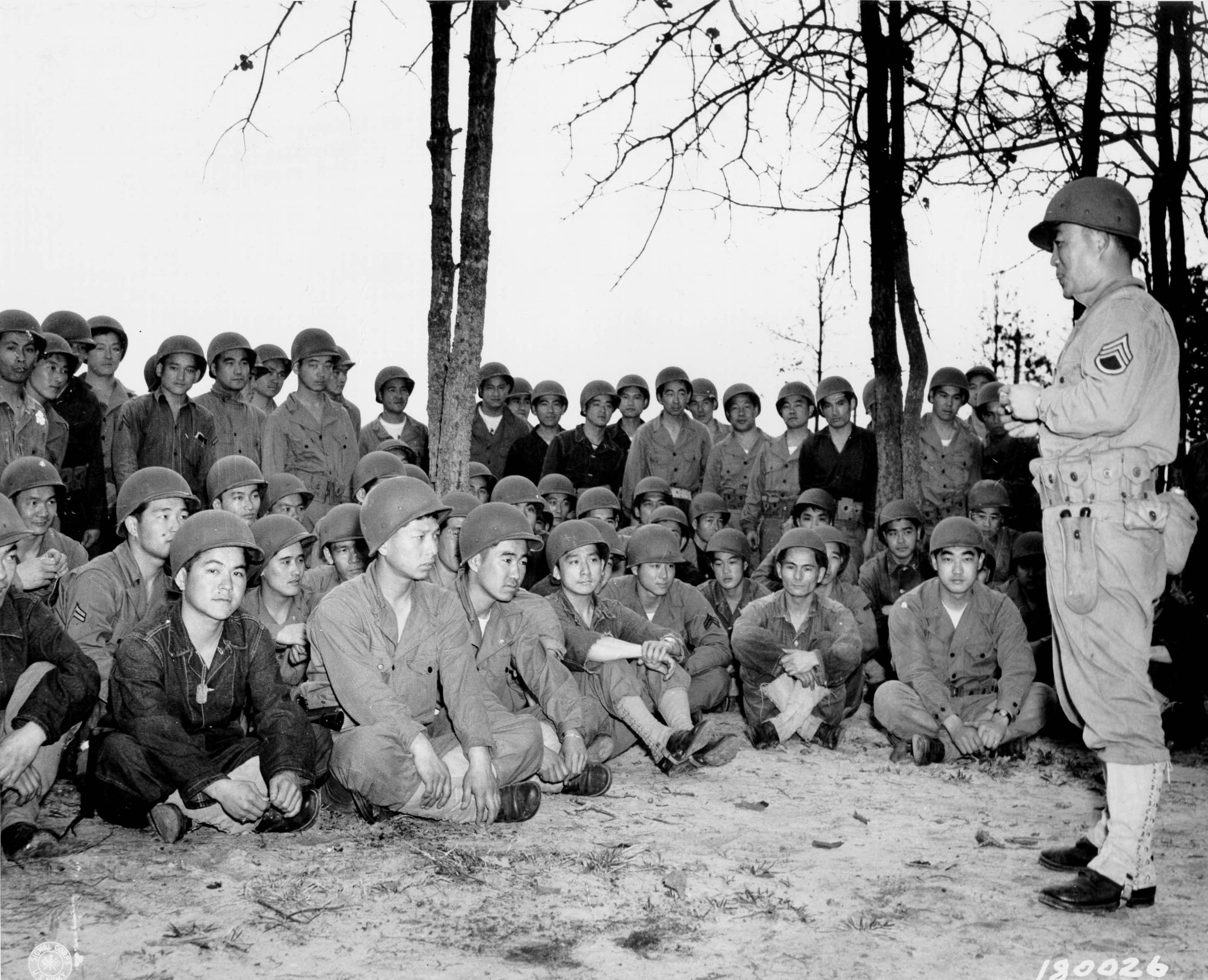
100th Infantry soldiers receiving training in the use of grenades in 1943

In Oakland, the 100th boarded a train to their final destination, Camp McCoy, Wisconsin. Immediately following their arrival to Camp McCoy many of the Nisei felt animosity and distrust from fellow soldiers and military and political leaders. The 100th was quartered in tents, four soldiers per tent, which contained a bunk bed, blanket, towels, and backpack. It would be several months until the Nisei moved into military barracks. Eventually soldiers were permanently placed into military units, such as Companies A through F, and pushed through physical, marksmanship, and tactical training.

Some of the white officers and NCO's appointed to the 100th were schooled in psychology and were ordered to test the recruits' physical capabilities, military capabilities, and loyalty. The Nisei competed with other companies in marksmanship, baseball, softball, physical combat such as scuffles, boxing, and wrestling.

On one such occasion that happened to prove the loyalty and bravery of the new recruits, five Nisei soldiers received the Soldier's Medal for their rescue of several local civilians from drowning on a frozen Wisconsin lake. On one occasion, about 25 of the Japanese-American soldiers were sent to a secret training mission on a small island, Cat Island, near the mouth of the Mississippi River. Some top military officers thought that the "Jap" soldiers smelled differently, and that the Nisei soldiers would give off a similar scent. So for three months these 25 Nisei were ordered to train attack dogs to "smell Japs." The training didn't work.

Training at Camp McCoy lasted six months until on 6 January 1943 the 100th Battalion was transferred to Camp Shelby, Mississippi. The 100th was attached to the 85th Division under Major General Wade Haislip and would receive even tougher training than they did at Camp McCoy. Upon arrival at Camp Shelby the 100th received the same amount of skepticism as they did at McCoy. The 100th successfully passed the training exercises. At Camp Shelby where 100th received its most intense and advanced training and then was sent to Camp Clairborne, Louisiana for field exercises and war games.

On return from Camp Clairborne, the 100th met up with the newly formed 442nd Regimental Combat Team on 16 July. On 20 July 1943 the 100th received its battalion colors and motto, "Remember Pearl Harbor," as requested by the unit.

=== Africa and Italy ===
After training at Camp McCoy, Wisconsin, and Camp Shelby, Mississippi, the battalion deployed from Shelby on 11 August by train to Camp Kilmer, New Jersey and then to the Mediterranean on 21 August 1943.

The 100th arrived in Oran, North Africa on 2 September 1943 but was refused by General Dwight D. Eisenhower, then the commander of the North African Theater of Operations. Lieutenant General Mark Wayne Clark, commanding the United States Fifth Army, accepted the offer, and the 100th became a part of the 133rd Infantry Regiment, 34th Infantry Division, in place of the regiment's 2nd Battalion that had been assigned to guard General Eisenhower's headquarters in Oran, North Africa, and took part in training with white soldiers. On 19 September, the 34th Division sailed from Africa to southeast of Naples, with the 100th with them.

The unit were to fight in the Italian Campaign and entered combat on 29 September 1943, near Salerno in Southern Italy. The unit advanced 15 miles (24 km) in 24 hours for a week against strong enemy resistance which allowed them to take Benevento, an important rail center and road intersection. The 100th crossed the Volturno River three times, taking on heavy German machine gun fire and rocket launchers before driving the German force even further north.

=== Monte Cassino ===
When you read that a town was taken, or a certain hill was taken, remember that in the process of that accomplishment lives of fine fellows were lost, and also, that during this accomplishment for the participants, life was a horrifying massacre. You lose your buddies-fellows with whom you laughed, ate, slept, sweated. They grow to be more than mere buddies. They become blood relations to you and they die before your eyes-not a pleasant, natural death, but an unimaginable kind of mutilation mixed with groans and prayers ending with a gurgling last breath. Only five minutes ago you might have been laughing with that buddy of yours.

— C. Douglas Sterner, Go For Broke: The Nisei Warriors of World War II Who Conquered Germany, Japan, and American Bigotry

At the top of Monte Cassino stood a grand but old monastery, a key target for the 5th Army. To take the Gustav Line, the Allies would have to descend into the Rapido River valley, traverse two miles of open fields filled with landmines, mud, and knee-deep cold water, cross a swift-moving river, and barbed wire and up the steep, rocky slopes, to the 1500-foot peak of Monte Cassino. From there they would have to ascend still higher to a four-story fortress, with 10-foot-thick stone walls. This was the St. Benedictine monastery. The battle commenced in January. Here they earned their nickname the "Purple Heart Battalion." At night, A and C companies passed their way through the river reaching the wall where the enemy was located and held their ground under intense fire into the next day. B Company was met with heavy machine gun fire as their cover by the smoke screen was blown away leaving only 14 of the original 187 men in B Company to reach the wall.

During the first daylight hours our battalion observation post started with 26 individuals including the artillery liaison team communication people and the intelligence section. By nightfall only four of us were left. Major Clough, our Battalion Commander, and myself (Captain Kim) in one location and Pfc Ginger Minami and Private Irving Akahoshi in another location, 20 yards away. Everyone else was either dead or wounded. Major Clough was ordered by Colonel Marshall, 133rd Regiment Commander, to commit "B" Company across the open flats at daybreak. Jim protested that this was a suicide mission. Lieutenant Colonel Moses, the 1st Battalion Commander, to our right, had orders to also commit his reserve company. He protested and said he would personally lead his company because he could not issue such an order without sharing their danger. However, if he survived, he would prefer court martial charges against Colonel Marshall.

— Captain Young-Oak Kim, a Korean-American from Los Angeles who served in the unit from 1943 to 1944.

The three companies were immediately pulled back to San Micheli the next night. The 100th then was ordered to take Castle Hill, which they did on 8 February. The hill was held for four days dealing with not only machine gun fire but tanks as well. The hill was a key location for it was close to the monastery but the 34th Division's right and left flanks were unable to hold their positions because of heavy German resistance. The 100th was again ordered back.

After three days of bombing, the second assault commenced. In one platoon of the 100th only five of forty soldiers survived. The 100th again was pulled back into reserve and replaced by British and Indian soldiers after nearly taking Cassino. War correspondents calling the 100th's soldiers "little men of iron" and the "purple heart battalion." This would be the last time Nisei of the original 100th would see combat at Monte Cassino as they were taken back to San Michele to rest and reorganize. From that point on, for the rest of the war, replacements from the new volunteer 442nd Regimental Combat Team began filling its ranks.

There were over 50,000 allied casualties in the battle. Casualties took the 100th's numbers from 1300 5 months prior to nearly 500. Cassino didn't fall until 17 May. After Cassino, the 100th began to receive its first replacements from the 442nd. The battalion was later awarded the Distinguished Unit Citation (later redesignated the Presidential Unit Citation) for its actions on 26–27 June.

=== Anzio, Rome, and the 442nd ===
In March 1944, the 133rd Infantry's 2nd Battalion rejoined the regiment, but the 100th Battalion still remained perpetually associated with the 34th Infantry Division. Following Monte Cassino, the 100th was soon deployed at the Anzio beachhead on 26 March 1944. The allies held a beachhead that spanned 15 miles (24 km) going a few miles inland. The battlefield at Anzio was very similar to battlefields in World War I as there was a large stretch of land between the opposing forces declared "No Man's Land" and neither side launched a large-scale offensive. Instead, attacks were made at night, with soldiers sleeping during the day. The fall of Monte Cassino finally led to the end of the stalemate on 17 May 1944. On 23 May the allies went on the offensive to drive the Germans north. However, the allies needed more information about the enemy, so the 100th was ordered to capture a German soldier. Lieutenant Young-Oak Kim, a Korean American born in Los Angeles, California, and Nisei PFC Irving Akahoshi from the 100th volunteered for the mission and captured two German soldiers. On the push to Rome, Lanuvio, the final German stronghold, fell to the 100th Infantry Battalion.

"We had been sitting and living in foxholes at Anzio some 63 days. Then the big push out and the capture of Rome. They (100th Battalion) wiped out the last heavy German resistance we met some 12 miles south of Rome and then it was practically a walk into the city."

The 100th was ordered to stay at the roadside on 4 June 10 kilometers from Rome. They watched other troops march by and never saw Rome. Instead, the 100th was taken 40 miles (64 km) northwest of Rome to Civitavecchia where on 11 June 1944, the 100th was assigned to the newly arrived 442nd Regimental Combat Team as its 1st Battalion. Because of its combat record, the 100th was allowed to keep their original designation, giving the newly formed all-Nisei fighting unit the name 100th/442nd Regimental Combat Team, attached to the 34th Infantry Division.

=== Demobilization and rebirth ===
The 442nd RCT was deactivated in Honolulu in 1946, but reactivated in 1947 in the U.S. Army Reserve. It was mobilized in 1968 to refill the Strategic Reserve during the Vietnam War, and carries on the honors and traditions of the unit. Today, the 100th Battalion, 442nd Infantry, is the only ground combat unit of the Army Reserve. The battalion headquarters is at Fort Shafter, Hawaii, with subordinate units based in Hilo, American Samoa, Saipan, Guam, and Washington. The only military presence in American Samoa consists of the battalion's B company.

In August 2004, the battalion was mobilized for duty in Iraq. Stationed at Logistics Support Area Anaconda in the city of Balad, which is located about 50 miles northwest of Baghdad. Lt. Colonel Colbert Low assumed command of the battalion only a few weeks after the battalion arrived at Logistical Support Area Anaconda. In early 2006, the 100th had returned home. One soldier was killed by an improvised explosive device attack. Four members of the battalion were killed in action, and several dozen injured, before the battalion returned home. During the year-long deployment, one of Charlie Company's attached platoons, discovered over 50 weapons caches. Unlike the soldiers of World War II who were predominantly Japanese Americans, these soldiers came from as far away as Miami, Florida, Tennessee, Alaska and included soldiers from Hawaii, Philippines, Samoa and Palau. For their actions in Iraq the unit received the Meritorious Unit Commendation.

The unit was once again deployed in 2009. The unit was called up alongside the 3rd brigade, 25th Infantry Division; and was assigned as an element of the 29th Infantry Brigade Combat Team. Nominally deployed to Kuwait, it conducted patrols into Iraq, leading to two fatalities; those patrols consisted of more than a million miles of driving conducting convoy duty. During the unit's deployment, several dozen of the unit's American Samoan servicemembers became naturalized U.S. citizens while in Kuwait.

In October 2021, C Company officially moved from American Samoa to Joint Base Lewis–McChord in Washington.

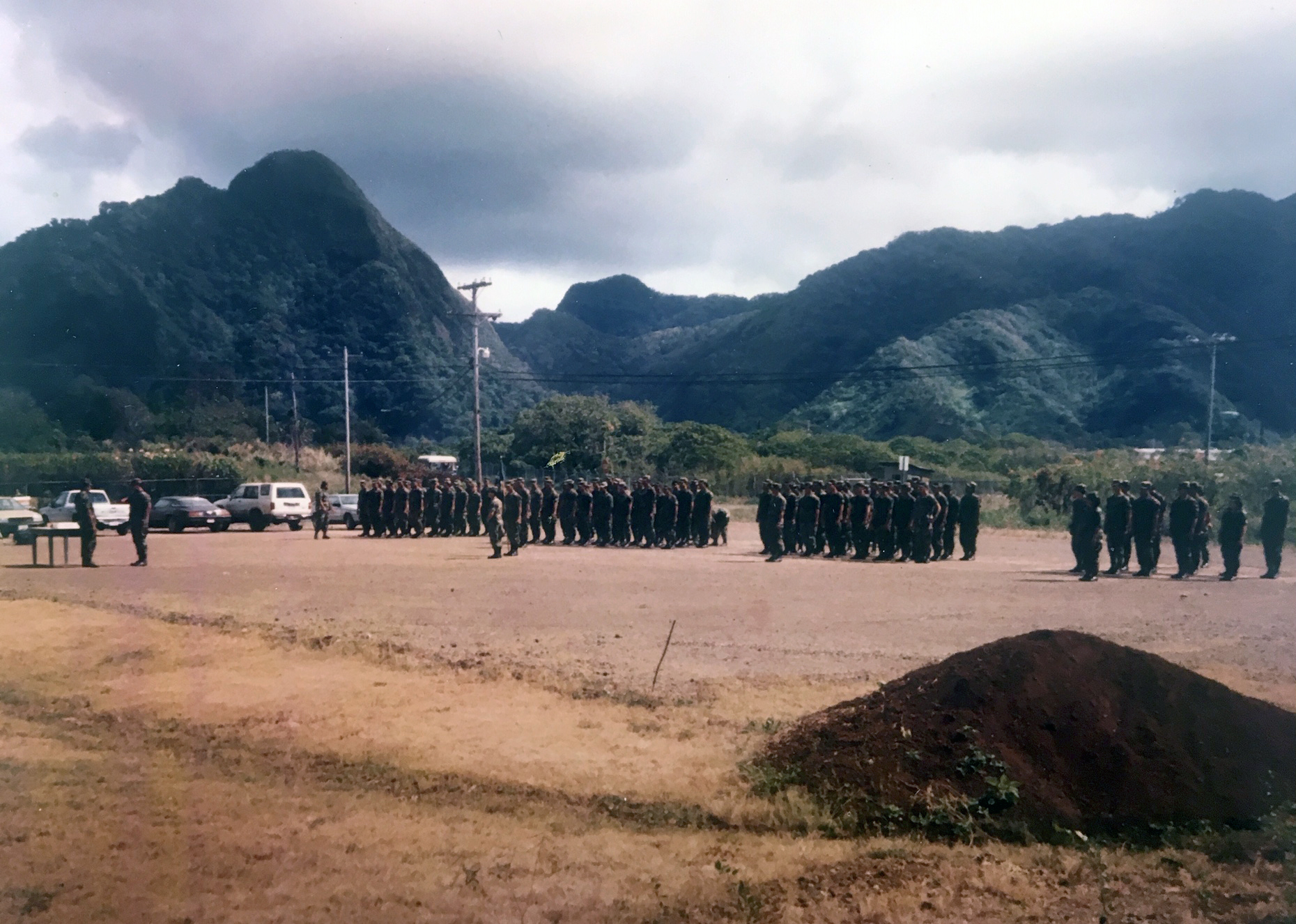
Soldiers from the 100th Infantry Battalion gather in formation during an exercise in American Samoa in 1987.

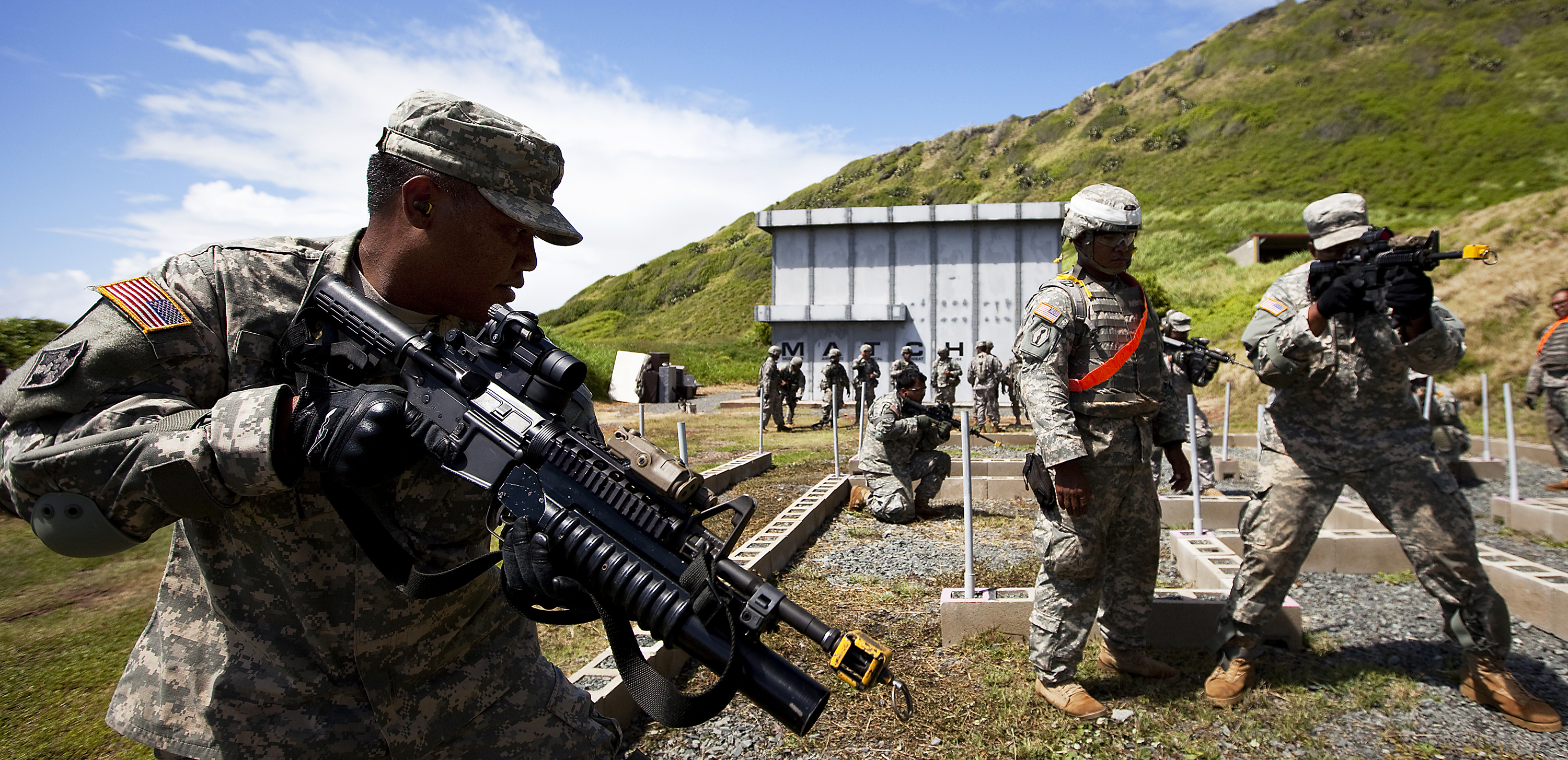
Soldiers of E Company, 100th/442nd train at Marine Corps Base Hawaii in 2011

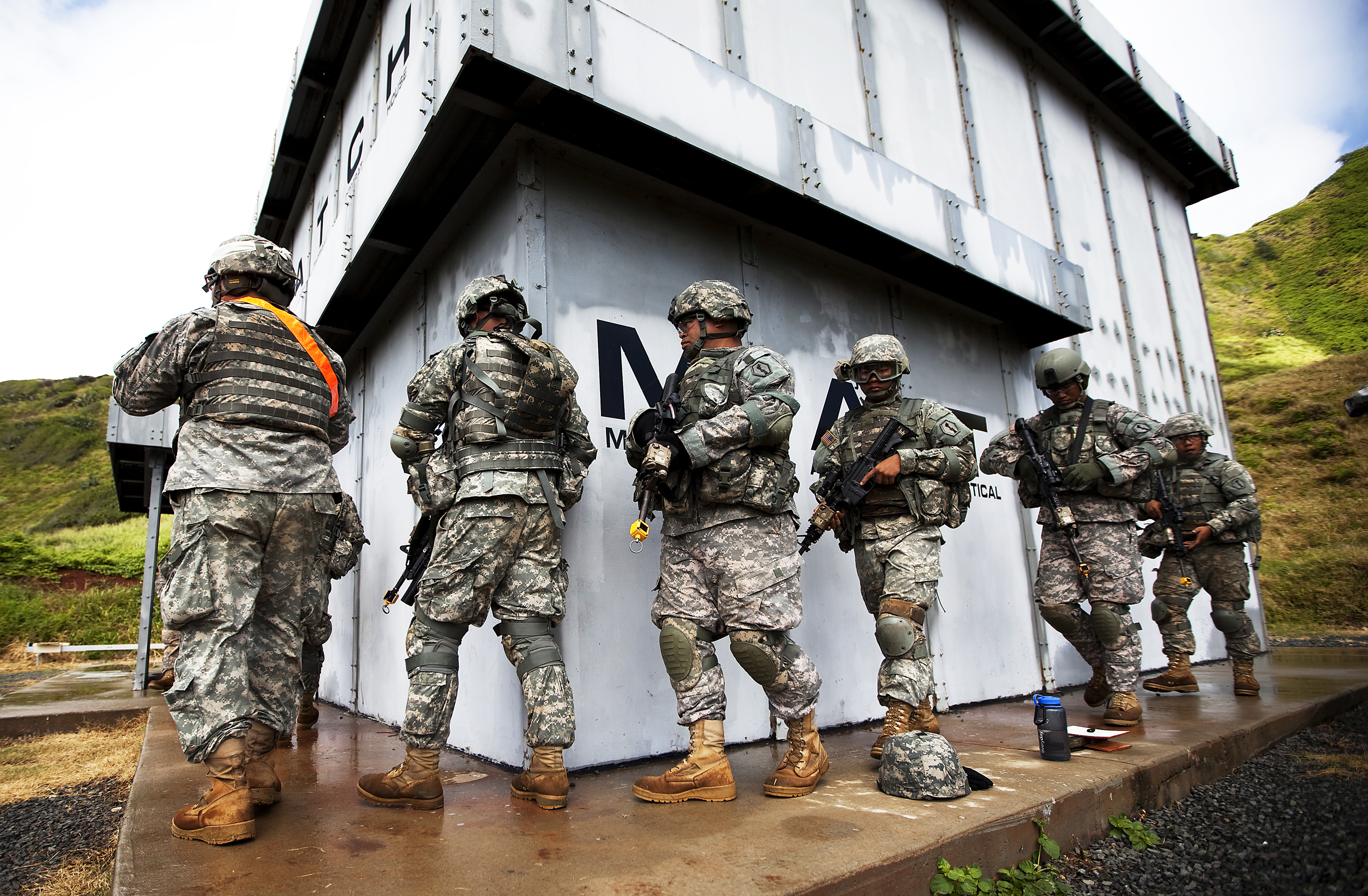
Soldiers of E Company, 100th/442nd train in Hawaii in 2011.

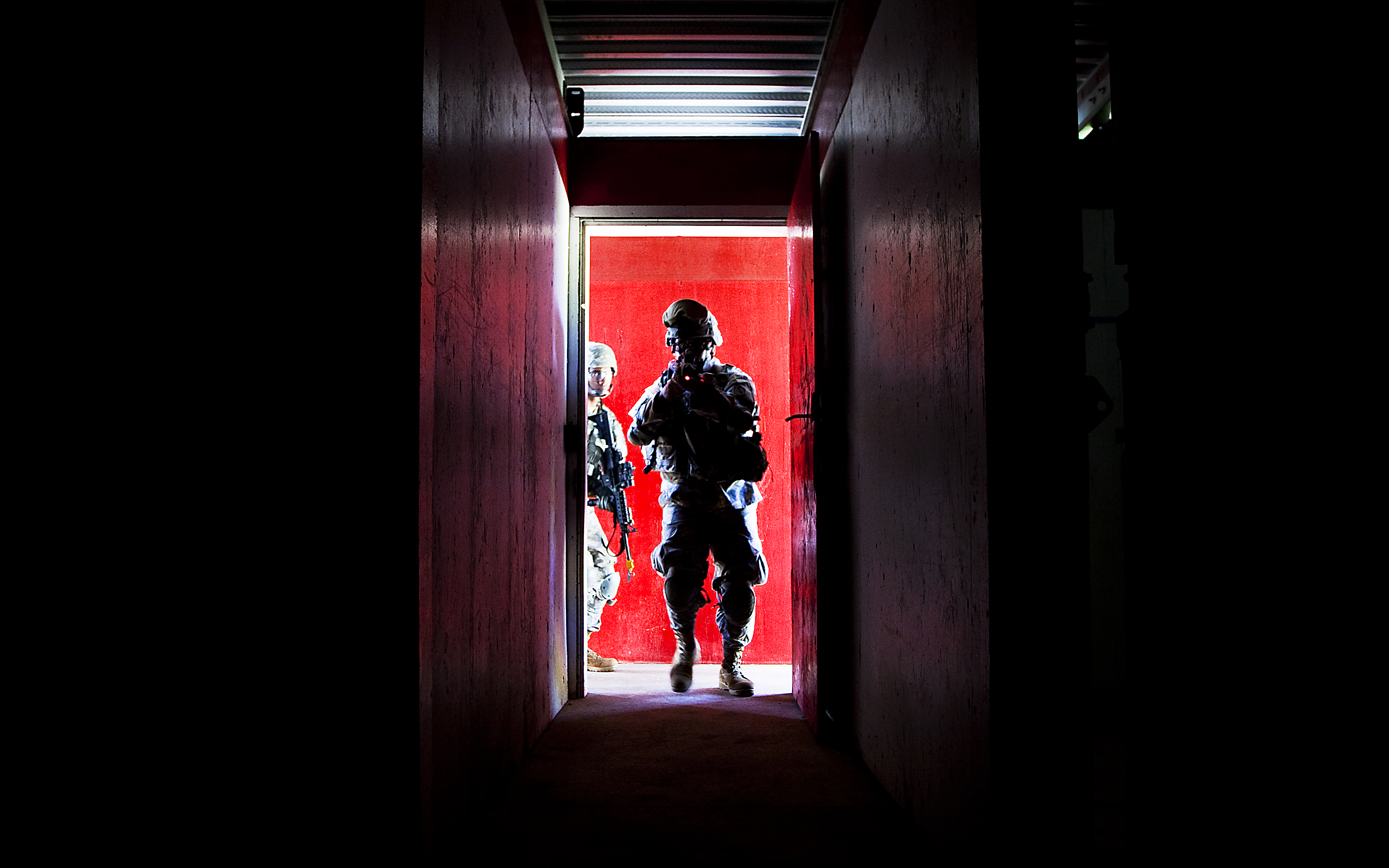
A team leader with E Company, 100th/442nd breaches the entrance of the "shoot house".

==== Organization 2025 ====
- 100th Battalion / 442nd Infantry Regiment, at Fort Shafter (HI)
  - Headquarters and Headquarters Company, at Fort Shafter (HI)
    - Detachment 1, Headquarters and Headquarters Company, in Hilo (HI)
  - Bravo Company, 100th Infantry Battalion, in Tafuna (American Samoa)
  - Charlie Company, 100th Infantry Battalion, at Joint Base Lewis–McChord (WA)
  - Delta Company, 100th Infantry Battalion, at Fort Shafter (HI)
  - Echo Company, 100th Infantry Battalion, in Barrigada (Guam)
    - Detachment 1, Echo Company, 100th Infantry Battalion, in Tanapag (Saipan)
  - 740th Forward Support Company, at Fort Shafter (HI)

== Recognition ==
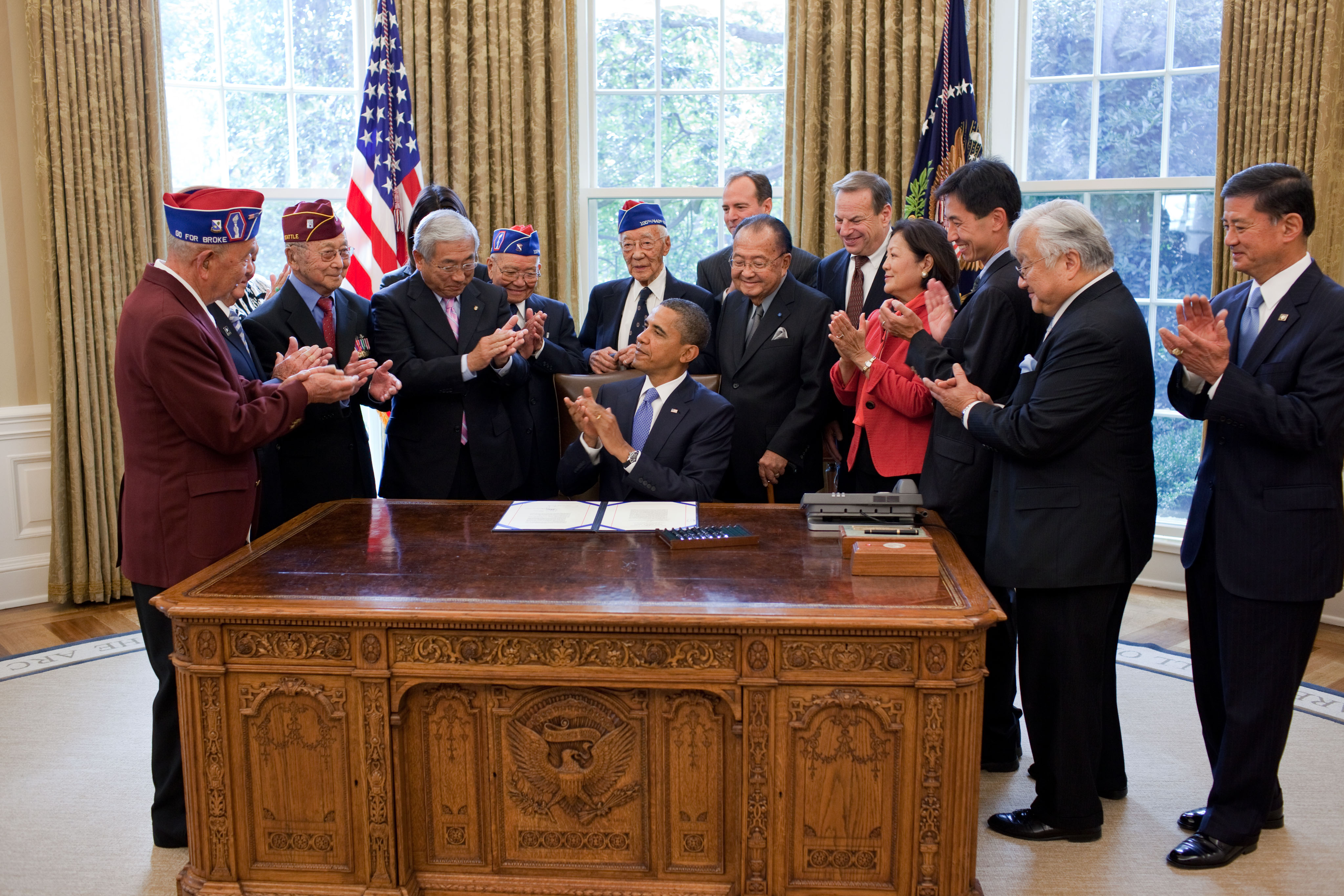
President Obama with surviving veterans of the 100th after signing S.1055, a bill to grant the unit the Congressional Gold Medal.

The nation's highest award for combat valor, the Medal of Honor, was conferred upon twenty-one members of the 100th Infantry Battalion and the 442nd Regimental Combat Team of World War II.

On 5 October 2010, Congress approved the granting of the Congressional Gold Medal to the 442nd Regimental Combat Team and the 100th Infantry Battalion, as well as the 6,000 Japanese Americans who served in the Military Intelligence Service during the war. The Nisei Soldiers of World War II Congressional Gold Medal was collectively presented on 2 November 2011.

In 2012, the surviving members of the 442nd RCT were made chevaliers of the French Légion d'Honneur for their actions contributing to the liberation of France during World War II and their heroic rescue of the Lost Battalion outside of Biffontaine.

== Lineage following World War II ==
- Inactivated 15 August 1946 at Honolulu, Hawaii
- Allotted 27 March 1947 to the Organized Reserves
- Activated 31 July 1947 with headquarters at Fort DeRussy, Hawaii
- Organized Reserves redesignated 25 March 1948 as the Organized Reserve Corps;
- Organized Reserve Corps redesignated 9 July 1952 as the Army Reserve
- Reorganized and redesignated 29 May 1959 as the 100th Battle Group, 442d Infantry
- Reorganized and redesignated 1 May 1964 as the 100th Battalion, 442d Infantry
- Ordered into active military service 13 May 1968 at Fort DeRussy, Hawaii; released from active military service 12 December 1969 and reverted to reserve status
- Location of headquarters changed 1 September 1994 to Fort Shafter, Hawaii
- Ordered into active military service 16 August 2004 at Fort Shafter, Hawaii
- Redesignated 1 October 2005 as the 100th Battalion, 442d Infantry Regiment
- Released from active military service 13 March 2006 and reverted to reserve status
- Ordered into active military service 19 August 2008 at Fort Shafter, Hawaii; released from active military service 22 September 2009 and reverted to reserve status

== Campaign participation credit ==
- World War II:
  - Naples-Foggia;
  - Anzio;
  - Rome-Arno;
  - North Apennines;
  - Rhineland;
  - Po Valley
- War on Terrorism:
  - Iraq:
    - Iraqi Governance
    - National Resolution

== Decorations ==
- Presidential Unit Citation (Army) for BELVEDERE
- Presidential Unit Citation (Army) for BIFFONTAINE AND FORET DOMANIALE DE CHAMP
- Presidential Unit Citation (Army) for BIFFONTAINE (earned by 3d Battalion)
- Presidential Unit Citation (Army) for FRANCE AND ITALY (earned by 2d Battalion)
- Presidential Unit Citation (Army) for GOTHIC LINE
- Meritorious Unit Commendation (Army) for IRAQ 2005–2006
- Meritorious Unit Commendation (Army) for IRAQ 2008-2009

== See also ==
- Go For Broke!, a film that dramatizes the lives and wartime experiences of the 442nd Regimental Combat Team and the 100th Infantry Battalion's Hawaiian troops.
- Go For Broke Monument
- Only the Brave (2006), an independent film directed by Lane Nishikawa, which is a fictional account of the rescue of the Lost Battalion.
- Japanese American internment
- Japanese American Memorial to Patriotism During World War II
- Japanese American service in World War II
- Military history of Asian Americans
