= 9th Mission Support Command =

Support command within the U.S. Army Reserve Command

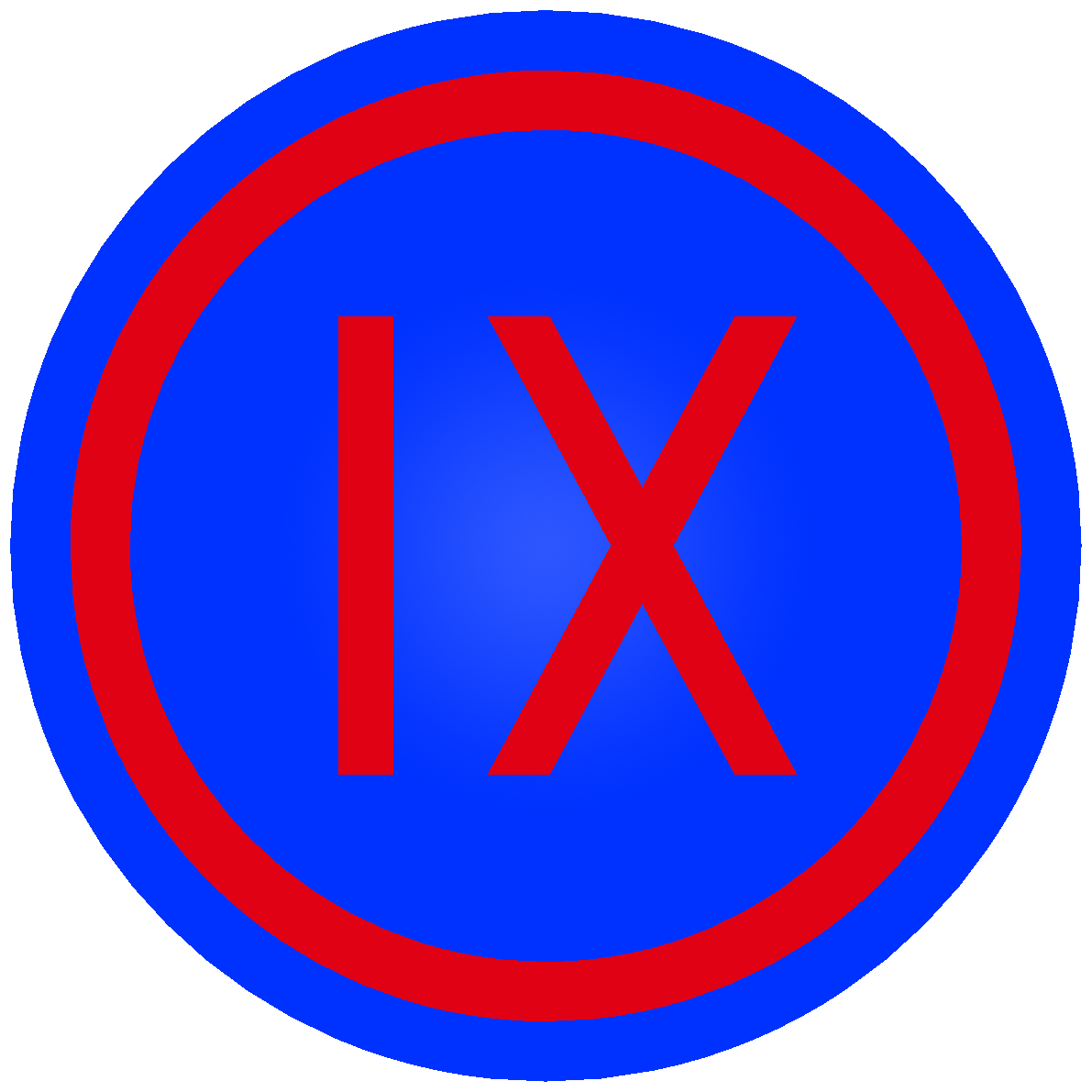
- 9th MSC shoulder sleeve insignia
- Active: 1 Jun 1940 – Mar 1950; 10 Aug 1950 - Present
- Country: United States
- Allegiance: United States of America
- Branch: United States Army
- Type: Engineer, Infantry, Support, Civil Affairs
- Part of: United States Army Pacific
- Garrison/HQ: Fort Shafter, Hawaii
- Engagements: World War II; Operation Iraqi Freedom

Commanders
- Current commander: Brig. Gen. Katherine A. Trombley
- Command Sergeant Major: CSM Paul Fulmer

Insignia
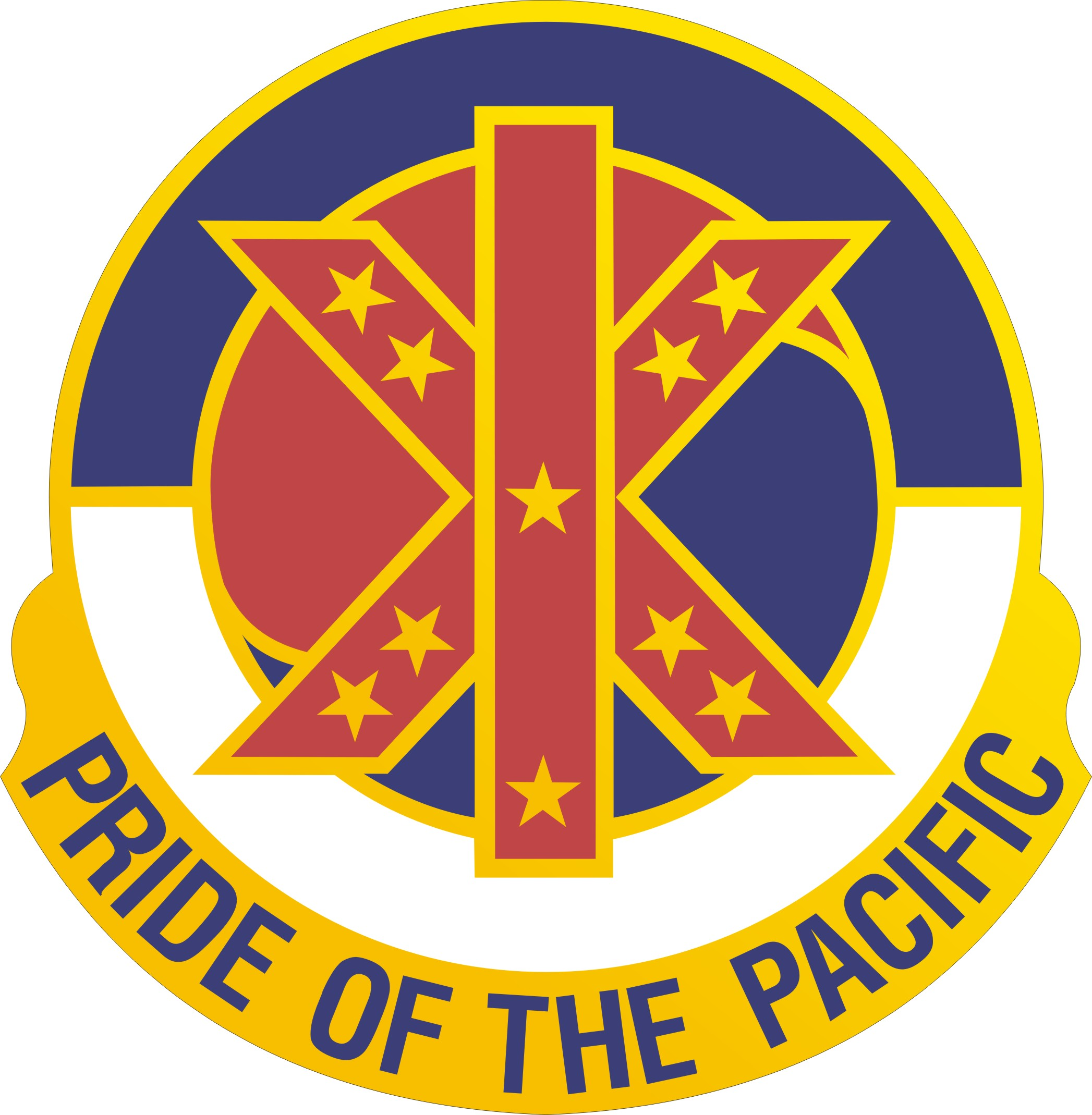
- 9th Mission Support Command DUI

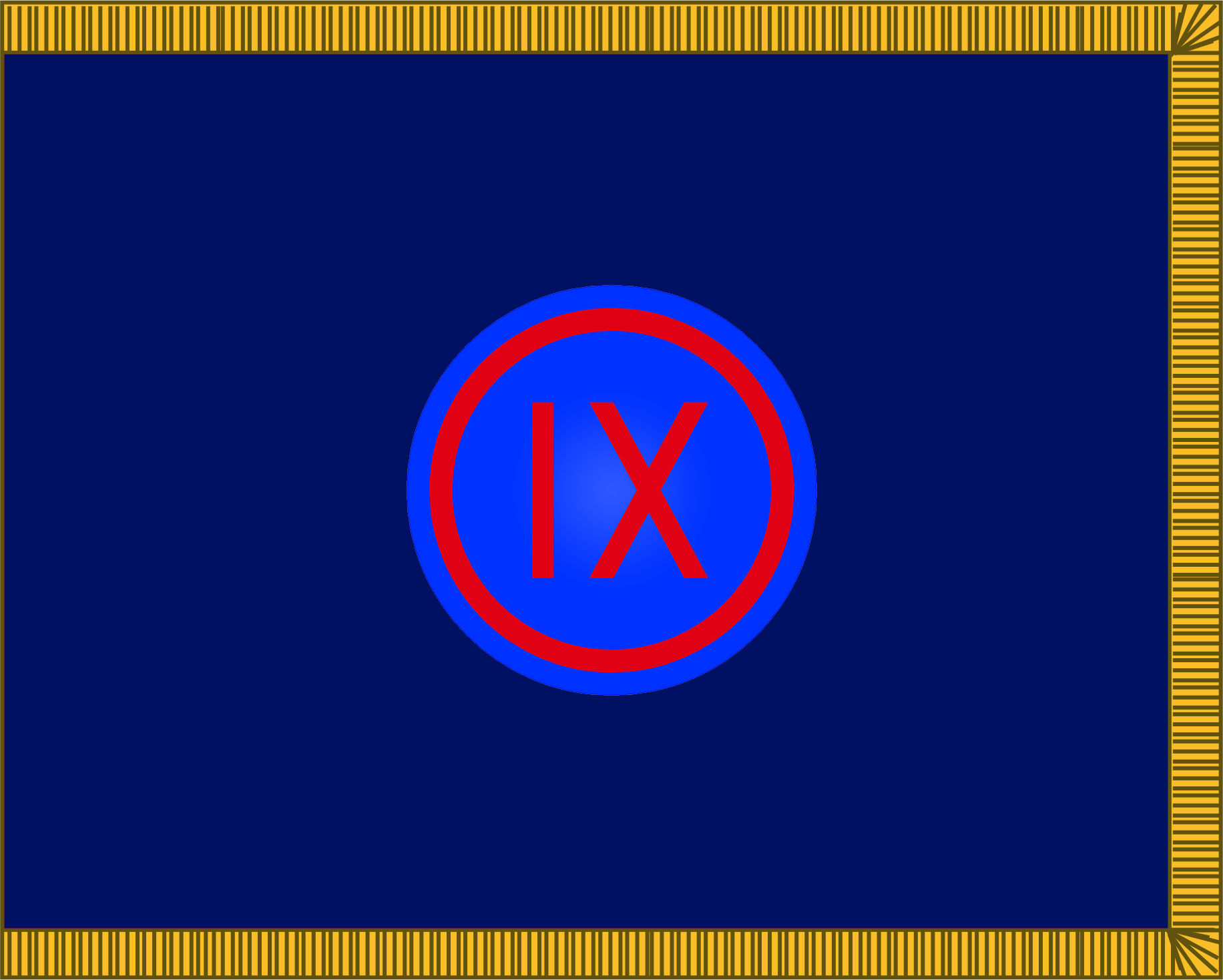
- 9th Mission Support Command Flag

9th Mission Support Command (9th MSC) is a United States Army Reserve unit located in Fort Shafter, Honolulu, Hawai'i.

The 9th Mission Support Command is a U.S. Army Reserve Command under the operational control of U.S. Army Pacific. Headquartered in Honolulu, Hawaii, the command consists of approximately 3,500 Army Reserve Soldiers and 160 civilians throughout the Pacific, including Hawaii, Alaska, American Samoa, Japan, Korea, Guam and Saipan.

The 9th MSC is engaged throughout the Asia-Pacific realm, providing trained and ready forces to overseas contingency operations, playing a vital role in approximately 20 U.S. Army Pacific Theater Security Cooperation Program exercises, and providing key battle staff in support of Joint Task Force Homeland Defense.

The 9th Mission Support Command (MSC) was originally designated as the IX Corps (Augmentation) and was organized on January 16, 1962. At that time it was an integral part of the Active Army’s IX Corps. The IX Corps headquarters was first constituted on July 29, 1921 in the Organized Reserves to provide Command to Reserve Units. Though the Corps was not activated, it remained on the organizational rolls of the Army, to be called on when needed. On October 1, 1933, the Corps was moved to the Active Duty roster, though it remained deactivated.

In 1940, it was activated at Ft. Lewis, Washington. It immediately began training of combat units in preparation for deployment. One year later, IX Corps took Command of the Camp Murray staging area in Washington, responsible for training Army National Guard forces, Active Duty and Reserve Units. Following the attack on Pearl Harbor in late 1941, IX Corps was assigned to defensive duties on the West Coast of the United States. In 1944 it was deployed to Leyte Gulf, Philippine Islands, where it was placed in charge of preparing the Tenth U.S. Army for the invasion of Okinawa. In Leyte, IX Corps was tasked with the planning of Operation Olympic, the invasion of the home islands of Japan, specifically the island of Kyushu. After World War II it was assigned to the Eighth U.S. Army for occupation duty in Japan.

The IX Corps was inactivated in March 1950, but was reactivated in August that same year at Ft. Sheridan, Illinois. It was sent to Korea, where it participated in the successful expulsion of communist forces from South Korea. For its outstanding service, the unit was awarded two Republic of Korea Presidential Unit Citations and nine campaign honors. IX Corps fought hard and well in Korea. The unit was on the line the entire conflict and always inflicted more casualties on the enemy than she sustained. Examples of valor and sacrifice were numerous. An example of which is the Distinguished Service Cross won by IX Corps Commander Lieutenant General Reuben E. Jenkins at Chorwon. In 1954, the unit was ordered back to Japan. In 1956, it redeployed to Okinawa to become part of HQ, Ryukyu Islands. In 1961, the IX Corps became a Major Subordinate Command of U.S. Army Pacific (USARPAC). At that time it was an integral part of the Active Army's IX Corps, and participated in Command Post Exercises with the Corps for its Annual Training. The nature of these exercises in the 1960s was unique in that IX Corps now had a Reserve element in Hawaii and an active duty element in Okinawa. This made for excellent cooperation and coordination between the Army Reserve and the Active Army. The exercises were realistic. Southeast Asia Treaty Organization (SEATO) exercises in Thailand occurred as the Vietnam War was raging. IX Corps Soldiers had a better understanding of the nature of the Vietnam War before the rest of the Army. These exercises included the continuing Yama Sakura with Japan, Coral Sands in which IX Corps troops participated in an amphibious as-sault on Molokai with components of the Active Army and Navy, Trupenamt II, and Triad 81 with Australian and New Zealand Forces.

On April 27, 1987, the Command was re-designated IX Corps (Reinforcement). On October 1, 1995, the Command was renamed 9th U.S. Army Reserve Command following the inactivation of IX Corps, a month earlier at Camp Zama, Japan. The Command moved to its current location at Fort Shafter Flats from Fort DeRussy in December 1997.

The organization experienced several years of reorganization and restructure to establish a more relevant, ready, and indispensable USARPAC Reserve Force. As a result the Command was re-designated the 9th Regional Support Command on January 31, 1998, then re-designated as the 9th Regional Readiness Command on November 4, 2002 and again re-designated to its current organization as the 9th Mission Support Command (MSC) on April 16, 2008.

== Organization ==
The 9th Mission Support Command is a subordinate geographic command of the United States Army Reserve Command responsible for reserve units in Alaska and Hawaii, the territories of American Samoa, Guam, and Northern Mariana Islands, and the allied nations of Japan and South Korea. As of January 2026 the command consists of the following units:

- 9th Mission Support Command, at Fort Shafter (HI)
  - Headquarters and Headquarters Company, at Fort Shafter (HI)
  - Detachment 3, USAR Element — United States Indo-Pacific Command (INDOPACOM), at Camp H. M. Smith (HI)
  - Bravo Company, 301st Military Intelligence Battalion (Theater Support), at Fort Shafter (HI)
  - 25th Infantry Division Main Command Post — Operational Detachment (MCP-OD), at Schofield Barracks (HI)
  - 303rd Maneuver Enhancement Brigade, at Fort Shafter (HI)
    - Headquarters and Headquarters Company, at Fort Shafter (HI)
    - 411th Engineer Battalion, at Fort Shafter (HI)
      - Headquarters and Headquarters Company, 411th Engineer Battalion, at Fort Shafter (HI)
      - Forward Support Company, 411th Engineer Battalion, in Tafuna (American Samoa)
      - 297th Engineer Company (Engineer Construction Company — ECC), at Joint Base Elmendorf–Richardson (AK)
        - Detachment 1, 297th Engineer Company (Engineer Construction Company — ECC), at Fort Wainwright (AK)
      - 797th Engineer Company (Vertical Construction Company — VCC), in Barrigada (Guam)
      - 871st Engineer Company (Vertical Construction Company — VCC), in Hilo (HI)
    - 368th Military Police Company, in Barrigada (Guam)
    - 829th Brigade Signal Company (MEB/CAB/SB), at Fort Shafter (HI)
  - 322nd Civil Affairs Brigade, at Fort Shafter (HI)
    - Headquarters and Headquarters Company, at Fort Shafter (HI)
    - 100th Battalion / 442nd Infantry Regiment, at Fort Shafter (HI)
      - Headquarters and Headquarters Company, at Fort Shafter (HI)
        - Detachment 1, Headquarters and Headquarters Company, in Hilo (HI)
      - Bravo Company, 100th Infantry Battalion, in Tafuna (American Samoa)
      - Charlie Company, 100th Infantry Battalion, at Joint Base Lewis–McChord (WA)
      - Delta Company, 100th Infantry Battalion, at Fort Shafter (HI)
      - Echo Company, 100th Infantry Battalion, in Barrigada (Guam)
        - Detachment 1, Echo Company, 100th Infantry Battalion, in Tanapag (Saipan)
      - 740th Forward Support Company, at Fort Shafter (HI)
  - 658th Regional Support Group, at Yongsan Garrison (South Korea)
    - Headquarters and Headquarters Company, at Yongsan Garrison (South Korea)
    - 124th Chaplain Detachment, at Fort Shafter (HI)
    - 127th Chaplain Detachment, in Tafuna (American Samoa)
    - 302nd Transportation Battalion (Terminal), at Fort Shafter (HI)
      - Headquarters and Headquarters Detachment, 302nd Transportation Battalion (Terminal), at Fort Shafter (HI)
      - 302nd Quartermaster Company (Field Service) (Modular), in Barrigada (Guam)
        - Detachment 1, 302nd Quartermaster Company (Field Service) (Modular), in Tanapag (Saipan)
      - 962nd Quartermaster Company (Mortuary Affairs), at Fort Shafter (HI)
        - 1st Platoon, 962nd Quartermaster Company (Mortuary Affairs), at Joint Base Elmendorf–Richardson (AK)
        - 2nd Platoon, 962nd Quartermaster Company (Mortuary Affairs), in Tafuna (American Samoa)
        - 3rd Platoon, 962nd Quartermaster Company (Mortuary Affairs), in Barrigada (Guam)
  - 4960th Multifunctional Training Brigade, at Fort Shafter (HI)
    - Headquarters and Headquarters Company, at Fort Shafter (HI)
    - Detachment 3, 2nd Battalion, 413th Regiment, at Fort Shafter (HI)
  - 3rd Mobilization Support Group, at Joint Base Elmendorf–Richardson (AK)
    - 3301st Mobilization Support Battalion, at Joint Base Elmendorf–Richardson (AK)
    - 3302nd Mobilization Support Battalion, at Fort Shafter (HI)
    - 3303rd Mobilization Support Battalion, in Barrigada (Guam)
    - 3304th Mobilization Support Battalion, at Fort Shafter (HI)
    - 3305th Mobilization Support Battalion, at Fort Shafter (HI)
  - 1984th US Army Hospital, at Fort Wainwright (AK)
    - Detachment 1, 1984th US Army Hospital, at Joint Base Elmendorf–Richardson (AK)
    - Detachment 2, 1984th US Army Hospital, in Honolulu (HI)
    - Detachment 3, 1984th US Army Hospital, in Barrigada (Guam)
  - Pacific Support Unit, at Fort Shafter (HI)
    - Pacific Support Unit Detachment 1, at Camp Humphreys (South Korea)
    - Pacific Support Unit Detachment 2, at Camp Zama (Japan)
    - 30th Military History Detachment, at Fort Shafter (HI)
    - 305th Mobile Public Affairs Detachment, at Fort Shafter (HI)
  - USAR Theater Support Group, at Fort Shafter (HI)
    - Theater Support Group Detachment Oahu
    - Theater Support Group Detachment Alaska
    - Theater Support Group Detachment American Samoa
    - Theater Support Group Detachment Marianas
