= Army Service Component Command =

Command responsible for allocating forces

Army Service Component Commands (ASCCs) are U.S. Army commands responsible for recommendations to the Joint Force Commander on the allocation and employment of U.S. Army forces within a unified combatant command (CCMD) or further assigned to a subordinate unified command.

The concept of unified combatant commands grew out of the World War II formation of the Supreme Headquarters Allied Expeditionary Force (SHAEF), coordinating the strategy and operation of multiple service branches. As of 2024, the United States Department of Defense has established 11 of these CCMDs, composed of units from two or more service branches of the United States Armed Forces, and conducts broad and continuing missions. For any such CCMDs that include units of the U.S. Army, an ASCC is attached.

In addition, in the event that the overall combatant commander creates a subordinate unified command within their CCMD, the Department of the Army will form a matching Army component headquarters.

In matching, the secretary of the Army also has the authority to redirect service responsibilities outside of Army Service Command Component channels (to one of the other service branches attached to the subordinate CCMD). The Command itself may also redirect administrative responsibility outside Army forces. ASCCs also server administrative control for some of its functions, this is also typically true among Reserve Component forces. Shared administrative control also applies to direct reporting units of the Army that typically perform single or unique functions.

Four types of command authority can be distinguished:

1. COCOM - combatant command: unitary control (not further delegatable by the combatant commander CCDR)
2. ADCON - administrative control of the command function of "obtaining resources, direction for training, methods of morale and discipline"
3. OPCON - operational control of say, sustainment, a command function, in this case, embodied in an Army Field Support Brigade (AFSB)
4. TACON - tactical control of say, sustainment, as embodied in a Contracting Support Brigade

== The Theater Army ==
According to U.S. Army Doctrine, a theater army headquarters is the army service component command assigned to a geographic combatant command. It is organized, staffed, and equipped to perform 3 roles:

1. Theater army for the geographic combatant command
2. Joint task force headquarters (with augmentation) for limited contingency operations
3. Joint force land component headquarters (with augmentation) for limited contingency operations

A theater army is responsible for the administration and support of all United States Army forces assigned, attached, under the operational control of a geographic combatant command or transitioning to that area of responsibility (AOR). For example, United States Army Central (Formerly the Third United States Army) which is a theater army is responsible for the administration and support of all U.S. Army forces assigned, attached, under the operational control of United States Central Command, or transitioning into its area of responsibility. The theater army also provides most of the administrative control and army support to forces deployed in the joint operations area. In addition to these functions the theater army has a significant role in: coordinating, supporting, integrating all formations above brigade forces into geographic combatant command plans for that area of responsibility, and providing common-user logistics and Army executive agent services for all Army and joint forces operating in that AOR. The theater army is also responsible for distribution, recovery, and redistribution of supplies and equipment in joint operations areas. The theater army enables the combatant commander to employ across the scope of military operations.

Each theater army supports the Army strategic roles—prevent, shape, and win—and facilitates the use of landpower in JTFs

Theater Armies exercise operational control of all army forces under its command until the combatant commander attaches units to a subordinate joint command. The theater army retains administrative control of all army forces in the command regardless of whether the theater army has operational control over them; this responsibility extends to the entirety of the U.S. Army.

The theater army commander remains responsible to the Department of the Army for Service-specific requirements. This falls under the ADCON chain of authority

=== Theater Army in Army Service Component Command Role ===
Responsibilities of a Service component are determined from Title 10; DODD 5101.1; DA Memo 1-10; and combatant commander’s daily operational requirements.

These responsibilities may include:

- Executing combatant commander's daily operation requirements
- Setting the theater
- Setting the Joint Operations Area
- Serve as a Joint Task Force or Joint Force land Component Commander for immediate crisis response and limited, small-scale operations
- Recommend proper employment, task organization, and command relationship of Army forces to the Joint Force Commander (JFC)
- Integrate Army forces into the execution of theater engagement plans, and accomplish any operational missions assigned by the Joint Force Commander
- Select and nominate specific Army units for attachment to other subordinate commands
- Conduct joint training, including training of components of other Services for joint operations in which the Army is designated the lead service.
- Early in the planning process, inform the Joint Force Commander, other component or supporting commanders, and the combatant commander of planning for changes in logistic support that would affect operational capability or sustainability
- Develop program and budget requests that comply with combatant commander guidance on warfighting requirements and priorities.
- Inform the combatant commander of program and budget decisions that may affect joint operation planning.
- Provide AOR-wide contingency planning and coordination, develop and maintain operation and or contingency plans, update regionally focused intelligence estimates, and update Service supporting plans to the Combatant Commander theater campaign plan.
- Provide, as requested, supporting joint operation and exercise plans with necessary force data to support missions that may be assigned by the combatant commander.

Additionally, the theater army is also responsible for administrative control of all U.S. Army forces in that AOR during times of peace and war.

== Combatant Commands and their Army Service Component Commands ==
Example
Combatant Command	Army Service Component Command
U.S. Indo-Pacific Command	U.S. Army Pacific (theater army)
U.S. European Command	U.S. Army Europe-Africa (theater army)
U.S. Central Command	U.S. Army Central (theater army)
U.S. Africa Command	U.S. Army Europe-Africa (theater army)
U.S. Southern Command	U.S. Army South (theater army)
U.S. Northern Command	U.S. Army North (theater army)
U.S. Space Command	U.S. Army Space and Missile Defense Command
U.S. Strategic Command	U.S. Army Space and Missile Defense Command
U.S. Transportation Command	U.S. Army Transportation Command
U.S. Cyber Command	U.S. Army Cyber Command
U.S. Special Operations Command	U.S. Army Special Operations Command
