= 303rd Maneuver Enhancement Brigade =

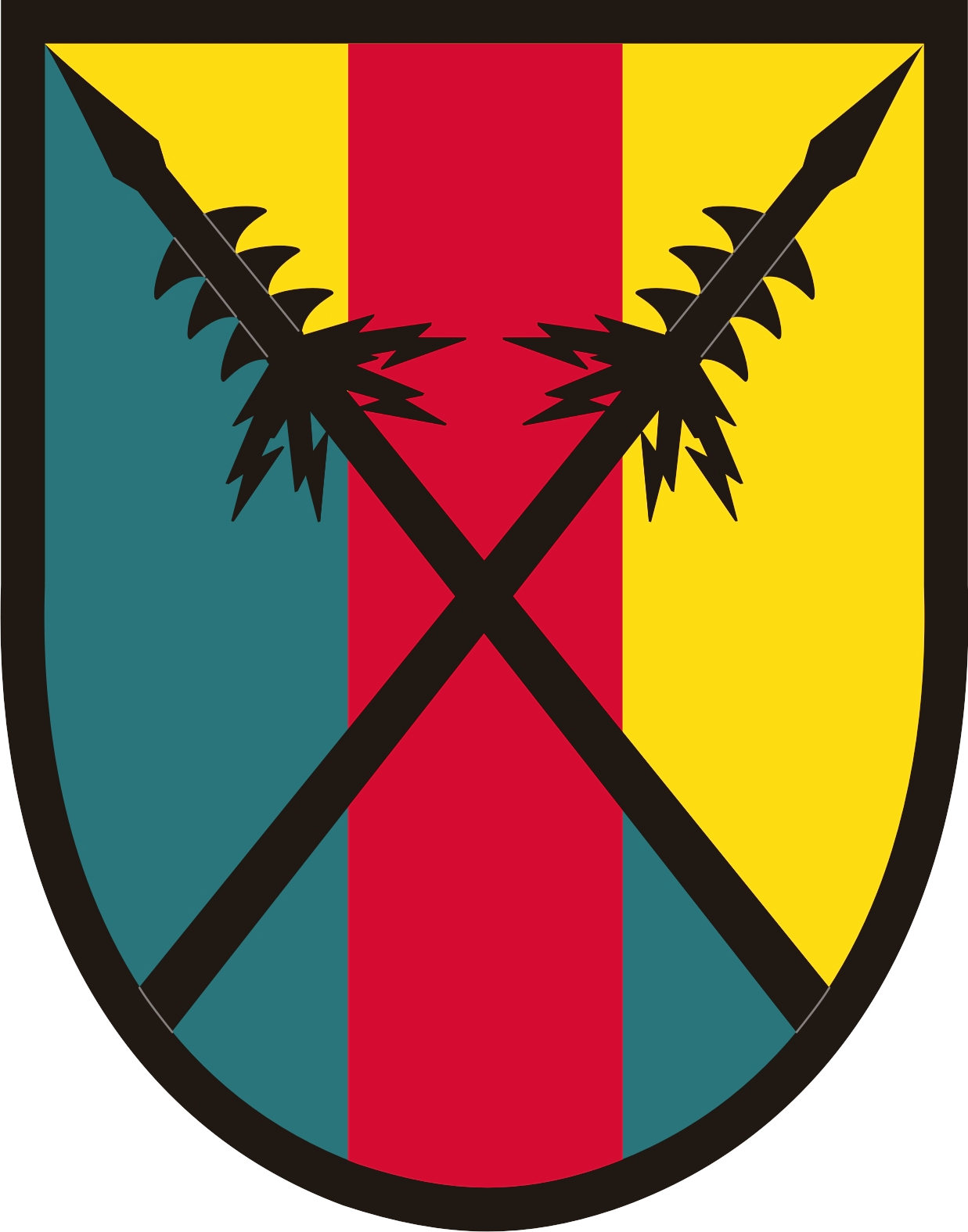
- Active: January 2011 - present
- Country: United States
- Branch: United States Army Reserve
- Type: Maneuver Enhancement
- Size: Brigade
- Part of: 9th Mission Support Command
- Garrison/HQ: Fort Shafter Flats, Honolulu Hawaii
- Motto: "Pahu Imua" (Push Forward)

Commanders
- Current commander: Col. Mary Durham

Insignia
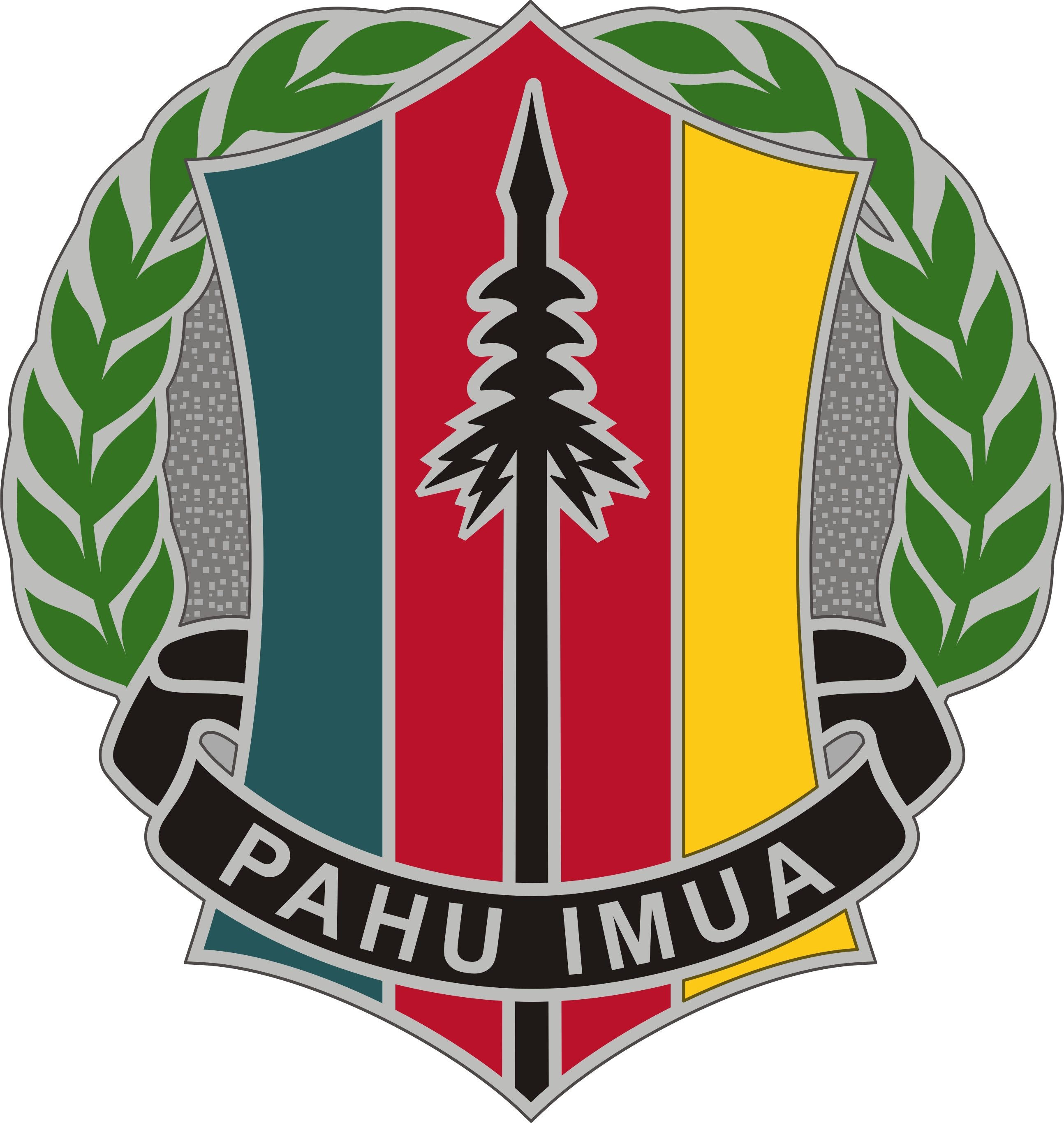
- 303rd Maneuver Enhancement Brigade DUI

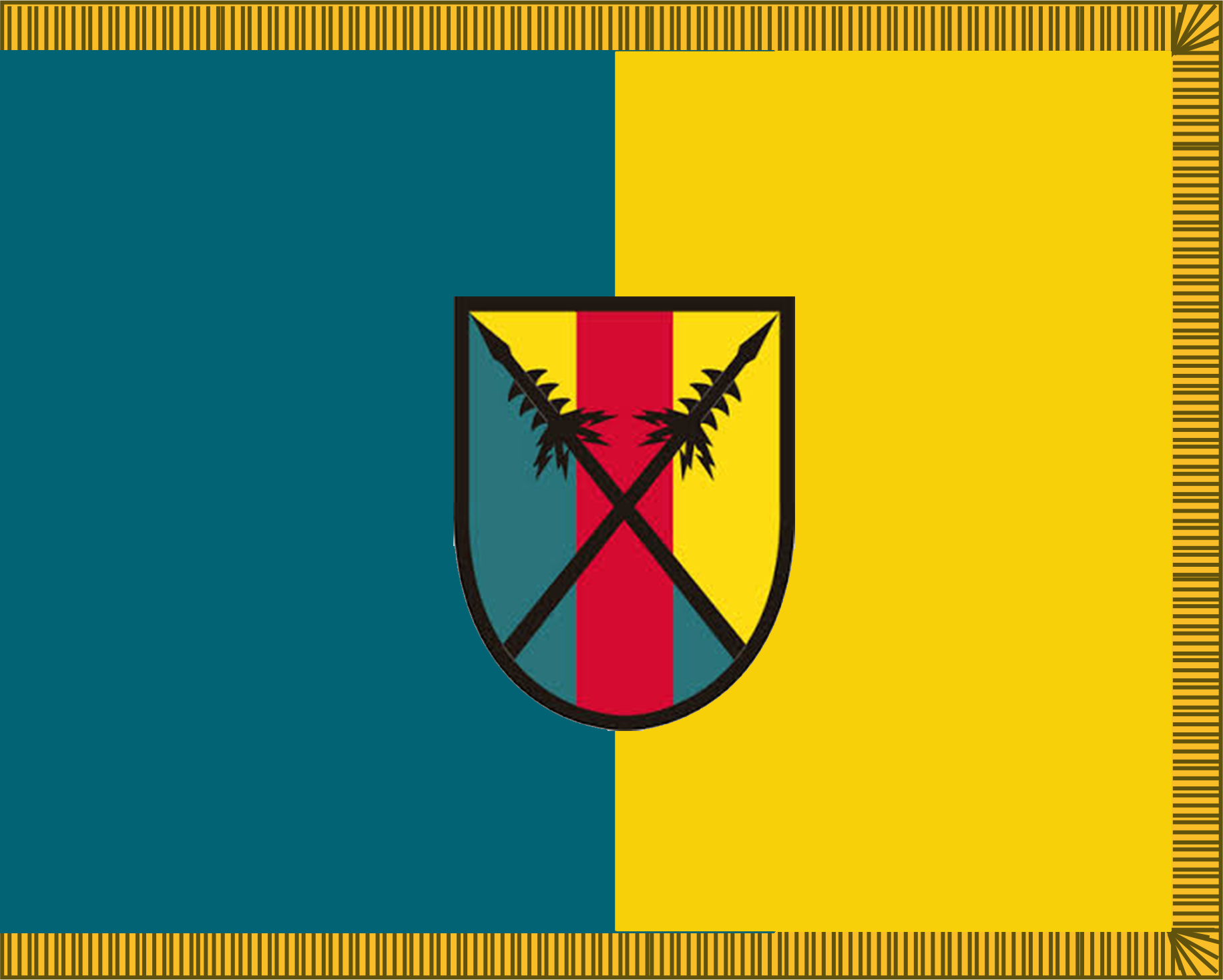
- 303rd Maneuver Enhancement Brigade Flag

9th Mission Support Command activated the 303rd Maneuver Enhancement Brigade at Fort Shafter Flats, Hawaii, on 22 January 2011. The mission of an MEB is to protect the rear area of a larger division.

== Organization ==
As of December 2025 the brigade consists of the following units:

- 303rd Maneuver Enhancement Brigade, at Fort Shafter (HI)
  - Headquarters and Headquarters Company, at Fort Shafter (HI)
  - 411th Engineer Battalion, at Fort Shafter (HI)
    - Headquarters and Headquarters Company, at Fort Shafter (HI)
    - 297th Engineer Company (Construction), at Joint Base Elmendorf–Richardson (AK)
      - Detachment 1, 297th Engineer Company (Construction), at Fort Wainwright (AK)
    - 797th Engineer Company (Vertical Construction), in Barrigada (Guam)
    - 871st Engineer Company (Vertical Construction), in Hilo (HI)
    - Forward Support Company, 411th Engineer Battalion, in Tafuna (American Samoa)
  - 368th Military Police Company, in Barrigada (Guam)
  - 829th Brigade Signal Company (MEB/CAB/SB), at Fort Shafter (HI)

== Insignia ==
The Shoulder Sleeve Insignia is a round bottom shield with a red vertical stripe in the center. The left and right stripes are divided diagonally between teal and gold. In the center are two crossed Hawaiian spears. The insignia was approved on 20 October 2010.

The Distinctive Unit Insignia is a silver pin with a six sided rounded pointed shield divided into three vertical sections teal, red and gold with a single Hawaiian spear in the center. Above it is a green laurel wreath and below is a black scroll with the motto "Pahu Imua" (Push Forward). The insignia was approved on 20 October 2010.
