= Fort Shafter =

US Army Pacific headquarters in Honolulu, Hawaii, US

- Honolulu, Hawaii
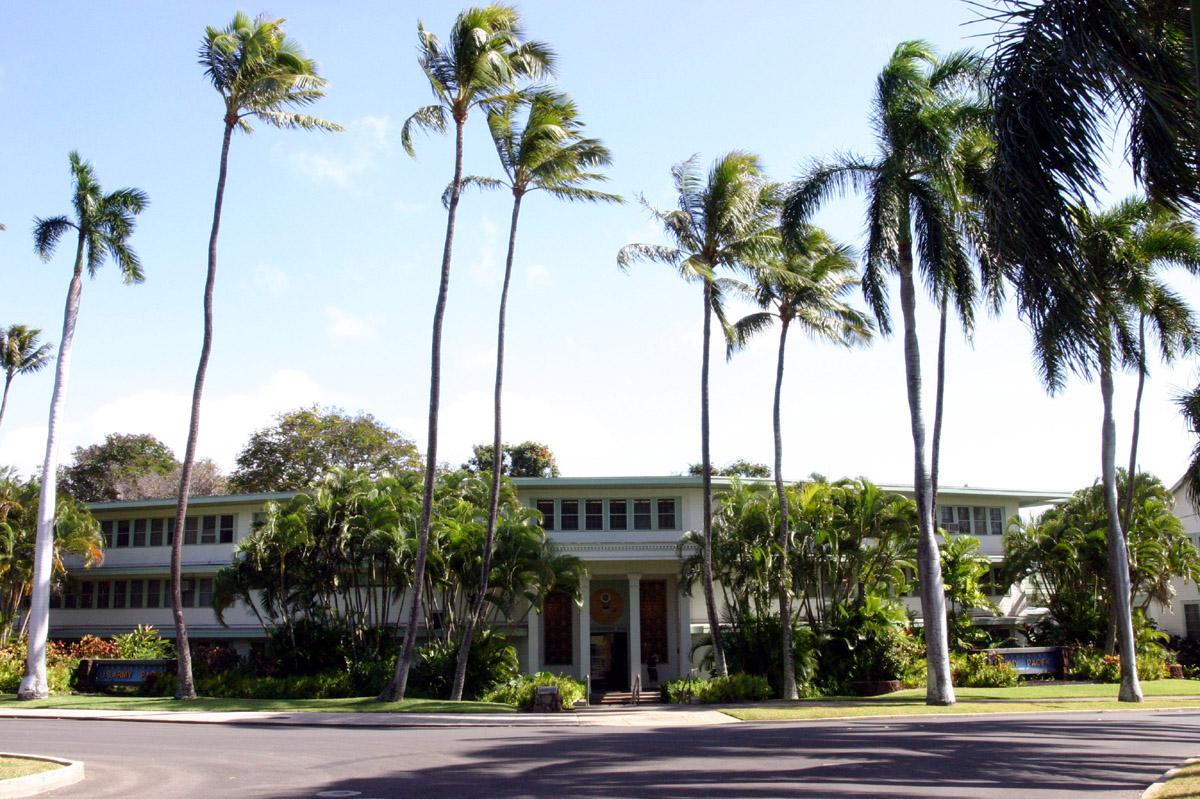
- Richardson Hall at Fort Shafter, nicknamed the "Pineapple Pentagon"

Site information
- Type: Army post
- Controlled by: U.S. Army

Location
- Coordinates: 21.345°N 157.884°W

Site history
- Built: 1905-1907
- In use: 1907 – present
- Battles/wars: Attack on Pearl Harbor

Garrison information
- Current commander: General Ronald P. Clark
- Past commanders: General Charles Flynn
- Garrison: U.S. Army Pacific

Fort Shafter is an army installation located in the City and County of Honolulu, Hawai‘i. It is the headquarters of the United States Army Pacific, which commands most Army forces in the Asia-Pacific region with the exception of Korea. Geographically, Fort Shafter extends up the interfluve (ridgeline) between Kalihi and Moanalua valleys, as well as onto the coastal plain (as Shafter Flats) at Māpunapuna. A portion of the area is also known as the Palm Circle Historic District; it is listed on the National Register of Historic Places and has been further designated as a U.S. National Historic Landmark. It is also known as Palm Circle or 100 Area.

It is located in the Urban Honolulu census-designated place.

== History ==
Fort Shafter is the oldest military base on Oahu and celebrated its 100th birthday on 22 June 2007.

Fort Shafter has been home to the senior Army headquarters in Hawaii for a century. Construction began in 1905 on the ahupua'a of Kahauiki, former Hawaiian crown lands that were illegally ceded to the United States government by the Republic of Hawai'i after annexation without consent from the original stewards, the Hawaiian Royal Family. When the post opened in 1907, it was named for Major General William Rufus Shafter (1835–1906), who led the United States expedition to Cuba in 1898.

Palm Circle was laid out as a cantonment for an infantry battalion. The barracks and officers' quarters were arranged around a parade field ringed by royal palms. The first unit stationed at the new post was the 2d Battalion, 20th Infantry Regiment.

Fort Shafter gradually spread out from Palm Circle. Tripler General Hospital once stood where the highway intersection is today (the hospital moved to its present location in 1948). In 1914, a regimental-sized cantonment area was constructed (near Richardson Theater). The Hawaiian Ordnance Depot was built in 1917 as a separate post (near today's post exchange). In 1921, the Hawaiian Department moved to Fort Shafter from downtown Honolulu. Finally, a new area was constructed in 1940 for Signal Corps elements.

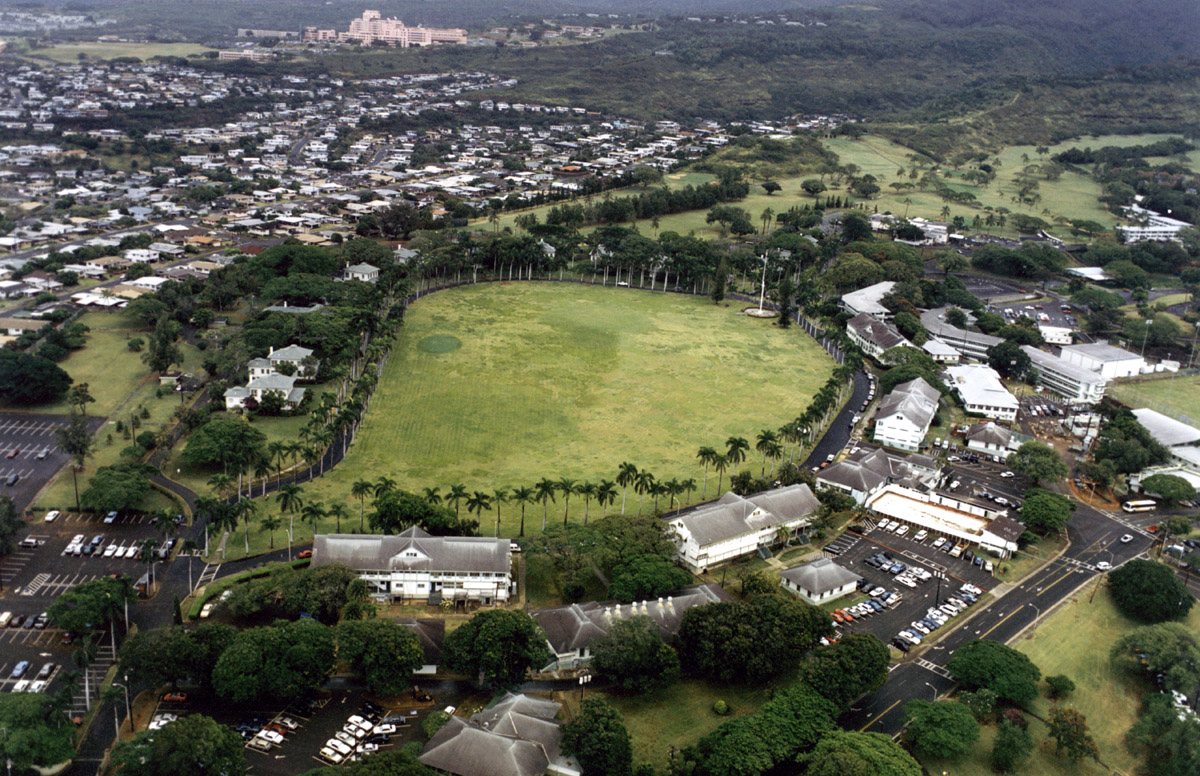
Palm Circle; Tripler Army Medical Center is visible in the background

War came to Fort Shafter on 7 December 1941, where the Hawaiian Department commander, Lieutenant General Walter C. Short, occupied Quarters 5. One soldier, Corporal Arthur A. Favreau, 64th Coast Artillery (Anti-Aircraft), was killed on post by an errant Navy shell. Fort Shafter became a busy headquarters and the barracks on Palm Circle were converted to offices. The major headquarters was named successively U.S. Army Forces, Central Pacific Area (1943–44); U.S. Army Forces, Pacific Ocean Areas (1944–45); and U.S. Army Forces, Middle Pacific (1945–47). In 1944, the Army Corps of Engineers erected the "Pineapple Pentagon" (buildings T-100, T-101, and T-102) in just 49 days. Two large fishponds were filled in to form Shafter Flats.

For most of the time since the Second World War, Fort Shafter has remained the senior Army headquarters for the Asia-Pacific region. In 1947, the headquarters was renamed U.S. Army, Pacific. The post continued to adapt to meet the Army's evolving requirements. In the early 1960s it was split in two by the new Moanalua Freeway. In 1974, when the headquarters was eliminated, Fort Shafter became home to U.S. Army Support Command, Hawaii, and the U.S. Army Corps of Engineers, Pacific Ocean Division (relocated from Fort Armstrong, (Hawaii)). In 1979, the Army established U.S. Army Western Command, which was renamed U.S. Army, Pacific in 1990. In 1983, the Army conveyed to the State of Hawaii 750 acres (3.0 km^{2}) of undeveloped land on the northern end of post. Today Fort Shafter remains the focal point for command, control, and support of Army forces in the Asia-Pacific region; it includes an underground command center beneath Palm Circle.

== Current Units ==
- United States Army Pacific
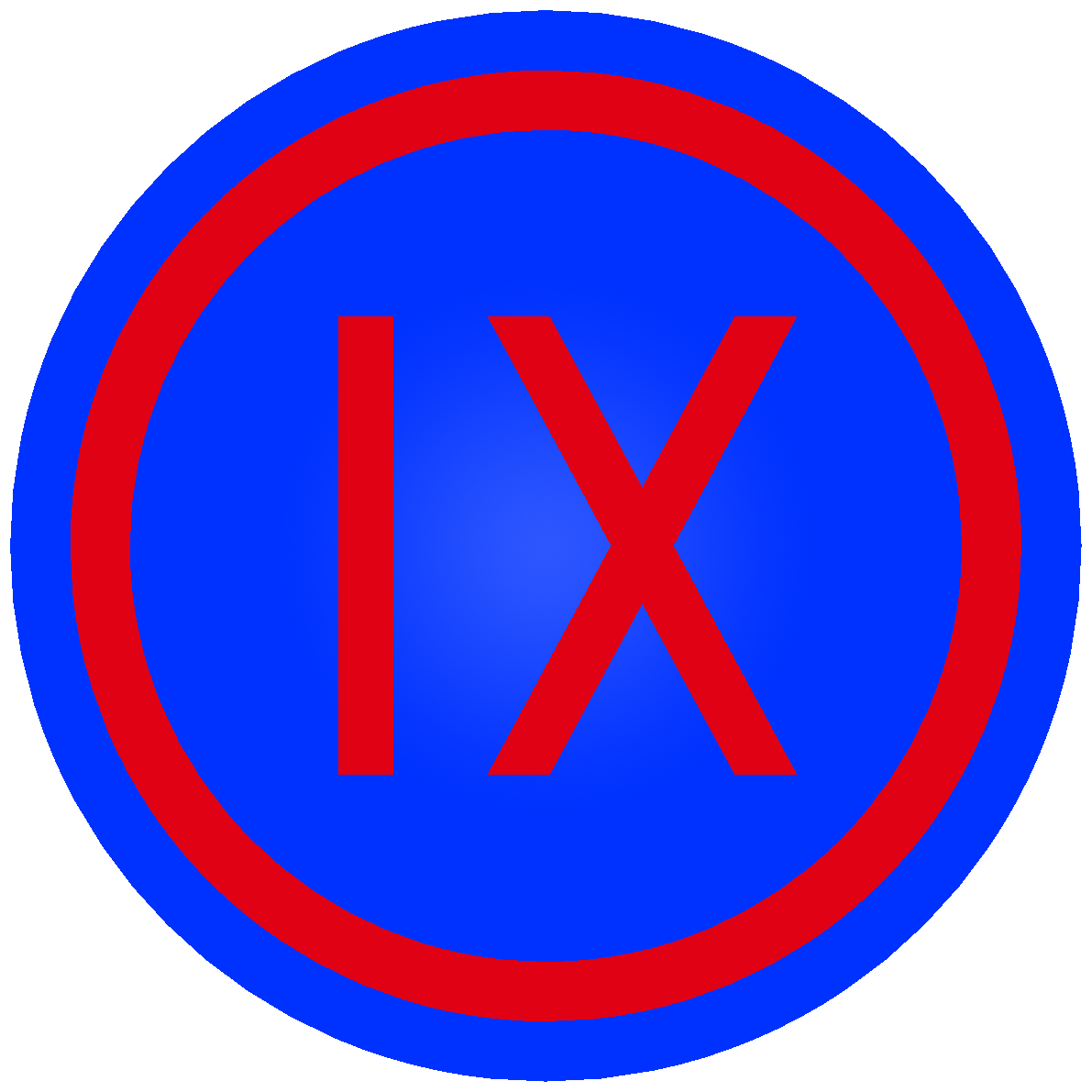
  - 9th Mission Support Command
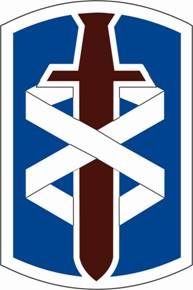
  - 18th Medical Command
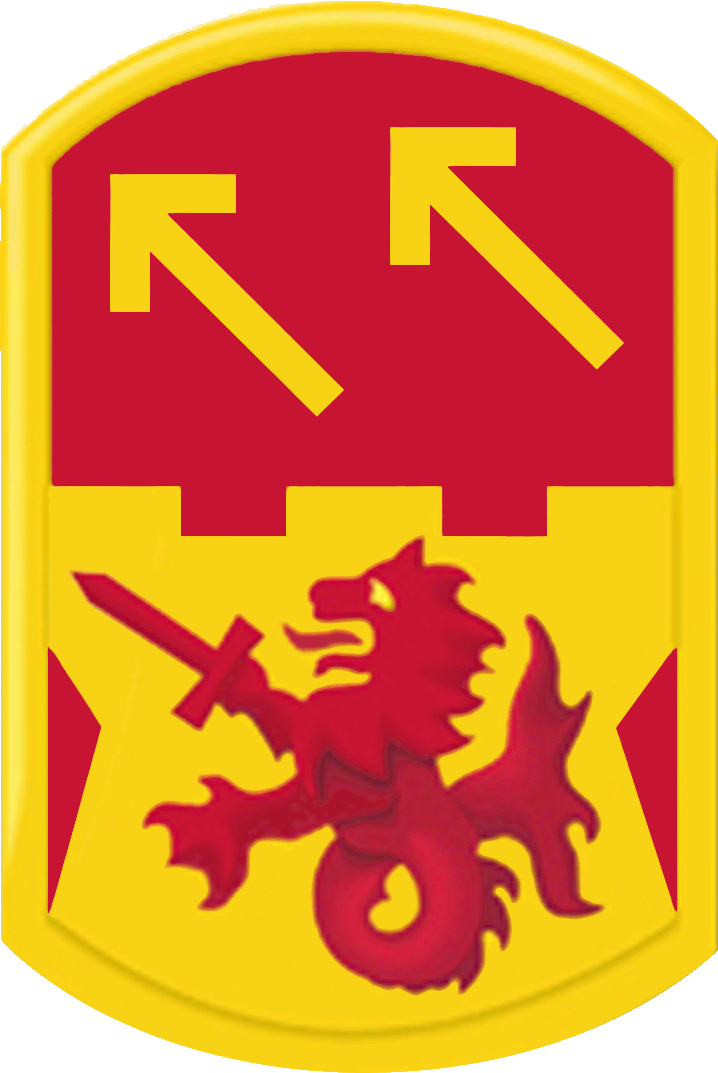
  - 94th Army Air and Missile Defense Command
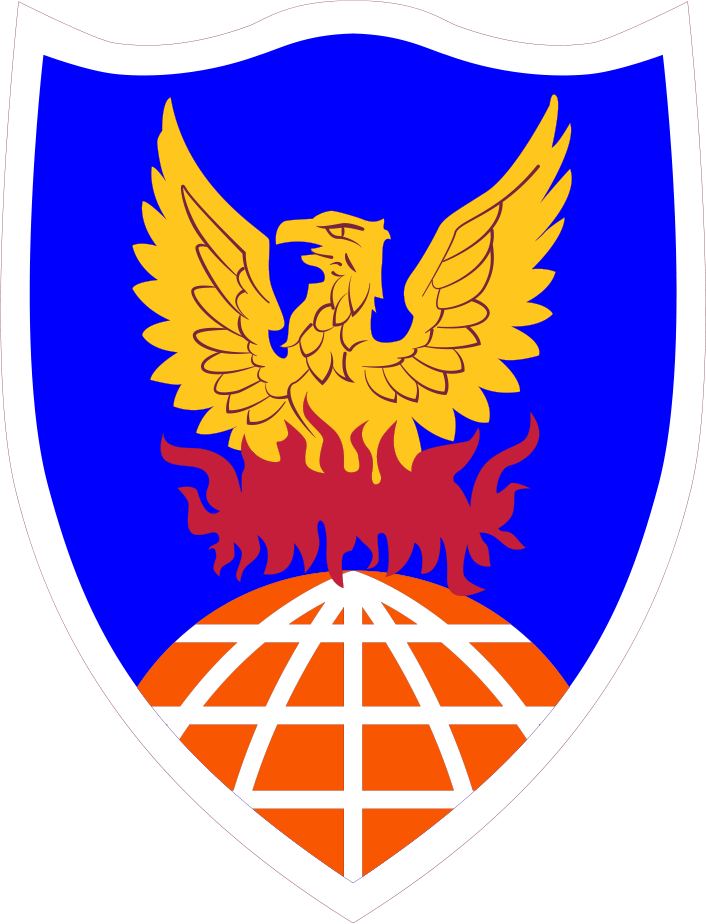
  - 311th Signal Command (Theater)
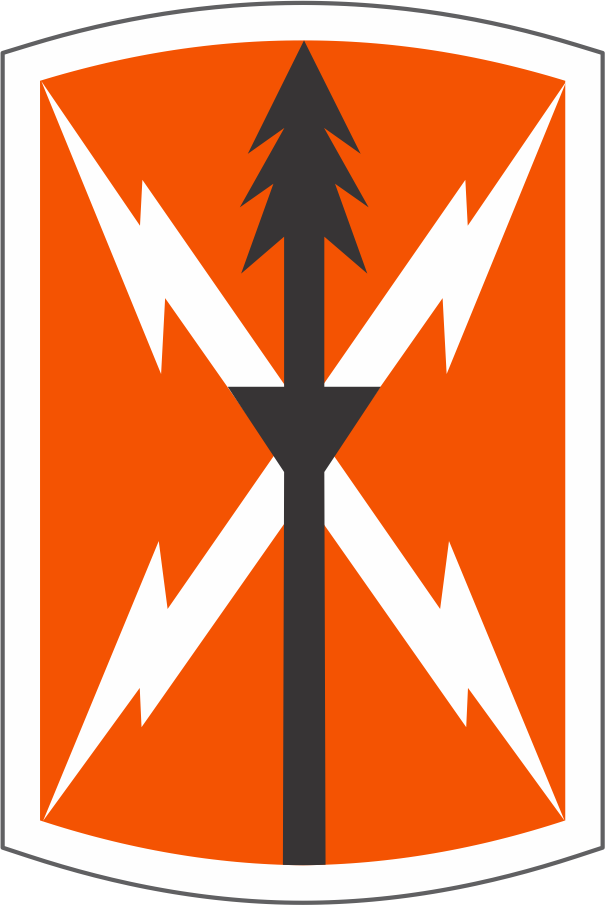
    - 516th Signal Brigade
  - 196th Infantry Brigade

== Education ==
Hawaii Department of Education operates public schools. As of 2016 zoned schools are Shafter Elementary School, Moanalua Middle School, and Moanalua High School.
