= Brown General Hospital =

Brown General Hospital was a military medical facility erected by the Union Army in Louisville, Kentucky, during the American Civil War. It was the largest of six general military hospitals scattered throughout the city. Army surgeons administered the hospital, aided by civilian agencies such as the United States Sanitary Commission and the U.S. Christian Commission.

The sprawling hospital was located near the Belknap campus of the University of Louisville, not far away from Fort McPherson. At times, especially in late 1864 through the end of the war, it housed more than a thousand patients. Conditions were often crowded, with insufficient medical staff (particularly surgeons and nurses) to fully treat the sick and wounded.

A large number of ill soldiers from the Atlanta campaign and other operations in the South were transported to Brown General Hospital for treatment; several died and were buried in a small cemetery adjoining the medical complex. Others were interred in Cave Hill Cemetery.

Brown became known as a leading regional center for the treatment of ophthalmic disorders, with Dr. Charles Porter Hart as chief eye surgeon.

English-born Major Blencowe E. Fryer was in charge of the facility from June 1863 until June 1865. Brown remained operational for more than a year after the war, when the army finally closed it and transferred the last remaining patients to other sites.

== See also ==
- List of former United States Army medical units
