= 118th General Hospital (United States Army) =

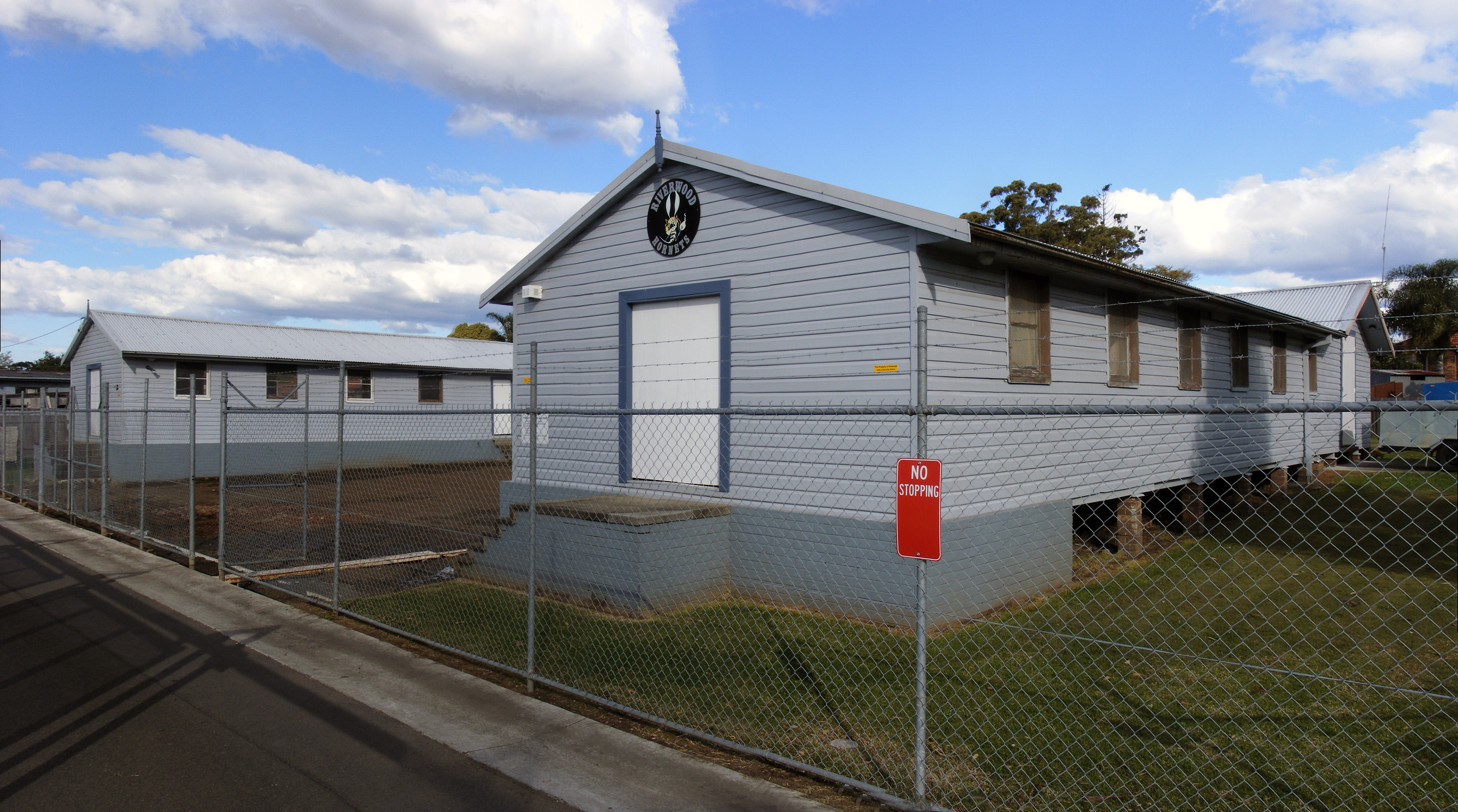
What remains of the 118th General Hospital

The 118th General Hospital was a U.S. Army military hospital built in 1942 at Riverwood, New South Wales. This was the largest military hospital in Australia, during World War II.

Known as the 118 General Hospital it was planned as a hospital centre of five hospitals consisting of 490 timber barracks-type buildings, which could house a total of 4,250 beds and accommodate up to 1,250 patients and 3,500 staff.

The hospital was formed by doctors and nurses from the Johns Hopkins University Hospital in Baltimore, Maryland. The hospital staff arrived in Sydney during June 1942 and ran a 400-bed hospital from August 1942, with a section at the Hydro Majestic Hotel at Medlow Bath.

Mrs Eleanor Roosevelt, wife of the US President Franklin D. Roosevelt, visited the 118 General Hospital on September 8th, 1943.

The U.S. Army vacated the hospital in 1945 and the Royal Navy occupied many of the buildings in January 1945 and the Australian Army used the remainder of the other buildings.

After World War II the site passed to the New South Wales Housing Commission from March 1946 and the huts were used to ease the post-war housing shortage.

Many streets in Riverwood remain named after U.S. places, such as Kentucky Road, Michigan Road, Roosevelt Avenue, and Washington Avenue.

== See also ==
- List of former United States Army medical units
