= Depot Field Hospital =

American Civil War hospital at City Point, Virginia

Coordinates: 37°18.95′N 77°16.656′W

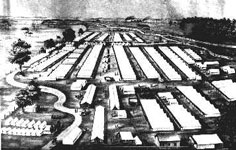
Depot Field Hospital

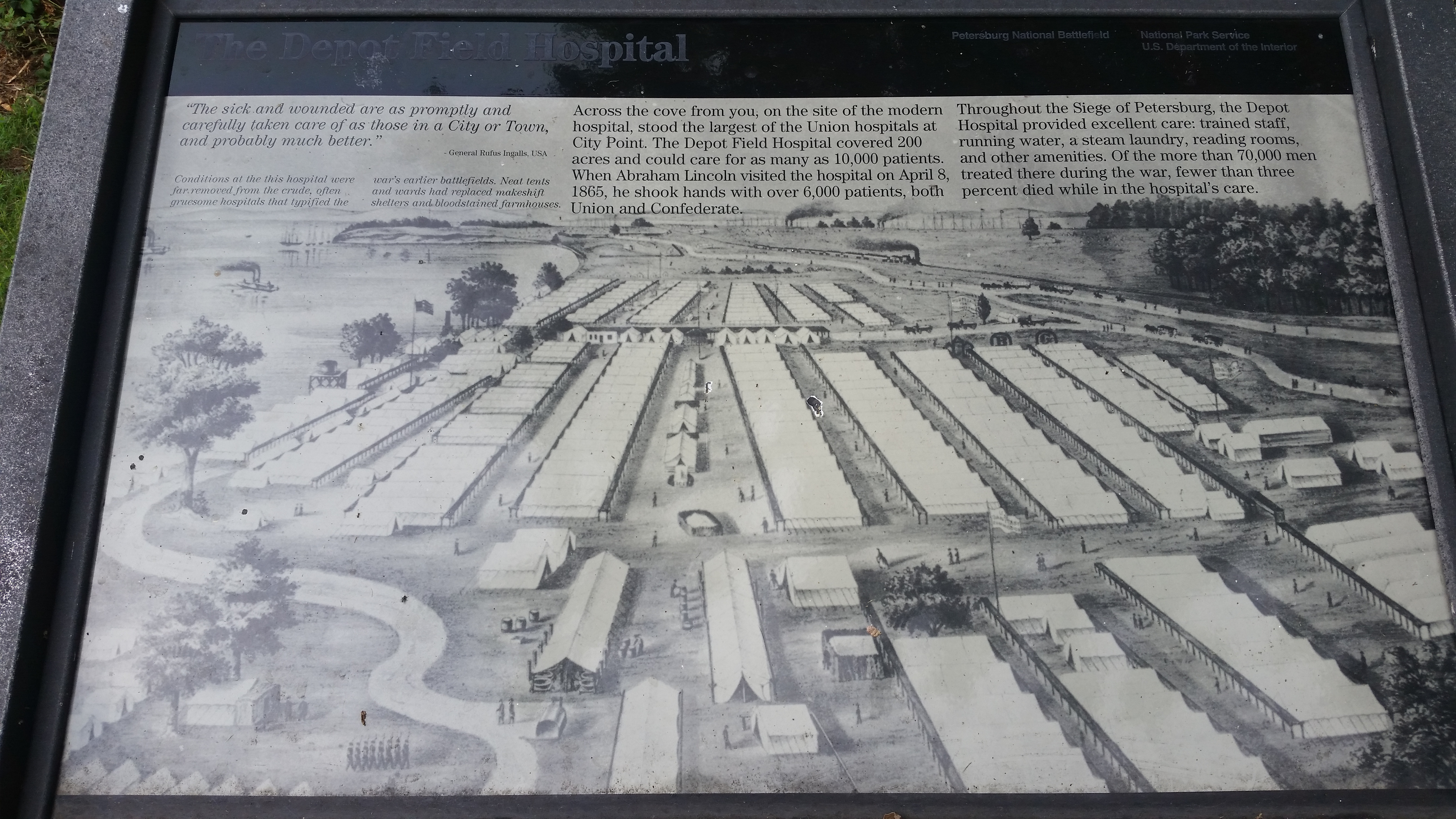
National Park Service marker for the Depot Field Hospital at City Point

Depot Field Hospital was one of seven hospitals operated at City Point, Virginia, in the Siege of Petersburg during the American Civil War.

The largest, Depot Field Hospital, covered nearly 200 acres (800,000 m^{2}) and could hold up to 10,000 patients. The compound comprised 1,200 tents, along with 90 log barracks in the winter, and laundries, dispensaries, regular and special diet kitchens, dining halls, offices, and other structures.

U.S. Army. Depot Field Hospital, City Point, Va: Front row of Wards, Hospital of 2nd Corps

Army surgeons administered the hospital and received support from civilian agencies, such as the United States Sanitary Commission and the U.S. Christian Commission. Male nurses serving in the U.S. Army cared for patients, providing them with their own beds and wash basins, along with fresh pillows and linens.

The National Park Service claims the "excellence" of the facilities and the "efficiency and dedication" of the staff helped Depot Field Hospital become one of the "finest" in the U.S.

President Abraham Lincoln visited the facility on April 8, 1865, where he is reported to have shook hands with more than 6,000 Union and Confederate patients.

Depot Field Hospital treated more than 70,000 soldiers during the Civil War, and the hospital reported deaths among fewer than 3 percent of those patients.

== See also ==
- List of former United States Army medical units
