= List of former United States Army medical units =

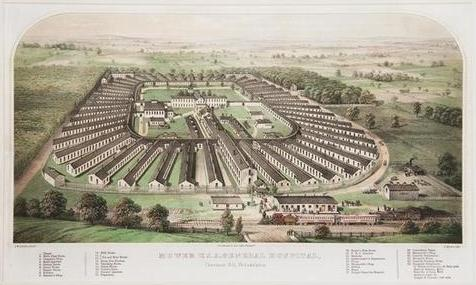
Mower Army General Hospital, Philadelphia, in an 1863 lithograph. Note passenger train in foreground.

The following is a list of former (inactivated or decommissioned) U.S. Army medical units – both fixed and deployable – with dates of inactivations, demobilizations, or redesignations.

== Named hospitals ==
=== Civil War era ===
Note: an asterisk (*) denotes a civilian hospital temporarily commandeered by the Union Army.

- Baxter General Hospital, Burlington, Vermont (1865)
- Brown General Hospital
- Freedman's Hospital
- Camp Letterman, an extensive field hospital used to treat the wounded after the Battle of Gettysburg, 1863
- McDougall Hospital, Westchester, New York (state) (1862). (The location is now within The Bronx, New York City).
- Mower Hospital (1865)
- Satterlee Hospital (1865)
- Sloan General Hospital, Montpelier, Vermont (1865)
- Smith General Hospital, Brattleboro, Vermont (1865)
- Indianapolis City Hospital*
- Yale – New Haven Hospital* (as the "Knight United States Army General Hospital")
- York United States Army Hospital

=== World War I ===
- Rockefeller War Demonstration Hospital (Also known as United States Army Auxiliary Hospital No. 1.), 5 April 1919
- United States Army General Hospital, Fort Bayard, New Mexico, Transferred to United States Public Health Service, 1920

=== World War II ===
- Army & Navy General Hospital Annex (1946) Eastman Hotel, Hot Springs, Arkansas
- Ashburn General Hospital, McKinney, Texas, Transferred to the Veterans Administration, 12 December 1945. Named for Colonel Percy Moreau Ashburn, first Commandant of the Medical Field Service School.

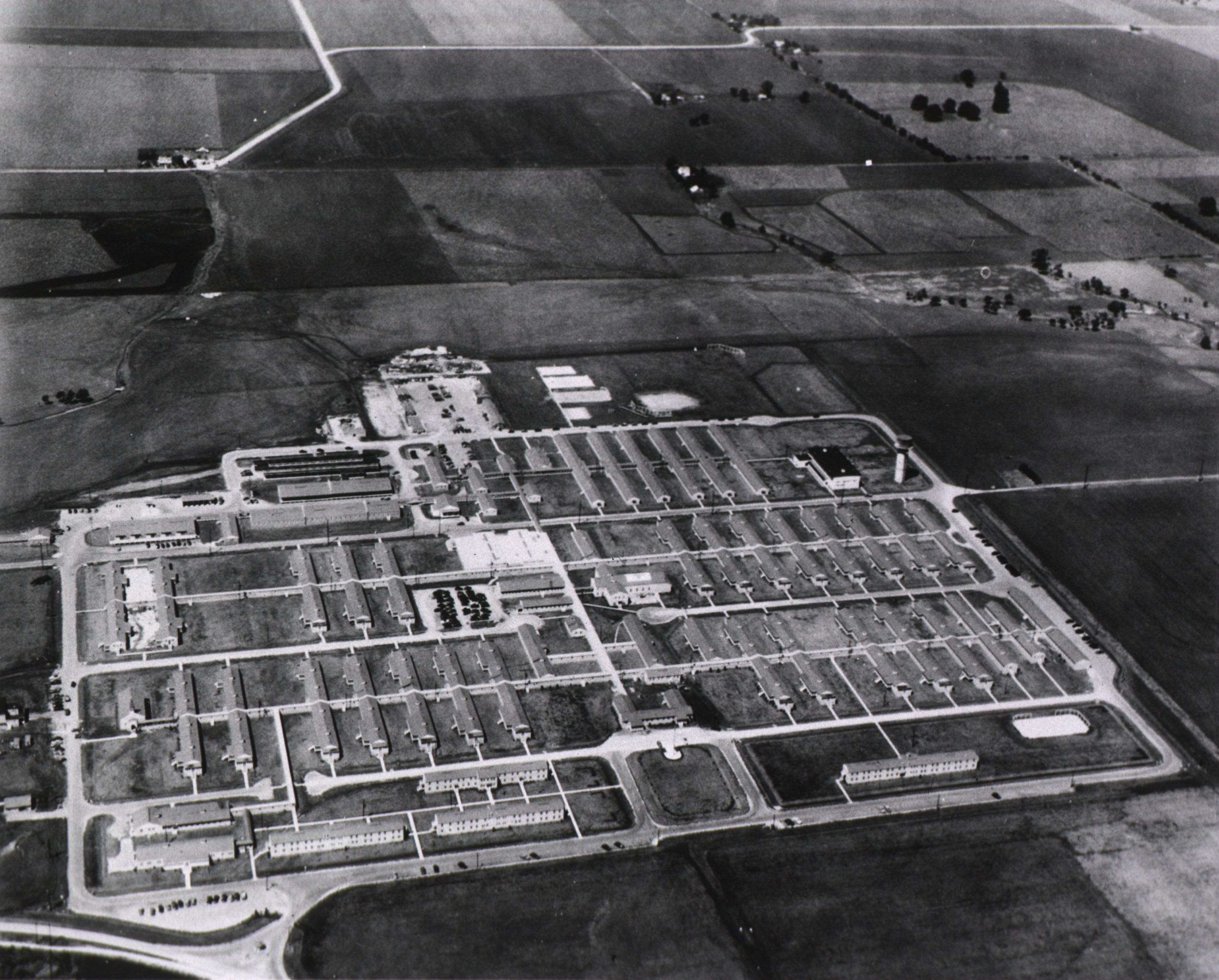
U.S. Army, Ashburn General Hospital, McKinney, TX: Aerial view, circa 1943

- Ashford General Hospital, operating in the Greenbrier Hotel, White Sulfur Springs, West Virginia. Named after Colonel Bailey K. Ashford, Medical Corps, United States Army. The hospital closed on 30 June 1946 and was repurchased by the C&O Railroad, the original owners.
- Birmingham General Hospital, Van Nuys, California, closed and transferred to the Veterans Administration 31 March 1946. Named for Brigadier General Henry Patrick Birmingham, Medical Corps, United States Army.
- Darnall General Hospital, operating in the former Kentucky State Hospital. Not to be confused with the current Carl R. Darnall Army Medical Center at Fort Hood, Texas, later named after the same individual.
- Churchill Hospital (1945)
- Deshon General Hospital, in the former Butler Hospital
- DeWitt General Hospital, Auburn, California, 31 December 1945. Named for Brigadier General Calvin DeWitt, Medical Corps, United States Army.
- Dibble General Hospital, Palo Alto, California, 31 July 1946. Named for Colonel John Dibble, Medical Corps, United States Army.
- England General Hospital, Atlantic City, New Jersey. Operated in the former Haddon Hall, Cedarcraft Hotel, Colton-Manor Hotel, Dennis Hotel, Keystone Hotel, New England Hotel, Rydal Hotel, Traymore Hotel, Warwick Hotel, and Chalfone Hotel, 30 June 1946.
- Gardiner General Hospital, Chicago Beach Hotel, Chicago, Illinois
- Halloran General Hospital, Staten Island, NYC (1942-1947); named after Col. Paul Stacey Halloran; constructed as the Willowbrook State School but taken by the federal government before opening; returned to the state of New York in 1947
- Hammond General Hospital, Modesto, California, December, 1945. Named for Surgeon General of the Union Army during the American Civil War
- Hoff General Hospital, Santa Barbara, California, named for Colonel John van Rennselaer Hoff, Medical Corps
- Hoff General Hospital Annex, Jefferson School, Santa Barbara, California
- Malinta Tunnel General Hospital, Corregidor Island, Philippines, 6 May 1942
- Mason General Hospital, Long Island, New York (1944–1946; psychiatric facility; the film Let There Be Light was made there.)
- McCloskey General Hospital, Temple, Texas, 31 March 1946. Named in honor of Major James A. McCloskey, Medical Corps, United States Army, killed in action at Bataan on 26 March 1942. He was the first Regular Army Medical Corps officer Killed in Action in World War II.
- Oliver General Hospital, Forest Hills Hotel
- Ream General Hospital, Breakers Hotel
- Rhoads General Hospital, Utica, New York (1946) Named after Colonel Thomas Leidy Rhoads, a career Army surgeon.
- Rhoads General Hospital Annex, Marcy NYA Facility, Utica, New York (1946)
- Sternberg General Hospital, Manila, Philippines, January 1942
- Torney General Hospital, El Mirador Hotel November, 1945. Named for Brigadier General George Henry Torney, former Surgeon General of the Army
- Wakeman General and Convalescent Hospital, Camp Atterbury, Edinburgh, Indiana, December 1946. Named in honor of Colonel Frank B. Wakeman, Medical Corps, United States Army. At the time of his death in March, 1944, Colonel Wakeman was serving as chief of the Training Division, Office of the Surgeon General, Washington, D. C.

=== Later ===
- Cutler Army Community Hospital, Fort Devens, Massachusetts (1995)
- DeWitt Army Community Hospital, Fort Belvoir, Virginia. (2011) Named for Colonel Ogden Dewitt, former Chief of Surgery, Walter Reed General Hospital.
- Army-Navy Hospital Hot Springs, Arkansas (1952)
- Fitzsimons Army Medical Center, Aurora, Colorado, 1999

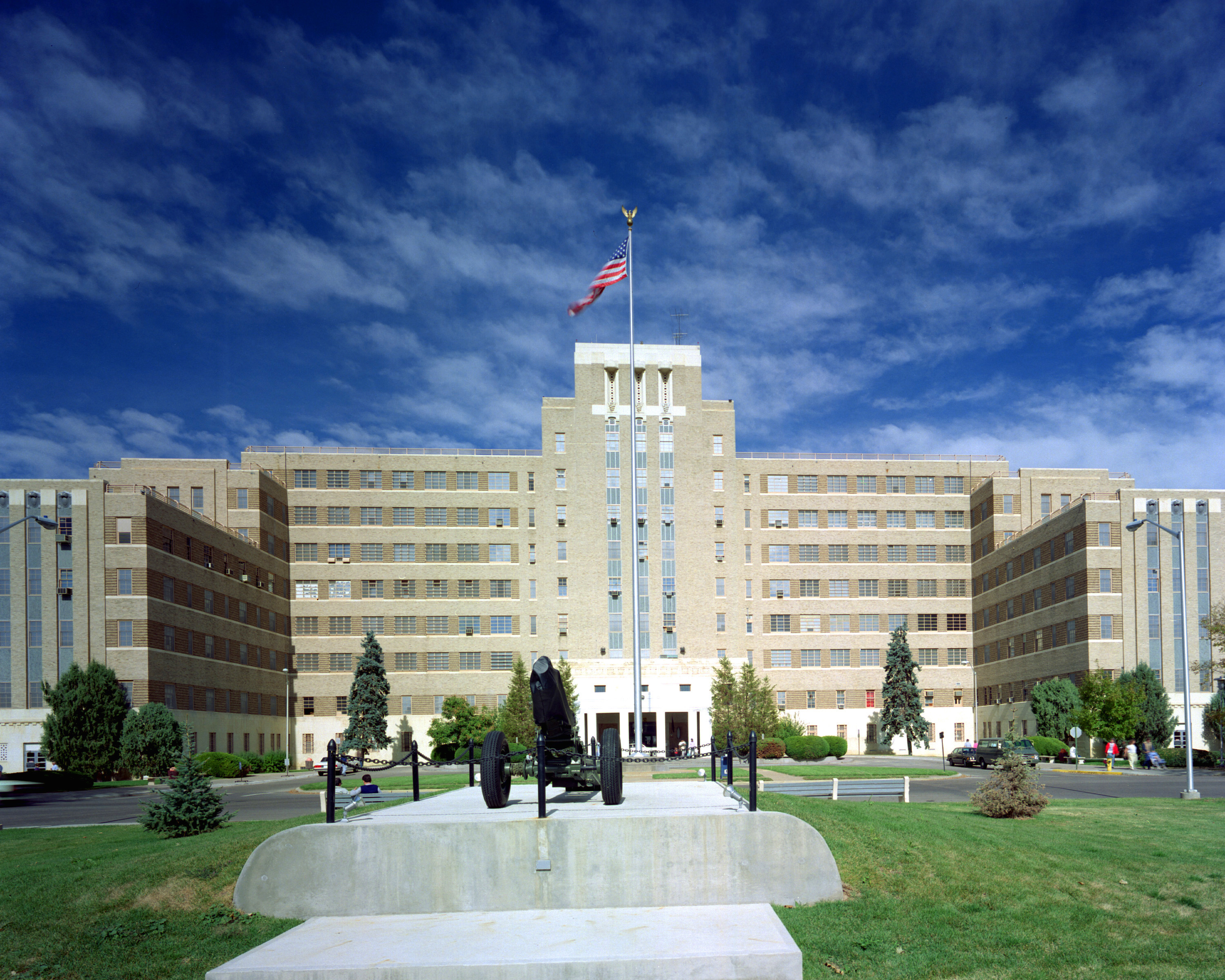
Fitzsimons Army Medical Center in 1989

- Frankfurt Army Regional Medical Center (1995)
- Gorgas Army Hospital, Canal Zone (1997)
- Hawley Army Hospital, Fort Benjamin Harrison, Indiana, 30 September 1995
- Letterman Army Medical Center, Presidio of San Francisco, California, 1994
- McCornack General Hospital, Pasadena, California (1949). Named for Brigadier Condon C. McCornack, Medical Corps, United States Army
- Noble Army Hospital, Fort McClellan, Closed with the base as part of the Base Realignment and Closure (BRAC) (1999).
- Percy Jones Army Hospital, Battle Creek, Michigan (1954)
- Silas B. Hays Army Community Hospital, Fort Ord, California (1995)
- Valley Forge General Hospital, Phoenixville, Pennsylvania, 31 March 1974
- Walson Army Hospital, Fort Dix, New Jersey (1960-1992). Transferred to the Air Force as part of Fort Dix BRAC action
- Walter Reed Army Medical Center, Washington, D.C., 27 August 2011
- Walter Reed General Hospital Annex, on the campus of the former National Park College. (1942-1974) Although the Army still retains portions of the property as the Forest Glen Annex of Fort Detrick, Maryland, all on-site patient care operations ceased when the Heaton Pavilion (Building 2) on the Main Campus at Walter Reed Army Medical Center opened for patient care in 1974.
- Fort Belvoir Community Hospital, reorganized and redesignated as the Alexander T. Augusta Military Medical Center on 19 May 2023 in honor of Brevet Lieutenant Colonel Alexander T. Augusta, the first African-American Medical Corps officer to serve in the United States Army, during the U.S. Civil War.

== Deployable hospitals ==
Civil War

- Depot Field Hospital (186?), City Point, Virginia

== Numbered general hospitals ==
=== World War I ===
- U.S. Army General Hospital No. 1, Williamsbridge, New York City (This location, Columbia Oval, is now within the Norwood, not Williamsbridge neighborhood of the Bronx.) This hospital was previously Columbia University's Columbia War Hospital. Closed in October 1919
- U.S. Army General Hospital No. 2, Fort McHenry, Maryland, December 1919
- U.S. Army General Hospital No. 3, Colonia, New Jersey, October 1919
- U.S. Army General Hospital No. 4, Fort Porter, New York, October 1919
- U.S. Army General Hospital No. 5, Fort Ontario, New York
- U.S. Army General Hospital No. 6, Fort McPherson, Georgia, December 1919
- U.S. Army General Hospital No. 7, Roland Park, Maryland, December 1919
- U.S. Army General Hospital No. 8, Otisville, New York, December 1919
- U.S. Army General Hospital No. 9, Lakewood, New Jersey, May 1919
- U.S. Army General Hospital No. 10, Boston, Massachusetts, June 1919
- U.S. Army General Hospital No. 11, Cape May, New Jersey, August 1919
- U.S. Army General Hospital No. 12, Biltmore, North Carolina, August 1919
- U.S. Army General Hospital No. 13, Dansville, New York, March 1919
- U.S. Army General Hospital No. 14, Fort Oglethorpe, Georgia, June 1919
- U.S. Army General Hospital No. 15, Corpus Christi, Texas, May 1919
- U.S. Army General Hospital No. 16, New Haven Connecticut, August 1919
- U.S. Army General Hospital No. 17, Markleton, Pennsylvania, March 1919
- U.S. Army General Hospital No. 18, Waynesville, North Carolina, March 1919
- U.S. Army General Hospital No. 19, Azalea, North Carolina, December 1919
- U.S. Army General Hospital No. 20, Whipple Barracks, Arizona, December 1919
- U.S. Army General Hospital No. 21, retained as Fitzsimmons General Hospital
- U.S. Army General Hospital No. 22, Philadelphia, Pennsylvania, June 1919
- U.S. Army General Hospital No. 23, Hot Springs, North Carolina, March 1919
- U.S. Army General Hospital No. 24, Park View, Pennsylvania, July 1919
- U.S. Army General Hospital No. 25, Fort Benjamin Harrison, Indiana, August 1919
- U.S. Army General Hospital No. 26, Fort Des Moines, Iowa, October, 1919
- U.S. Army General Hospital No. 27, Fort Douglas, Utah, October 1919
- U.S. Army General Hospital No. 28, Fort Sheridan, Illinois, December 1919
- U.S. Army General Hospital No. 29, Fort Snelling, Minnesota, August 1919
- U.S. Army General Hospital No. 30, Plattsburg Barracks, New York, October 1919
- U.S. Army General Hospital No. 31, Carlisle Barracks, Pennsylvania, December, 1919
- U.S. Army General Hospital No. 32, Chicago, Illinois, June 1919
- U.S. Army General Hospital No. 33, Fort Logan H. Roots, Arkansas, June 1919
- U.S. Army General Hospital No. 34, East Norfolk, Massachusetts, January 1919
- U.S. Army General Hospital No. 35, West Baden, Indiana, April 1919
- U.S. Army General Hospital No. 36, Detroit, Michigan, July 1919
- U.S. Army General Hospital No. 37, Madison Barracks, New York, March 1919
- U.S. Army General Hospital No. 38, East View, New York, March 1919
- U.S. Army General Hospital No. 39, Long Beach, New York, March 1919
- U.S. Army General Hospital No. 40, St. Louis, Missouri, June 1919
- U.S. Army General Hospital No. 41, Fox Hills, Staten Island, New York, December 1919
- U.S. Army General Hospital No. 42, Spartanburg, South Carolina, September 1919
- U.S. Army General Hospital No. 43, Hampton, Virginia, March 1920

=== World War II and later ===
- 1st General Hospital, end of World War II
- General Hospital No. 1, Limay, Philippines, April 1942
- 2nd General Hospital
  - United States, 12 October 1945
  - Landstuhl, Germany mid-1990s
- General Hospital No. 2, Cabcaben, Philippines, April 1942
- 3rd General Hospital, Camp Kilmer, New Jersey, 16 September 1945
- 4th General Hospital, end of World War II
- 5th General Hospital
  - end of World War II
  - Bad Cannstatt, Germany (~1990?)
- 6th General Hospital, 15 September 1945 at Leghorn, Italy
- 7th General Hospital, end of World War II
- 8th General Hospital, end of World War II
- 9th General Hospital, end of World War II
- 12th General Hospital, Italy, 15 September 1945
- 13th General Hospital, end of World War II
- 15th General Hospital, end of World War II
- 16th General Hospital
  - Camp Myles Standish, Massachusetts, 20 November 1945
  - Redesignated as the 325th General Hospital, 22 April 1947
- 17th General Hospital, Italy, 25 October 1945
- 18th General Hospital, Burma, 5 October 1945
- 19th General Hospital, end of World War II
- 20th General Hospital, end of World War II
- 21st General Hospital, Camp Miles Standish, Massachusetts, November 1945
- 22nd General Hospital, end of World War II
- 23rd General Hospital, Fort Dix, New Jersey, November 1945
- 25th General Hospital, Camp Shanks, New York, 20 November 1945
- 26th General Hospital, 14 September 1945 in Italy
- 27th General Hospital, end of World War II
- 28th General Hospital
  - Camp d’Orléans, France, 26 September 1945
  - Osaka, Japan
  - Croix-Chapeau, France, 1966
- 29th General Hospital, end of World War II
- 30th General Hospital, end of World War II
- 31st General Hospital, end of World War II
- 32nd General Hospital, end of World War II
- 33rd General Hospital, Livorno, Italy, 20 September 1945
- 34th General Hospital, New York, August 1945
- 35th General Hospital
  - Philippine Islands, 10 December 1945
  - Redesignated 23 May 1947 as the 328th General Hospital
- 36th General Hospital, end of World War II
- 37th General Hospital, Italy, 25 October 1945
- 38th General Hospital, Italy, redesignated 384th Station Hospital, 1 January 1946
- 39th General Hospital (1943-1944), Auckland, New Zealand. Later Cornwall Hospital
- 40th General Hospital, end of World War II
- 41st General Hospital, Italy, redesignated 359th Station Hospital 25 November 1943
- 42nd General Hospital, disbanded 11 November 1944
- 43rd General Hospital, end of World War II
- 44th General Hospital, end of World War II
- 45th General Hospital, Bari, Italy, 30 September 1945
- 46th General Hospital, end of World War II
- 47th General Hospital, end of World War II
- 48th General Hospital, end of World War II
- 49th General Hospital, end of World War II
- 50th General Hospital, Camp Kilmer, New Jersey, 27 October 1945
- 51st General Hospital, end of World War II
- 52nd General Hospital, United Kingdom, 24 August 1945
- 53rd General Hospital, end of World War II
- 54th General Hospital, Tokyo, Japan, 10 December 1945
- 55th General Hospital (1945) Formed 1943 at Ft Smith, AR. Deployed to England and France.
- 56th General Hospital, end of World War II
- 58th General Hospital, Camp Patrick Henry, Virginia, 16 November 1945
- 60th General Hospital, end of World War II
- 61st General Hospital, end of World War II
- 62nd General Hospital, end of World War II
- 63rd General Hospital, end of World War II
- 64th General Hospital, Italy, 20 December 1945
- 65th General Hospital, end of World War II
- 67th General Hospital, end of World War II
- 68th General Hospital, end of World War II
- 69th General Hospital, end of World War II
- 70th General Hospital, Italy, 25 October 1945
- 71st General Hospital, end of World War II
- 74th General Hospital, end of World War II
- 76th General Hospital, 7 November 1945
- 78th General Hospital, Camp Beale, California, reorganized and redesignated as the 348th Station Hospital, 25 July 1943
- 79th General Hospital, end of World War II
- 80th General Hospital, end of World War II
- 81st General Hospital, end of World War II
- 82nd General Hospital, end of World War II
- 83rd General Hospital, end of World War II
- 90th General Hospital, end of World War II
- 91st General Hospital, Camp Kilmer, New Jersey, 1 February 1946
- 93rd General Hospital, end of World War II
- 94th General Hospital, end of World War II
- 95th General Hospital, end of World War II
- 96th General Hospital, end of World War II
- 97th General Hospital, Frankfurt Army Regional Medical Center, Frankfurt, Germany
- 98th General Hospital, end of World War II
- 99th General Hospital, end of World War II
- 100th General Hospital, Camp Kilmer, New Jersey, September 1945
- 101st General Hospital, end of World War II
- 102nd General Hospital, end of World War II
- 103rd General Hospital, end of World War II
- 104th General Hospital, end of World War II
- 105th General Hospital, end of World War II
- 106th General Hospital, end of World War II
- 107th General Hospital, end of World War II
- 108th General Hospital, end of World War II
- 109th General Hospital, end of World War II
- 110th General Hospital, end of World War II
- 111th General Hospital, end of World War II
- 112th General Hospital, Fort Lewis, Washington, 4 October 1945
- 113th General Hospital, Iran, disbanded 21 August 1945
- 114th General Hospital (1943-1944), deployed in Kidderminster, England.
- 115th General Hospital, end of World War II
- 116th General Hospital, end of World War II
- 117th General Hospital, end of World War II
- 118th General Hospital
- 119th General Hospital, end of World War II
- 121st General Hospital, end of World War II
- 122nd General Hospital, end of World War II
- 123rd General Hospital, end of World War II
- 124th General Hospital, end of World War II
- 125th General Hospital, end of World War II
- 127th General Hospital, end of World War II
- 128th General Hospital, end of World War II
- 129th General Hospital, end of World War II
- 130th General Hospital, end of World War II
- 131st General Hospital, end of World War II
- 133rd General Hospital, end of World War II
- 134th General Hospital, end of World War II
- 135th General Hospital, end of World War II
- 137th General Hospital, end of World War II
- 140th General Hospital, end of World War II
- 141st General Hospital, end of World War II
- 142nd General Hospital, end of World War II
- 142nd General Hospital, end of World War II
- 147th General Hospital, end of World War II
- 148th General Hospital, end of World War II
- 152nd General Hospital, end of World War II
- 154th General Hospital, end of World War II
- 155th General Hospital, 21 September 1945
- 156th General Hospital, end of World War II
- 157th General Hospital, end of World War II
- 158th General Hospital, end of World War II
- 159th General Hospital, end of World War II
- 160th General Hospital, end of World War II
- 161st General Hospital, San Juan, Puerto Rico, 15 January 1947
- 162nd General Hospital, end of World War II
- 163rd General Hospital, end of World War II
- 164th General Hospital, Camp Sibert, Georgia, 9 November 1945
- 165th General Hospital, end of World War II
- 166th General Hospital, end of World War II
- 167th General Hospital, end of World War II
- 168th General Hospital, end of World War II
- 169th General Hospital, end of World War II
- 170th General Hospital, inactivated 29 June 1945, but did not officially close until 21 September 1945
- 172nd General Hospital
  - China, 30 April 1946
  - Redesignated 23 May 1949 as the 455th General Hospital
- 173rd General Hospital, end of World War II
- 174th General Hospital, end of World War II
- 176th General Hospital, end of World War II
- 177th General Hospital, end of World War II
- 178th General Hospital, end of World War II
- 179th General Hospital, end of World War II
- 180th General Hospital, 31 January 1946
- 181st General Hospital, end of World War II
- 182nd General Hospital
  - Camp Kilmer, New Jersey, December 1945
  - Milwaukee, Wisconsin, reorganized and redesignated as the 452nd General Hospital, 1 February 1949
- 185th General Hospital, end of World War II
- 186th General Hospital, end of World War II
- 187th General Hospital, end of World War II
- 188th General Hospital, New York Port of Embarkation, New York, 6 December 1945
- 189th General Hospital, end of World War II
- 190th General Hospital, disbanded 15 March 1945?
- 191st General Hospital, 9 January 1946
- 192nd General Hospital, end of World War II
- 193rd General Hospital, end of World War II
- 194th General Hospital, end of World War II
- 195th General Hospital, end of World War II
- 196th General Hospital, end of World War II
- 197th General Hospital, end of World War II
- 198th General Hospital, end of World War II
- 199th General Hospital, end of World War II
- 200th General Hospital, end of World War II
- 201st General Hospital, end of World War II
- 202nd General Hospital, end of World War II
- 203rd General Hospital, Fort Lewis, Washington, 28 November 1945
- 204th General Hospital, end of World War II
- 207th General Hospital, disbanded 11 November 1944
- 208th General Hospital, Helgafell, Iceland, redesignated 327th Station Hospital 2 July 1943
- 209th General Hospital, disbanded 11 November 1944
- 210th General Hospital, Fort Gulick, Canal Zone, reorganized and redesignated 368th Station Hospital, 1 April 1944
- 216th General Hospital, Germany, redesignated 387th Station Hospital 1 April 1946
- 217th General Hospital, end of World War II
- 218th General Hospital, Fort Clayton, Canal Zone, reorganized and redesignated 333rd Station Hospital 1 April 1943
- 220th General Hospital, end of World War II
- 221st General Hospital, end of World War II
- 224th General Hospital, end of World War II
- 226th General Hospital, end of World War II
- 227th General Hospital, end of World War II
- 228th General Hospital, end of World War II
- 229th General Hospital, end of World War II
- 230th General Hospital, end of World War II
- 231st General Hospital, end of World War II
- 232nd General Hospital, end of World War II
- 234th General Hospital, end of World War II
- 235th General Hospital, end of World War II
- 236th General Hospital, end of World War II
- 237th General Hospital, end of World War II
- 238th General Hospital, end of World War II
- 239th General Hospital, end of World War II
- 240th General Hospital, end of World War II
- 241st General Hospital, end of World War II
- 242nd General Hospital, end of World War II
- 247th General Hospital, end of World War II
- 250th General Hospital, end of World War II
- 252nd General Hospital, end of World War II
- 253rd General Hospital, end of World War II
- 254th General Hospital, end of World War II
- 262nd General Hospital, Fort Clayton, Canal Zone, 7 February 1947
- 263rd General Hospital, end of World War II
- 279th General Hospital, end of World War II
- 280th General Hospital, end of World War II
- 297th General Hospital, end of World War II
- 298th General Hospital, Camp Kilmer, New Jersey, 5 October 1945
- 300th General Hospital, Italy, 31 May 1946
- 305th General Hospital, end of World War II
- 306th General Hospital, end of World War II
- 307th General Hospital, end of World War II
- 317th General Hospital, end of World War II
- 325th General Hospital, reorganized and redesignated as the 325th Field Hospital, 17 September 1993
- 373rd General Hospital, Guam, 15 January 1946
- 452nd General Hospital, Milwaukee, Wisconsin, reorganized and redesignated as the 452nd Combat Support Hospital, 1993
- 455th General Hospital, Providence, Rhode Island, reorganized and redesignated as the 455th Field Hospital, 17 September 1993
- 7428th General Hospital (Provisional German PW Hospital), end of World War II
- 7430th General Hospital (Provisional German PW Hospital), end of World War II
- 7431st General Hospital (Provisional German PW Hospital), end of World War II
- 7449th General Hospital (Provisional German PW Hospital), end of World War II
- 7451st General Hospital (Provisional German PW Hospital), end of World War II
- 8047th General Hospital (Provisional German PW Hospital), end of World War II
- 8048th General Hospital (Provisional German PW Hospital), end of World War II
- 8049th General Hospital (Provisional German PW Hospital), end of World War II
- 8055th General Hospital (Provisional German PW Hospital), end of World War II
- 8271st General Hospital (Provisional German PW Hospital), end of World War II
- 8274th General Hospital (Provisional German PW Hospital), end of World War II
- 8275th General Hospital (Provisional German PW Hospital), end of World War II
- 8277th General Hospital (Provisional German PW Hospital), end of World War II
- 8278th General Hospital (Provisional German PW Hospital), end of World War II
- 8279th General Hospital (Provisional German PW Hospital), end of World War II

== Combat support hospitals ==
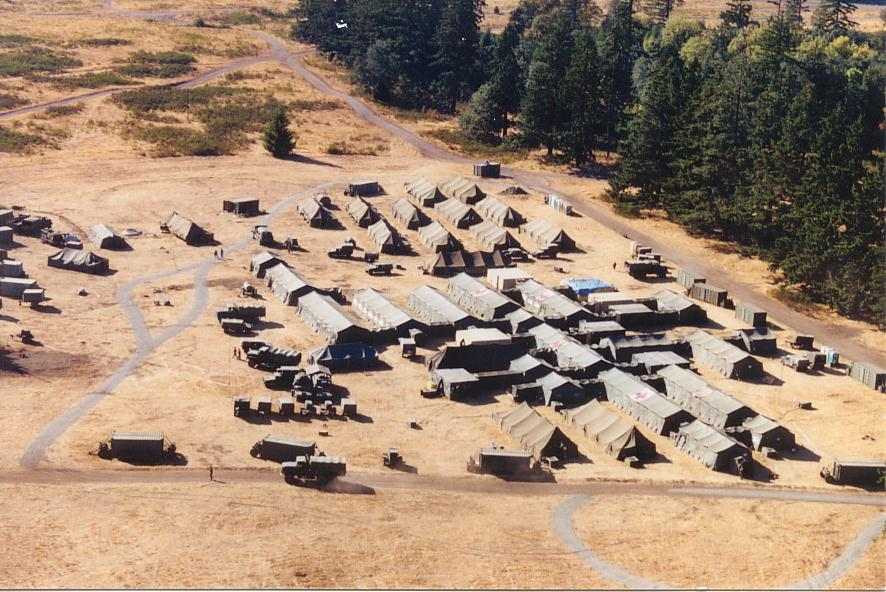
47th Combat Support Hospital at Fort Lewis, Washington, circa 2000.

- 4th Combat Support Hospital, Fort McClellan, Alabama, reorganized and redesignated as the 4th Evacuation Hospital, 16 March 1984
- 5th Combat Support Hospital, Fort Bragg, North Carolina, reorganized and redesignated as the 5th Surgical Hospital, 16 April 1982
- 8th Combat Support Hospital, Ft Ord California. 1977
- 10th Combat Support Hospital, Fort Carson, Colorado, reorganized and redesignated as the 10th Field Hospital, 16 June 2017
- 16th Combat Support Hospital, Ft Riley, KS
- 21st Combat Support Hospital, Fort Hood Texas, reorganized and redesignated as the 11th Field Hospital, 2019
- 28th Combat Support Hospital, Fort Bragg, North Carolina, April 2020
- 31st Combat Support Hospital, Fort Bliss, Texas,
  - Fort Bliss, Texas, reorganized and redesignated as the 131st Field Hospital, 17 August 1992
  - (Fort Bliss, Texas, 131st Field Hospital, reorganized and redesignated as the 31st Combat Support Hospital, 16 February 1996)
  - Reorganized and redesignated as the 131st Field Hospital, April 2018
- 41st Combat Support Hospital (41st CSH) (Fort Sam Houston, Texas)
- 46th Combat Support Hospital Fort Devens, Massachusetts, 15 July 1994
- 47th Combat Support Hospital, Fort Lewis, Washington
- 48th Combat Support Hospital, Fort George G. Meade, Maryland, November 2017 (US Army Reserve)
- 67th Combat Support Hospital, Würzburg, Germany, 19 October 2007
- 75th Combat Support Hospital, Tuscaloosa, Alabama (US Army Reserve)
- 85th Combat Support Hospital (1976)
- 86th Combat Support Hospital
  - Fort Campbell, Kentucky, reorganized and redesignated 86th Evacuation Hospital, 16 March 1984
  - (Fort Campbell, Kentucky, again reorganized and redesignated 86th Combat Support Hospital, 16 November 1993)
  - Fort Campbell, Kentucky, reorganized and redesignated as the 586th Field Hospital
- 94th Combat Support Hospital, Seagoville, Texas (US Army Reserve)
- 121st Combat Support Hospital (121st CSH) (Camp Humphreys, Pyeongtaek, South Korea)
- 114th Combat Support Hospital, Minneapolis, Minnesota (US Army Reserve)
- 117th Combat Support Hospital, Texas Army National Guard (1976)
- 128th Combat Support Hospital, Ludwigsburg, Germany
- 151st Combat Support Hospital, Frankfurt Army Regional Medical Center, Frankfurt, Germany (1995)
- 212th Combat Support Hospital, Rhine Ordnance Barracks, Germany
- 228th Combat Support Hospital, Fort Sam Houston, Texas (US Army Reserve)
- 256th Combat Support Hospital, Twinsburg, Ohio (US Army Reserve)
- 309th Combat Support Hospital, Hanscom AFB, Massachusetts (US Army Reserve)
- 324th Combat Support Hospital, Perrine, Florida (US Army Reserve)
- 325th Combat Support Hospital, Independence, Missouri (US Army Reserve)
- 328th Combat Support Hospital, San Paulo, California, (US Army Reserve) reorganized and redesignated as the 328th Field Hospital, 12 September 2020
- 331st Combat Support Hospital, Utica, New York (US Army Reserve)
- 337th Combat Support Hospital, Indianapolis, Indiana (US Army Reserve)
- 339th Combat Support Hospital, Coraopolis, PA (2011) (US Army Reserve)
- 344th Combat Support Hospital, Fort Totten, New York (US Army Reserve)
- 345th Combat Support Hospital, Jacksonville, FL (US Army Reserve)
- 349th Combat Support Hospital, Bell, California (US Army Reserve)
- 352nd Combat Support Hospital, Camp Parks, California, (US Army Reserve) reorganized and redesignated as the 352nd Field Hospital, 12 September 2020
- 369th Combat Support Hospital, San Juan, Puerto Rico (US Army Reserve)
- 376th Combat Support Hospital, Liverpool, NY (US Army Reserve)
- 377th Combat Support Hospital, Chattanooga, Tennessee (US Army Reserve)
- 396th Combat Support Hospital, Vancouver, Washington (US Army Reserve)
- 399th Combat Support Hospital, Fort Devens, Massachusetts (US Army Reserve)
- 401st Combat Support Hospital, Grand Rapids, Michigan (US Army Reserve)
- 405th Combat Support Hospital, Worcester, Massachusetts (US Army Reserve)
- 452nd Combat Support Hospital, Milwaukee, Wisconsin (US Army Reserve)
- 801st Combat Support Hospital, Fort Sheridan, Illinois (US Army Reserve)
- 865th Combat Support Hospital, Utica, New York (US Army Reserve)
- 914th Combat Support Hospital, Columbus, Ohio (US Army Reserve)

== Forward Surgical Teams, and; Forward Resuscitative and Surgical Teams ==
- 1st Forward Surgical Team
- 2nd Forward Surgical Team
- 8th Forward Surgical Team
- 10th Forward Resuscitative and Surgical Team, 528th Hospital Center, 1st MED BDE, El Paso, Texas
- 67th Forward Surgical Team (Airborne), 212th CSH, Rhine Ordinance Barracks, Germany
- 102nd Forward Surgical Team
- 126th Forward Surgical Team
- 135th Forward Surgical Team, 121 CSH, Camp Humphreys, South Korea
- 160th Forward Surgical Team
- 240th Forward Surgical Team
- 250th Forward Surgical Team
- 274th Forward Surgical Team (Airborne)
- 402nd Forward Surgical Team
- 541st Forward Surgical Team (Airborne)
- 555th Forward Surgical Team
- 624th Forward Surgical Team
- 628th Forward Surgical Team
- 629th Forward Surgical Team
- 691st Forward Surgical Team
- 745th Forward Surgical Team, 31st CSH, El Paso, Texas
- 758th Forward Surgical Team
- 759th Forward Surgical Team (Airborne)
- 772nd Forward Surgical Team
- 848th Forward Surgical Team
- 874th Forward Surgical Team
- 909th Forward Surgical Team
- 911th Forward Surgical Team
- 912th Forward Surgical Team
- 915th Forward Surgical Team
- 932nd Forward Surgical Team
- 933rd Forward Surgical Team
- 934th Forward Surgical Team, 807th Medical Command, Salt Lake City, Utah
- 936th Forward Surgical Team
- 945th Forward Surgical Team
- 946th Forward Surgical Team
- 947th Forward Surgical Team
- 948th Forward Surgical Team
- 1980th Forward Surgical Team
- 1982nd Forward Surgical Team

== Evacuation hospitals ==
=== World War I ===
- Evacuation Hospital No. 1, Camp Funston, Kansas, May 1919
- Evacuation Hospital No. 2, Camp Zachary Taylor, Kentucky, May 1919
- Evacuation Hospital No. 3, Camp Dix, New Jersey, April 1919
- Evacuation Hospital No. 4, Camp Upton, New York, May 1919
- Evacuation Hospital No. 5
  - Camp Upton, New York, 14 March 1919
  - Reconstituted 9 November 1936 and Consolidated with the 5th Evacuation Hospital
- Evacuation Hospital No. 6, Camp Dix, New Jersey, May 1919
- Evacuation Hospital No. 7, Camp Devens, Massachusetts, May 1919
- Evacuation Hospital No. 8, Camp Upton, New York, June 1919
- Evacuation Hospital No. 9, Camp Dix, New Jersey, July 1919
- Evacuation Hospital No. 10, Camp Devens, Massachusetts, June 1919
- Evacuation Hospital No. 11, Camp Zachary Taylor, Kentucky, May 1919
- Evacuation Hospital No. 12
  - Camp Dodge, Iowa, 7 July 1919
  - Reconstituted 10 November 1936 and Consolidated with the 12th Evacuation Hospital
- Evacuation Hospital No. 13, Camp Sherman, Ohio, July 1919
- Evacuation Hospital No. 14, Camp Sherman, Ohio, May 1919
- Evacuation Hospital No. 15
  - Camp Lewis, Washington, 28 June 1919
  - Reconstituted 9 November 1936 and Consolidated with the 15th Evacuation Hospital
- Evacuation Hospital No. 16, Camp Lewis, Washington, August 1919
- Evacuation Hospital No. 17
- Evacuation Hospital No. 18, Camp Pike, Arkansas, May 1919
- Evacuation Hospital No. 19, Camp Pike, Arkansas, August 1919
- Evacuation Hospital No. 20, Camp Zachary Taylor, Kentucky, June 1919
- Evacuation Hospital No. 21, Camp Pike, Arkansas, June 1919
- Evacuation Hospital No. 22, Camp Upton, New York, June 1919
- Evacuation Hospital No. 23, Camp Gordon, Georgia, June 1919
- Evacuation Hospital No. 24, Camp Gordon, Georgia, June 1919
- Evacuation Hospital No. 25, Camp Dodge, Iowa, May 1919
- Evacuation Hospital No. 26, Camp Upton, New York, August 1919
- Evacuation Hospital No. 27, Camp Dix, New Jersey, September 1919
- Evacuation Hospital No. 28, Camp Sherman, Ohio, July 1919
- Evacuation Hospital No. 29, Camp Shelby, Mississippi, July 1919
- Evacuation Hospital No. 30, Camp Dix, New Jersey, August 1919
- Evacuation Hospital No. 31, Camp Pike, Arkansas, July 1919
- Evacuation Hospital No. 32, Camp Dix, New Jersey, June 1919
- Evacuation Hospital No. 33, Camp Dodge, Iowa, May 1919
- Evacuation Hospital No. 34, Camp Dix, New Jersey, May 1919
- Evacuation Hospital No. 35, Camp Lee, Virginia, April 1919
- Evacuation Hospital No. 36, Camp Stuart, Virginia, July 1919
- Evacuation Hospital No. 37, Camp Devens, Massachusetts, July 1919
- Evacuation Hospital No. 38, Camp Meade, Maryland, December 1918
- Evacuation Hospital No. 39, Camp Greenleaf, Georgia, December 1918
- Evacuation Hospital No. 40, Camp Greenleaf, Georgia, December 1918
- Evacuation Hospital No. 41, Camp Greenleaf, Georgia, December 1918
- Evacuation Hospital No. 42, Camp Greenleaf, Georgia, December 1918
- Evacuation Hospital No. 43, Camp Greenleaf, Georgia, December 1918
- Evacuation Hospital No. 44, Camp Greenleaf, Georgia, December 1918
- Evacuation Hospital No. 45, Camp Greenleaf, Georgia, December 1918
- Evacuation Hospital No. 46, Camp Greenleaf, Georgia, December 1918
- Evacuation Hospital No. 47, Camp Greenleaf, Georgia, December 1918
- Evacuation Hospital No. 48, Camp Greenleaf, Georgia, December 1918
- Evacuation Hospital No. 49, Camp Dix, New Jersey, August 1919
- Evacuation Hospital No. 50, Camp Greenleaf, Georgia, December 1918
- Evacuation Hospital No. 51, Camp Greenleaf, Georgia, December 1918
- Evacuation Hospital No. 52, Camp Greenleaf, Georgia, December 1918
- Evacuation Hospital No. 53, Camp Greenleaf, Georgia, December 1918
- Evacuation Hospital No. 54, Camp Greenleaf, Georgia, December 1918
- Evacuation Hospital No. 55, Camp Greenleaf, Georgia, December 1918
- Evacuation Hospital No. 56, Camp Greenleaf, Georgia, December 1918
- Evacuation Hospital No. 57, Camp Greenleaf, Georgia, December 1918
- Evacuation Hospital No. 58, Camp Greenleaf, Georgia, December 1918
- Evacuation Hospital No. 59, Camp Greenleaf, Georgia, December 1918
- Evacuation Hospital No. 60, Camp Greenleaf, Georgia, December 1918
- Evacuation Hospitals No. 61 to 113 Not Organized
- Evacuation Hospital No. 114, Overseas, March 1919

=== World War II and later ===
- 1st Evacuation Hospital, End of World War II
- 2nd Evacuation Hospital, End of World War II
- 4th Evacuation Hospital, disbanded 24 August 1942
- 5th Evacuation Hospital
  - Camp Kilmer, New Jersey, 5 March 1946
  - Fort Bragg, North Carolina, reorganized and redesignated as the 5th Combat Support Hospital, 26 June 1972
- 6th Evacuation Hospital, disbanded 24 August 1942
- 7th Evacuation Hospital, End of World War II
- 8th Evacuation Hospital, Leghorn, Italy, 30 September 1945
- 9th Evacuation Hospital, End of World War II
- 10th Evacuation Hospital
  - End of World War II
  - Germany, 16 August 1965
  - Fort Meade, Maryland, reorganized and redesignated as the 10th Surgical Hospital, 16 August 1983
- 11th Evacuation Hospital
  - End of World War II
  - 1953
- 12th Evacuation Hospital
  - Camp Kilmer, New Jersey, 6 January 1946
  - Fort Lewis, Washington, 15 December 1970
  - Germany, reorganized and redesignated as the 212th Surgical Hospital, 16 January 1992
- 14th Evacuation Hospital, End of World War II
- 15th Evacuation Hospital
  - Italy, 8 September 1945
  - Reorganized and redesignated as the 15th Combat Support Hospital, 21 December 1973
  - (Again reorganized and redesignated as the 15th Evacuation Hospital, 16 March 1984)
  - Reorganized and redesignated as the 115th Field Hospital, 16 October 1994
- 16th Evacuation Hospital, Italy, 31 October 1945
- 19th Evacuation Hospital, disbanded 25 August 1942
- 21st Evacuation Hospital, End of World War II
- 21st Evacuation Hospital,
  - (Redesignated from the 11th Field Hospital)
  - Germany, 16 August 1965
  - Fort Hood, Texas, reorganized and redesignated 21st Combat Support Hospital, 16 December 1992
- 24th Evacuation Hospital
  - Rotenberg, Germany, 4 February 1946
  - Long Binh Post, Republic of Vietnam, 25 November 1972
- 25th Evacuation Hospital, End of World War II
- 27th Evacuation Hospital, 10 December 1945
- 29th Evacuation Hospital,
  - End of World War II
  - Can Tho, Republic of Vietnam, 22 October 1969
- 30th Evacuation Hospital, End of World War II
- 32nd Evacuation Hospital, End of World War II
- 34th Evacuation Hospital, End of World War II
- 35th Evacuation Hospital, End of World War II
- 36th Evacuation Hospital, Vung Tau, Republic of Vietnam, 25 November 1969
- 38th Evacuation Hospital, Florence, Italy, 8 September 1945
- 39th Evacuation Hospital Camp Miles Standish, Massachusetts, 14 November 1945
- 41st Evacuation Hospital, End of World War II
- 42nd Evacuation Hospital, End of World War II
- 44th Evacuation Hospital, Camp Miles Standish, Massachusetts, 21 November 1945
- 45th Evacuation Hospital, Camp Miles Standish, Massachusetts, 21 November 1945
- 48th Evacuation Hospital, End of World War II
- 51st Evacuation Hospital, January 1946
- 52nd Evacuation Hospital, End of World War II
- 54th Evacuation Hospital, End of World War II
- 56th Evacuation Hospital, October 1945
- 58th Evacuation Hospital, End of World War II
- 59th Evacuation Hospital, End of World War II
- 65th Evacuation Hospital, End of World War II
- 67th Evacuation Hospital
  - Camp Kilmer, New Jersey, 1 January 1946
  - Pleiku, Republic of Vietnam, 20 March 1973
  - Würzburg, Germany, reorganized and redesignated 67th Combat Support Hospital, 16 July 1993
- 71st Evacuation Hospital
  - End of World War II
  - Fort Lewis, Washington, 15 December 1970
- 73rd Evacuation Hospital, End of World War II
- 77th Evacuation Hospital, End of World War II
- 86th Evacuation Hospital
  - Japan, 28 February 1946
  - Fort Campbell, Kentucky, reorganized and redesignated 86th Combat Support Hospital, 21 December 1972
  - (Fort Campbell, Kentucky, again reorganized and redesignated 86th Evacuation Hospital, 16 March 1984)
  - Fort Campbell, Kentucky, reorganized and redesignated 86th Combat Support Hospital, 16 November 1993
- 91st Evacuation Hospital,
  - End of World War II
  - Fort Lewis, Washington, 28 November 1971
- 92nd Evacuation Hospital, Japan, February 1946
- 93rd Evacuation Hospital
  - Camp Kilmer, New Jersey, 12 December 1945
  - Fort Leonard Wood, Missouri, 17 July 1994
- 95th Evacuation Hospital
  - Camp Kilmer, New Jersey, 3 December 1945
  - Danang, Republic of Vietnam, 9 March 1973
- 96th Evacuation Hospital, Camp Patrick Henry, Virginia, 16 December 1945
- 97th Evacuation Hospital, Camp Miles Standish, Massachusetts, 23 November 1945
- 99th Evacuation Hospital, Utsunomiya, Honshu, Japan, 28 February 1946
- 100th Evacuation Hospital, End of World War II
- 101st Evacuation Hospital, End of World War II
- 102nd Evacuation Hospital, End of World War II
- 103rd Evacuation Hospital, End of World War II
- 103rd Evacuation Hospital, End of World War II
- 104th Evacuation Hospital, End of World War II
- 105th Evacuation Hospital
  - Camp Miles Standish, Massachusetts, 21 November 1945
  - Reorganized and redesignated as the 399th Evacuation Hospital 1 October 1953
- 106th Evacuation Hospital, End of World War II
- 107th Evacuation Hospital, End of World War II
- 108th Evacuation Hospital, End of World War II
- 109th Evacuation Hospital, End of World War II
- 110th Evacuation Hospital, End of World War II
- 111th Evacuation Hospital, End of World War II
- 114th Evacuation Hospital, Weilburg, Germany, 25 January 1946
- 116th Evacuation Hospital, End of World War II
- 117th Evacuation Hospital, Linz, Austria, 25 February 1946
- 118th Evacuation Hospital, End of World War II
- 119th Evacuation Hospital, End of World War II
- 120th Evacuation Hospital, End of World War II
- 121st Evacuation Hospital, End of World War II
- 122nd Evacuation Hospital, End of World War II
- 123rd Evacuation Hospital, End of World War II
- 124th Evacuation Hospital, End of World War II
- 125th Evacuation Hospital, End of World War II
- 126th Evacuation Hospital, End of World War II
- 127th Evacuation Hospital, End of World War II
- 128th Evacuation Hospital, Camp Kilmer, New Jersey, 12 January 1946
- 130th Evacuation Hospital, Camp Kilmer, New Jersey, 5 November 1945
- 131st Evacuation Hospital, End of World War II
- 132nd Evacuation Hospital, End of World War II
- 137th Evacuation Hospital, End of World War II
- 139th Evacuation Hospital, End of World War II
- 172nd Evacuation Hospital, End of World War II
- 320th Evacuation Hospital New York, New York (US Army Reserve)
- 343rd Evacuation Hospital Fort Hamilton, New York
- 361st Evacuation Hospital, End of World War II
- 399th Evacuation Hospital, Taunton, Massachusetts, reorganized and redesignated as the 399th Combat Support Hospital, 1 October 1974

== Base hospitals ==
World War I
This was a specific unit designation, much like a Combat Support, MASH, or Evacuation Hospital

- Base Hospital No. 1, Camp Upton, New York, May 1919
- Base Hospital No. 2, Camp Meade, Maryland, February 1919
- Base Hospital No. 3, Camp Upton, New York, March 1919
- Base Hospital No. 4, Camp Sherman, Ohio, April 1919
- Base Hospital No. 5, Camp Devens, Massachusetts, May 1919
- Base Hospital No. 6, Camp Devens, Massachusetts, April 1919
- Base Hospital No. 7, Camp Devens, Massachusetts, April 1919
- Base Hospital No. 8, Camp Lee, Virginia, April 1919
- Base Hospital No. 9, Camp Upton, New York, May 1919
- Base Hospital No. 10, Camp Dix, New Jersey, April 1919
- Base Hospital No. 11, Camp Grant, Illinois, April 1919
- Base Hospital No. 12, Camp Grant, Illinois, April 1919
- Base Hospital No. 13, Camp Grant, Illinois, April 1919
- Base Hospital No. 14, Camp Grant, Illinois, May 1919
- Base Hospital No. 15, Camp Dodge, Iowa, July 1919
- Base Hospital No. 16, Biltmore, North Carolina, April 1919
- Base Hospital No. 17, Camp Custer, Michigan, May 1919
- Base Hospital No. 18, Camp Upton, New York, 25 February 1919
- Base Hospital No. 19, Camp Upton, New York, 7 May 1919
- Base Hospital No. 20, Camp Dix, New Jersey, May 1919
- Base Hospital No. 21, Camp Funston, Kansas, May 1919
- Base Hospital No. 22, Camp Grant, Illinois, March 1919
- Base Hospital No. 23, Camp Upton, New York, May 1919
- Base Hospital No. 24, Camp Shelby, Mississippi, April 1919
- Base Hospital No. 25, Camp Zachary Taylor, Kentucky, May 1919
- Base Hospital No. 26, Camp Grant, Illinois, May 1919
- Base Hospital No. 27, Camp Dix, New Jersey, March 1919
- Base Hospital No. 28, Camp Dix, New Jersey, May 1919
- Base Hospital No. 29, Fort Logan, California, March 1919
- Base Hospital No. 30, Presidio of San Francisco, California, May 1919
- Base Hospital No. 31, Camp Dix, New Jersey, May 1919
- Base Hospital No. 32, Camp Zachary Taylor, Kentucky, May 1919
- Base Hospital No. 33, Camp Upton, New York, March 1919
- Base Hospital No. 34, Camp Dix, New Jersey, April 1919
- Base Hospital No. 35
  - Camp Kearny, California, 6 May 1919
  - Reconstituted 8 October 1936 and Consolidated with the 35th General Hospital, consolidated unit designated as the 35th General Hospital
- Base Hospital No. 36, Camp Custer, Michigan, May 1919
- Base Hospital No. 37, Camp Upton, New York, March 1919
- Base Hospital No. 38, Camp Dix, New Jersey, May 1919
- Base Hospital No. 39, Camp Devens, Massachusetts, January 1919
- Base Hospital No. 40, Camp Zachary Taylor, Kentucky, April 1919
- Base Hospital No. 41, Camp Lee, Virginia, April 1919
- Base Hospital No. 42, Camp Meade, Maryland, May 1919
- Base Hospital No. 43, Camp Gordon, Georgia, March 1919
- Base Hospital No. 44, Camp Devens, Massachusetts, May 1919
- Base Hospital No. 45, Camp Lee, Virginia, April 1919
- Base Hospital No. 46, Camp Lewis, Washington, May 1919
- Base Hospital No. 47, Presidio of San Francisco, California, May 1919
- Base Hospital No. 48, Camp Upton, New York, 7 May 1919
- Base Hospital No. 49, Camp Dodge, Iowa, May 1919
- Base Hospital No. 50
  - Camp Lewis, Washington, 5 May 1919
  - Reconstituted 19 October 1936, Consolidated with the 50th General Hospital, and the combined unit designated as the 50th General Hospital
- Base Hospital No. 51, Camp Dix, New Jersey, June 1919
- Base Hospital No. 52, Camp Sherman, Ohio, May 1919
- Base Hospital No. 53, Camp Sherman, Ohio, July 1919
- Base Hospital No. 54, Camp Grant, Ohio, May 1919
- Base Hospital No. 55, Camp Pike, Arkansas, June 1919
- Base Hospital No. 56, Camp Dix, New Jersey, May 1919
- Base Hospital No. 57, Overseas, August 1919
- Base Hospital No. 58, Camp Dix, New Jersey, May 1919
- Base Hospital No. 59, Camp Dix, New Jersey, July 1919
- Base Hospital No. 60, Camp Sherman, Ohio, July 1919
- Base Hospital No. 61, Camp Dix, New Jersey, July 1919
- Base Hospital No. 62, Camp Dix, New Jersey, July 1919
- Base Hospital No. 63, Camp Merritt, New Jersey, April 1919
- Base Hospital No. 64, Camp Dix, New Jersey, June 1919
- Base Hospital No. 65, Camp Lee, Virginia, August 1919
- Base Hospital No. 66, Camp Devens, Massachusetts, February 1919
- Base Hospital No. 67, Camp Dix, New Jersey and Camp Sherman, Ohio, May 1919
- Base Hospital No. 68, Camp Dix, New Jersey and Camp Sherman, Ohio, May 1919
- Base Hospital No. 69, Camp Grant, Illinois, July 1919
- Base Hospital No. 70, Camp Pike, Arkansas, May 1919
- Base Hospital No. 71, Camp Shelby, Mississippi, May 1919
- Base Hospital No. 72, Camp Dix, New Jersey, May 1919
- Base Hospital No. 73, Camp Greenleaf, Georgia, December 1918
- Base Hospital No. 74, Camp Greenleaf, Georgia, December 1918
- Base Hospital No. 75, Camp Greenleaf, Georgia, December 1918
- Base Hospital No. 76, Camp Dix, New Jersey, May 1919
- Base Hospital No. 77, Camp Upton, New York, May 1919
- Base Hospital No. 78, Camp Dix, New Jersey, June 1919
- Base Hospital No. 79, Camp Upton, New York, July 1919
- Base Hospital No. 80, Camp Upton, New York, May 1919
- Base Hospital No. 81, Camp Dodge, Iowa, June 1919
- Base Hospital No. 82, Camp Devens, Massachusetts, June 1919
- Base Hospital No. 83, Camp Dix, New Jersey, May 1919
- Base Hospital No. 84, Camp Bowie, Texas, July 1919
- Base Hospital No. 85, Camp Upton, New York, July 1919
- Base Hospital No. 86, Camp Dix, New Jersey, May 1919
- Base Hospital No. 87, Camp Funston, Kansas, June 1919
- Base Hospital No. 88, Camp Dodge, Iowa, July 1919
- Base Hospital No. 89, Camp Dix, New Jersey, July 1919
- Base Hospital No. 90, Camp Custer, Michigan, July 1919
- Base Hospital No. 91, Camp Upton, New York, August 1919
- Base Hospital No. 92, Camp Upton, New York, April 1919
- Base Hospital No. 93, Camp Lewis, Washington, June 1919
- Base Hospital No. 94, Camp Bowie, Texas, April 1919
- Base Hospital No. 95, Fort D. A. Russell, Wyoming, July 1919
- Base Hospital No. 96, Presidio of San Francisco, California, May 1919
- Base Hospital No. 97, Camp Dix, New Jersey, April 1919
- Base Hospital No. 98, Camp Dix, New Jersey, June 1919
- Base Hospital No. 99, Camp Custer, Michigan, June 1919
- Base Hospital No. 100, Camp Sherman, Ohio, July 1919
- Base Hospital No. 101, Camp Dix, New Jersey, July 1919
- Base Hospital No. 102, Camp Shelby, Mississippi, May 1919
- Base Hospital No. 103, Camp Funston, Kansas, July 1919
- Base Hospital No. 104, Camp Dix, New Jersey, July 1919
- Base Hospital No. 105, Camp Dix, New Jersey, April 1919
- Base Hospital No. 106, Camp Dix, New Jersey, July 1919
- Base Hospital No. 107, Camp Pike, Arkansas, July 1919
- Base Hospital No. 108, Camp Dodge, Iowa, July 1919
- Base Hospital No. 109, Camp Dodge, Iowa, May 1919
- Base Hospital No. 110, Camp Dix, New Jersey, July 1919
- Base Hospital No. 111, Camp Dix, New Jersey, June 1919
- Base Hospital No. 112, Camp Dix, New Jersey, April 1919
- Base Hospital No. 113, Camp Dix, New Jersey, August 1919
- Base Hospital No. 114, Camp Meade, Maryland, May 1919
- Base Hospital No. 115, Camp Dix, New Jersey, May 1919
- Base Hospital No. 116, Camp Upton, New York, May 1919
- Base Hospital No. 117, Overseas, January 1919
- Base Hospital No. 118, Camp Zachary Taylor, Kentucky, July 1919
- Base Hospital No. 119, Camp Zachary Taylor, Kentucky, July 1919
- Base Hospital No. 120, Camp Dodge, Iowa, July 1919
- Base Hospital No. 121, Camp Dodge, Iowa, July 1919
- Base Hospital No. 122, Camp Greene, North Carolina,
- Base Hospital No. 123, Camp Pike, Arkansas, July 1919
- Base Hospital No. 124, Camp Hancock, Georgia, January 1919
- Base Hospital No. 125, Camp Hancock, Georgia, January 1919
- Base Hospital No. 126, Camp McClellan, Alabama, December 1918
- Base Hospital No. 127, Camp McClellan, Alabama, December 1918
- Base Hospital No. 128, Camp Sevier, South Carolina, December 1918
- Base Hospital No. 129, Camp Shelby, Mississippi, December 1918
- Base Hospital No. 130, Camp Shelby, Mississippi, December 1918
- Base Hospital No. 131, Camp Zachary Taylor, Kentucky, June 1919
- Base Hospital No. 132, Camp Sheridan, Alabama, December 1918
- Base Hospital No. 133, Camp Sheridan, Alabama, December 1918
- Base Hospital No. 134, Camp Wadsworth, South Carolina, January 1919
- Base Hospital No. 135, Camp Wadsworth, South Carolina, January 1919
- Base Hospital No. 136, Camp Upton, New York, July 1919
- Base Hospital No. 137, Camp Wheeler, Georgia, December 1918
- Base Hospital No. 138, Fort Ontario, New York, December 1918
- Base Hospital No. 139, Camp May, New Jersey, December 1918
- Base Hospital No. 140, Camp Joseph E. Johnson, Florida, December 1918
- Base Hospital No. 141, Fort Ethan Allen, Vermont, December 1918
- Base Hospital No. 142, Fort Sheridan, Illinois, December 1918
- Base Hospital No. 143, Fort Sheridan, Illinois, December 1918
- Base Hospital No. 144, Camp Dodge, Iowa, December 1918
- Base Hospital No. 145, Fort Benjamin Harrison, Indiana, December 1918
- Base Hospital No. 146, Camp Jackson, South Carolina, December 1918
- Base Hospital No. 147, Camp Greene, North Carolina, December 1918
- Base Hospital No. 148, Camp Sevier, South Carolina, December 1918
- Base Hospital No. 149, Camp Sherman, Ohio, December 1918
- Base Hospital No. 150, Camp Travis, Texas, December 1918
- Base Hospital No. 151, Camp Greenleaf, Georgia, December 1918
- Base Hospital No. 152, Camp Greenleaf, Georgia, December 1918
- Base Hospital No. 153, Camp Greenleaf, Georgia, December 1918
- Base Hospital No. 154, Camp Greenleaf, Georgia, December 1918
- Base Hospital No. 155, Camp Greenleaf, Georgia, December 1918
- Base Hospital No. 156, Camp Greenleaf, Georgia, December 1918
- Base Hospital No. 157, Camp Greenleaf, Georgia, December 1918
- Base Hospital No. 158, Camp Greenleaf, Georgia, December 1918
- Base Hospital No. 159, Camp Greenleaf, Georgia, December 1918
- Base Hospital No. 160, Camp Greenleaf, Georgia, December 1918
- Base Hospital No. 161, Camp Greenleaf, Georgia, December 1918
- Base Hospital No. 162, Camp Lewis, Washington, December 1918
- Base Hospital No. 163, Camp Bowie, Texas, December 1918
- Base Hospital No. 164, Camp Logan, Texas, January 1919
- Base Hospital No. 165, Camp MacArthur, Texas, January 1919
- Base Hospitals No. 166 through 201, Never Organized
- Base Hospital No. 202, Camp Dix, New Jersey, April 1919
- Base Hospital No. 203, Never Organized
- Base Hospital No. 204, Overseas, January 1919
- Base Hospital No. 205 through 207, Never Organized
- Base Hospital No. 208, Camp Dix, New Jersey, June 1919
- Base Hospital No. 209, Never Organized
- Base Hospital No. 210, Presidio of San Francisco, California, June 1919
- Base Hospitals No. 211 through 213, Never Organized
- Base Hospital No. 214, Camp Dix, New Jersey, July 1919
- Base Hospital No. 215, Never Organized
- Base Hospital No. 216, New Jersey, July 1919
- Base Hospital No. 217, Never Organized
- Base Hospital No. 218, See Camp Hospital No. 61
- Base Hospitals No. 219 through 221, Never Organized
- Base Hospital No. 222, Overseas, November 1918
- Base Hospital No. 223, Never Organized
- Base Hospital No. 224, Overseas, November 1918
- Base Hospitals No. 225 through 227, Never Organized
- Base Hospital No. 228, Overseas, November 1918
- Base Hospital No. 229, Never Organized
- Base Hospital No. 230, Overseas, November 1918
- Base Hospitals No. 231 through 233, Never Organized
- Base Hospital No. 234, Overseas, November 1918
- Base Hospital No. 235, Never Organized
- Base Hospital No. 236, See Camp Hospital No. 92
- Base Hospital No. 237, Never Organized
- Base Hospital No. 238, Overseas, February 1919

== Camp hospitals ==
World War I
This was a specific unit designation, much like a Combat Support, MASH, or Evacuation Hospital

- Camp Hospital No. 1, Camp Dix, New Jersey, June 1919
- Camp Hospital No. 2, Camp Jackson, South Carolina, July 1919
- Camp Hospital No. 3, Camp Devens, Massachusetts, June 1919
- Camp Hospital No. 4, Camp Sherman, Ohio, July 1919
- Camp Hospital No. 5, Fort Upton, New York, July 1919
- Camp Hospital No. 6, Camp Dodge, Iowa, July 1919
- Camp Hospital No. 7, France, March 1919
- Camp Hospital No. 8, Camp Sherman, Ohio, June 1919
- Camp Hospital No. 9, Camp Sherman, Ohio, June 1919
- Camp Hospital No. 10, France, March 1919
- Camp Hospital No. 11, Camp Sherman, Ohio,
- Camp Hospital No. 12, Camp Gordon, Georgia,
- Camp Hospital No. 13, France, December 1918
- Camp Hospital No. 14, Camp Dodge, Iowa, June 1919
- Camp Hospital No. 15, Camp Dodge, Iowa,
- Camp Hospital No. 16, Not Organized
- Camp Hospital No. 17, Not Organized
- Camp Hospital No. 18, France, August 1918
- Camp Hospital No. 19, Camp A. P. Hill, Virginia, July 1919
- Camp Hospital No. 20, France, May 1919
- Camp Hospital No. 21, Camp Dix, New Jersey, June 1919
- Camp Hospital No. 22, France, February 1919
- Camp Hospital No. 23, France, August 1918
- Camp Hospital No. 24, France, April 1918
- Camp Hospital No. 25, Camp Upton, New York, June 1919
- Camp Hospital No. 26, Camp Upton, New York, June 1919
- Camp Hospital No. 27, Camp Dix, New Jersey, August 1919
- Camp Hospital No. 28, Camp Dix, New Jersey, July 1919
- Camp Hospital No. 29, France, March 1919
- Camp Hospital No. 30, France, January 1919
- Camp Hospital No. 31, France, April 1919
- Camp Hospital No. 32, Not Organized
- Camp Hospital No. 33
- Camp Hospital No. 34, France, February 1919
- Camp Hospital No. 35, France, February 1919
- Camp Hospital No. 36, France, November 1918
- Camp Hospital No. 37, France, February 1919
- Camp Hospital No. 38, France, April 1919
- Camp Hospital No. 39, Camp Dix, New Jersey, June 1919
- Camp Hospital No. 40, Camp Grant, Illinois, May 1919
- Camp Hospital No. 41, Camp Devens, Massachusetts, July 1919
- Camp Hospital No. 42, Camp Dodge, Iowa, June 1919
- Camp Hospital No. 43, France, September 1919
- Camp Hospital No. 44, France, December 1918
- Camp Hospital No. 45, Camp Grant, Illinois, July 1919
- Camp Hospital No. 46, France, February 1919
- Camp Hospital No. 47, redesignated Base Hospital No. 208, November 1918
- Camp Hospital No. 48, Camp Dodge, Iowa, July 1919
- Camp Hospital No. 49, Camp Devens, Massachusetts, June 1919
- Camp Hospital No. 50, Camp Upton, New York, July 1919
- Camp Hospital No. 51, France, December 1918
- Camp Hospital No. 52, Camp Gordon, Georgia, July 1919
- Camp Hospital No. 53, Camp Zachary Taylor, Kentucky, July 1919
- Camp Hospital No. 54, France, reorganized and redesignated Camp Hospital No. 78, October 1918
- Camp Hospital No. 55, France, May 1919
- Camp Hospital No. 56, France, January 1919
- Camp Hospital No. 57, France, January 1919
- Camp Hospital No. 58, Not Organized
- Camp Hospital No. 59, France, March 1919
- Camp Hospital No. 60, France, December 1918
- Camp Hospital No. 61, Camp Upton, New York, July 1919
- Camp Hospital No. 62, France, November 1918
- Camp Hospital No. 63, Not Organized
- Camp Hospital No. 64, Camp Dix, New Jersey, June 1919
- Camp Hospital No. 65, Camp Grant, Illinois, June 1919
- Camp Hospital No. 66, Camp Upton, New York, July 1919
- Camp Hospital No. 67, France, April 1919
- Camp Hospital No. 68, Camp Devens, Massachusetts, July 1919
- Camp Hospital No. 69, France, December 1918
- Camp Hospital No. 70, France, February 1919
- Camp Hospital No. 71, France, October 1918
- Camp Hospital No. 72, Camp Upton, New York, July 1919
- Camp Hospital No. 73, France, January 1919
- Camp Hospital No. 74, Not Organized
- Camp Hospital No. 75, France, January 1919
- Camp Hospital No. 76, Camp Mills, New York, July 1919
- Camp Hospital No. 77, France, November 1918
- Camp Hospital No. 78, France, December 1918
- Camp Hospital No. 79, France, May 1919
- Camp Hospital No. 80, Not Organized
- Camp Hospital No. 81, Not Organized
- Camp Hospital No. 82, France, April 1919
- Camp Hospital No. 83, Not Organized
- Camp Hospital No. 84, Not Organized
- Camp Hospital No. 85, Camp Upton, New York, July 1919
- Camp Hospital No. 86, France, November 1918
- Camp Hospital No. 87, France, February 1919
- Camp Hospital No. 88, France, December 1918
- Camp Hospital No. 89, Not Organized
- Camp Hospital No. 90, Not Organized
- Camp Hospital No. 91, France, April 1919
- Camp Hospital No. 92, France, January 1919
- Camp Hospital No. 93, Camp Devens, Massachusetts, June 1919
- Camp Hospital No. 94, France, April 1919
- Camp Hospital No. 95, France, June 1919
- Camp Hospital No. 96, France, January 1919
- Camp Hospital No. 97, Camp Upton, New York, July 1919
- Camp Hospital No. 98, Not Organized
- Camp Hospital No. 99, Not Organized
- Camp Hospital No. 100, France, January 1919
- Camp Hospital No. 101, Camp Dix, New Jersey, July 1919
- Camp Hospital No. 102, France, May 1919
- Camp Hospital No. 103, Camp Dix, New Jersey, June 1919
- Camp Hospital No. 104, France, May 1919
- Camp Hospital No. 105, France, May 1919
- Camp Hospital No. 106, France, May 1919
- Camp Hospital No. 107, Camp Upton, New York, July 1919
- Camp Hospital No. 108, Camp Bowie, Texas, July 1919
- Camp Hospital No. 109, Camp Jackson, South Carolina, July 1919
- Camp Hospital No. 110, Camp Gordon, Georgia, July 1919
- Camp Hospital No. 111, Camp Upton, New York, June 1919
- Camp Hospital No. 112, Camp Gordon, Georgia, July 1919
- Camp Hospital No. 113, Not Organized
- Camp Hospital No. 114, Camp Upton, New York, July 1919
- Camp Hospital No. 115, Camp Dix, New Jersey, July 1919
- Camp Hospital No. 116, Not Organized
- Camp Hospital No. 117, France, June 1919
- Camp Hospital No. 118, France, August 1919
- Camp Hospital No. 119, Camp Devens, Massachusetts, July 1919
- Camp Hospital No. 120, Camp Gordon, Georgia, July 1919
- Camp Hospital No. 121, Consolidated with American Red Cross Military Hospital No. 3, June 1919
- Camp Hospital No. 122, Camp Devens, Massachusetts, August 1919

== Convalescent hospitals/centers ==
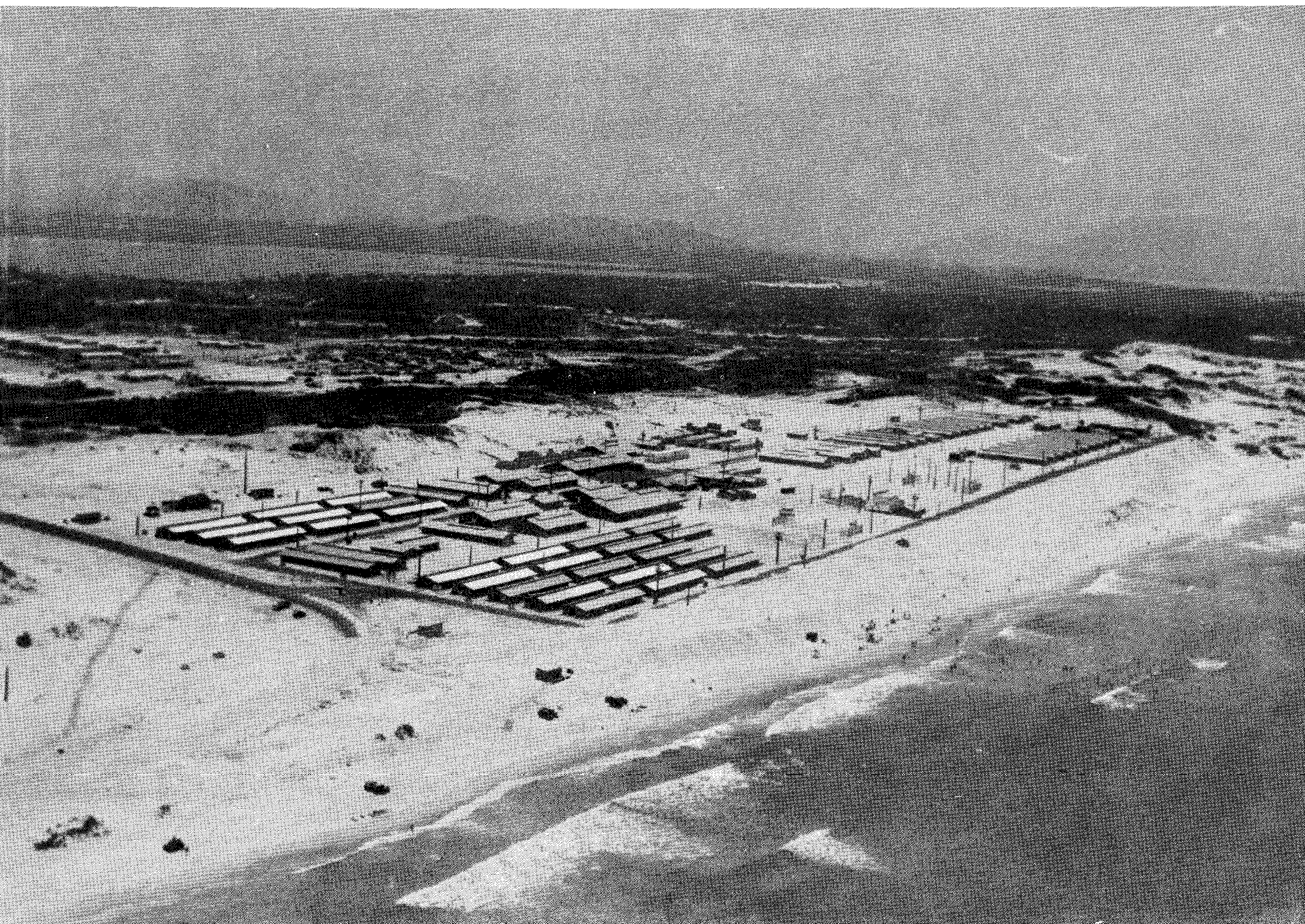
6th Convalescent Center, Cam Ranh Bay

- 2nd Convalescent Hospital
- 3rd Convalescent Hospital, Italy, 8 September 1945
- 4th Convalescent Hospital (1945)
- 6th Convalescent Center
  - New York Port of Embarkation, 4 November 1945
  - Germany, 20 September 1958
  - Cam Rahn Bay, Republic of Vietnam, 30 October 1971
- 7th Convalescent Hospital (1945)
- 8th Convalescent Hospital

== Debarkation hospitals ==
World War I
This was a specific unit designation, much like a Combat Support, MASH, or Evacuation Hospital

- Debarkation Hospital No. 1, Ellis Island, New York, June 1919
- Debarkation Hospital No. 2, Fox Hills, Staten Island, New York, See General Hospital No. 41
- Debarkation Hospital No. 3, Greenhut Building, New York, New York, July 1919
- Debarkation Hospital No. 4, Nassau Hotel, Long Beach, Long Island, New York, July 1919
- Debarkation Hospital No. 5, Grand Central Palace, New York, New York, June 1919
- Debarkation Hospital No. 51, Hampton, Virginia, See General Hospital No. 39
- Debarkation Hospital No. 52, Richmond College, Virginia, April 1919

== Embarkation hospitals ==
World War I This was a specific unit designation, much like a Combat Support, MASH, or Evacuation Hospital

- Embarkation Hospital No. 1, St. Mary's Hospital, Hoboken, New Jersey, October 1919
- Embarkation Hospital No. 2, Secaucus, New Jersey, February 1919
- Embarkation Hospital No. 3, Hoffman Island, New York Harbor, New York, August 1919
- Embarkation Hospital No. 4, Polyclinic Hospital, New York, New York, August 1919

== Field hospitals ==
=== World War I ===
- Field Hospital (non-divisional) Nos. 1-5 Not Organized
- Field Hospital (non-divisional) No. 6, January 1919
- Field Hospital (non-divisional) No. 7-9 Not Organized
- Field Hospital (non-divisional) No. 10, December 1919
- Field Hospital (non-divisional) No. 11-13 Not Organized
- Field Hospital (non-divisional) No. 14, January 1919
- Field Hospital (non-divisional) No. 15-17 Not Organized
- Field Hospital (non-divisional) No. 18, December 1918
- Field Hospital (non-divisional) No. 19-23 Not Organized
- Field Hospital (non-divisional) No. 24, July 1919
- Field Hospital (non-divisional) No. 25-38 Not Organized
- Field Hospital (non-divisional) No. 39, July 1919
- Field Hospital (non-divisional) No. 40, Not Organized
- Field Hospital (non-divisional) No. 41, April 1919
- Field Hospital (non-divisional) No. 42, April 1919
- Field Hospital (non-divisional) No. 43, Not Organized
- Field Hospital (non-divisional) No. 44, August 19919
- Field Hospital (non-divisional) No. 45-62 Not Organized
- Field Hospital (non-divisional) No. 63, December 1918
- Field Hospital (non-divisional) No. 64, December 1918
- Field Hospital (non-divisional) No. 65, December 1918
- Field Hospital (non-divisional) No. 66, December 1918

=== World War II and later ===
- 4th Field Hospital, Italy, 10 September 1945
- 9th Field Hospital, Fort Sam Houston, Texas, 25 March 1963
- 10th Field Hospital
  - Camp Miles Standish, Massachusetts, 4 November 1945
  - Reorganized and redesignated as the 10th Evacuation Hospital, 15 June 1962
- 11th Field Hospital
  - Camp Myles Standish, Massachusetts, 21 November 1945
  - Germany, reorganized and redesignated 21st Evacuation Hospital, 15 June 1962
- 14th Field Hospital
  - Germany, 25 March 1946
  - Korea, 1 February 1954
  - Germany, 15 April 1968
  - Fort Benning, Georgia, reorganized and redesignated 14th Combat Support Hospital, 17 October 2004
- 15th Field Hospital, Italy, 13 May 1946
- 19th Field Hospital, Iran
  - 1st & 2nd Platoons, 31 July 1945
  - 3rd Platoon, 8 September 1945
- 33rd Field Hospital, Italy, 25 September 1945
- 35th Field Hospital, Italy, 25 October 1945
- 42nd Field Hospital, Fort Knox, Kentucky
- 47th Field Hospital
  - Germany, 15 November 1945
  - Fort Sill, Oklahoma
- 51st Field Hospital

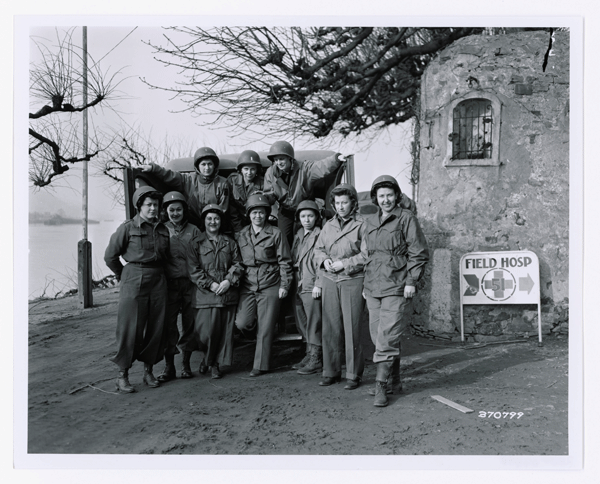
Photograph of the First Army Nurses to Cross the Rhine River with the 51st U.S. Army Field Hospital

- 74th Field Hospital Bronx, New York / Orangeburg, New York (US Army Reserve) (First USAR Hospital mobilized for service in Vietnam)
- 92nd Field Hospital, Japan, 28 February 1946
- 99th Field Hospital, Italy, 1 May 1946
- 115th Field Hospital, Fort Polk, Louisiana, reorganized and redesignated as the 115th Combat Support Hospital, 16 October 2005
- 131st Field Hospital, Fort Bliss, Texas, reorganized and redesignated as the 31st Combat Support Hospital, 16 February 1996
- 301st Field Hospital, La Chapelle-Saint-Mesmin, France
- 325th Field Hospital, reorganized and redesignated as the 325th Combat Support Hospital, 1 October 2006

== Gas hospitals ==
=== World War I ===
This was a specific unit designation, much like a Combat Support, MASH, or Evacuation Hospital

- Gas Hospital No. 1, France, November 1918
- Gas Hospital No. 2, France, November 1918
- Gas Hospital No. 3, France, November 1918
- Gas Hospital No. 4, France, November 1918

== Mobile Army Surgical Hospitals ==
The Army's official designation for the MASH is Surgical Hospital (Mobile) (Army). In official correspondence, troop lists, etc. they would often be referred to as the XXth Surgical Hospital through the end of the Vietnam War (and the start of the TV series M*A*S*H)

- 2nd Surgical Hospital, Lai Khe, Republic of Vietnam, March 10, 1970
- 3rd Surgical Hospital, Fort Lewis, Washington, 1972.
- 4th Surgical Hospital, Anniston Alabama 1974
- 5th Surgical Hospital, Fort Bragg, NC (~1997)
- 7th Surgical Hospital, Republic of Vietnam, July 10, 1970
- 10th Surgical Hospital, Fort Carson, Colorado, reorganized and redesignated as the 10th Combat Support Hospital, 16 December 1992
- 16th Surgical Hospital
  - Fort Devans, Massachusetts, 15 November 1957
  - Fort Riley, Kansas, Reorganized and Redesignated as 16th Combat Support Hospital, 21 March 1973
- 18th Surgical Hospital, Quang Tri, Republic of Vietnam, August 30, 1971
- 22nd Surgical Hospital, Phu Bai, Republic of Vietnam, October 18, 1969
- 27th Surgical Hospital, Chu Lai, Republic of Vietnam, June 13, 1971
- 28th Surgical Hospital, Fort Bragg, North Carolina, reorganized and redesignated as the 28th Combat Support Hospital, 21 December 1972
- 31st Surgical Hospital, Germany, reorganized and redesignated as the 31st Combat Support Hospital, 21 November 1973
- 41st Surgical Hospital, Fort Sam Houston, Texas, reorganized and redesignated as the 41st Combat Support Hospital, 26 June 1972
- 44th Surgical Hospital, AKA 8063rd Mobile Army Surgical Hospital.
- 45th Surgical Hospital
  - 1 October 1954 in Korea
  - Republic of Vietnam, December 10, 1970
- 46th Surgical Hospital, Korea, (1951?-1954)
- 47th Surgical Hospital
  - Fort Riley, Kansas, 15 November 1953
  - Fort Lewis, Washington, reorganized and redesignated as the 47th Combat Support Hospital, 21 May 1973
- 48th Surgical Hospital, reorganized and redesignated as the 128th Evacuation Hospital, 1 May 1943
- 61st Surgical Hospital, Fort Meade, Maryland, reorganized and redesignated as the 93rd Evacuation Hospital, 19 August 1942
- 116th Surgical Hospital, Delaware Army National Guard, Wilmington, DE
- 131st Surgical Hospital, Florida Army National Guard Temple Terrace, FL
- 135th Surgical Hospital, Missouri Army National Guard, Kansas City, MO 1995
- 159th Surgical Hospital, Louisiana Army National Guard, New Orleans, LA
- 212th Surgical Hospital, Germany, reorganized and redesignated as the 212th Combat Support Hospital, 16 October 2006
- 914th Surgical Hospital
  - Dublin, Georgia, 1 February 1951
  - Redesignated 17 September 1993 as the 934th Combat Support Hospital
- 8076th Surgical Hospital

== Mobile hospitals ==
=== World War I ===
This was a specific unit designation, much like a Combat Support, MASH, or Evacuation Hospital

- Mobile Hospital No. 1, May 1919 in the United States
- Mobile Hospital No. 2, December 1918 in France
- Mobile Hospital No. 3, June 1919 in France
- Mobile Hospital No. 4, January 1919 in France
- Mobile Hospital No. 5, January 1919 in France
- Mobile Hospital No. 6, January 1919 in France
- Mobile Hospital No. 7, June 1919 in the United States
- Mobile Hospital No. 8, January 1919 in France
- Mobile Hospital No. 9, April 1919 in France
- Mobile Hospital No. 10, June 1919 in the United States
- Mobile Hospital No. 11, June 1919 in the United States
- Mobile Hospital No. 12, April 1919 in France
- Mobile Hospitals Number 13 through 38 Never Organized
- Mobile Hospital No. 39, See Base Hospital 39
- Mobile Hospitals Number 40 through 99 Never Organized
- Mobile Hospital No. 100, March 1919
- Mobile Hospital No. 101, March 1919
- Mobile Hospital No. 102, March 1919
- Mobile Hospital No. 103, March 1919
- Mobile Hospital No. 104, March 1919
- Mobile Hospital No. 105, March 1919
- Mobile Hospital No. 106, December 1918
- Mobile Hospital No. 107, December 1918
- Mobile Hospital No. 108, January 1919
- Mobile Hospital No. 109, December 1918

== Portable Surgical Hospitals ==
- 1st Portable Surgical Hospital, End of World War II Pacific Theater
- 2nd Portable Surgical Hospital, End of World War II Pacific Theater
- 3rd Portable Surgical Hospital, Manila, Philippine Islands, 11 December 1945
- 4th Portable Surgical Hospital, End of World War II Pacific Theater
- 5th Portable Surgical Hospital, End of World War II Pacific Theater
- 6th Portable Surgical Hospital, End of World War II Pacific Theater
- 7th Portable Surgical Hospital, End of World War II Pacific Theater
- 8th Portable Surgical Hospital, End of World War II Pacific Theater
- 9th Portable Surgical Hospital, End of World War II Pacific Theater
- 10th Portable Surgical Hospital, End of World War II Pacific Theater
- 11th Portable Surgical Hospital, End of World War II Pacific Theater
- 12th Portable Surgical Hospital, End of World War II Pacific Theater
- 13th Portable Surgical Hospital, End of World War II Pacific Theater
- 14th Portable Surgical Hospital, End of World War II Pacific Theater
- 15th Portable Surgical Hospital, End of World War II Pacific Theater
- 16th Portable Surgical Hospital
  - 31 December 1945, Philippines
  - Redesignated as the 16th Surgical Hospital 1 February 1955 and reactivated 18 March 1955 at Fort Devens, Massachusetts
- 17th Portable Surgical Hospital, End of World War II Pacific Theater
- 18th Portable Surgical Hospital
  - Japan, 1 December 1945
  - Redesignated 1 March 1963 as the 18th Surgical Hospital
- 19th Portable Surgical Hospital, End of World War II Pacific Theater
- 20th Portable Surgical Hospital, End of World War II Pacific Theater
- 21st Portable Surgical Hospital, End of World War II Pacific Theater
- 22nd Portable Surgical Hospital, End of World War II Pacific Theater
- 23rd Portable Surgical Hospital, End of World War II Pacific Theater
- 24th Portable Surgical Hospital, End of World War II Pacific Theater
- 27th Portable Surgical Hospital, End of World War II Pacific Theater
- 28th Portable Surgical Hospital
  - India, 20 December 1945
  - Redesignated as the 28th Surgical Hospital, 18 April 1967
- 30th Portable Surgical Hospital
  - Japan, 31 October 1945
  - Redesignated as the 228th Combat Support Hospital, 1 August 1996
- 31st Portable Surgical Hospital
  - Lingayen, Philippines, 5 November 1945
  - Redesignated as the 31st Surgical Hospital (Mobile) (Army), 16 February 1951
- 32nd Portable Surgical Hospital, India, 23 December 1945
- 33rd Portable Surgical Hospital, End of World War II Pacific Theater
- 34th Portable Surgical Hospital, End of World War II Pacific Theater
- 35th Portable Surgical Hospital, End of World War II Pacific Theater
- 36th Portable Surgical Hospital, End of World War II Pacific Theater
- 38th Portable Surgical Hospital, End of World War II Pacific Theater
- 40th Portable Surgical Hospital, End of World War II Pacific Theater
- 41st Portable Surgical Hospital
  - Philippine Islands, 31 October 1945
  - Redesignated as the 41st Surgical Hospital, 28 November 1967
- 44th Portable Surgical Hospital Portable Surgical Hospital, End of World War II Pacific Theater
- 45th Portable Surgical Hospital
  - Shanghai, China, 13 December 1945
  - Redesignated as the 45 Surgical Hospital, 24 November 1952 and activated 2 February 1953 in Korea
- 46th Portable Surgical Hospital, End of World War II Pacific Theater
- 47th Portable Surgical Hospital
  - Camp Kilmer, New Jersey, 3 November 1945
  - Redesignated as the 47th Surgical Hospital, 24 November 1952
- 48th Portable Surgical Hospital, End of World War II Pacific Theater
- 49th Portable Surgical Hospital, End of World War II Pacific Theater
- 50th Portable Surgical Hospital, End of World War II Pacific Theater
- 51st Portable Surgical Hospital, End of World War II Pacific Theater
- 52nd Portable Surgical Hospital, End of World War II Pacific Theater
- 53rd Portable Surgical Hospital, End of World War II Pacific Theater
- 54th Portable Surgical Hospital
  - Camp Stoneman, California 25 February 1948
  - Redesignated 5 October 1948 as the 914th Surgical Hospital
- 56th Portable Surgical Hospital, End of World War II Pacific Theater
- 57th Portable Surgical Hospital, End of World War II Pacific Theater
- 58th Portable Surgical Hospital, End of World War II Pacific Theater
- 60th Portable Surgical Hospital, End of World War II Pacific Theater
- 61st Portable Surgical Hospital, End of World War II Pacific Theater
- 62nd Portable Surgical Hospital, End of World War II Pacific Theater
- 63rd Portable Surgical Hospital, End of World War II Pacific Theater
- 64th Portable Surgical Hospital, End of World War II Pacific Theater
- 66th Portable Surgical Hospital, End of World War II Pacific Theater
- 67th Portable Surgical Hospital, End of World War II Pacific Theater
- 95th Portable Surgical Hospital, End of World War II Pacific Theater
- 96th Portable Surgical Hospital, End of World War II Pacific Theater
- 97th Portable Surgical Hospital, End of World War II Pacific Theater
- 98th Portable Surgical Hospital, End of World War II Pacific Theater

== Station hospitals ==
- 7th Station Hospital
  - Italy, 15 September 1945
  - (Reactivated 1 May 1947)
- 9th Station Hospital, Salzburg, Austria (1949-1951)
- 11th Station Hospital, Iceland, Combined with 72nd Station Hospital and combined unit redesignated 366th Station Hospital, 6 December 1943
- 14th Station Hospital, Iceland, Combined with 15th and 167th Station Hospitals and combined unit redesignated 365th Station Hospital, 6 December 1943
- 15th Station Hospital, Iceland, Combined with 14th and 167th Station Hospitals and combined unit redesignated 365th Station Hospital, 6 December 1943
- 19th Station Hospital, Iran, 27 December 1945
- 20th Station Hospital, Nurnberg, Germany (1961-1967)
- 25th Station Hospital, Roberts Field, Liberia, 15 February 1946
- 28th Station Hospital
  - Camp Kilmer, New Jersey, 2 January 1946
  - Redesignated 4 September 1947 as the 801st Station Hospital
- 29th Station Hospital, Algiers, Algeria, reorganized and redesignated 170th Evacuation Hospital, 5 November 1944
- 33rd Station Hospital, Fontainebleau, France
- 34th Station Hospital, Italy, 9 October 1947
- 43rd Station Hospital, Italy, 5 June 1944
- 50th Station Hospital, Italy, reorganized and redesignated 99th Field Hospital, 20 March 1945
- 53rd Station Hospital
  - Inactivated 5 June 1944
  - (Reactivated 16 August 1945)
  - Inactivated 10 December 1945
- 54th Station Hospital, Oran, Algeria, reorganized and redesignated as the 171st Evacuation Hospital 20 March 1945
- 55th Station Hospital, Italy, 22 April 1947
- 56th Station Hospital, Heliopolis, Egypt, inactivated 15 March 1946 but closed in May 1946
- 57th Station Hospital, redesignated 247th Medical Detachment 1 March 1945
- 58th Station Hospital, Caserta, Italy, 5 June 1944
- 60th Station Hospital, Chinon, France
- 61st Station Hospital, Leghorn, Italy, 15 November 1947
- 64th Station Hospital, Dugenta, Italy, 5 June 1944
- 67th Station Hospital, Accra, Gold Coast, 31 July 1945
- 72nd Station Hospital, Kaldadharnes, Iceland, Combined with 11th Station Hospital and Redesignated 366th Station Hospital 6 December 1943
- 75th Station Hospital, Bad Cannstatt, Germany
- 79th Station Hospital, Algiers, Algeria, 24 August 1944
- 92nd Station Hospital, Keflavik, Iceland, 1 January 1946
- 93rd Station Hospital, Tripoli, 28 October 1945
- 104th Station Hospital, Khartoum, Sudan, disbanded 31 July 1945
- 110th Station Hospital, Vienna, Austria
- 113th Station Hospital, Ahwaz, Iran, redesignated 113th General Hospital, 7 September 1943
- 124th Station Hospital, Linz, Austria
- 130th Station Hospital, Heidelberg, Germany 15 November 1994
- 151st Station Hospital, La Senia, Algeria, 5 June 1944
- 154th Station Hospital, Italy, 1 October 1945
- 167th Station Hospital, Iceland, Combined with 14th and 15th Station Hospitals and Redesignated 365th Station Hospital 6 December 1943
- 172nd Station Hospital, Indooroopilly, Brisbane Queensland Australia, 1942 to 1945
- 175th Station Hospital, Ascension Island, 30 September 1945
- 188th Station Hospital, Narsarssuak, Greenland, 31 December 1945
- 189th Station Hospital, Ivigtut, Greenland, 11 December 1944
- 190th Station Hospital, Greenland, 30 September 1945
- 191st Station Hospital, Angmagssalik, Greenland, disbanded 10 July 1945
- 192nd Station Hospital, Iceland, 24 June 1943
- 193rd Station Hospital, Belem, Brazil, 30 September 1945
- 194th Station Hospital, Natal, Brazil, 5 October 1945
- 196th Station Hospital, Paris, France (1955-?)
- 200th Station Hospital, Recife, Brazil, 12 October 1945
- 221st Station Hospital, Fort Bell, Hamilton Parish, Bermuda, 1 January 1946
- 255th Station Hospital, Port-of-Spain, Trinidad, disbanded 1 May 1944
- 256th Station Hospital, Iran, 10 December 1945
- 279th Station Hospital, Berlin, Germany (1989)
- 292nd Station Hospital, Aversa, Italy, 15 January 1947
- 293rd Station Hospital, Fort Byham—Coolidge Field, Antigua, disbanded 1 November 1944
- 294th Station Hospital, St. Thomas, Virgin Islands, disbanded 1 April 1944
- 295th Station Hospital, Henry Barracks, Puerto Rico, disbanded 1 April 1944
- 296th Station Hospital, Camp Tortuguero, Puerto Rico, 3 June 1946
- 297th Station Hospital, Fort Buchanan, Puerto Rico, disbanded 1 May 1944
- 298th Station Hospital, San Juan, Puerto Rico, redesignated 161st General Hospital, 1 June 1944
- 299th Station Hospital, San Julian, Cuba, redesignated 299th Medical Dispensary, 3 June 1946
- 300th Station Hospital, Batista Field, Cuba, 1 February 1947
- 308th Station Hospital, Fort Pepperrell, St. John's, Newfoundland, 1 January 1946
- 309th Station Hospital, Fort McAndrew, Argentia, Newfoundland, disbanded 8 September 1945
- 319th Station Hospital, Bremerhaven, Germany
- 326th Station Hospital, Camp O'Reilly, Gurabo, Puerto Rico, 27 March 1950
- 330th Station Hospital, Borinquen Field, Puerto Rico, 31 March 1949
- 333rd Station Hospital, Fort Clayton, Canal Zone, redesignated 262nd General Hospital 1 April 1944
- 348th Station Hospital, Bremerhaven, Germany (1945-1969)
- 352nd Station Hospital, Zanderij Field, Surinam, 3 June 1946
- 353rd Station Hospital, Atkinson Field, British Guiana, 15 January 1947
- 354th Station Hospital, Paramaribo, Surinam, disbanded 1 November 1944
- 355th Station Hospital, Vieux Fort, Saint Lucia, disbanded 1 November 1944
- 356th Station Hospital, Camp Suffisant, Curaçao, disbanded 22 August 1945
- 358th Station Hospital, Camp Savaneta, Aruba, disbanded 22 August 1945
- 359th Station Hospital, Fort Read, Trinidad, 31 March 1947
- 366th Station Hospital, Reykjavík, Iceland, 23 March 1945
- 367th Station Hospital, reorganized and redesignated 338th Medical Detachment, 1 January 1946
- 368th Station Hospital, Fort Gullickson, Canal Zone, 22 November 1948
- 370th Station Hospital, Marrakesh, French Morocco, 25 October 1945
- 373rd Station Hospital, reorganized and redesignated 373rd General Hospital 5 June 1945
- 384th Station Hospital, Casablanca, French Morocco, 10 March 1946
- 385th Station Hospital, Nuremberg, Germany (1946-1949)
- 387th Station Hospital, Bad Cannstatt, Germany
- 391st Station Hospital, Udine, Italy, 15 October 1947
- 392nd Station Hospital, Naples, Italy, 15 January 1947
- 801st Station Hospital, Fort Sheridan, Illinois, reorganized and redesignated as the 801st Combat Support Hospital, 1 September 1995

== Army Reserve expansion hospitals ==
- 1125th U.S. Army Hospital at Auburn, Maine, supporting Fort Devens, Massachusetts (2014)
- 1207th U.S. Army Hospital at Fort Benning, Georgia (2014)
- 1208th U.S. Army Hospital at Fort Hamilton, New York, supporting Patterson Army Hospital, Fort Monmouth, New Jersey (2014)
- 2289th U.S. Army Hospital at Wilmington, Delaware, supporting Walson Army Hospital, Fort Dix, New Jersey (2014)
- 2290th U.S. Army Hospital at Walter Reed Army Medical Center, Washington, DC (2014)
- 2291st U.S. Army Hospital at Fort Lee, Virginia (2014)
- 3270th U.S. Army Hospital at Fort Jackson, South Carolina (2014)
- 3271st U.S. Army Hospital at Fort Stewart, Georgia (2014)
- 3273rd U.S. Army Hospital at Fort Campbell, Kentucky (2014)
- 3297th U.S. Army Hospital at Fort Gordon, Georgia (2014)
- 3274th U.S. Army Hospital at Fort Bragg, North Carolina (2014)
- 3343rd U.S. Army Hospital at Mobile, Alabama supporting Redstone Arsenal (2014)
- 3344th U.S. Army Hospital at Tampa, Florida, supporting Fort Rucker, Alabama (2014)
- 3345th U.S. Army Hospital at Birmingham, Alabama, supporting Fort McClellan (2014)
- 4005th U.S. Army Hospital at Fort Hood, Texas (2014)
- 4010th U.S. Army Hospital at New Orleans, Louisiana, supporting Bayne-Jones Army Community Hospital, Fort Polk, Louisiana (2014)
- 5010th U.S. Army Hospital at Louisville, Kentucky then at Fort Gordon, Georgia (2014)
- 5501st U.S. Army Hospital at Fort Snelling, Minnesota, then at Fort Sam Houston, Texas (2014)
- 5502nd U.S. Army Hospital at Aurora, Colorado (2014)
- 5503rd U.S. Army Hospital at Columbia, Missouri (2014)
- 6250th U.S. Army Hospital at Fort Lewis, Washington (2014)
- 6251st U.S. Army Hospital at Tucson, Arizona (2014)
- 6252nd U.S. Army Hospital at Fort Ord, California (2014)
- 6253rd U.S. Army Hospital at Fort Carson, Colorado (2014)

The United States Army Reserve maintained these Table of Distribution and Allowances (TDA) hospitals, designed to augment 'existing Army hospitals' in the event of war. In 2014 all of these hospitals were inactivated and replaced by USAR Medical Backfill Battalions as part of the Total Army Analysis 15–19.

== Medical commands ==
- United States Army Medical Command, Vietnam, Long Binh Post, Republic of Vietnam, 30 April 1972
- United States Army Medical Command, Europe, Heidelberg, Germany, 21 September 1978
- 7th Medical Command, Heidelberg, Germany, 15 October 1994
- 30th Medical Command, reorganized and redesignated as the 30th Medical Brigade
- 44th Medical Command, reorganized and redesignated as the 44th Medical Brigade, 21 April 2010

== Medical brigades ==
- 7th Medical Brigade, 21 July 1973 in Germany
- 18th Medical Brigade
  - Fort Meade, Maryland, 16 December 1970
  - Reorganized and redesignated 16 August 1984, as the 18th Medical Command
- 44th Medical Brigade
  - Fort Meade, Maryland, 19 March 1973
  - Reorganized and redesignated 16 October 2001, as the 44th Medical Command
  - (44th Medical Command again reorganized and redesignated as the 44th Medical Brigade, 21 April 2010)
- 112th Medical Brigade, Ohio National Guard (1996)
- 213th Medical Brigade, Mississippi National Guard, consolidated with the 134th Combat Support Hospital on 1 September 1995, with consolidated organization flagged as the 134th Combat Support Hospital
- 807th Medical Brigade, reorganized and redesignated 807th Medical Command, 17 September 2002

== Hospital centers ==
Named Hospital Centers, American Expeditionary Force

- Hospital Center, Allerey, France, March 1919
- Hospital Center, Basoilles, France, May 1919
- Hospital Center, Beau Desert, France, June 1919
- Hospital Center, Beaune, France, March 1919
- Hospital Center, Clermont-Ferrand, France,
- Hospital Center, Commercy, France, January 1919
- Hospital Center, Joue-les-Tours, France, June 1919
- Hospital Center, Kerhuon, France, July 1919
- Hospital Center, Langres, France, January 1919
- Hospital Center, Limoges, France, February 1919
- Hospital Center, Mars-sur-Allier, France, May 1919
- Hospital Center, Mesves, France, May 1919
- Hospital Center, Nantes, France, May 1919
- Hospital Center, Pau, France, December 1918
- Hospital Center, Perigueux, France, May 1919
- Hospital Center, Rimaucourt, France, May 1919
- Hospital Center, Riviera, France, June 1919
- Hospital Center, Savenay, France, July 1919
- Hospital Center, Toul, France, May 1919
- Hospital Center, Vannes, France, June 1919
- Hospital Center, Vichy, France, April 1919
- Hospital Center, Vittel-Contrexeville, France, January 1919

=== Numbered hospital centers ===
- I Hospital Group (Provisional), Taunton, Somerset, United Kingdom, assets used to form the 801st Hospital Center
- II Hospital Group (Provisional), Blandford, Dorset, United Kingdom, assets used to form the 802nd Hospital Center
- III Hospital Group (Provisional), Chippenham, Wiltshire, United Kingdom, assets used to form the 803rd Hospital Center
- IV Hospital Group (Provisional), Cirencester, Gloucestershire, United Kingdom, assets used to form the 15th Hospital Center
- V Hospital Group (Provisional), Great Malvern, Worcestershire, United Kingdom, assets used to form the 12th Hospital Center, March 1944
- VI Hospital Group (Provisional), Whitchurch, Flintshire, United Kingdom, assets used to form the 804th Hospital Center
- VII Hospital Group (Provisional), Newmarket, Cambshire, United Kingdom, assets used to form the 805th Hospital Center
- 2nd Hospital Center, reorganized and redesignated as 2nd Medical Brigade, 17 September 1992
- 9th Hospital Center,
- 12th Hospital Center
- 15th Hospital Center
- 26th Hospital Center End of World War II
- 27th Hospital Center End of World War II
- 28th Hospital Center End of World War II
- 30th Hospital Center
  - Philippine Islands, 25 January 1946
  - Atlanta, Georgia, 31 March 1963
  - Reorganized and redesignated 330th Medical Brigade, 16 April 1993
- 549th Hospital Center, Rohrbach, Germany, 14 December 1962
- 801st Hospital Center
- 802nd Hospital Center
- 803rd Hospital Center
- 804th Hospital Center
  - England, January 1946
  - Reorganized and redesignated as 804th Medical Brigade, 16 September 1993
- 805th Hospital Center
- 807th Hospital Center
  - Camp Sibert, Alabama, 27 October 1945
  - Oklahoma City, Oklahoma, 1 December 1950
  - Reorganized and redesignated as 807th Medical Brigade, 1 October 1976
- 808th Hospital Center
- 809th Hospital Center
- 810th Hospital Center
- 811th Hospital Center
- 812th Hospital Center
- 813th Hospital Center
- 814th Hospital Center
- 815th Hospital Center
- 816th Hospital Center
- 817th Hospital Center
- 818th Hospital Center
  - Belgium, 31 January 1946
  - Reorganized and redesignated as 818th Medical Brigade, 17 September 1992
- 819th Hospital Center, Harbord Barracks, Orleans, France
- 820th Hospital Center
- 821st Hospital Center End of World War II
- 6810th Hospital Center (Provisional), Whitchurch, Flintshire, United Kingdom, assets used to form the 804th Hospital Center, June 1944
- Manila Hospital Center, Philippines, January 1942

== Medical groups ==
- 1st Medical Group
  - Fort Benning, Georgia, 12 November 1945
  - Verdun, France, 24 March 1962
  - Reorganized and redesignated as 1st Medical Brigade, Fort Hood, Texas, 6 June 2000
- 30th Medical Group
  - Fort Benning Georgia, 6 June 1949
  - Reorganized and redesignated as 30th Medical Brigade, 17 June 1993
- 31st Medical Group
- 39th Medical Group
  - Fort Devens, Massachusetts, September 1958
  - Fort Bragg, North Carolina, 25 March 1971
- 43rd Medical Group, Nha Trang, Republic of Vietnam, 7 February 1970.
- 55th Medical Group
  - Republic of Vietnam, 25 June 1970 The Group Headquarters had actually been reduced to zero strength on June 15, 1969.
  - Fort Bragg, North Carolina, 21 September 1974
  - Fort Bragg, North Carolina, April 21, 2010
- 62nd Medical Group, Fort Lewis, Washington, reorganized and redesignated 62nd Medical Brigade, 16 October 2001
- 64th Medical Group
  - (1945)
  - (1955-?)
- 65th Medical Group
  - Germany, 31 January 1946
  - Fort Lewis, Washington, 21 June 1971
- 67th Medical Group
  - 20 November 1945 at Camp Kilmer, New Jersey
  - 20 January 1972 at Fort Lewis, Washington
- 68th Medical Group
  - 27 June 1946 in Germany
  - 30 June 1972 at Fort Lewis, Washington
  - 15 December 1994 in Germany
- 69th Medical Group
  - Fort Bragg, North Carolina, 1 November 1945
  - Reorganized and redesignated 332nd Medical Group, 5 October 1948
- 80th Medical Group, End of World War II
- 112th Medical Group, reorganized and redesignated as 112th Medical Brigade, 1 July 1975
- 133rd Medical Group
- 135th Medical Group, End of World War II
- 175th Medical Group, California National Guard, reorganized and redesignated 1 January 1976 as 175th Medical Brigade
- 213th Medical Group, Mississippi National Guard, reorganized and redesignated 1 March 1975 as 213th Medical Brigade
- 332nd Medical Group
  - Fort Bragg, North Carolina, 1 November 1945
  - Reorganized and redesignated as 332nd Medical Brigade, 5 October 1948
- 338th Medical Group
  - Altoona, Pennsylvania, 28 April 1959
  - Reorganized and redesignated 338th Medical Brigade, 17 September 2002
- 426th Medical Group
  - Los Angeles, California, 1 January 1958
  - Reorganized and redesignated 426th Medical Brigade, 16 September 1993

== Sanitary trains ==
Sanitary Trains were the division-level medical support unit for divisions in the American Expeditionary Force

- 1st Sanitary Train, 1st Division, Carlisle Barracks, Pennsylvania, reorganized and redesignated as the 1st Medical Regiment, 1st Division, 10 February 1921
- 2nd Sanitary Train, 2nd Division, Camp Travis, Texas, reorganized and redesignated as the 2nd Medical Regiment, 17 February 1921
- 3rd Sanitary Train, 3rd Division, Camp Pike, Arkansas, reorganized and redesignated as the 3rd Medical Regiment, 18 February 1921
- 4th Sanitary Train, 4th Division, Camp Lewis, Washington, reorganized and redesignated as the 4th Medical Regiment, 12 February 1921
- 5th Sanitary Train, 5th Division, Camp Jackson, South Carolina, reorganized and redesignated as the 5th Medical Regiment, 11 February 1921
- 6th Sanitary Train, 6th Division, Camp Grant, Illinois, reorganized and redesignated as the 6th Medical Regiment, 28 February 1921
- 7th Sanitary Train, 7th Division, Camp Meade, Maryland, reorganized and redesignated as the 7th Medical Regiment, 15 February 1921
- 8th Sanitary Train, 8th Division
  - Camp Lee, Virginia, 15 February 1919
  - Reconstituted as the 8th Medical Battalion, 8th Division, 2 October 1939
- 9th Sanitary Train, 9th Division, Camp Sheridan, Alabama, February 1919
- 10th Sanitary Train, 10th Division, Camp Funston, Kansas, February 1919
- 11th Sanitary Train, 11th Division, Camp Meade, Maryland, February 1919
- 12th Sanitary Train, 12th Division, Camp Devens, Massachusetts, January 1919
- 13th Sanitary Train, 13th Division, Camp Lewis, Washington, March 1919
- 14th Sanitary Train, 14th Division, Camp Custer, Michigan, February 1919
- 15th Sanitary Train, 15th Division, Camp Logan, Texas, February 1919
- 16th Sanitary Train, 16th Division, Camp Kearny, California, February 1919
- 17th Sanitary Train was never organized
- 18th Sanitary Train, 18th Division, Camp Travis, Texas, February 1919
- 19th Sanitary Train, 19th Division, Camp Dodge, Iowa, January 1919
- 20th Sanitary Train, 20th Division, Camp Sevier, South Carolina, February 1919
- 21st through 100th Sanitary Trains were not organized
- 101st Sanitary Train, 26th Division, Camp Devens, Massachusetts, April 1919
- 102nd Sanitary Train, 27th Division, Camp Upton, New York, April 1919
- 103rd Sanitary Train, 28th Division, Camp Dix, New Jersey, 18 May 1919
- 104th Sanitary Train, 29th Division, Camp Meade, Maryland, June 1919
- 105th Sanitary Train, 30th Division, Camp Jackson, South Carolina, April 1919
- 106th Sanitary Train, 31st Division, Camp Gordon, Georgia, June 1919
- 107th Sanitary Train, 32nd Division, Camp Grant, Illinois, May 1919
- 108th Sanitary Train, 33rd Division, Camp Grant, Illinois, June 1919
- 109th Sanitary Train, 34th Division, Camp Grant, Illinois, February 1919
- 110th Sanitary Train, 35th Division, Camp Funston, Kansas, May 1919
- 111th Sanitary Train, 36th Division, Camp Bowie, Texas, June 1919
- 112th Sanitary Train, 37th Division
  - Camp Sherman, Ohio, 12 April 1919
  - Columbus, Ohio, reorganized and redesignated 112th Medical Regiment, 37th Division, 25 April 1921
- 113th Sanitary Train, 38th Division, Camp Zachary Taylor, Kentucky, February 1919
- 114th Sanitary Train, 39th Division, Cap Pike, Arkansas, July 1919
- 115th Sanitary Train, 40th Division, Presidio of San Francisco, California, May 1919
- 116th Sanitary Train, 41st Division, Camp Dodge, Iowa, May 1919
- 117th Sanitary Train, 42nd Division, Camp Custer, Michigan, May 1919
- 118th through 300th Sanitary Trains were not organized
- 301st Sanitary Train, 76th Division, Camp Devens, Massachusetts, June 1919
- 302nd Sanitary Train, 77th Division, Camp Upton, New York, May 1919
- 303rd Sanitary Train, 78th Division, Camp Dix, New Jersey, May 1919
- 304th Sanitary Train, 79th Division, Camp Dix, New Jersey, June 1919
- 305th Sanitary Train, 80th Division, Camp Dix, New Jersey, June 1919
- 306th Sanitary Train, 81st Division, Camp Jackson, South Carolina, June 1919
- 307th Sanitary Train, 82nd Division, Camp Dix, New Jersey, May 1919
- 308th Sanitary Train, 83rd Division, Camp Sherman, Ohio, February 1919
- 309th Sanitary Train, 84th Division, Camp Zachary Taylor, Kentucky, January 1919
- 310th Sanitary Train, 85th Division, Camp Custer, Michigan, April 1919
- 311th Sanitary Train, 86th Division
  - Skeletonized November 1918 in France
  - Camp Grant, Illinois, February 1919
- 312th Sanitary Train, 87th Division
  - Skeletonized December 1918 in France
  - Fort Dix, New Jersey, February 1919
- 313th Sanitary Train, 88th Division, Camp Dodge, Iowa, June 1919
- 314th Sanitary Train, 89th Division, Camp Dodge, Iowa, June 1919
- 315th Sanitary Train, 90th Division, Camp Bowie, Texas, June 1919
- 316th Sanitary Train, 91st Division, Camp Lewis, Washington, May 1919
- 317th Sanitary Train, 92nd Division, Camp Zachary Taylor, Kentucky, March 1919
- 318th and 319th Sanitary Trains were never organized
- 320th Sanitary Train, 95th Division, Camp Sherman, Ohio, December 1918
- 321st Sanitary Train, 96th Division, Camp Wadsworth, South Carolina, January 1919
- 322nd Sanitary Train, Camp Cody, New Mexico, December 1918

== Medical regiments ==
- 1st Medical Regiment, Camp Bend, Oregon, reorganized and redesignated as the 1st Medical Group, 1 September 1943
- 2nd Medical Regiment, Fort Sam Houston, Texas, reorganized and redesignated as the 2nd Medical Battalion 10 October 1939
- 3rd Medical Regiment
  - Camp Lewis, Washington, 31 October 1922
  - Letterman General Hospital, June 1930
  - Presidio of San Francisco, California, reorganized and redesignated as the 3rd Medical Battalion, 13 October 1939
- 4th Medical Regiment
  - Camp Lewis, Washington, 21 September 1921
  - Fort Benning, Georgia, reorganized and redesignated as the 4th Medical Battalion, 19 October 1939
- 5th Medical Regiment
  - Camp Jackson, South Carolina, 15 September 1921
  - Reorganized and redesignated as the 4th Medical Battalion, 1 July 1940
- 6th Medical Regiment
  - Camp Grant, Illinois, 24 September 1921
  - Reorganized and redesignated as the 7th Medical Battalion and assigned to the 7th Division, 1 July 1940
- 7th Medical Regiment
  - Camp Meade, Maryland, 10 September 1921
  - Reorganized and redesignated as the 7th Medical Battalion, 26 September 1939
- 15th Medical Regiment, reorganized and redesignated 65th Medical Regiment, 28 May 1941
- 16th Medical Regiment, disbanded 8 September 1943
- 30th Medical Regiment, reorganized and redesignated 30th Medical Group, 8 September 1943
- 65th Medical Regiment, reorganized and redesignated 65th Medical Group, 10 March 1944
- 67th Medical Regiment, reorganized and redesignated 67th Medical Group, 15 September 1943
- 69th Medical Regiment, reorganized and redesignated 69th Medical Group, 4 September 1943
- 112th Medical Regiment, 37th Infantry Division, reorganized and redesignated 112th Medical Battalion, 37th Infantry Division, 16 January 1942
- 134th Medical Regiment, Camp Upton, New York, reorganized and redesignated 134th Medical Group, 15 September 1943

== Medical battalions ==
- 1st Medical Battalion, 1st Infantry Division
  - Fort Riley Kansas, 15 May 1985
  - Reorganized and redesignated 201st Support Battalion, 1st Infantry Division
- 2nd Medical Battalion
  - Reorganized and redesignated 302nd Support Battalion, 2nd Infantry Division
- 3rd Medical Battalion
  - Reorganized and redesignated 203rd Support Battalion, 3rd Infantry Division
- 4th Medical Battalion
  - Reorganized and redesignated as the 5th Medical Battalion, 5th Infantry Division
  - Reorganized and redesignated as the 5th Support Battalion, 5th Infantry Division
- 5th Medical Battalion
  - Reorganized and redesignated as the 204th Support Battalion, 4th Infantry Division
- 6th Medical Battalion, reorganized and redesignated as the 7th Medical Battalion, 7th Division, 1 July 1940
- 7th Medical Battalion, reorganized and redesignated as the 6th Medical Battalion, 1 July 1940
- 8th Medical Battalion, 8th Division, redesignated 1st Medical Battalion, 1st Division, 1 July 1940
- 11th Medical Battalion, 11th Air Assault Division, Fort Benning, Georgia, 1 July 1965
- 12th Medical Battalion, End of World War II
- 13th Medical Battalion, End of World War II
- 15th Medical Battalion, reorganized and redesignated as the 2d Forward Support Battalion, 1st Cavalry Division, 1 October 1984
- 23rd Medical Battalion, Americal Division, Fort Lewis, Washington, November 1971
- 26th Medical Battalion, Fort Buchanan, Puerto Rico, inactivated 1 September 1943; Disbanded 11 November 1944
- 28th Medical Battalion, 28th Infantry Division, Camp Shelby. Mississippi, 27 October 1945
- 32nd Medical Battalion
  - Fort Sam Houston, Texas, 30 April 1948
  - Redesignated 132nd Medical Battalion, 1992
- 46th Medical Battalion, 4th Armored Division, Continental United States, May 1945
- 47th Medical Battalion, 1st Armored Division
  - Camp Kilmer, New Jersey, 10 April 1946
  - Fort Polk, Louisiana, 23 December 1957
  - Reorganized and redesignated as the 47th Support Battalion, 1st Armored Division
  - Germany, 15 September 1985
- 51st Medical Battalion, Italy, 30 September 1945
- 53rd Medical Battalion, Germany, reduced to zero strength18 December 1945
- 54th Medical Battalion, Italy, 8 September 1945
- 55th Medical Battalion
  - Germany, 3 March 1946
  - Reorganized and redesignated 55th Medical Group, 20 December 1956
- 59th Medical Battalion, End of World War II
- 61st Medical Battalion
  - France, 12 November 1945
  - Fort Lewis, Washington, 18 February 1972
- 62nd Medical Battalion, 13 November 1945
- 70th Medical Battalion, End of World War II
- 71st Medical Battalion, End of World War II
- 85th Medical Battalion, Germany, 31 January 1946
- 87th Medical Battalion, Fort Riley, Kansas, 15 May 1970
- 95th Medical Battalion, End of World War II
- 106th Medical Battalion, 31st Infantry Division, reorganized and redesignated 213th Medical Group, 1 February 1972
- 112th Medical Battalion, Columbus, Ohio, reorganized and redesignated 112th Medical Group, 1 May 1973
- 118th Medical Battalion, 43rd Infantry Division, Camp Stoneman, California, 14 October 1945
- 120th Medical Battalion, 45th Infantry Division, Camp Bowie, Texas, 17–24 November 1945
- 132nd Medical Battalion Redesignated 32nd Medical Brigade, 1 October 2002
- 135th Medical Battalion, End of World War II
- 151st Medical Battalion, End of World War II
- 168th Medical Battalion
  - Camp Shanks, New York, 30 October 1945
  - Fort Lewis, Washington, 21 June 1971
- 180th Medical Battalion, Camp Miles Standish, Massachusetts, 23 November 1945
- 232nd Medical Composite Battalion, Italy, 12 May 1946
- 261st Medical Battalion, France, 28 January 1945
- 313th Medical Battalion, 88th Infantry Division, Italy, 15 May 1947
- 414th Medical Battalion, Indianapolis, Indiana, 3 April 1953
- 422nd Medical Battalion, Albany, New York, 31 July 1950
- 436th Medical Battalion
  - Camp Myles Standish, Massachusetts, 23 November 1945
  - Greenville, Texas, 15 December 1950
- 439th Medical Battalion, Millington, Tennessee, 15 June 1999

== Auxiliary surgical groups ==
- 1st Auxiliary Surgical Group
- 2nd Auxiliary Surgical Group, 14 September 1945
- 3rd Auxiliary Surgical Group
  - Germany, 6 October 1945
  - Redesignated 3rd Medical Command, 16 March 1991
- 4th Auxiliary Surgical Group
  - Germany, 28 September 1945
  - Redesignated 4th Medical Brigade 17 July 1988
- 5th Auxiliary Surgical Group
  - Camp Silbert, Alabama, 13 November 1945
  - Redesignated 5th Medical Group, 20 April 1953

== Air ambulance units ==
=== Air Ambulance Companies ===
- 45th Medical Company (Air Ambulance), Germany
- 54th medical company (air Ambulance) Ft. Lewis
- 57th Medical Company (Air Ambulance), Fort Bragg, North Carolina, January 2007
- 498th Medical Company (Air Ambulance), at Fort Benning, Georgia

=== Helicopter Ambulance Detachments ===
- 54th Medical Detachment (Helicopter Ambulance), reorganized and redesignated as the 54th Medical Company (Air Ambulance), 16 November 1992

== Medical hospital ship companies ==
- 200th Medical Hospital Ship Company, US Army Hospital Ship Louis A. Milne, 22 August 1946
- 201st Medical Hospital SHip Company, US Army Hospital Ship Seminole
- 202nd Medical Hospital Ship Company, US Army Hospital Ship Shamrock, 18 December 1945
- 203rd Medical Hospital Ship Company, US Army Hospital Ship Algonquin, 11 January 1946
- 204th Medical Hospital Ship Company, US Army Hospital Ship Acadia, 11 February 1946
- 206th Medical Hospital Ship Company, US Army Hospital Ship Thistle, 29 January 1946
- 208th Medical Hospital Ship Company, US Army Hospital Ship Château Thierry, 11 February 1946
- 209th Medical Hospital Ship Company, US Army Hospital Ship Larkspur, 11 February 1946
- 211th Medical Hospital Ship Company, US Army Hospital Ship Emily H. M. Weder, 18 December 1945
- 212th Medical Hospital Ship Company, US Army Hospital Ship Marigold, 25 January 1946
- 217th Medical Hospital Ship Company, US Army Hospital Ship St. Olaf, 28 December 1945
- 218th Medical Hospital Ship Company, US Army Hospital Ship Dogwood, 25 January 1946
- 219th Medical Hospital Ship Company, US Army Hospital Ship Wisteria, 22 July 1946
- 220th Medical Hospital Ship Company, US Army Hospital Ship Blanche F. Sigman, 24 May 1946
- 234th Medical Hospital Ship Company, US Army Hospital Ship Republic, at sea, 11 February 1946
- 235th Medical Hospital Ship Company, US Army Hospital Ship Frances Y. Slanger, 7 January 1946
- US Army Hospital Ship Ernest Hinds, 17 October 1945
- US Army Hospital Ship John L. Clem, 17 October 1945
- US Army Hospital Ship Seminole, 7 January 1946
- US Army Hospital Ship Jarrett M. Huddleston, 7 January 1946
- US Army Hospital Ship John J. Meany, 25 January 1946
- US Army Hospital Ship St. Mihiel, 21 March 1946
- US Army Hospital Ship Aleda E. Lutz, 6 April 1946
- US Army Hospital Ship Earnestine Kornada, 9 October 1946
- US Army Hospital Ship Charles A. Stafford, 2 November 1946

== Medical hospital ship platoons ==
- 1st Medical Hospital Ship Platoon
- 2nd Medical Hospital Ship Platoon
- 3rd Medical Hospital Ship Platoon
- 4th Medical Hospital Ship Platoon
- 5th Medical Hospital Ship Platoon
- 6th Medical Hospital Ship Platoon
- 7th Medical Hospital Ship Platoon
- 8th Medical Hospital Ship Platoon
- 9th Medical Hospital Ship Platoon
- 10th Medical Hospital Ship Platoon
- 11th Medical Hospital Ship Platoon
- 15th Medical Hospital Ship Platoon
- 16th Medical Hospital Ship Platoon
- 23rd Medical Hospital Ship Platoon
- 26th Medical Hospital Ship Platoon
- 27th Medical Hospital Ship Platoon
- 28th Medical Hospital Ship Platoon
- 29th Medical Hospital Ship Platoon
- 30th Medical Hospital Ship Platoon
- 31st Medical Hospital Ship Platoon
- 32nd Medical Hospital Ship Platoon
- 33rd Medical Hospital Ship Platoon
- 34th Medical Hospital Ship Platoon
- 35th Medical Hospital Ship Platoon
- 36th Medical Hospital Ship Platoon
- 37th Medical Hospital Ship Platoon
- 38th Medical Hospital Ship Platoon
- 40th Medical Hospital Ship Platoon
- 451st Medical Hospital Ship Platoon
- 452nd Medical Hospital Ship Platoon
- 453rd Medical Hospital Ship Platoon
- 454th Medical Hospital Ship Platoon
- 466th Medical Hospital Ship Platoon
  - Philippine Islands, 10 November 1945
  - Johnson City, Tennessee, 1 December 1950
  - Redesignated as the 1466th Medical Detachment, 14 July 1992
- 468th Medical Hospital Ship Platoon
- 481st Medical Hospital Ship Platoon
- 485th Medical Hospital Ship Platoon
- 487th Medical Hospital Ship Platoon
- 504th Medical Hospital Ship Platoon
- 506th Medical Hospital Ship Platoon
- 511th Medical Hospital Ship Platoon
- 512th Medical Hospital Ship Platoon
- 520th Medical Hospital Ship Platoon
- 521st Medical Hospital Ship Platoon
- 524th Medical Hospital Ship Platoon
- 528th Medical Hospital Ship Platoon
- 531st Medical Hospital Ship Platoon
- 532nd Medical Hospital Ship Platoon
- 533rd Medical Hospital Ship Platoon
- 534th Medical Hospital Ship Platoon
- 537th Medical Hospital Ship Platoon
- 539th Medical Hospital Ship Platoon
- 540th Medical Hospital Ship Platoon
- 541st Medical Hospital Ship Platoon
- 542nd Medical Hospital Ship Platoon
- 543rd Medical Hospital Ship Platoon
- 544th Medical Hospital Ship Platoon
- 546th Medical Hospital Ship Platoon
- 547th Medical Hospital Ship Platoon
  - Fort Hamilton, New York, 29 September 1945
  - Redesignated as the 993rd Medical Hospital Ship Platoon, 25 March 1948
- 548th Medical Hospital Ship Platoon
  - Camp Anza, California, 20 November 1945
  - Redesignated as the 994th Medical Hospital Ship Platoon, 19 April 1948
- 549th Medical Hospital Ship Platoon
- 550th Medical Hospital Ship Platoon
- 553rd Medical Hospital Ship Platoon
- 554th Medical Hospital Ship Platoon
- 556th Medical Hospital Ship Platoon
- 557th Medical Hospital Ship Platoon
- 558th Medical Hospital Ship Platoon
- 559th Medical Hospital Ship Platoon
- 560th Medical Hospital Ship Platoon
- 562nd Medical Hospital Ship Platoon
- 564th Medical Hospital Ship Platoon
- 565th Medical Hospital Ship Platoon
- 568th Medical Hospital Ship Platoon
- 571st Medical Hospital Ship Platoon
- 573rd Medical Hospital Ship Platoon
- 576th Medical Hospital Ship Platoon
  - Seattle Port of Embarkation, Washington, 29 September 1945
  - Redesignated as the 972nd Medical Hospital Ship Platoon, 16 October 1947
- 578th Medical Hospital Ship Platoon
- 581st Medical Hospital Ship Platoon
- 584th Medical Hospital Ship Platoon
- 593rd Medical Hospital Ship Platoon
- 597th Medical Hospital Ship Platoon
- 598th Medical Hospital Ship Platoon
- 599th Medical Hospital Ship Platoon
- 601st Medical Hospital Ship Platoon
- 606th Medical Hospital Ship Platoon
  - San Francisco Port of Embarkation, California, 6 October 1945
  - Redesignated as the 888th Medical Hospital Ship Platoon, 19 March 1948
- 608th Medical Hospital Ship Platoon
- 609th Medical Hospital Ship Platoon
- 618th Medical Hospital Ship Platoon
- 619th Medical Hospital Ship Platoon
- 620th Medical Hospital Ship Platoon
- 621st Medical Hospital Ship Platoon
- 622nd Medical Hospital Ship Platoon
- 623rd Medical Hospital Ship Platoon
- 624th Medical Hospital Ship Platoon
- 627th Medical Hospital Ship Platoon
- 630th Medical Hospital Ship Platoon
- 642nd Medical Hospital Ship Platoon
- 643rd Medical Hospital Ship Platoon
- 644th Medical Hospital Ship Platoon
- 647th Medical Hospital Ship Platoon
- 648th Medical Hospital Ship Platoon
- 650th Medical Hospital Ship Platoon
- 663nd Medical Hospital Ship Platoon
- 664th Medical Hospital Ship Platoon
- 674th Medical Hospital Ship Platoon
- 675th Medical Hospital Ship Platoon
- 681st Medical Hospital Ship Platoon
- 690th Medical Hospital Ship Platoon
- 697th Medical Hospital Ship Platoon
- 704th Medical Hospital Ship Platoon
- 710th Medical Hospital Ship Platoon
- 712th Medical Hospital Ship Platoon
- 716th Medical Hospital Ship Platoon
- 719th Medical Hospital Ship Platoon
- 733nd Medical Hospital Ship Platoon
- 738th Medical Hospital Ship Platoon
- 739th Medical Hospital Ship Platoon
- 748th Medical Hospital Ship Platoon
- 759th Medical Hospital Ship Platoon
- 778th Medical Hospital Ship Platoon
- 785th Medical Hospital Ship Platoon
- 788th Medical Hospital Ship Platoon
- 808th Medical Hospital Ship Platoon
- 821st Medical Hospital Ship Platoon
- 824th Medical Hospital Ship Platoon
- 830th Medical Hospital Ship Platoon
- 832nd Medical Hospital Ship Platoon
- 848th Medical Hospital Ship Platoon
  - Philippine Islands, 10 November 1945
  - Evansville, Indiana, 22 September 1948
  - Redesignated as the 1848th Medical Detachment 14 July 1992
- 872nd Medical Hospital Ship Platoon
- 874th Medical Hospital Ship Platoon
- 882nd Medical Hospital Ship Platoon
- 885th Medical Hospital Ship Platoon
- 888th Medical Hospital Ship Platoon
  - Sturgeon Bay, Wisconsin, 18 January 1950
  - Redesignated as the 1888th Medical Detachment, 14 July 1992
- 905th Medical Hospital Ship Platoon
- 920th Medical Hospital Ship Platoon
- 923d Medical Hospital Ship Platoon
- 926th Medical Hospital Ship Platoon
- 927th Medical Hospital Ship Platoon
- 930th Medical Hospital Ship Platoon
- 972nd Medical Hospital Ship Platoon
  - Butte, Montana, 31 August 1950
  - Redesignated as the 1972nd Medical Detachment, 14 July 1992
- 975th Medical Hospital Ship Platoon
- 987th Medical Hospital Ship Platoon
  - Philippines, 25 March 1946
  - Kingsville, Texas, 8 March 1950
  - Redesignated as the 987th Medical Detachment, 16 September 1987
- 993rd Medical Hospital Ship Platoon
  - Springfield, Ohio, 19 October 1950
  - Redesignated as the 993rd Medical Detachment, 18 September 1987
- 994th Medical Hospital Ship Platoon
  - Mansfield, Ohio, 31 January 1950
  - redesignated as the 994th Medical Detachment 16 September 1987

== Hospital trains ==
- 11th Hospital Train, France, 31 January 1946
- 22nd Ambulance Train
- 31st Ambulance Train, Germany
- 34th Ambulance Train, Germany
- 37th Ambulance Train, Germany
- 59th Hospital Train
  - Camp Sibert, Alabama, 13 November 1945
  - Redesignated as the 396th Hospital Train, 15 March 1948
- 66th Ambulance Train
- 80th Ambulance Train, Germany
- 396th Hospital Train, reorganized and redesignated as 338th Medical Group, 25 May 1950

== Named medical depots ==
- Alameda Medical Depot, 30 June 1955
- Los Angeles Medical Depot, 10 March 1946
- San Francisco Medical Depot, 31 January 1952
- Medical Storage Depot, San Francisco Port of Embarkation, 15 May 1947

== Numbered medical depots ==
- 2nd Medical Supply Depot, Algeria, disbanded 13 August 1944
- 4th Medical Supply Depot, Italy, inactivated 15 August 1944
- 5th Medical Depot, Fort Sam Houston, Texas, 30 November 1972
- 6th Medical Depot
- 7th Medical Supply Depot
- 12th Medical Supply Depot, Italy, 27 October 1945
- 20th Medical Depot Company, Iceland, 17 December 1943
- 22nd Medical Depot Company, Basra, Iraq, 17 December 1943
- 47th Medical Depot Company, Camp Butner, North Carolina, 14 November 1945
- 57th Medical Base Depot Company, Leghorn, Italy, 8 November 1947
- 60th Medical Base Depot Company, 12 May 1946
- 73rd Medical Base Depot Company, Italy, 29 June 1946

== Medical laboratories ==
- 1st Medical Laboratory
  - Germany, 4 February 1946
  - Korea, 28 January 1955
  - Phu Bai, Republic of Vietnam, 6 February 1970
  - Fort Hood, Texas, 15 June 1993
- 10th Medical Laboratory, 7th Medical Command, Germany
- 15th Medical General Laboratory, Naples, Italy, 25 October 1945

== Medical companies ==
- 607th Medical Company (Ambulance), Fort Riley, Kansas, 1971

== Medical detachments ==
- 44th Medical Detachment (Pathology), Fort Bragg, North Carolina, 1 October 2018
- 57th Malaria Control Detachment, Brazil, 30 September 1945
- 73d Medical Detachment (Veterinary Food Inspection), Fort Leonard Wood, Missouri, 25 June 1964
- 131st Surgical Detachment, Fort Bragg, NC, April 2020
- 935th Medical Detachment (KO) (Psychiatric), Long Binh, Republic of Vietnam

== Medical research units ==
- Army Industrial Hygiene Laboratory
- Armored Medical Research Laboratory (1961)
- United States Army Medical Unit (1969), precursor of the United States Army Medical Research Institute of Infectious Diseases
- United States Army Institute of Dental Research (1993), remnants now part of US Army Institute of Surgical Research (USAISR)
- United States Army Environmental Hygiene Agency (1994), now USAPHC
- United States Army Medical Research Unit-Brazil (1997)
- Walter Reed Army Institute of Research Team, Vietnam
- Walter Reed Army Institute of Research Field Epidemiological Survey Team (FEST) (Airborne), Vietnam

== Ad hoc organizations ==
- Aeromedical Isolation Team (2010)
