= 39th Evacuation Hospital (United States) =

The 39th Evacuation Hospital was part of the Medical Branch of the United States Army during World War II. It received the Meritorious Unit Commendation for service rendered during the Battle of the Bulge.

== See also ==
- List of former United States Army medical units
