= 203rd General Hospital =

The United States Army's 203rd General Hospital was activated on February 10, 1941, to meet anticipated military medical needs of a country preparing for war. Initially, the group was stationed at Fort Lewis, Washington, as a subsidiary of the base hospital there, and its primary function was to train medical technicians as army hospital and clinic support staff.

In 1942 the 203rd, commanded by Colonel James H. Turner, was reorganized as an independent general hospital unit and was ordered to prepare for combat operations overseas. The unit departed Camp Murray, Fort Lewis on December 15, 1943, by train for the six-day journey to an unknown destination, that turned out to be the New York Port of Embarkation staging camp, Camp Kilmer, New Jersey. After arrival on December 21, ninety nurses under Chief Nurse, Captain Nina E. Piatt, joined the unit, now numbering 600. They were sequestered with no outside contacts, until departure by train on 28 December 20, for a ferry to the embarkation piers on Staten Island. There the unit boarded a troop ship SS Brazil which joined a 118 ship convoy bound for Greenock, Scotland. They arrived there January 8, 1944. They then boarded a waiting train and traveled south, passing through London just after an air raid. Their ultimate destination was Petworth, Sussex, England, where they were quartered in British Army Nissen huts through which previous military units had passed. There they continued their combat and medical training, which included techniques for setting up large tent hospitals. On February 17, they departed by train for Swindon in Wiltshire where the members of the unit were driven by police to private homes in which they would be temporarily housed, while continuing training and awaiting further orders.

On April 15, 1944, the 203rd General Hospital constructed and opened an 834-bed hospital at Broadwell Grove, near Burford. It was designated under an Army numbering scheme as U.S. Army Hospital Plant No. 4147, under the auspices of the 15th Hospital Center at Cirencester, Wiltshire. They then began admitting patients. On 7 June, they fulfilled their primary mission, and received for treatment, casualties brought by train, casualties of the previous day's Normandy D-Day Landings.

In July, 1944, the 203rd followed allied armies to Normandy, landed on Utah Beach, and provided field and station hospital care during the Campaigns of Normandy and Northern France. After the liberation of Paris in August, 1944, the 203rd was assigned to a hospital plant in the Parisian region, where they administered and staffed in Garches, the largest medical establishment of the European Theater of Operations (ETO). During their tenure in Paris—from September, 1944, through July, 1945—over 65,000 patients were cared for by the 203rd. Members of the 203rd General Hospital who had remained with the unit from their Utah Beach landing until the end of the war in the ETO, were awarded two Bronze Stars, for their participation in the Battles of Normandy and Northern France.

The 203rd General Hospital was inactivated at Fort Lewis, Washington on 28 November 1945.

(NB: The 203rd was sometimes referred to as the 203d)

== See also ==
- List of former United States Army medical units

== Bibliography ==
- Montbertrand, Lois Shiner (2014). "203rd General Hospital". WW2 US Medical Research Centre.
