= Army Reserve Medical Command =

Headquarters command for all medical assets in the U.S. Army Reserve

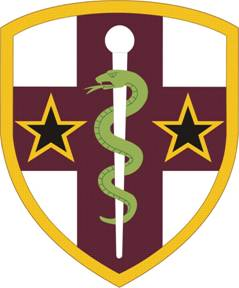
- Country: United States
- Branch: United States Army Reserve
- Role: Medical
- Size: Command
- Part of: United States Army Reserve Command
- Reserve center: Pinellas Park, Florida
- Motto: "Soldiers First"
- Medical Corps colors: Maroon and white

Commanders
- Current commander: Maj. Gen. Beth Salisbury
- Command Sergeant Major: CSM John R. Hilton

Insignia
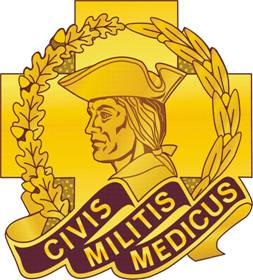
- Distinctive unit insignia

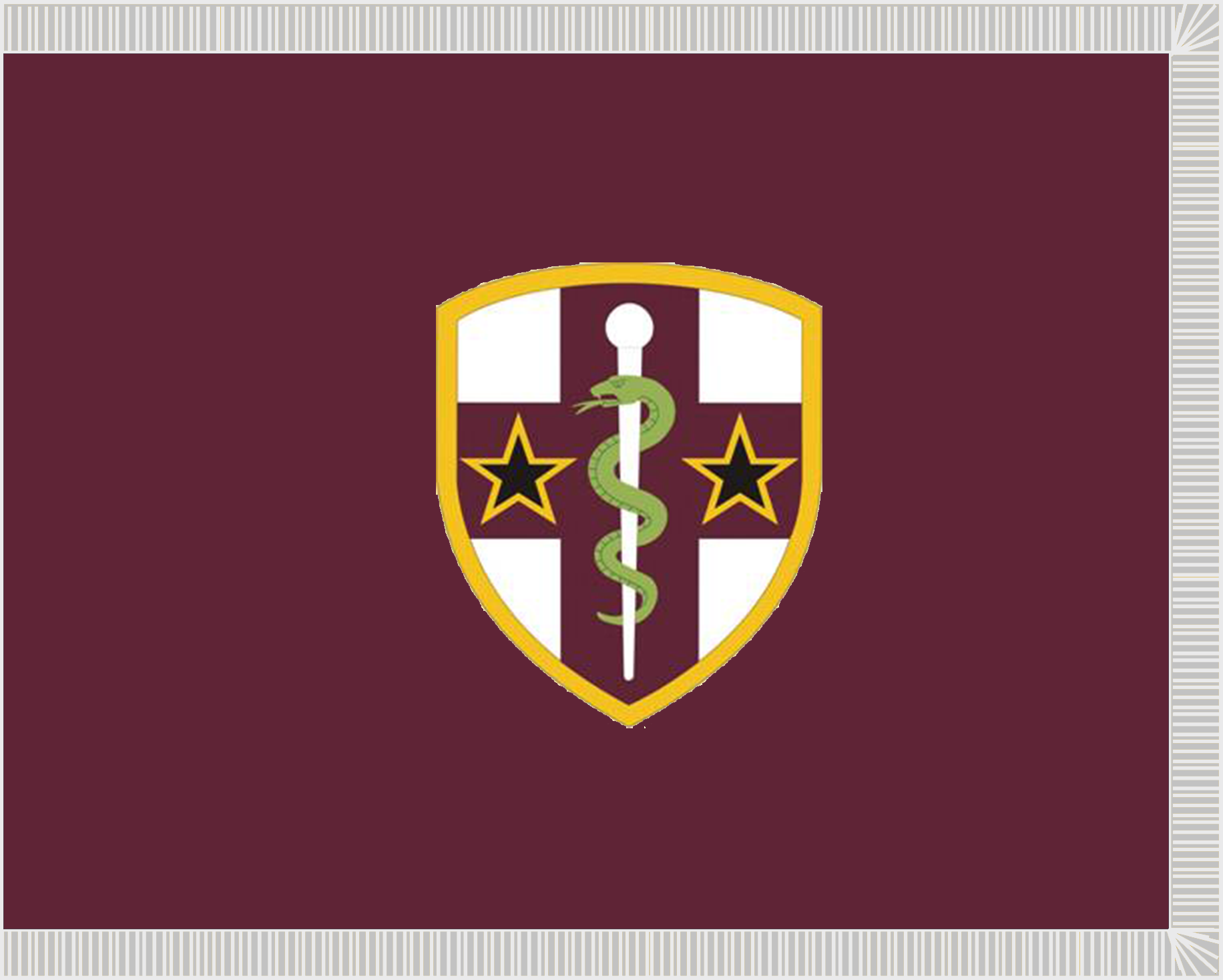
- US Army Reserve Medical Command Flag

The Army Reserve Medical Command (AR-MEDCOM) provides command and control for table of distribution and allowance (TDA) reserve medical units within the contiguous United States. Army Reserve Medical Command headquarter is located at the CW Bill Young Armed Forces Reserve Center in Pinellas Park, Florida.

Army Reserve Medical Command is responsible for all table of distribution and allowance (TDA) reserve medical units within CONUS. In 1990 the Army Reserve maintained 24 Table of Distribution and Allowances (TDA) hospitals, designed to augment 'existing Army hospitals' in the Continental United States. At that time they included the 1125th (Devens); 1207th (Benning); 1208th U.S. Army Hospital (Fort Monmouth); 2289th Army Hospital (Fort Dix); 2290th at Walter Reed; 2291st at Fort Gregg-Adams; 3270th at Fort Jackson; 3271st at Fort Stewart; 3273rd at Fort Campbell; 3274th at Fort Bragg; 3297th at Fort Gordon; 3343rd at Redstone Arsenal; 3344th at Fort Novosel; 3345th at Fort McClellan; 4005th at Fort Cavazos; 4010th, 5010th; 5501st; 5502nd; 5503rd; 6250th; 6251st; 6252nd at Fort Ord; and 6253rd Army Hospital at Fort Carson.

As of 1 August 2026 its subordinate commands include the Reserve Table of Organization and Equipment (TOE) medical units and formations that are commanded by the 807th Theater Medical Command, which covers west of Ohio, and the 3rd Theater Medical Command covers units to the east of Ohio.

== Organization ==
The Army Reserve Medical Command is a subordinate functional command of the United States Army Reserve Command. As of January 2026 the command consists of the following units:

- Army Reserve Medical Command (AR-MEDCOM), in Pinellas Park (FL)
  - Headquarters and Headquarters Company, Army Reserve Medical Command, in Pinellas Park (FL)
  - Army Medical Department (AMEDD) Professional Management Command (APMC), at Fort Gillem (GA)
  - Medical Readiness and Training Command (MRTC), at Joint Base San Antonio (TX)
    - Headquarters and Headquarters Company, Medical Readiness and Training Command, at Joint Base San Antonio (TX)
    - Regional Training Site-Medical, at Fort Gordon (GA)
    - Regional Training Site-Medical, at Camp Parks (CA)
    - Regional Training Site-Medical, at Fort McCoy (WI)
    - 1st Medical Training Brigade, at Fort Gordon (GA)
      - Headquarters and Headquarters Company, 1st Medical Training Brigade, at Fort Gordon (GA)
      - 7301st Medical Battalion (Training Support), at Joint Base McGuire–Dix–Lakehurst (NJ)
      - 7303rd Medical Battalion (Training Support), at Fort Gordon (GA)
    - 2nd Medical Training Brigade, at Fort Douglas (UT)
      - Headquarters and Headquarters Company, 2nd Medical Training Brigade, at Fort Douglas (UT)
      - 7304th Medical Battalion (Training Support), at Joint Base San Antonio (TX)
      - 7305th Medical Battalion (Training Support), in Sacramento (CA)
        - Forward Detachment, 7305th Medical Battalion (Training Support), at Camp Parks (CA)
    - 3rd Medical Training Brigade, at Joint Base San Antonio (TX)
      - Headquarters and Headquarters Company, 3rd Medical Training Brigade, at Joint Base San Antonio (TX)
      - 7302nd Medical Battalion (Training Support), in Madison (WI)
      - 7306th Medical Battalion (Exercise Support), at Joint Base San Antonio (TX)
      - 7307th Medical Battalion (Exercise Support), at Joint Base San Antonio (TX)
  - Northeast Medical Area Readiness Support Group (NE-MARSG), at Fort Wadsworth (NY)
    - Headquarters and Headquarters Company, Northeast Medical Area Readiness Support Group, at Fort Wadsworth (NY)
    - 7202nd Medical Support Unit, in Shoreham (NY)
    - 7203rd Medical Support Unit, in Hobart (IN)
    - 7207th Medical Support Unit, in Webster (NY)
    - 7221st Medical Support Unit, in Newark (DE)
    - 7238th Medical Support Unit, at Fort Hamilton (NY)
    - 7245th Medical Support Unit, at Picatinny Arsenal (NJ)
    - 7250th Medical Support Unit, in Alexandria (VA)
    - 7353rd Medical Detachment (Veterinary Services), in Hobart (IN)
    - 7358th Medical Detachment (Veterinary Services), at Picatinny Arsenal (NJ)
    - 7361st Medical Detachment (Veterinary Services), in Richmond (VA)
    - 7379th Medical Detachment (Blood Support), in Newark (DE)
    - 7387th Medical Detachment (Blood Support), at Picatinny Arsenal (NJ)
    - 7411th Troop Medical Clinic, at Fort Hamilton (NY)
    - 7412th Troop Medical Clinic, in Webster (NY)
    - 7417th Troop Medical Clinic, in Alexandria (VA)
    - 7457th Medical Operational Readiness Unit, in Richmond (VA)
  - Southeast Medical Area Readiness Support Group (SE-MARSG), in Nashville (TN)
    - Headquarters and Headquarters Company, Southeast Medical Area Readiness Support Group, in Nashville (TN)
    - 7201st Medical Support Unit, in Gainesville (FL)
    - 7217th Medical Support Unit, in Perrine (FL)
    - 7218th Medical Support Unit, in Louisville (KY)
    - 7222nd Medical Support Unit, in Tampa (FL)
    - 7223rd Medical Support Unit, in Mobile (AL)
    - 7224th Medical Support Unit, at Joint Base Charleston (SC)
    - 7225th Medical Support Unit, in Greenville (SC)
    - 7226th Medical Support Unit, at Fort Jackson (SC)
    - 7229th Medical Support Unit, in Nashville (TN)
    - 7232nd Medical Support Unit, in New Orleans (LA)
    - 7233rd Medical Support Unit, in Montgomery (AL)
    - 7235th Medical Support Unit, in Orlando (FL)
    - 7236th Medical Support Unit, in Fort Benning (GA)
    - 7239th Medical Support Unit, in Chattanooga (TN)
    - 7241st Medical Support Unit, in Lexington (KY)
    - 7242nd Medical Support Unit, in Gulfport (MS)
    - 7244th Medical Support Unit, in Kingsport (TN)
    - 7350th Medical Detachment (Veterinary Services), in Montgomery (AL)
    - 7356th Medical Detachment (Veterinary Services), in Louisville (KY)
    - 7359th Medical Detachment (Veterinary Services), at Fort Jackson (SC)
    - 7375th Medical Detachment (Blood Support), in Mobile (AL)
    - 7376th Medical Detachment (Blood Support), in Montgomery (AL)
    - 7380th Medical Detachment (Blood Support), in Perrine (FL)
    - 7381st Medical Detachment (Blood Support), at Fort Gordon (GA)
    - 7382nd Medical Detachment (Blood Support), at Fort Benning (GA)
    - 7383rd Medical Detachment (Blood Support), in Louisville (KY)
    - 7385th Medical Detachment (Blood Support), at Fort Bragg (NC)
    - 7388th Medical Detachment (Blood Support), at Fort Jackson (SC)
    - 7409th Troop Medical Clinic, in Charlotte (NC)
    - 7458th Medical Operational Readiness Unit, at Fort Bragg (NC)
    - 7459th Medical Operational Readiness Unit, at Fort Gordon (GA)
  - Central Medical Area Readiness Support Group (CE-MARSG), at Fort Sheridan (IL)
    - Headquarters and Headquarters Company, Central Medical Area Readiness Support Group, at Fort Sheridan (IL)
    - 7210th Medical Support Unit, at Joint Base San Antonio (TX)
    - 7212th Medical Support Unit, in Rochester (MN)
    - 7215th Medical Support Unit, in St. Louis (MO)
    - 7227th Medical Support Unit, in Columbia (MO)
    - 7228th Medical Support Unit, in Columbia (MO)
    - 7231st Medical Support Unit, in Lubbock (TX)
    - 7240th Medical Support Unit, in Kirksville (MO)
    - 7246th Medical Support Unit, in Elkhorn (NE)
    - 7247th Medical Support Unit, at Fort Sill (OK)
    - 7248th Medical Support Unit, at Fort Bliss (TX)
    - 7249th Medical Support Unit, at Ellington Field Joint Reserve Base (TX)
    - 7355th Medical Detachment (Veterinary Services), at Fort Des Moines (IA)
    - 7357th Medical Detachment (Veterinary Services), in Kirksville (MO)
    - 7360th Medical Detachment (Veterinary Services), at Joint Base San Antonio (TX)
    - 7384th Medical Detachment (Blood Support), in Columbia (MO)
    - 7386th Medical Detachment (Blood Support), in Elkhorn (NE)
    - 7389th Medical Detachment (Blood Support), at Joint Base San Antonio (TX)
    - 7403rd Troop Medical Clinic, in Cedar Rapids (IA)
    - 7404th Troop Medical Clinic, in Cedar Rapids (IA)
    - 7405th Troop Medical Clinic, in Rochester (MN)
    - 7406th Troop Medical Clinic, in Columbia (MO)
    - 7410th Troop Medical Clinic, in Fargo (ND)
    - 7413th Troop Medical Clinic, at Fort Bliss (TX)
    - 7414th Troop Medical Clinic, at Fort Bliss (TX)
    - 7415th Troop Medical Clinic, at Ellington Field Joint Reserve Base (TX)
    - 7416th Troop Medical Clinic, in Lubbock (TX)
    - 7454th Medical Operational Readiness Unit, at Joint Base San Antonio (TX)
    - 7455th Medical Operational Readiness Unit, in Topeka (KS)
    - 7456th Medical Operational Readiness Unit, at Fort Des Moines (IA)
      - Detachment 1, 7456th Medical Operational Readiness Unit, in Cedar Rapids (IA)
  - Western Medical Area Readiness Support Group (WE-MARSG), at Camp Parks (CA)
    - Headquarters and Headquarters Company, Western Medical Area Readiness Support Group, at Camp Parks (CA)
    - 7214th Medical Support Unit, in Garden Grove (CA)
    - 7220th Medical Support Unit, in Red Rock (AZ)
    - 7230th Medical Support Unit, at March Air Reserve Base (CA)
    - 7234th Medical Support Unit, at Camp Parks (CA)
    - 7243rd Medical Support Unit, at Nellis Air Force Base (NV)
    - 7251st Medical Support Unit, at Kirtland Air Force Base (NM)
    - 7252nd Medical Support Unit, at Fort Harrison (MT)
    - 7351st Medical Detachment (Veterinary Services), in Garden Grove (CA)
    - 7352nd Medical Detachment (Veterinary Services), in San Diego (CA)
    - 7354th Medical Detachment (Veterinary Services), in Aurora (CO)
    - 7362nd Medical Detachment (Veterinary Services), at Joint Base Lewis–McChord (WA)
    - 7377th Medical Detachment (Blood Support), in Red Rock (AZ)
    - 7378th Medical Detachment (Blood Support), in Mesa (AZ)
    - 7390th Medical Detachment (Blood Support), at Joint Base Lewis–McChord (WA)
    - 7400th Troop Medical Clinic, in Red Rock (AZ)
    - 7401st Troop Medical Clinic, in Port Hueneme (CA)
    - 7402nd Troop Medical Clinic, at Camp Parks (CA)
    - 7407th Troop Medical Clinic, at Fort Harrison (MT)
    - 7408th Troop Medical Clinic, at Fort Harrison (MT)
    - 7450th Medical Operational Readiness Unit, in Aurora (CO)
    - 7451st Medical Operational Readiness Unit, at Joint Base Lewis–McChord (WA)
    - 7452nd Medical Operational Readiness Unit, in San Diego (CA)
    - 7453rd Medical Operational Readiness Unit, in Mesa (AZ)
  - 3rd Theater Medical Command, in Forest Park (GA)
  - 807th Medical Command, at Fort Douglas (UT)

== History ==
=== List of commanders ===
No.	Commanding General		Term		
No.	Portrait	Name	Took office	Left office	Term length
1	Kenneth D. Herbst	Major General; Kenneth D. Herbst	16 October 2005	24 September 2006	343 days
2	James A. Hasbargen	Major General; James A. Hasbargen	24 September 2006	27 September 2009	3 years, 3 days
3	Robert J. Kasulke	Major General; Robert J. Kasulke (1949–2023)	27 September 2009	23 September 2012	2 years, 362 days
4	Bryan R. Kelly	Major General; Bryan R. Kelly	23 September 2012	26 September 2015	3 years, 3 days
5	Mary E. Link	Major General; Mary E. Link	26 September 2015	31 March 2019	3 years, 186 days
6	Jonathan Woodson	Major General; Jonathan Woodson	31 March 2019	26 June 2022	3 years, 87 days
7	W. Scott Lynn	Major General; W. Scott Lynn	26 June 2022	14 April 2024	1 year, 293 days
8	Michael L. Yost	Major General; Michael L. Yost	14 April 2024		2 years, 130 days

== Unit insignia ==
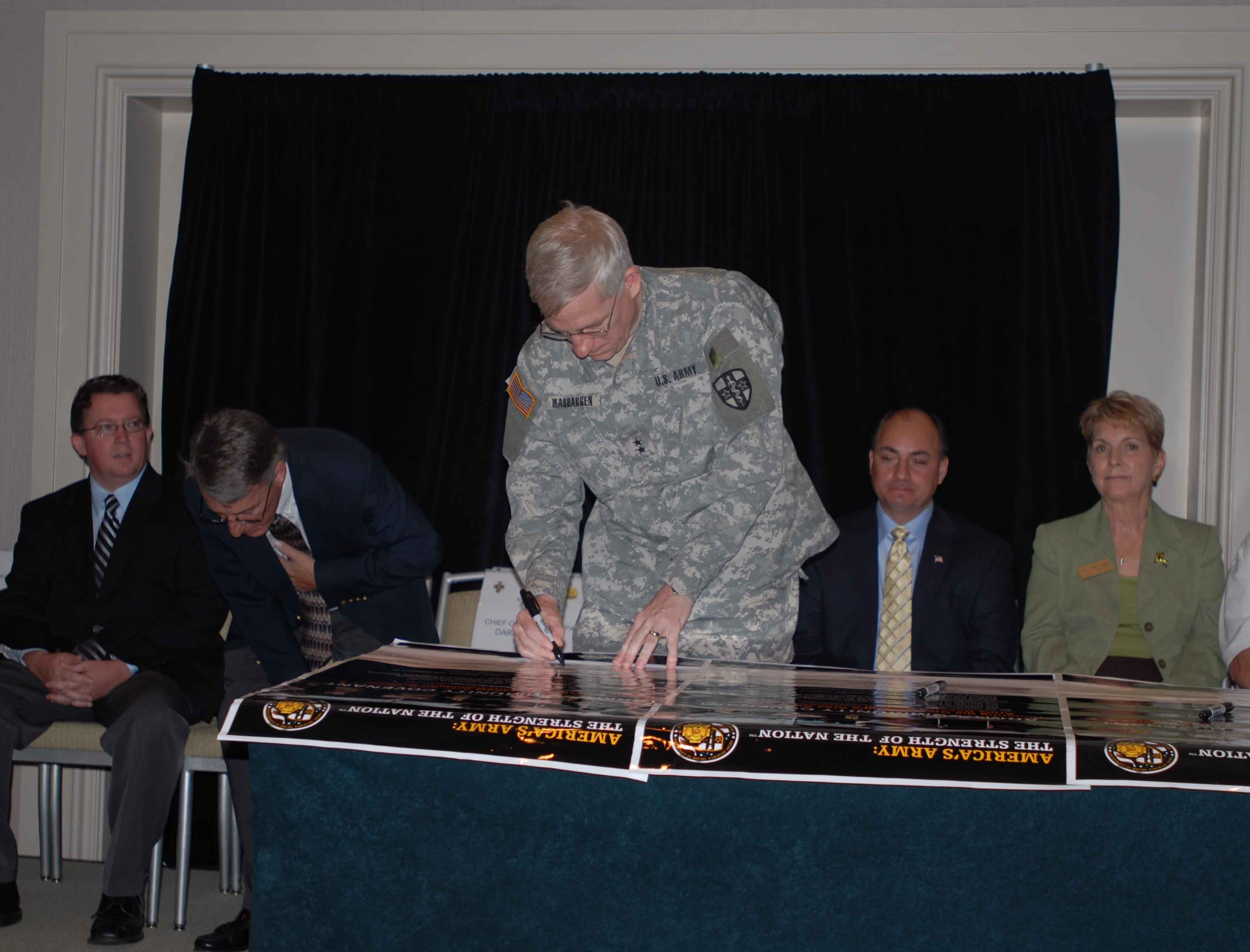
Maj. Gen. James A. Hasbargen, former Commanding General of AR-MEDCOM, Pinellas Park signs the Army Community Covenant during a ceremony held in Tampa.

=== Shoulder sleeve insignia (SSI) ===
==== Description ====
A white shield with a 1/8 inch (0.32 cm) yellow border 2 1/2 inches (6.4 cm) wide and 3 inches (7.6 cm) high overall bearing a maroon cross throughout, thereon between two black stars edged yellow a light green serpent entwined around a white rod.

==== Symbolism ====
Maroon and white are the colors traditionally used by the Medical Corps. The cross and rod of Aesculapius, symbols of healing and medicine, symbolize the organization’s medical mission. The two stars represent the training of medical individuals and medical units. The black stars edged gold recall the Army logo and military preparedness.

==== Background ====
The shoulder sleeve insignia is approved effective 1 October 2005. (TIOH Drawing Number A-1-860)

=== Distinctive unit insignia (DUI) ===
==== Description ====
A gold color metal and enamel device 1 1/8 inches (2.9 cm) high overall consisting of a gold cross superimposed by gold wreath of oak and laurel encircling a bust of a Minute Man wearing a tricorn hat, overall across the bottom, three maroon scrolls stacked bend-sinister wise doubled and inscribed with "CIVIS" "MILITIS" "MEDICUS" in gold.

==== Symbolism ====
The Minute Man is adapted from the Army Reserve plaque and highlights the Army Reserve Medical Command being a direct reporting command to Headquarters, United States Army Reserve Command. The Minute Man has also traditionally been used to represent our citizen soldiers and recalls that heritage. Gold is emblematic of honor and excellence. Maroon is the Medical Corps' primary color. The cross and motto also highlight the Command's mission. The branch of oak represents strength and growth and the laurel, high achievement.

==== Background ====
The distinctive unit insignia is approved effective 1 October 2005.
