= 804th Medical Brigade =

- Shoulder sleeve insignia
- Active: 1943-1946; 1948-Present
- Country: United States
- Branch: United States Army Reserve
- Type: Medical brigade
- Size: Brigade
- Part of: 3rd Medical Command
- Garrison/HQ: Ayer, Massachusetts
- Motto: To Your Health
- Colors: Maroon and White

Insignia
- Distinctive unit insignia

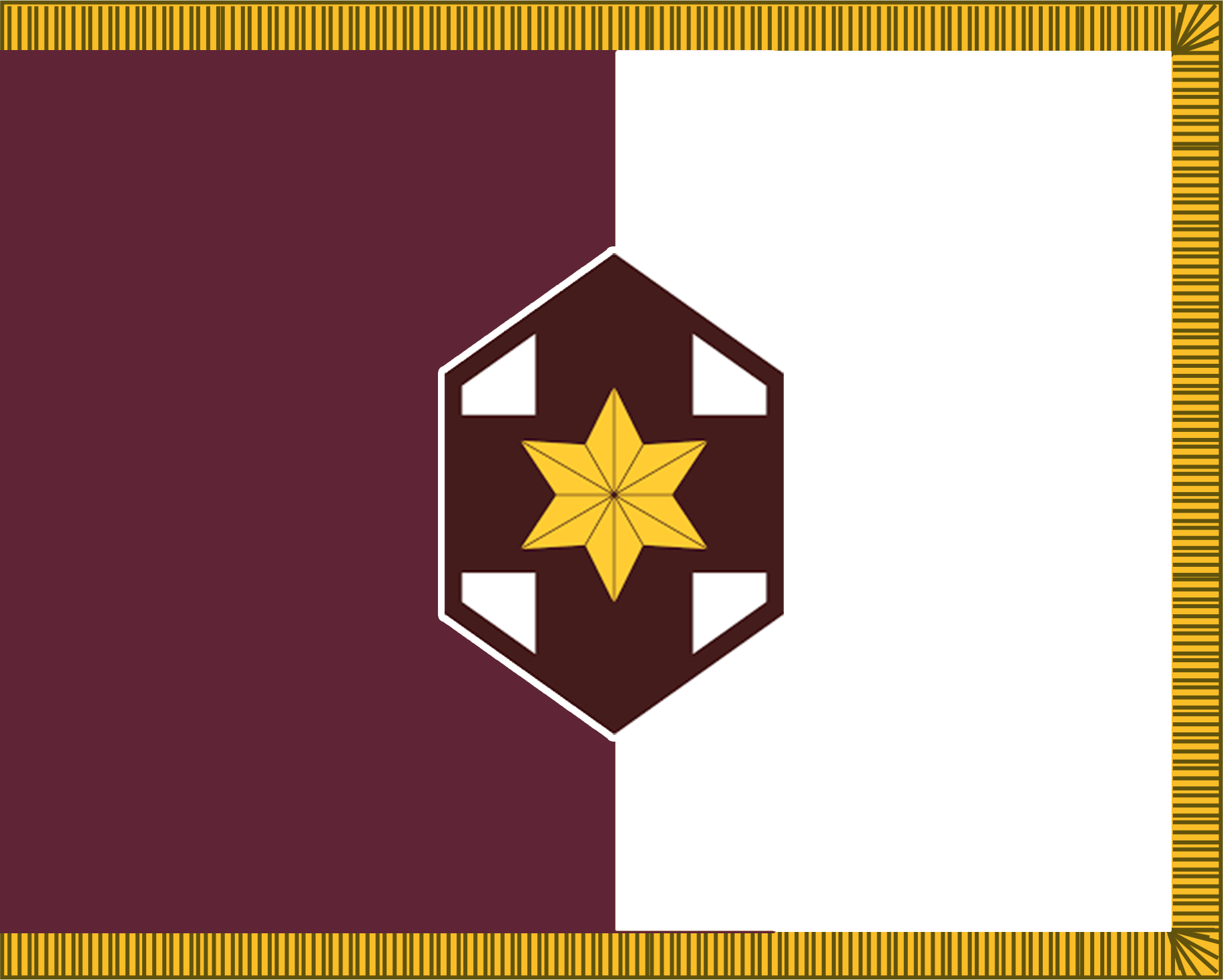
- 804th Medical Brigade Flag

The 804th Medical Brigade is a medical brigade of the United States Army Reserve subordinate to the 3rd Medical Command and located at Fort Devens in Ayer, Massachusetts.

== Current organization ==
The 804th Medical Brigade is a subordinate unit of the 3rd Theater Medical Command. As of January 2026 the brigade consists of the following units:

- 804th Medical Brigade, at Fort Devens (MA)
  - Headquarters and Headquarters Company, 804th Medical Brigade, at Fort Devens (MA)
  - 327th Medical Company (Logistics), at Naval Station Newport (RI)
  - 377th Medical Company (Ground Ambulance), in White River Junction (VT)
  - 455th Dental Company (Area Support), at Fort Devens (MA)
  - 456th Medical Company (Area Support), in Somersworth (NH)
  - 794th Medical Detachment (Preventive Medicine), at Fort Devens (MA)
  - 883rd Medical Detachment (Combat and Operational Stress Control — COSC), in Brockton (MA)
  - 803rd Hospital Center, at Fort Devens (MA)
    - Headquarters and Headquarters Detachment, at Fort Devens (MA)
    - 399th Field Hospital (32 Bed), in Taunton (MA)
      - Headquarters and Headquarters Detachment, in Taunton (MA)
      - 454th Medical Detachment (Hospital Augmentation, Intermediate Care Ward 60 Bed), in Portsmouth (NH)
      - 1452nd Medical Detachment (Hospital Augmentation, Intermediate Care Ward 60 Bed), in Portsmouth (NH)
    - 405th Field Hospital (32 Bed), in West Hartford (CT)
      - Headquarters and Headquarters Detachment, in West Hartford (CT)
      - 338th Medical Detachment (Minimal Care), at Fort Greene (RI)
      - 451st Medical Detachment (Hospital Augmentation, Medical 32 Bed), in Worcester (MA)
      - 479th Medical Detachment (Hospital Augmentation, Surgical 24 Bed), in Worcester (MA)
    - 402nd Medical Detachment Team (Forward Resuscitative and Surgical), at Fort Devens (MA)
    - 912th Medical Detachment Team (Forward Resuscitative and Surgical), in Cranston (RI)
    - 947th Medical Detachment Team (Forward Resuscitative and Surgical), in West Hartford (CT)

== Lineage and Honors ==
=== Lineage ===
- Constituted October 1944 in the Army of the United States as the 804th Medical Service Detachment.
- Activated November 1944 in England, European Theater of Operations.
- Reorganized and redesignated April 1945 as Headquarters and Headquarters Detachment, 804th Hospital Center.
- Inactivated January 1946 in England.
- Redesignated October 1947 as Headquarters and Headquarters Detachment, 804th Hospital Center, allocated to the organized reserves assigned to the Fifth Army.
- Activated January 1948 at St. Paul, Minnesota.
- Reorganized and redesignated October 1949 as Headquarters, 804th Hospital Center.
- Withdrawn July 1952 from assignment to the Fifth Army and assigned to the First Army.
- Reassigned 20 August 1952 to Boston Army Base, Boston, Massachusetts.
- Assigned 1 April 1968 to Headquarters, XIII Corps, although still attached to the 94th U.S. Army Reserve Command.
- Reassigned to the 94th U.S. Army Reserve Command, June 1968.
- Relocated 1 August 1974 from Boston USAR center, Boston Army Base, to Armed Forces Reserve Center, Hanscom Air Force Base, Massachusetts.
- Reorganized and redesignated 16 September 1993, as Headquarters and Headquarters Company, 804th Medical Brigade.
- Relocated August 1994, from Hanscom Air Force Base to Burke U.S. Army Reserve Center, Fort Devens, Massachusetts.

=== Honors ===
==== Campaign Participation Credit ====
- World War II
  - European-African-Middle Eastern Theater, Streamer without inscription
- Global War on Terror
  - Campaigns to me determined

=== Decorations ===
- Meritorious Unit Citation (Army), Streamer embroidered KUWAIT 2011

== Insignia ==
=== Shoulder Sleeve Insignia ===
Shoulder Sleeve Insignia, 804th Medical Brigade

==== Description ====
On a white hexagon one point up, with a 1/8 inch (.32 cm) maroon border, 3 inches (7.62 cm) in height and 2 1/8 inches (5.40 cm) in width, a maroon cross throughout bearing a yellow six-pointed star.

==== Symbolism ====
Maroon and white are the colors traditionally associated with the Medical Corps. The cross reflects medical aid and assistance while the gold star expresses excellence and achievement. The six-pointed star, echoed by the hexagon configuration of the insignia, alludes to the six New England states comprising the unit's command.

==== Background ====
The shoulder sleeve insignia was originally approved for the 804th Hospital Center on 17 July 1990. It was redesignated for the 804th Medical Brigade on 8 April 1999. (TIOH Dwg. No. A-1-780)

=== Distinctive Unit Insignia ===
Distinctive Unit Insignia, 804th Medical Brigade

==== Description ====
A gold color metal and enamel device 1 3/16 inches (3.02 cm) in height overall consisting of a disc divided horizontally white and maroon bearing two green serpents entwined with their heads extending at the top, the disc bearing overall at center a red cross charged with a gold lamp of knowledge; and atop the cross between the serpents' heads a six-pointed gold star; around the base of the disc the inscription "TO YOUR HEALTH" in gold letters.

==== Symbolism ====
Maroon and white are the colors used for the Army Medical Department. A red cross is emblematic of aid and assistance. The disc, base of the design, connotes unity. The serpents, lamp and star allude to the caduceus and the mission with the color green alluding to the ancient academic gowns of medicine. The lamp indicates enlightenment and the star represents the six New England states comprising the unit's command.

==== Background ====
The distinctive unit insignia was originally approved for the 804th Hospital Center on 14 December 1979. It was redesignated for the 804th Medical Brigade on 8 April 1999.

=== Combat Service Identification Badge ===
==== Description/Blazon ====
A gold color metal and enamel device 2 inches (5.08 cm) in height consisting of a design similar to the shoulder sleeve insignia.

== Commanders ==
Image	Rank	Name	Branch	Begin date	End date	Notes
	Colonel	Melville H. McNerney	MC	November 1944	June 1945	
	Colonel					
		Inactive		January 1946	January 1948	
	Colonel	Edward P. Burch	MC	January 1948	19 August 1952	
	Brigadier General	Alexander Marble	MC	20 August 1952	1961	
	Brigadier General	Phillips L. Boyd	MC	1961	1964	
	Brigadier General	Thomas A. Warthin	MC	1965	1969	
	Brigadier General	Charles L. Easterday	MC	1969	31 August 1976	
	Brigadier General	Robert B. Golbey	MC	1 September 1976	23 October 1980	
	Brigadier General	Richard H. Bailey II	MC	October 1980	June 1984	
	Brigadier General	George J. Busch	MC	June 1984	November 1987	
	Brigadier General	John R. Galvin	MC	November 1987	November 1991	
	Brigadier General	James D. Slavin, Jr.	MC	November 1991	November 1995	
	Brigadier General	Haywood S. Gilliam	MC	November 1995	September 1998	
	Brigadier General	Ronald D. Silverman	DC	October 1998	September 2002	Retired as a Major General.
	Brigadier General	Dean G. Sienko	MC	October 2002	May 2006	Deployed the Brigade Headquarters to Kuwait in support of Operation Enduring Freedom. Retired as a Major General.
	Colonel	Jonathan Woodson	MC	May 2006	October 2006	Later served as Assistant Secretary of Defense (Health Affairs) and President, Uniformed Services University of the Health Sciences.
	Brigadier General	Oscar S. DePriest IV	DC	October 2006	October 2009	
	Colonel					
	Colonel	Nelson G. Rosen	MC	May 2012	July 2014	Retired as a Brigadier General
	Colonel					
	Colonel	Beth A. Salisbury	SP	February 2015	July 2016	First officer in the Army medical Specialist Corps to be promoted to General Officer; first officer in the Army Medical Specialist Corps to be promoted to Major General
	Colonel					
	Colonel					
	Colonel	Cindy M. Saladin-Muhammad	MS	July 2021	November 2023	Later promoted to Brigadier General.
	Colonel					
	Colonel					
	Colonel					
	Colonel					

== Historic organization ==
=== 1945 ===
- Headquarters, 804th Hospital Center
- 68th General Hospital
- 82nd General Hospital
- 83rd General Hospital
- 109th General Hospital
- 129th General Hospital
- 137th General Hospital
- 157th General Hospital
- 182nd General Hospital
- 10th Station Hospital
- 33rd Station Hospital
- 36th Station Hospital
- 168th Station Hospital
- 312th Station Hospital
- 316th Station Hospital
- 57th Field Hospital

=== 1966 ===
- Headquarters and Headquarters Detachment, 804th Hospital Center, Boston Army Base, Massachusetts
- 340th General Hospital, New Haven, Connecticut
- 331st General Hospital, Lawrence, Massachusetts
- 351st General Hospital, Boston, Massachusetts
- 373rd General Hospital, Boston, Massachusetts
- 455th General Hospital, Warwick, Rhode Island
- 803rd Medical Group, Boston, Massachusetts
- 399th Evacuation Hospital, Taunton, Massachusetts
- 18th Field Hospital, Pittsfield, Massachusetts
- 309th Field Hospital, Springfield, Massachusetts
- 819th Station Hospital, Hartford, Connecticut
- 1125th US Army Hospital, Auburn, Maine
- 173rd Medical Battalion, Saco, Maine
- 323rd Medical Depot, Boston, Massachusetts

=== 1978 ===
- Headquarters and Headquarters Detachment, 804th Hospital Center, Hanscom Air Force Base, Massachusetts
- 340th General Hospital, New Haven, Connecticut
- 351st General Hospital, Bedford, Massachusetts
- 373rd General Hospital, Brockton, Massachusetts
- 455th General Hospital, Providence, Rhode Island
- 1125th US Army Hospital, Auburn, Maine
- 323rd Medical Laboratory, Bedford, Massachusetts
- 173rd Medical Group, Westover Air Force Base, Massachusetts
  - 819th Station Hospital
- 803rd Medical Group, Brockton, Massachusetts
  - 399th Combat Support Hospital, Taunton, Massachusetts
