= 332nd Brigade =

332nd Brigade may refer to:

- 332nd Brigade, Royal Field Artillery, United Kingdom
- 332nd Medical Brigade, United States

== See also ==
- 332nd Regiment (disambiguation)
