= 5th Medical Brigade =

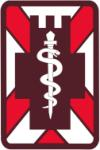
- Shoulder sleeve insignia
- Country: United States
- Branch: United States Army Reserve
- Type: Medical brigade
- Size: Brigade
- Part of: 3rd Medical Command
- Garrison/HQ: Birmingham, Alabama
- Mottos: Leadership and Service
- Colors: Maroon and White

Insignia
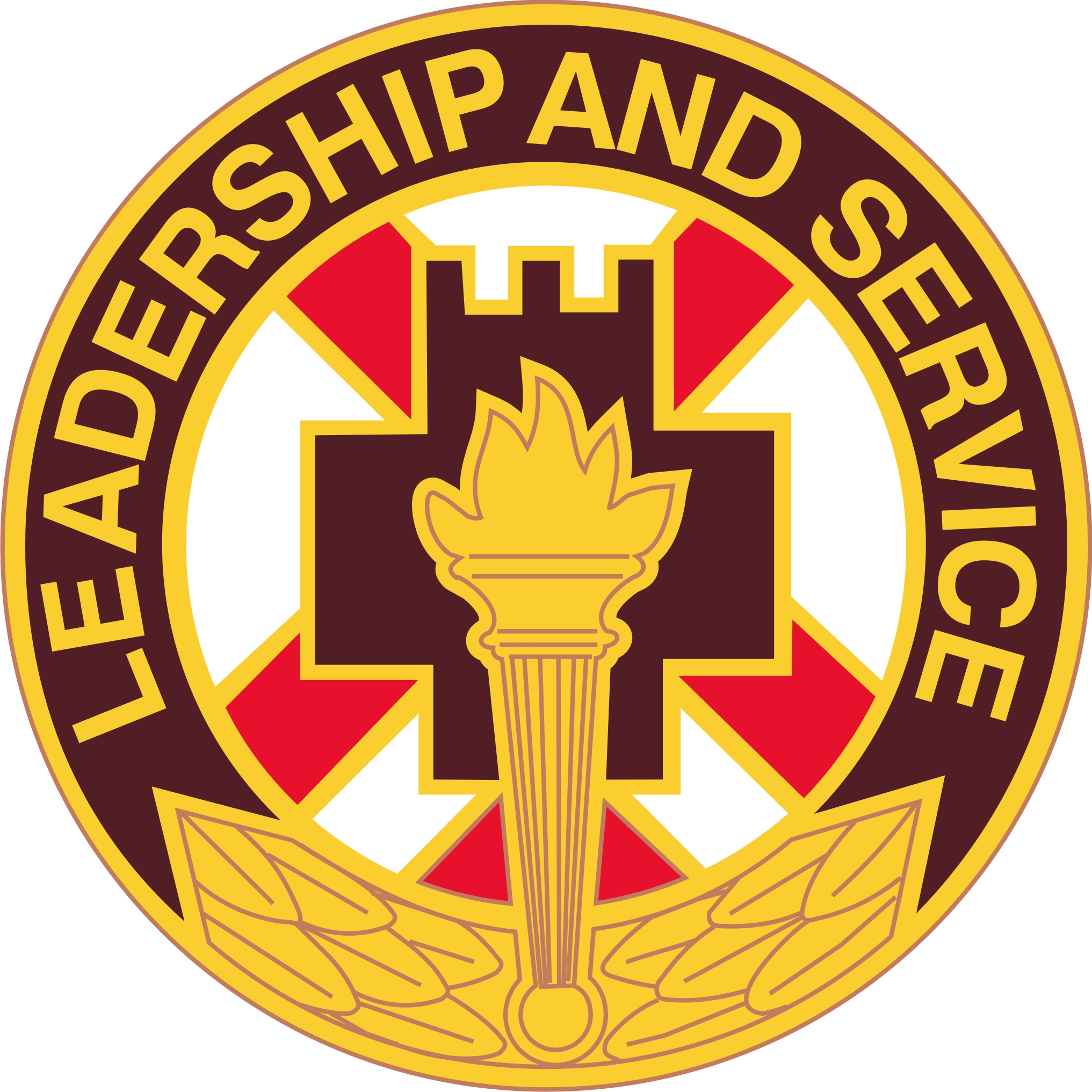
- Distinctive unit insignia

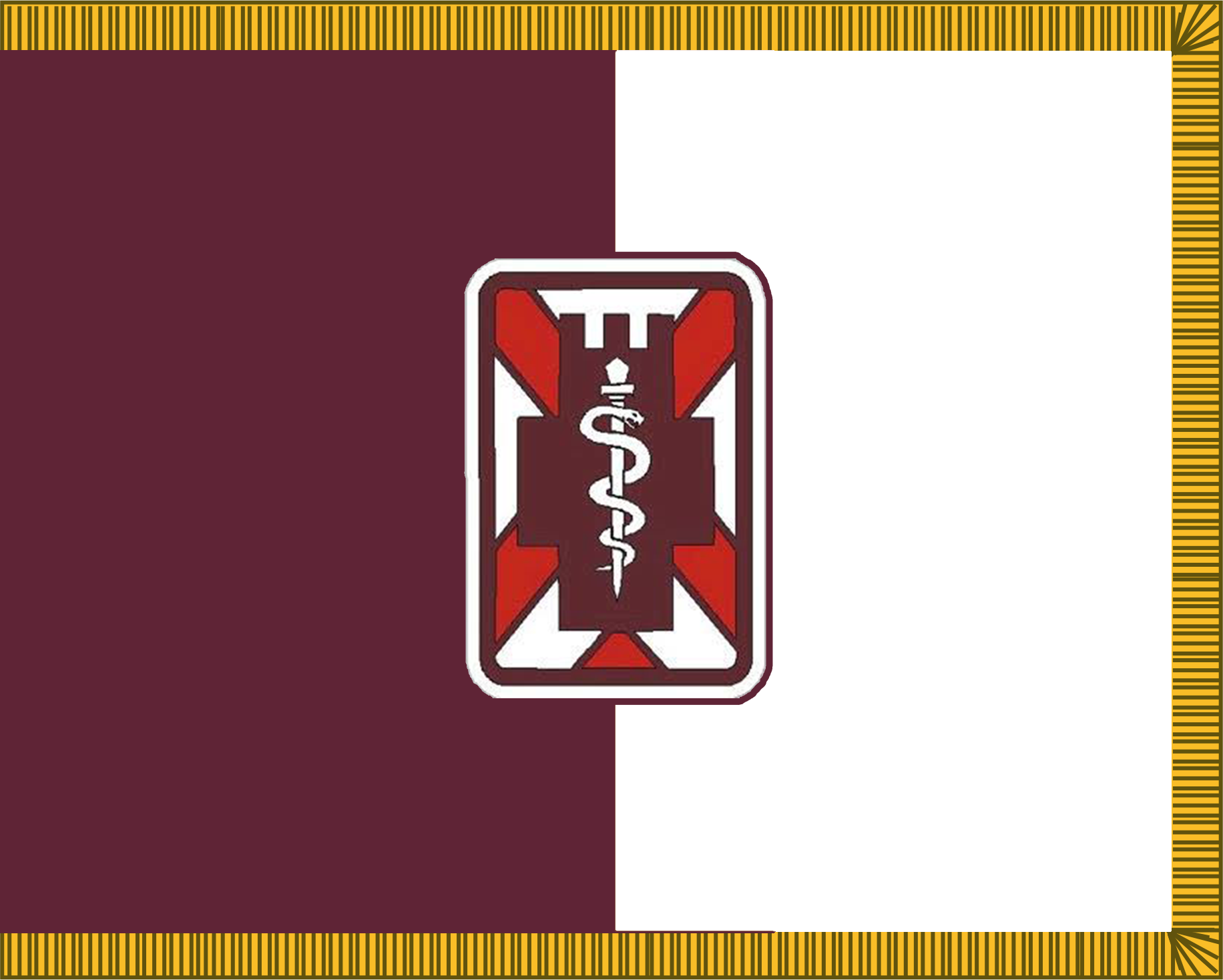
- 5th Medical Brigade Flag

The 5th Medical Brigade is a medical brigade of the United States Army Reserve subordinate to the 3rd Medical Command and headquartered in Birmingham, Alabama.

== Current organization ==
The 5th Medical Brigade is a subordinate unit of the 3rd Theater Medical Command. As of January 2026 the brigade consists of the following units:

- 5th Medical Brigade, in Birmingham (AL)
  - Headquarters and Headquarters Company, 5th Medical Brigade, in Birmingham (AL)
  - 429th Medical Battalion (Multifunctional), in Savannah (GA)
    - Headquarters and Headquarters Detachment, in Savannah (GA)
    - 345th Medical Detachment (Preventive Medicine), at Fort Gillem (GA)
    - 355th Medical Company (Area Support), in Bossier City (LA)
    - 358th Medical Detachment (Veterinary Services), in Montgomery (AL)
    - 384th Medical Company (Logistics), at Fort Gillem (GA)
    - 384th Medical Detachment (Combat and Operational Stress Control — COSC), in McLeansville (NC)
    - 396th Medical Company (Ground Ambulance), in McLeansville (NC)
    - 473rd Medical Company (Ground Ambulance), in Paducah (KY)
    - 787th Medical Detachment (Preventive Medicine), in New Orleans (LA)
  - 810th Hospital Center, in Tuscaloosa (AL)
    - Headquarters and Headquarters Detachment, in Tuscaloosa (AL)
    - 75th Field Hospital (32 Bed), in Tuscaloosa (AL)
      - Headquarters and Headquarters Detachment, in Tuscaloosa (AL)
      - 302nd Medical Detachment (Hospital Augmentation, Intermediate Care Ward 60 Bed), in Millington (TN)
      - 407th Medical Detachment (Hospital Augmentation, Medical 32 Bed), in Tuscaloosa (AL)
    - 306th Field Hospital (32 Bed), at Fort Gillem (GA)
      - Headquarters and Headquarters Detachment, at Fort Gillem (GA)
      - 311th Medical Detachment (Hospital Augmentation, Surgical 24 Bed), at Fort Gillem (GA)
      - 1146th Medical Detachment (Hospital Augmentation, Intermediate Care Ward 60 Bed), at Fort Gillem (GA)
    - 382nd Medical Detachment (Minimal Care), in Asheville (NC)
    - 933rd Medical Detachment Team (Forward Resuscitative and Surgical), in Paducah (KY)
    - 936th Medical Detachment Team (Forward Resuscitative and Surgical), in Paducah (KY)
    - 946th Medical Detachment Team (Forward Resuscitative and Surgical), in Mobile (AL)

== Lineage and Honors ==
=== Lineage ===
- Constituted 5 September 1928 in the Organized Reserves as the 5th Auxiliary Surgical Group and allotted to the Sixth Corps Area
- Initiated 23 August 1929 at Chicago, Illinois
- Inactivated 9 October 1937 at Chicago, Illinois
- Activated 20 April 1943 at Chicago, Illinois
- Inactivated 13 November 1945 Camp Sibert, Alabama
- (Organized Reserves redesignated Organized Reserve Corps, 25 March 1948)
- Redesignated 3 November 1948 as Headquarters and Headquarters Detachment, 330th Medical Group
- Assigned to First United States Army, 8 November 1948
- Activated 19 November 1948 at Portland, Oregon
- Inactivated 28 June 1950 at Portland
- (Organized Reserve Corps redesignated Army Reserve, 9 July 1952)
- Redesignated 20 April 1953 as Headquarters and Headquarters Detachment, 5th Medical Group
- Activated 16 July 1982 at Birmingham, Alabama
- Reorganized and Redesignated XXX as Headquarters and Headquarters Company, 5th Medical Brigade

=== Honors ===
==== Campaign Participation Credit ====
- World War II
  - Northern France
  - Rhineland
  - Central Europe

==== Decorations ====
- Army Superior Unit Award, streamer embroidered "2003"

== Insignia ==
=== Shoulder Sleeve Insignia ===
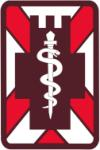
Shoulder Sleeve Insignia, 5th Medical Brigade

==== Description ====
A white rectangle with rounded corners 3 inches (7.62 cm) in height and 2 inches (5.08 cm) in width overall bearing a red saltire (Saint Andrew's Cross), bordered in maroon. Emitting from base is a red triangle with a narrow maroon border. Centered on the saltire a maroon cross with three crenellations on its upper arm bearing a sword with a serpent coiled around it, all white; all within a 1/8 inch (.32 cm) maroon border.

==== Symbolism ====
The crenellated cross symbolizes medical strength and defense. The scarlet saltire (Cross of Saint Andrew) symbolizes the Brigade's mission of supporting the medical requirements of Soldiers and their sacrifices on the battlefield. The red triangle alludes to the iron rich Red Mountain, under whose shadow the unit resides. The reference to the Staff of Ae culapius alludes to its attribute of the Roman god of medicine and healing.

==== Background ====
The shoulder sleeve insignia was approved effective 16 September 2011. The insignia was amended to modify the symbolism on 6 April 2023.

=== Distinctive Unit Insignia ===
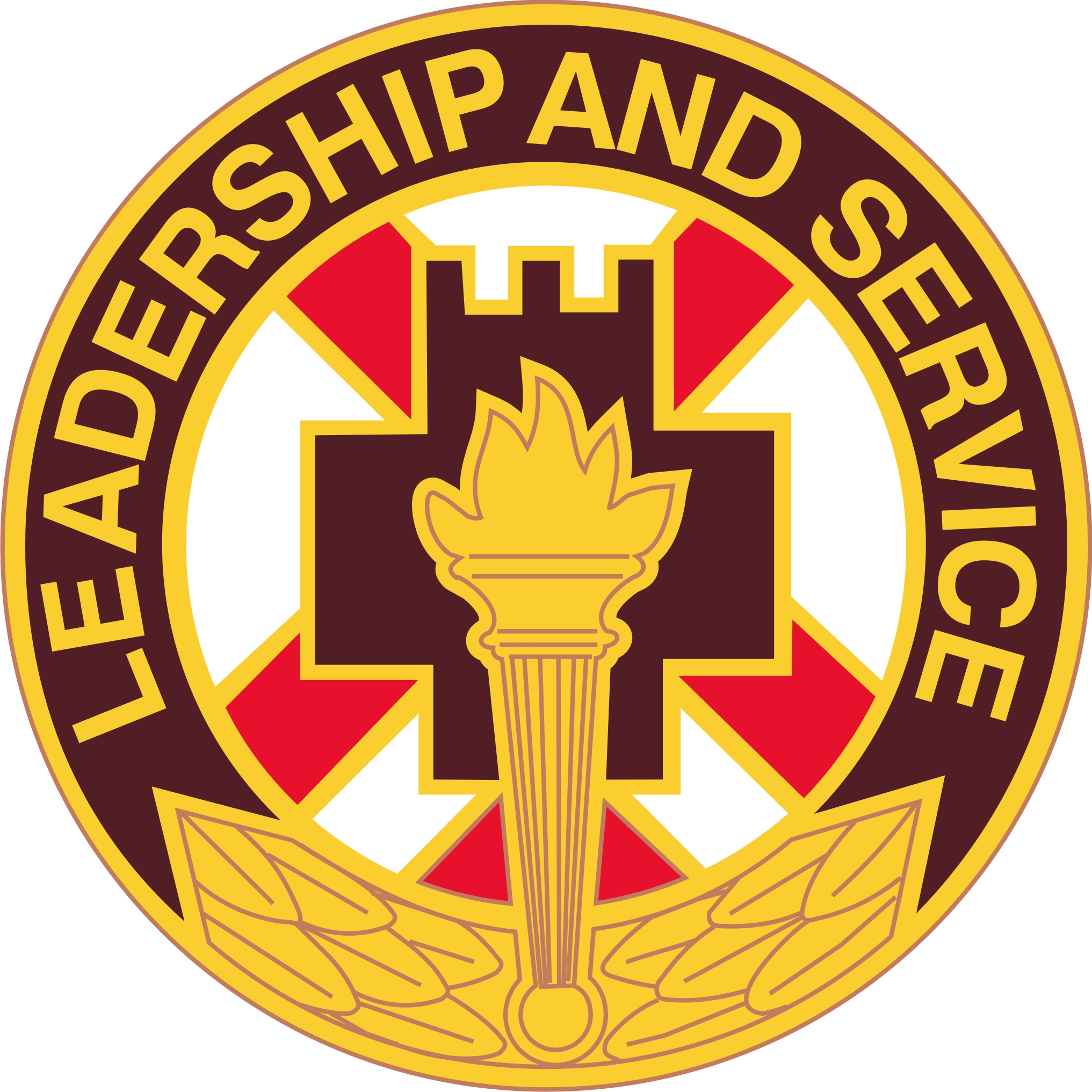
Distinctive Unit Insignia, 5th Medical Brigade

==== Description ====
A gold color metal and enamel device 1 1/8 inches (2.86 cm) in height overall consisting of a white disc charged with a scarlet saltire above a scarlet mound and centered overall a maroon cross with three crenellations on its upper arm, all within a circular maroon scroll with forked ends bearing at top the words “LEADERSHIP AND SERVICE” in gold, and issuant from each end toward center base a sprig of gold laurel leaves; overall a gold torch with flame centered upon the cross and handle between the leaves at center base.

==== Symbolism ====
The mission and location of the unit are represented by four elements; namely, the scarlet saltire (Cross of Saint Andrew) symbolizes the Brigade's mission of supporting the medical requirements of Soldiers and their sacrifices on the battlefield. The mound at the base of the cross which refers to Red Mountain where Birmingham is located, the flames of industry which light the skies of the city by night, and the encircling scroll representing a magic circle recalling the name, “Magic City,” as Birmingham is sometimes described. The torch represents the leadership emphasized in the motto and its five flames the name, the numerical designation. The maroon cross representing medical service is embattled with three merlons which symbolize the World War II campaigns in which the unit participated, and the laurel leaves in base connote distinguished service.

==== Background ====
The distinctive unit insignia was originally approved for the 5th medical Group on 24 November 1982. It was redesignated effective 16 September 2011, for the 5th Medical Brigade and amended to update the description and symbolism. The insignia was amended to modify the symbolism on 6 April 2023.

== History ==
=== The Early Years ===
The 5th Auxiliary Surgical Group was constituted in the Organized Reserve on 5 September 1928, was assigned to the General Headquarters Reserve, and was assigned to the Sixth Corps Area. The group was initiated on 23 August 1929 at Chicago, Illinois. It was inactivated 9 October 1937 at Chicago by the transfer of all assigned personnel to the 2nd Auxiliary Surgical Group. the group conducted annual training at the station hospital, Fort Sheridan, Illinois.

=== World War II ===
The 5th Auxiliary Surgical Group returned to the United States on 3 September 1945, arriving at Newport News, Virginia aboard the USS General C. C. Ballou.

== Commanders ==
Image	Rank	Name	Branch	Begin date	End date	Notes
	Major	Loren D. Sayre	MC	23 August 1929	3 January 1930	
	Major	George H. Eddington	MC	3 January 1930	June 1930	
	Lieutenant Colonel	Emery B. Neff	MC	June 1930	1 September 1936	
	Lieutenant Colonel	James C. Cerny	MC	1 September 1936	9 October 1937	
		Inactive		10 October 1937	19 April 1943	
	Colonel	Robert B. Hill	MC	20 October 1943		Regular Army Medical Corps officer who served in both World Wars, he retired as a Brigadier General in 1956.
	Colonel					
	Lieutenant Colonel	George C. Martin	MC			Also served as the leader of a surgical team and as the group executive officer before assuming command
		Inactive		14 November 1945	2 November 1948	
	Colonel					
	Colonel					
	Colonel					
		Inactive		29 June 1950	15 July 1982	
	Colonel					
	Colonel					
	Colonel					
	Colonel	James M. Richard			6 August 1995	
	Colonel	Frank S. Haddad	MS	6 August 1995	April 1997	Retired as a Brigadier General
	Colonel					
	Colonel					
	Colonel	Margaret C. Wilmoth	AN	January 2005	May 2005	Retired as a Major General
	Colonel					
	Colonel	James H. Mason	MS	October 2009	August 2011	Retired as a Brigadier General
	Colonel					
	Colonel	Jeffrey B. McCarter	MS	December 2015	December 2017	Retired as a Major General
	Colonel					
	Colonel	Jennifer A. Marrast Host	MC	September 2018	August 2020	
	Colonel					
