= 338th Medical Brigade =

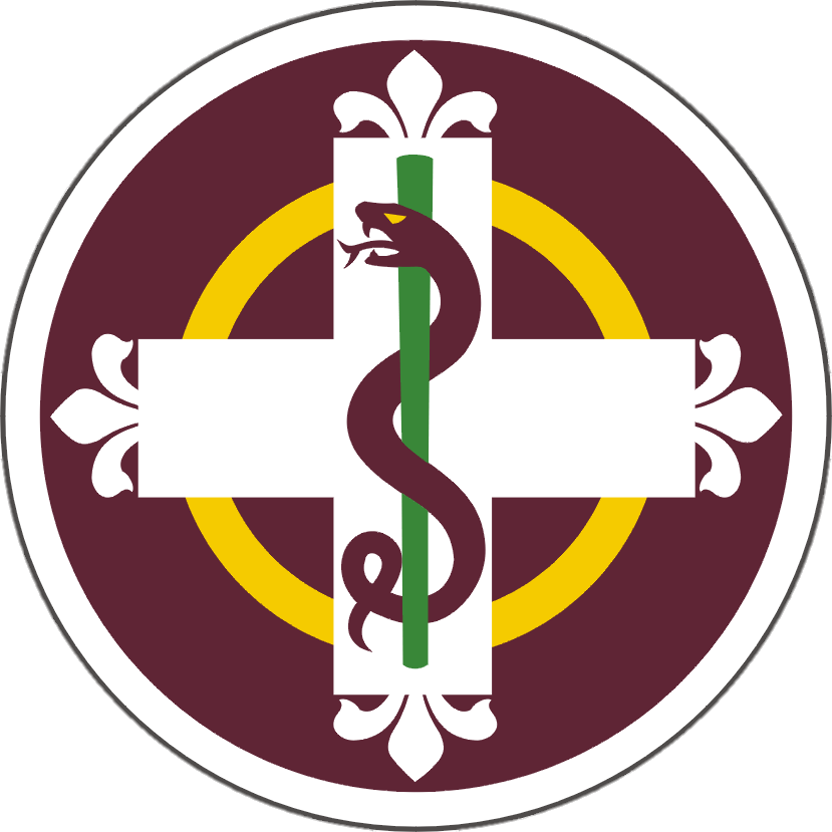
- Shoulder sleeve insignia
- Country: United States
- Branch: United States Army Reserve
- Type: Medical brigade
- Size: Brigade
- Part of: 3rd Medical Command
- Motto: Sound Body Sharp Mind
- Colors: Maroon and White

Insignia
- Distinctive unit insignia

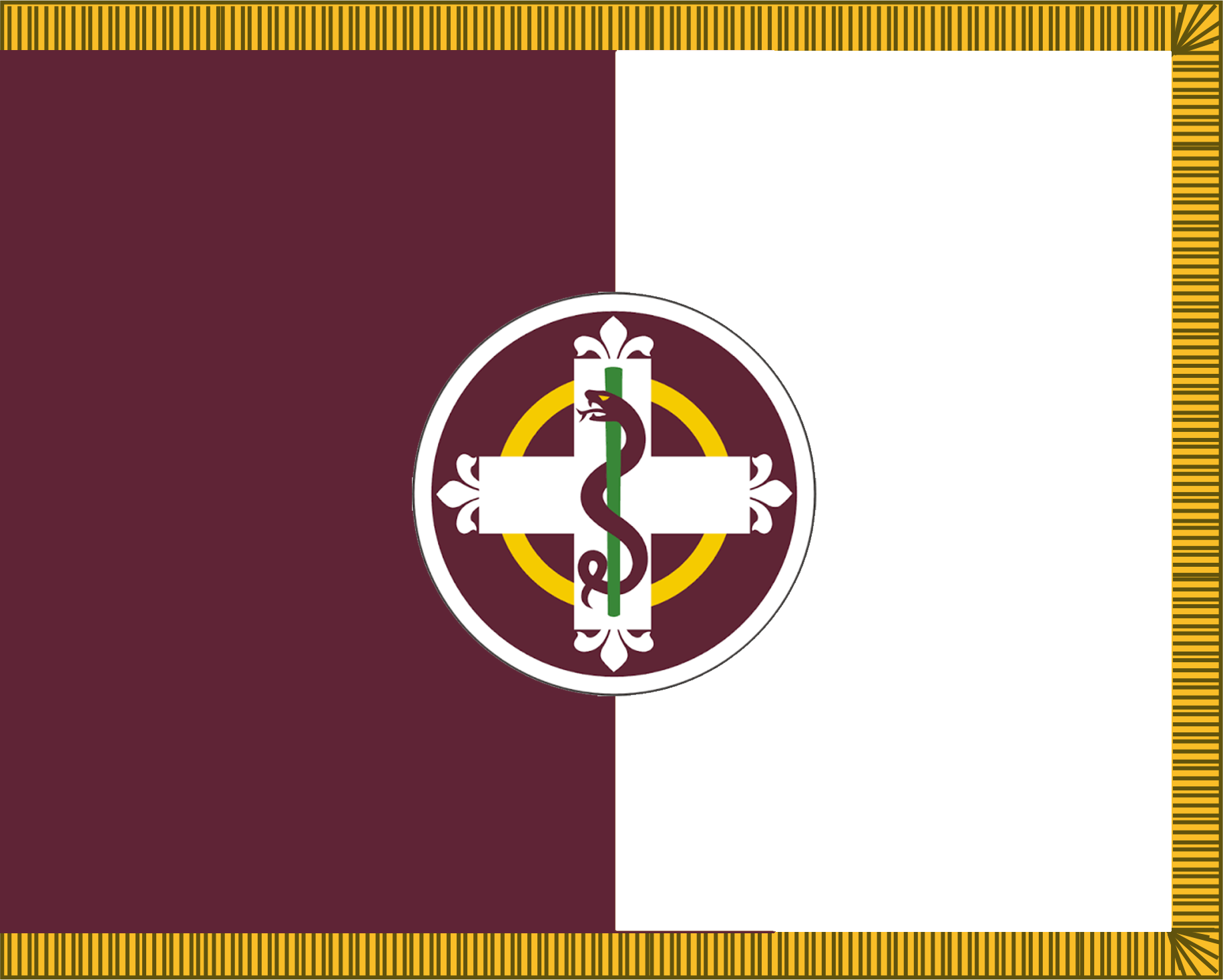
- 338th Medical Brigade Flag

The 338th Medical Brigade is a medical brigade of the United States Army Reserve subordinate to the 3rd Medical Command with its headquarters at Horsham, Pennsylvania.

== Current organization ==
The 338th Medical Brigade is a subordinate unit of the 3rd Theater Medical Command. As of January 2026 the brigade consists of the following units:

- 338th Medical Brigade, at Biddle Air National Guard Base (PA)
  - Headquarters and Headquarters Company, 338th Medical Brigade, at Biddle Air National Guard Base (PA)
  - 410th Hospital Center, at Fort Meade (MD)
    - Headquarters and Headquarters Detachment, at Fort Meade (MD)
    - 18th Field Hospital (32 Bed), at Joint Expeditionary Base Fort Story (VA)
      - Headquarters and Headquarters Detachment, at Joint Expeditionary Base Fort Story (VA)
      - 304th Medical Detachment (Hospital Augmentation, Medical 32 Bed), at Joint Expeditionary Base Fort Story (VA)
      - 335th Medical Detachment (Hospital Augmentation, Intermediate Care Ward 60 Bed), at Joint Expeditionary Base Fort Story (VA)
    - 348th Field Hospital (32 Bed), at Fort Meade (MD)
      - Headquarters and Headquarters Detachment, at Fort Meade (MD)
      - 336th Medical Detachment (Hospital Augmentation, Intermediate Care Ward 60 Bed), at Fort Meade (MD)
      - 378th Medical Detachment (Hospital Augmentation, Surgical 24 Bed), at Fort Meade (MD)
    - 624th Medical Detachment Team (Forward Resuscitative and Surgical), in Fairview (PA)
    - 901st Medical Detachment (Minimal Care), in Fairmont (WV)
  - 424th Medical Battalion (Multifunctional), in Newtown Square (PA)
    - Headquarters and Headquarters Detachment, in Newtown Square (PA)
    - 313th Medical Detachment (Combat and Operational Stress Control — COSC), at Joint Expeditionary Base Fort Story (VA)
    - 341st Medical Company (Logistics), in Newtown Square (PA)
    - 343rd Medical Company (Ground Ambulance), in Richmond (VA)
    - 379th Medical Detachment (Blood Support), in Newtown Square (PA)
    - 422nd Medical Detachment (Veterinary Services), in Rockville (MD)
    - 444th Medical Company (Ground Ambulance), in Beaver (WV)
    - 789th Medical Detachment (Preventive Medicine), at Joint Expeditionary Base Fort Story (VA)
    - 790th Medical Detachment (Preventive Medicine), in Rockville (MD)
    - 1493rd Medical Detachment (Combat and Operational Stress Control — COSC), in Cary (NC)

== Lineage and Honors ==
=== Lineage ===
- Constituted 27 June 1944 in the Army of the United States as the 59th Hospital Train
- Activated 24 August 1944 at Camp Grant, Illinois
- Inactivated 13 November 1945 at Camp Sibert, Alabama
- Redesignated 15 March 1948 as the 396th Hospital Train and allotted to the Organized Reserves
- Organized Reserves redesignated 25 March 1948 as the Organized Reserve Corps
- Activated 29 March 1948 at Connellsville, Pennsylvania
- Reorganized and redesignated 25 May 1950 as 338th Medical Group
- Location changed 5 July 1950 to Altoona, Pennsylvania
- Organized Reserve Corps redesignated 9 July 1952 as the Army Reserve
- Inactivated 28 April 1959 at Altoona, Pennsylvania
- Activated 1 November 1971 at Folsom, Pennsylvania
- Location changed 22 September 1995 to Chester, Pennsylvania
- Reorganized and redesignated 17 September 2002 as Headquarters and Headquarters Company, 338th Medical Brigade
- Location changed 30 June 2011 to Horsham, Pennsylvania

=== Honors ===
==== Campaign Participation Credit ====
- World War II
  - European-African-Middle Eastern Theater, Streamer without inscription
- War on Terrorism
  - Campaigns to be determined

=== Decorations ===
- None

== Insignia ==
=== Shoulder Sleeve Insignia ===
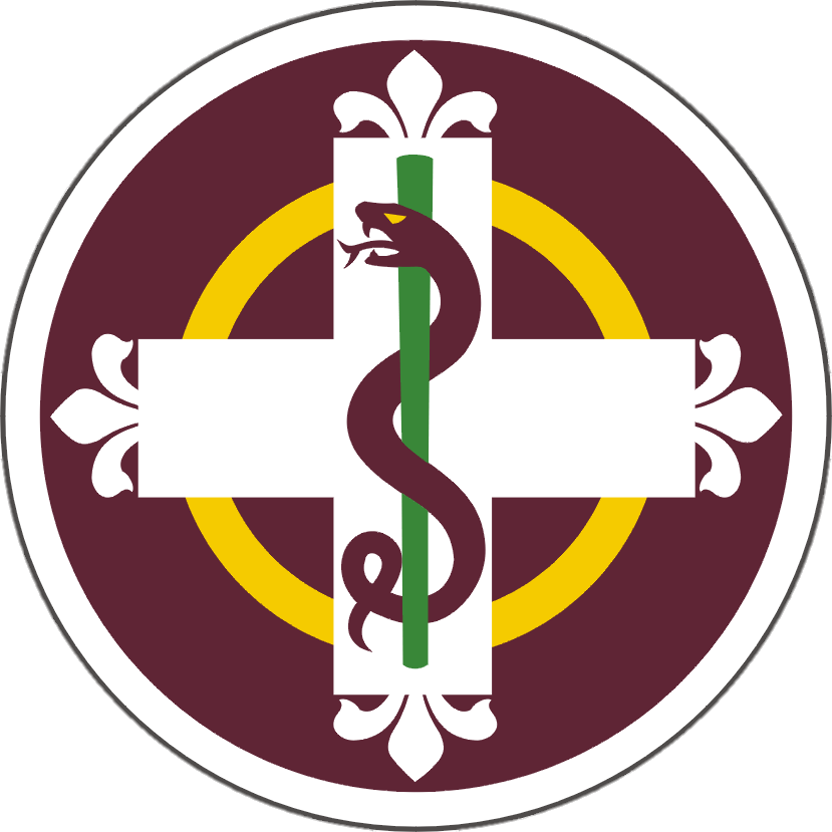
Shoulder Sleeve Insignia, 338th Medical Brigade

==== Description ====
On a maroon disc 2 3/4 inches (6.99 cm) in diameter a golden yellow annulet superimposed by a white cross fleuretty bearing a green rod entwined with a maroon serpent with a golden yellow eye, all enclosed with a 1/8 inch (.32 cm) white border.

==== Symbolism ====
Maroon and white are the colors of the Medical Corps. Gold is emblematic of excellence and high ideals. The ring alludes to a wheel or movement and represents the unit's service as a Hospital Train in World War II. The ring also highlights unity and cooperation. The cross is a symbol of aid and comfort. The demi-fleur-de-lis on the ends of the cross branches recall the organization's World War II history in Europe. The serpent entwined on the rod is called The Rod of Aesculapius and was the attribute of the Roman god of medicine and healing. Green is a color associated with healing and renewal.

==== Background ====
The shoulder sleeve insignia was approved effective 17 September 2002 for the 338th Medical Brigade. (TIOH Drawing Number A-1-849)

=== Distinctive Unit Insignia ===
Distinctive Unit Insignia, 338th Medical Brigade

==== Description ====
A gold color metal and enamel insignia 1 3/16 inches (3.02 cm) in height overall consisting of a white keystone surmounted by a scarlet Greek cross bearing in the center a gold locomotive wheel, all between a semicircular maroon scroll, folded back on each side, passing under the horizontal arms of the cross, and bearing at the top the inscription "SOUND BODY" and in base "SHARP MIND" all in gold letters.

==== Symbolism ====
The Greek cross is a symbol of aid and assistance. The keystone represents the location of the unit's headquarters in Pennsylvania. The locomotive wheel refers historically to the unit's service in England and France during World War II as the 59th Hospital Train. Maroon and white are colors used for the Army Medical Department.

==== Background ====
The distinctive unit insignia was originally approved for the 338th Medical Group on 29 November 1972. It was redesignated effective 17 September 2002, with description and symbolism updated for the 338th Medical Brigade.

== History ==
=== World War II ===
The 59th Hospital Train arrived in England on 6 September 1944. It was stationed near Swindon, England and never deployed to the continent. The hospital train redeployed to the United States aboard the MV Brastagi, a formerly Dutch flagged vessel which had been seized by the United States and was operated by the United States Merchant Marine. The train arrived at the Boston port of Debarkation on Sunday, 19 August 1945.

=== The Army Reserve ===
The first drill of the 396th Hospital Train was held on the evening of Tuesday, 11 May 1948 in the office of Dr. Joseph M. Forejt, Medical Corps, USAR, the newly appointed commander of the unit. Also attending were the unit's active-duty Unit Instructor, Major William P. Callaghan, First Lieutenant, Medical Service Corps, USAR, First Lieutenant Mary J. Ruble, Army Nurse Corps, USAR, Master Sergeant Theodore M. Hook, Staff Sergeant Edgar Sleasman, and Private First Class David R. Balsley.

The commander, Major Forejt, had been commissioned as a first lieutenant in the reserves before the Second World War and had been called to active duty on 1941. During the war, he served as the commanding officer of Company B, 327th Medical Battalion, the divisional medical support unit for the 102nd Infantry Division and also served overseas as the regimental surgeon of the 406th Infantry Regiment, 106th Infantry Division.

The first order of business for the cadre of the new unit was recruiting, as the unit was formed in a "no pay" status, meaning that members would not be paid for participation. The members present believed recruiting would not be a problem, as pending legislation would make all reserve units "paid" drilling positions. They also focused on the organization, supply, and function of the train itself.

== Commanders ==
| Image | Rank | Name | Branch | Begin date | End date | Notes |
|---|---|---|---|---|---|---|
| | Major | Charles T. C. Buczynski | MC | 24 August 1944 | 19 June 1945 | Reassigned to the 135th General Hospital. |
| | Captain | John G. Tucker | MC | 20 June 1945 | 1945 | In command in August 1945. |
| | | Inactive | | 14 November 1945 | 28 March 1948 | |
| | Major | Joseph M. Forejt | MC | 29 March 1948 | | |
| | Colonel | Ralph S. Metheny | MC | 25 May 1950 | | In command in 1950 and June 1951 |
| | Colonel | | | | | |
| | Colonel | | | | | |
| | Colonel | | | | | |
| | Colonel | Saul Fortunoff | MC | | | In command in 1956 and May 1957 |
| | | Inactive | | 29 April 1959 | 31 October 1971 | |
| | Colonel | Paul T. Milnamow | MC | 1 November 1971 | 1973 | Retired in 1973. |
| | Colonel | | | | | |
| | Colonel | William C. Beck | MC | | | In command in 1975 |
| | Colonel | Fae C. Adams | MC | 1 September 1976 | | |
| | Colonel | Randall W. Bell | MC | | | In command August 1979, August 1980; Retired as a Brigadier General |
| | Colonel | Richard C. Rushmore | DC | | 30 September 1984 | Previously commanded the 300th Field Hospital, received a Purple Heart in the Army Air Corps in World War II |
| | Colonel | | | | | |
| | Colonel | Donald F. Woolson | MC | | | In command in May 1991 |
| | Colonel | | | | | |
| | Colonel | | | | | |
| | Colonel | Joseph J. Mooney | | | | In command in 1998 |
| | Colonel | | | | | |
| | Colonel | | | | | |
| | Colonel | Lisa L. Doumont | AN | October 2011 | July 2013 | Retired as a Brigadier General. |
| | Colonel | Stephen T. Sauter | MC | July 2013 | September 2015 | Retired as a Brigadier General. |
| | Colonel | Nelson G. Rosen | MC | October 2015 | June 2018 | Retired as a Brigadier General |
| | Colonel | | | | | |
| | Colonel | | | | | |
| | Colonel | | | | | |

== Historic organization ==
=== 1976 ===
- Headquarters and Headquarters Detachment, 338th Medical Group
- 322nd General Hospital
- 348th General Hospital
- 361st Evacuation Hospital
- 300th Field Hospital
- 99th Combat Support Hospital
- 316th Station Hospital
- 183rd Medical Detachment
