= 3rd Theater Medical Command =

Medical command within the U.S. Army Reserve Command

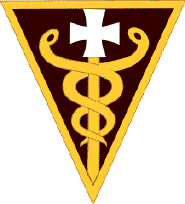
- Shoulder sleeve insignia
- Active: 5 May 1942-6 October 1945; 15 March 1991 – Present
- Country: United States
- Branch: United States Army Reserve
- Role: Medical
- Size: Command
- Part of: Army Reserve Medical Command
- Reserve Center: Forest Park, Georgia
- Nickname: ”Desert Medics"
- Motto: Frontline Surgeons
- Medical Corps colors: Maroon and White
- Engagements: World War II; Operation Desert Storm; Operation Iraqi Freedom; Operation Freedom Sentinel
- Decorations: Meritorious Unit Commendation

Commanders
- Current commander: Maj. Gen. Jennifer Marrast Host
- Command Sergeant Major: CSM Todd Kaim

Insignia
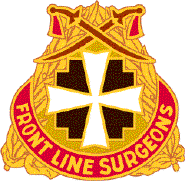
- Distinctive unit insignia

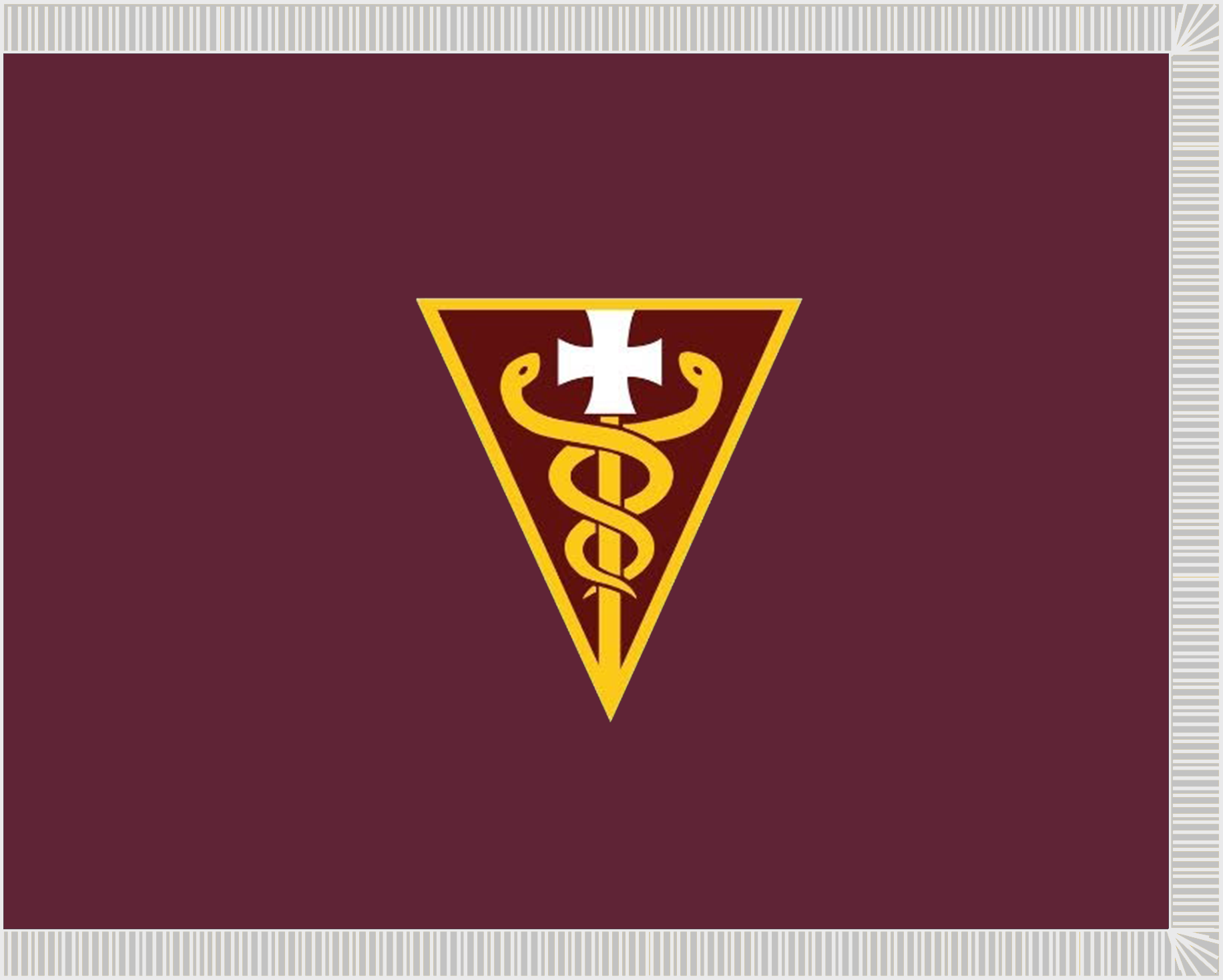
- 3rd Medical Command Flag

The 3rd Theater Medical Command (3 TMC) or "Desert Medics" is headquartered in Atlanta, GA and manages all the Army Reserve deployable field medical units east of Ohio. While the 807th MCDS covers the MTOE medical units to the west and ARMEDCOM provides command and control for all the Table of Distribution and Allowance (TDA) medical units within CONUS.

Units of the 3rd TMC provide general, surgical, dental, ambulance, behavioral health, preventive medicine, and veterinary support to Army units and to civilian populations.

== Current organization ==
The 3rd Theater Medical Command is a subordinate functional command of the United States Army Reserve Command. As of January 2026, the command oversees all operational reserve medical units east of the Mississippi river and in Louisiana. As of January 2026, the command consists of the following units:

- 3rd Theater Medical Command, at Fort Gillem (GA)
  - Headquarters and Headquarters Company, 3rd Theater Medical Command, at Fort Gillem (GA)
  - 6th Medical Logistics Management Center — Army Reserve Element, at Fort Detrick (MD)
  - 5th Medical Brigade, in Birmingham (AL)
    - 429th Medical Battalion (Multifunctional), in Savannah (GA)
    - 810th Hospital Center, in Tuscaloosa (AL)
  - 8th Medical Brigade, at Fort Wadsworth (NY)
    - 439th Medical Battalion (Multifunctional), at Joint Base McGuire–Dix–Lakehurst (NJ)
    - 818th Hospital Center, in Utica (NY)
  - 332nd Medical Brigade, in Nashville (TN)
    - 411th Hospital Center, in Jacksonville (FL)
  - 338th Medical Brigade, at Biddle Air National Guard Base (PA)
    - 410th Hospital Center, at Fort Meade (MD)
    - 424th Medical Battalion (Multifunctional), in Newtown Square (PA)
  - 804th Medical Brigade, at Fort Devens (MA)
    - 803rd Hospital Center, at Fort Devens (MA)

== Historic organization ==
=== Operation Desert Storm ===
- 3rd Medical Command
  - 566th Medical Company
  - 45th Medical Company (Air Ambulance)
  - 173rd Medical Group
    - 8th Evacuation Hospital
      - 663rd Medical Detachment (Surgical)
    - 85th Evacuation Hospital
      - 420th Medical Detachment (Orthopedic)
    - 201st Evacuation Hospital
    - 207th Evacuation Hospital
      - 386th Medical Detachment (Neurosurgery)
    - 47th Field Hospital
    - 300th Field Hospital
    - 120th Medical Battalion
      - 675th Medical Detachment (Dispensary)
      - 1291h Medical Company (Clearing)
      - 216th Medical Company (Ambulance)
      - 348th Medical Detachment (Air Ambulance)
      - 872nd Medical Detachment (Air Ambulance)
  - 202nd Medical Group
    - 129th Evacuation Hospital
    - 311th Evacuation Hospital
    - 365th Evacuation Hospital
    - 927th Medical Company
  - 244th Medical Group
    - 50th General Hospital
      - 423rd Medical Laboratory (Veterinary Services)
      - 996th Medical Laboratory
    - 316th Station Hospital
      - 989th Medical Detachment (Surgery)
    - 382nd Field Hospital
      - 467th Medical Detachment (Psychiatry)
      - 357th Medical Detachment (Neurosurgery)
    - 144th Evacuation Hospital
    - 217th Evacuation Hospital
    - 92nd Medical Battalion
      - 17th Medical Detachment (General Dispensary)
      - 947th Medical Company (Clearing)
      - 134th Medical Company (Ambulance)
      - 336th Medical Detachment (Air Ambulance)
  - 803rd Medical Group
    - 114th Evacuation Hospital
    - 251st Evacuation Hospital
      - 181st Medical Detachment (Thoracic Surgery)
      - 395th Medical Detachment (Orthopedics)
      - 904th Medical Detachment (Neurosurgery)
      - 424th Medical Laboratory
    - 350th Evacuation Hospital
    - 109th Medical Battalion
      - 75th Medical Detachment (Dispensary Small)
      - 914th Medical Detachment (Dispensary Small)
      - 477th Medical Company (Ambulance)
      - 812th Medical Company (Air Ambulance)
      - 343rd Medical Detachment (Air Ambulance)
      - 986th Medical Detachment (Air Ambulance)
  - 2nd Medical Detachment (Dental Headquarters)
    - 122nd Medical Detachment (Dental Services)
    - 123rd Medical Detachment (Dental Services)
  - 379th Medical Detachment (Blood Headquarters)
    - 448th Medical Detachment (Blood Processing)
  - 320th Medical Detachment (Veterinary Headquarters)
    - 356th Medical Detachment (Veterinary Service)
    - 422nd Medical Detachment (Veterinary Service)
    - 483rd Medical Detachment (Veterinary Small Animal)
      - 888th Medical Detachment (Veterinary Small Animal)
  - 12th Medical Detachment (Preventive Medicine)
    - 714th Medical Detachment (Entomology)
    - 105th Medical Detachment (Environmental Engineering)
    - 983rd Medical Detachment (Environmental Sanitation)
  - US Army Medical Materiel Center, Saudi Arabia (USAMMCSWA)
    - 47th Medical Supply, Optical, and Maintenance (MEDSOM) Battalion
      - 980th MEDSOM Battalion
      - 249th Medical Detachment (Supply Team )
      - 49th Medical Detachment (Medical Maintenance)
      - 153rd Medical Detachment (Inventory Control)
      - 605th Medical Detachment (Blood Distribution)
      - 655th Medical Detachment (Blood Storage)
    - 145th MEDSOM Battalion
      - 402nd Medical Detachment (Inventory Control)
      - 220th Medical Detachment (Medical Maintenance)

== Lineage ==
3rd Medical Command Headquarters and Headquarters Company was constituted 21 December 1928, in the Regular Army as the 3rd Auxiliary Surgical Group.

Activated 5 May 1942, at Fort Sam Houston, Texas.

Reorganized and redesignated 1 August 1945, as the 896th Medical Professional Service.

Inactivated 6 October 1945, in Germany.

Redesignated 16 March 1991, as Headquarters and Headquarters Company, 3rd Medical Command.

Activated in Saudi Arabia with personnel from Headquarters Company, 3rd Medical Command (Provisional) organized 16 September 1990 in Saudi Arabia.

The ARCENT Medical Group (Provisional) was established on 5 or 6 December 1990 by ARCENT Permanent Order 262-1 (Dinackus writes 5 December 1990).

On 29 December 1990 ARCENT Permanent Order 273-1 amended that order to create the United States Army Forces Central Command Medical Command (Provisional). It appears the order was issued on 26 March, to be made effective (implemented) on 29 December.

In order to provide the additional staff required for Headquarters, ARCENT Medical Command (Provisional), the staff of the 202nd Medical Group, an Army National Guard unit from Florida, was combined with the staff of the ARCENT Medical Group (Provisional).

On 5 March 1991, Forces Command Permanent Order 31-1 activated the 3rd Medical Command effective 15 March 1991. While not technically a re-designation, the personnel and equipment of the ARCENT Medical Command (Provisional) were 'reflagged' as the 3rd Medical Command.

== Unit insignia ==
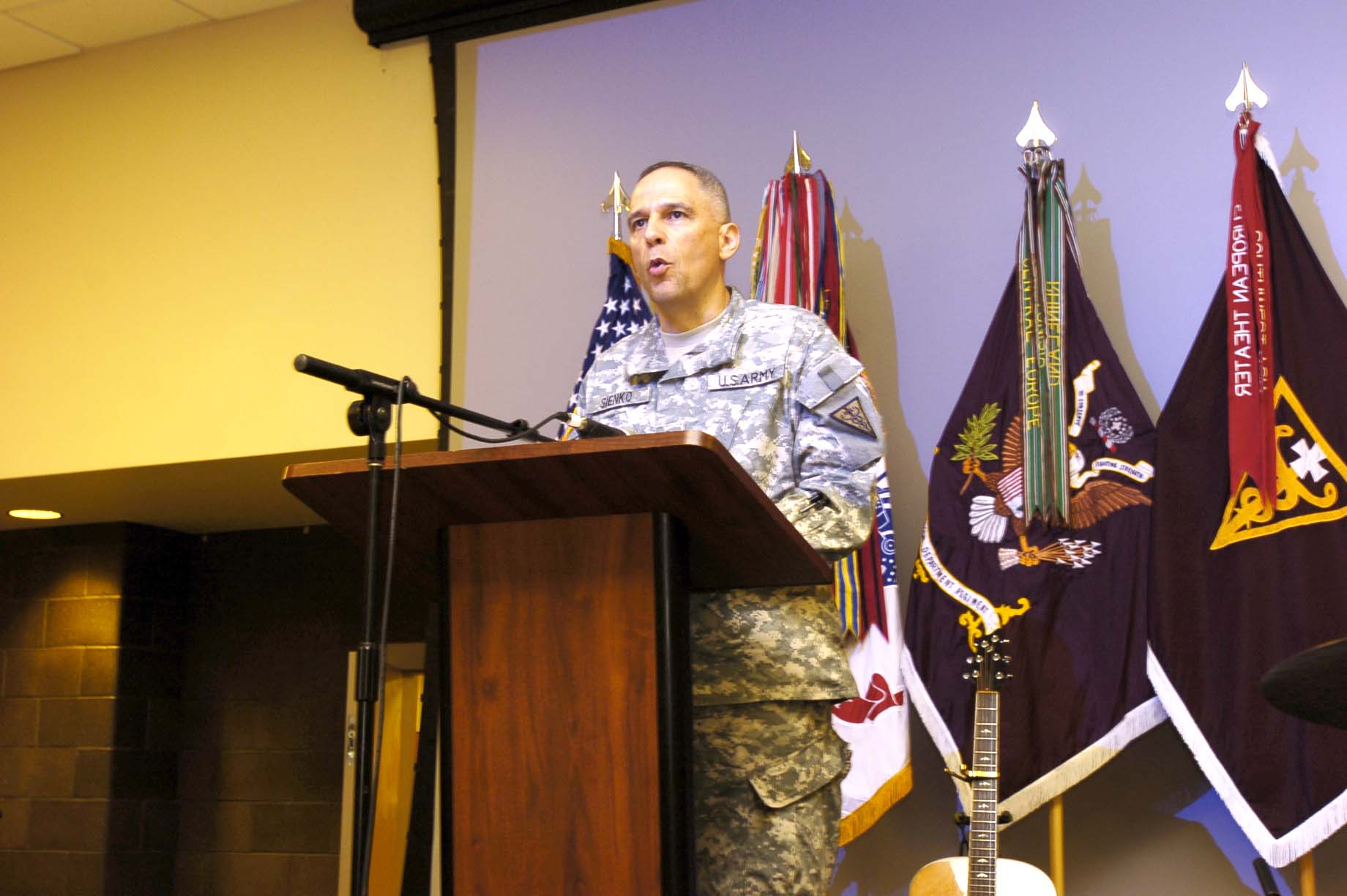
Maj. Gen. Dean Sienko, commander, 3rd Medical Command Deployment Support (MDSC) at the Fort Gillem Patriot Day Ceremony 11 Sept.

=== Shoulder sleeve insignia (SSI) ===
==== Description ====
On a maroon triangle, one point down, with a 1/8 inch (0.32 cm) yellow border, 3 inches (7.6 cm) in height and 2 3/4 inches (7.0 cm) in width overall, two yellow serpents with maroon eyes entwined upon a yellow staff with a white Maltese cross at top.

==== Symbolism ====
Maroon and white are colors traditionally associated with the Medical Corps. The designation of the Command is denoted by the triangular shape of the insignia. The staff and serpents refer to medical service and the Maltese cross recalls the unit's heritage of support in combat. Yellow/gold stands for excellence.

==== Background ====
The shoulder sleeve insignia was authorized on 12 June 1992. (TIOH Drawing Number A-1-800)

=== Distinctive unit insignia (DUI) ===
==== Description ====
A gold color metal and enamel device 1 1/8 inches (2.9 cm) in height overall, consisting of a maroon cross surmounted by a white Maltese cross; on either side a gold spring of laurel conjoined at top and surmounted at top by two brown scimitars crossed diagonally points down with red tassels; at bottom an arced red scroll inscribed "FRONT LINE SURGEONS" in gold letters.

==== Symbolism ====
Maroon and white are colors traditionally associated with the Medical Corps. The maroon cross stands for Army medicine while the Maltese cross recalls the 3rd Medical Command's heritage of service and sacrifice in the field. The laurel sprigs, signifying honor and achievement, recall the unit's World War II campaigns and service. They simulate an arrowhead recalling the unit's assault landing in Sicily, while forming a triangle highlighting the unit's numerical designation. The scimitars represent the unit's participation in the two Southwest Asia Campaigns. Gold stands for excellence, red for courage and sacrifice.

==== Background ====
The distinctive unit insignia was authorized on 27 July 1992

== Unit honors ==
=== World War II ===
- Tunisia
- Sicily (with Arrowhead)
- Normandy (with Arrowhead)
- Northern France
- Ardennes-Alcase
- Rhineland
- Central Europe

=== Southwest Asia ===
- Defense of Saudi Arabia
- Liberation and Defense of Kuwait
- Southwest Asia Cease-Fire

=== Global War on Terrorism ===
- Operation Enduring Freedom (OEF)
- Iraqi Freedom (OIF)

=== Iraq ===
- National Resolution
- Iraqi Surge
- Iraqi Sovereignty

=== Unit awards ===
Meritorious Unit Commendation:

- EUROPEAN THEATER 1944
- SOUTHWEST ASIA 1990–1991
- SOUTHWEST ASIA 2009–2010
- SOUTHWEST ASIA 2012–2013 (Detachment)
