= United States Military Entrance Processing Command =

Major command of the U.S. Department of Defense

United States Military Entrance Processing Command (USMEPCOM)
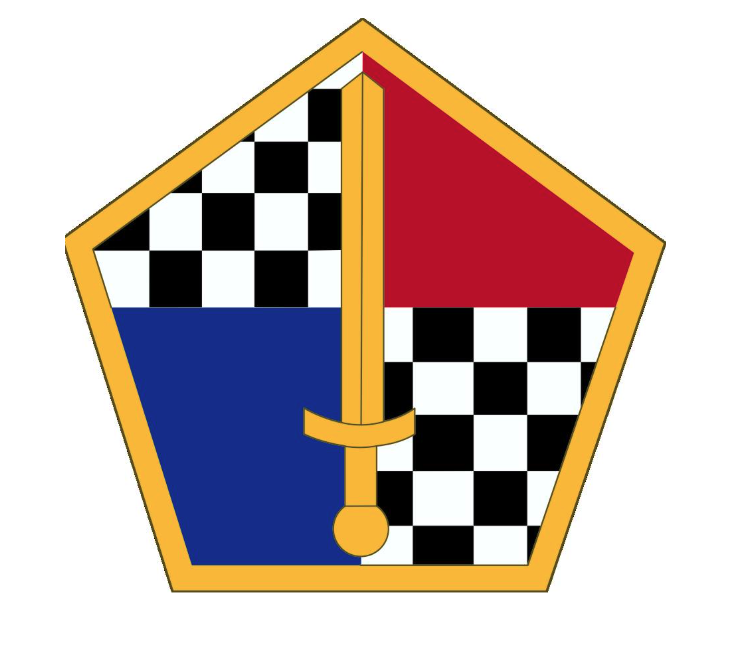
- United States Military Entrance Processing Command SSI
- Founded: 1983
- Country: United States
- Part of: U.S. Department of Defense
- Garrison/HQ: Naval Station Great Lakes, Illinois
- Motto: "Freedom's Front Door"
- Website: https://www.mepcom.army.mil/

Commanders
- Current commander: Colonel Frankie C. Cochiaosue
- Command Sergeant Major: Command Sergeant Major Yveline Symonette

Insignia
- Distinctive unit insignia

- Flag

The United States Military Entrance Processing Command (USMEPCOM or MEPCOM) is a major command of the U.S. Department of Defense. The organization screens and processes enlisted recruits into the U.S. Armed Forces in the 65 Military Entrance Processing Stations (MEPS) it operates throughout the United States.

== Mission ==
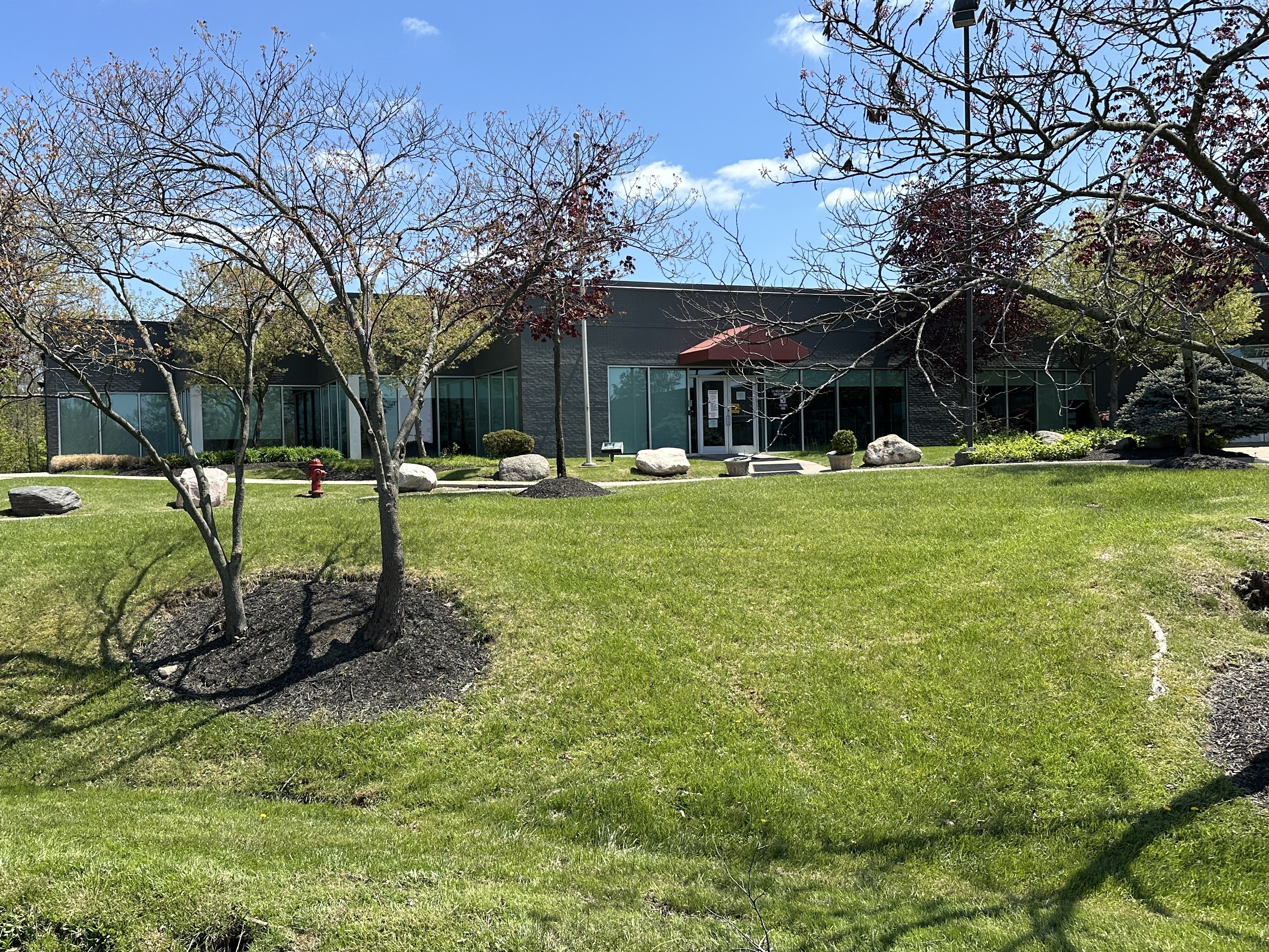
Military Entrance Processing Station in Columbus, Ohio

Swearing in at a US Military Entrance Processing Station

USMEPCOM is headquartered in North Chicago, Illinois and operates 65 Military Entrance Processing Stations (MEPS) located throughout the United States. Effective 1 January 1982, the Assistant Secretary of the Army changed the processing stations' names from Armed Forces Examining and Entrance Stations (AFEES) to MEPS. The command's motto is Freedom's Front Door, signifying that a service member's military career starts when they walk through the doors of the MEPS.

USMEPCOM is a joint service command under the direction of the Deputy Assistant Secretary of Defense for Military Personnel Policy, who in turn reports to the under secretary of defense for personnel and readiness.

MEPS process applicants for military service, putting them through a battery of tests and examinations to ensure that they meet the standards required to serve in the United States Armed Forces. These tests include vision, hearing, blood, and blood pressure tests, a pregnancy test (for women), an examination by a doctor, a height and weight check, urinalysis, a breathalyzer test, a moral/background examination, as well as the Armed Services Vocational Aptitude Battery (ASVAB). If applicants are deemed qualified for military service, they will also meet with a service counselor, negotiate and sign enlistment contracts, and swear or affirm an entrance oath.

USMEPCOM has been awarded the Joint Meritorious Unit Award three times. The first award was for the period of 1 July 1982 until 30 April 1985; the second award was for the period of 1 January 2005 until 31 December 2007; and the third award was for the period of 16 April 2016 until 24 May 2019.

USMEPCOM does not process commissioned officer candidates entering the U.S. Armed Forces through the five U.S. service academies or college and university ROTC programs.

College/university graduate candidates for the services' various officer candidate schools and USAF officer training school accession programs will initially process via a station of USMEPCOM if they have no prior active or inactive military service or if they have not been previously medically qualified while on a military contract through another commissioning program such as that prior to the final two years of college/university level ROTC.

== List of processing stations (MEPS) ==
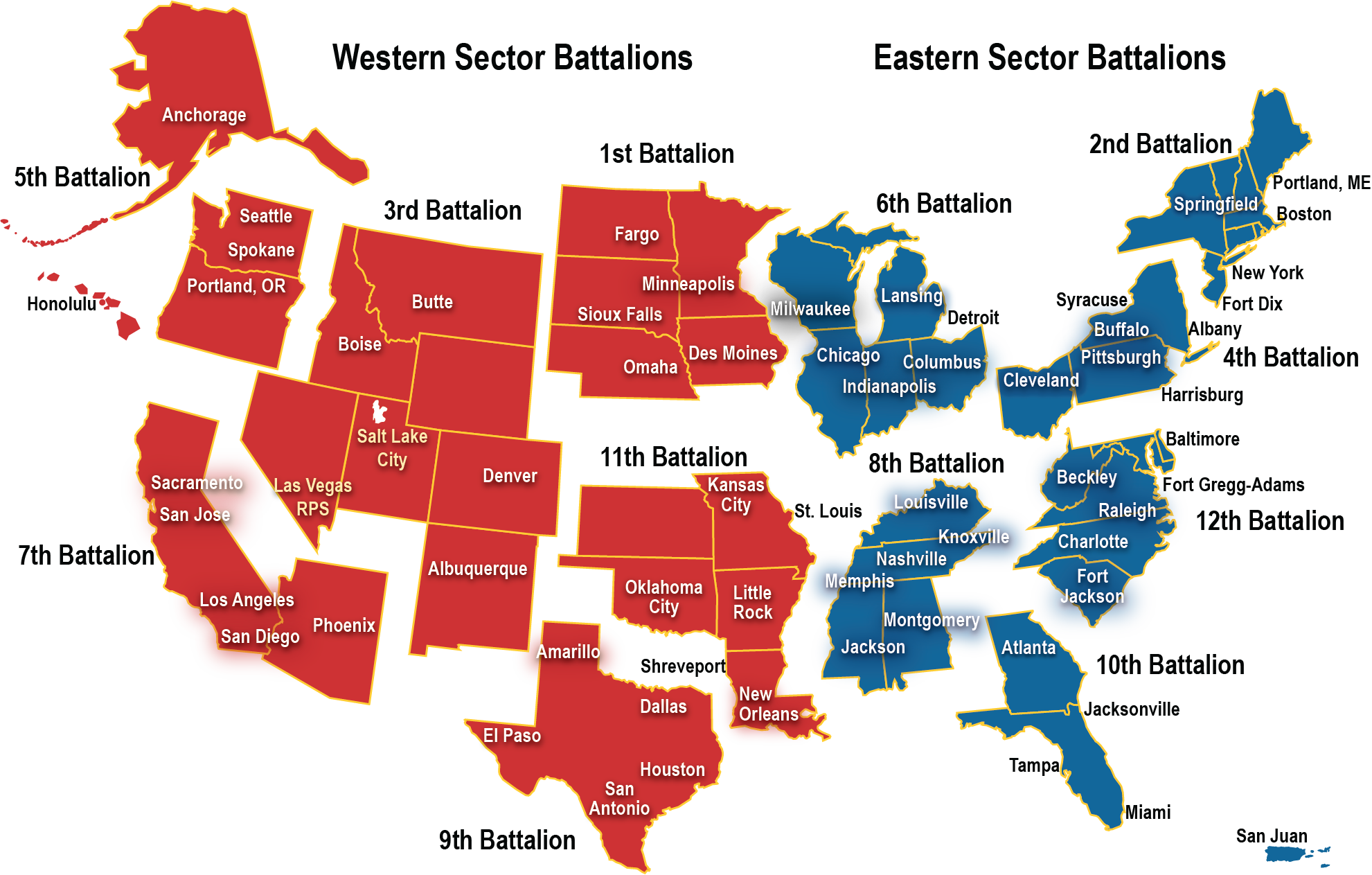
Military Entrance Processing Stations

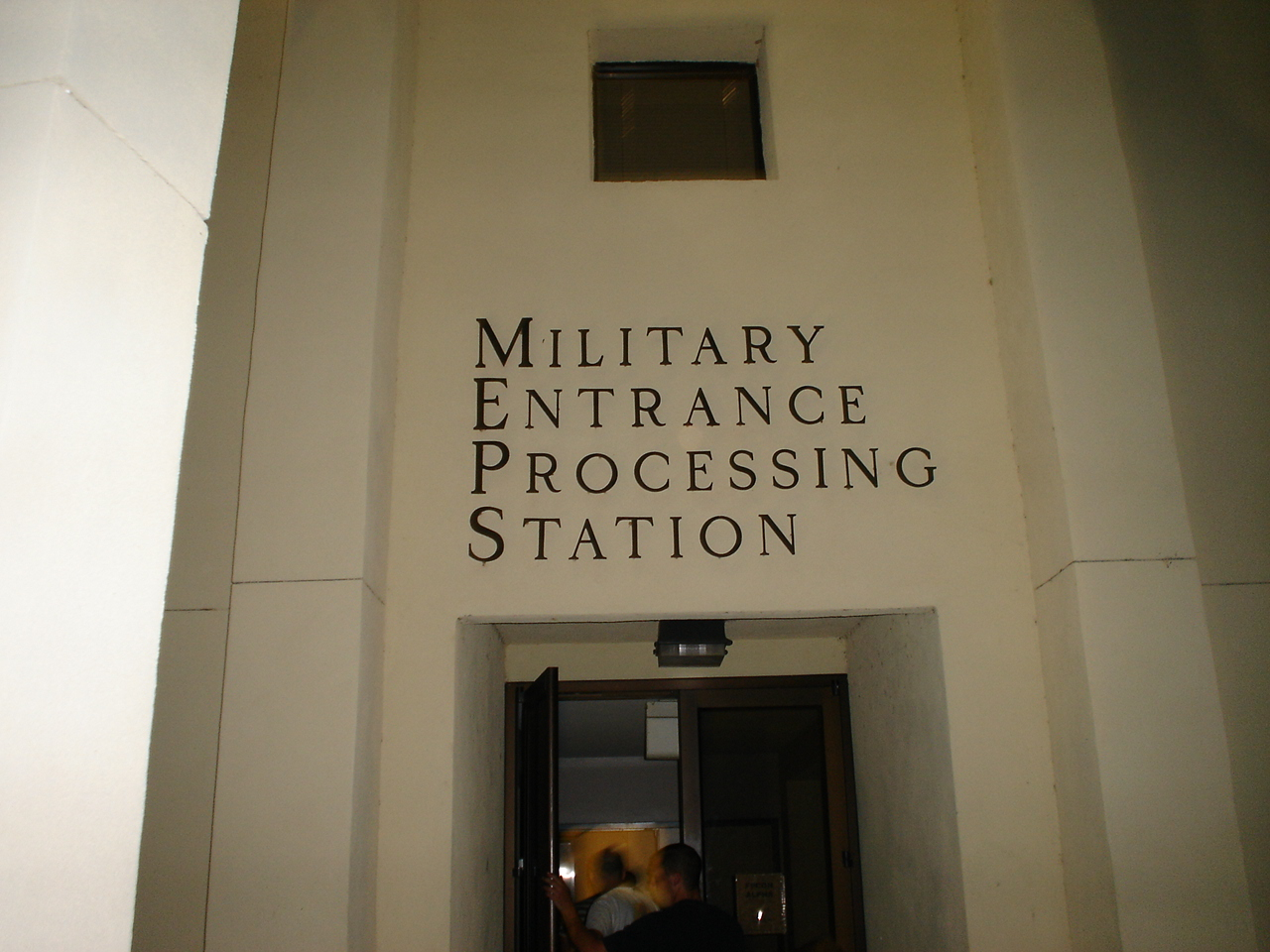
MEPS in Montgomery, Alabama

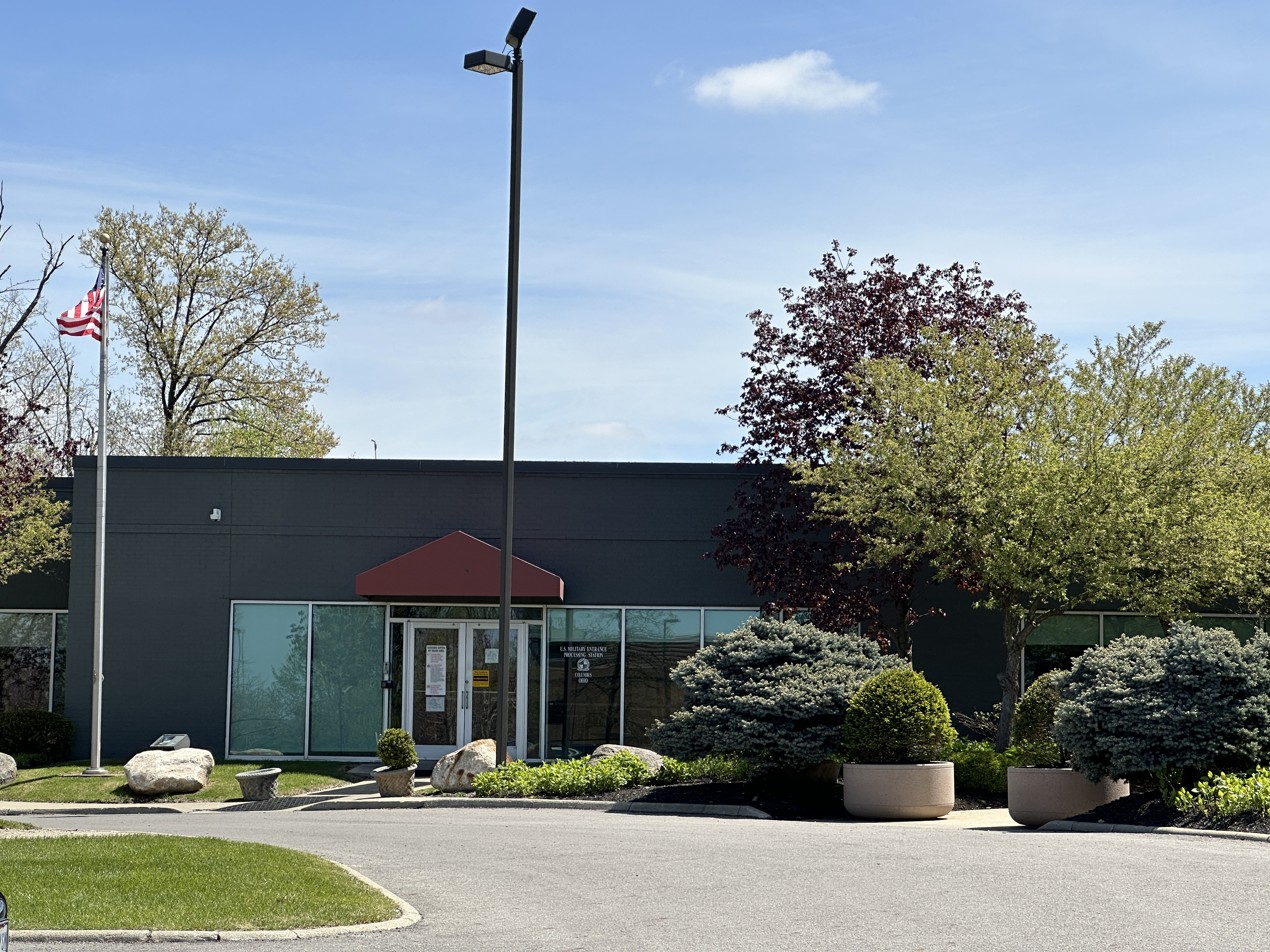
Military Entrance Processing Station in Columbus, Ohio

=== Eastern Sector ===
- Albany, New York
- Atlanta, Georgia (Fort Gillem)
- Baltimore, Maryland (Fort Meade)
- Beckley, West Virginia
- Boston, Massachusetts
- Buffalo, New York (Niagara Falls Air Reserve Base)
- Charlotte, North Carolina
- Chicago, Illinois
- Cleveland, Ohio
- Columbus, Ohio
- Detroit, Michigan now in Troy, Michigan
- Fort Dix, New Jersey
- Fort Jackson, South Carolina
- Fort Lee, Virginia
- Harrisburg, Pennsylvania (Ronald Reagan Federal Building and Courthouse)
- Indianapolis, Indiana
- Jackson, Mississippi
- Jacksonville, Florida
- Knoxville, Tennessee
- Lansing, Michigan
- Louisville, Kentucky
- Memphis, Tennessee
- Miami, Florida
- Milwaukee, Wisconsin
- Montgomery, Alabama (Maxwell Air Force Base)
- Nashville, Tennessee
- New York City
- Pittsburgh, Pennsylvania (William S. Moorehead Federal Building)
- Portland, Maine
- Raleigh, North Carolina
- San Juan, Puerto Rico
- Springfield, Massachusetts (Westover Air Force Reserve Base)
- Syracuse, New York (Hancock Field Air National Guard Base)
- Tampa, Florida

=== Western Sector ===
- Albuquerque, New Mexico
- Amarillo, Texas
- Anchorage, Alaska
- Boise, Idaho
- Butte, Montana
- Dallas, Texas (Federal Building)
- Denver, Colorado (New Customs House)
- Des Moines, Iowa
- El Paso, Texas (Fort Bliss)
- Fargo, North Dakota
- Honolulu, Hawaii
- Houston, Texas
- Kansas City, Missouri
- Las Vegas, Nevada (Remote Processing Station)
- Little Rock, Arkansas
- Los Angeles, California
- Minneapolis, Minnesota (Bishop Henry Whipple Federal Building)
- New Orleans, Louisiana
- Oklahoma City, Oklahoma (Federal Building)
- Omaha, Nebraska
- Phoenix, Arizona
- Portland, Oregon
- Riverside, California (Remote Processing Station)
- Sacramento, California
- Salt Lake City, Utah
- San Antonio, Texas (Fort Sam Houston)
- San Diego, California
- San Jose, California
- Seattle, Washington (Federal Center South)
- Shreveport, Louisiana
- Sioux Falls, South Dakota
- Spokane, Washington
- St. Louis, Missouri (Robert A. Young Federal Building)
