= 332nd Medical Brigade =

- Shoulder sleeve insignia
- Active: 1927-1945; 1948-1959; 1985-Present
- Country: United States
- Branch: United States Army Reserve
- Type: Medical brigade
- Size: Brigade
- Part of: 3rd Medical Command
- Garrison/HQ: Nashville, Tennessee
- Colors: Maroon and White
- Engagements: World War II-ETO; Persian Gulf War

Insignia
- Distinctive unit insignia

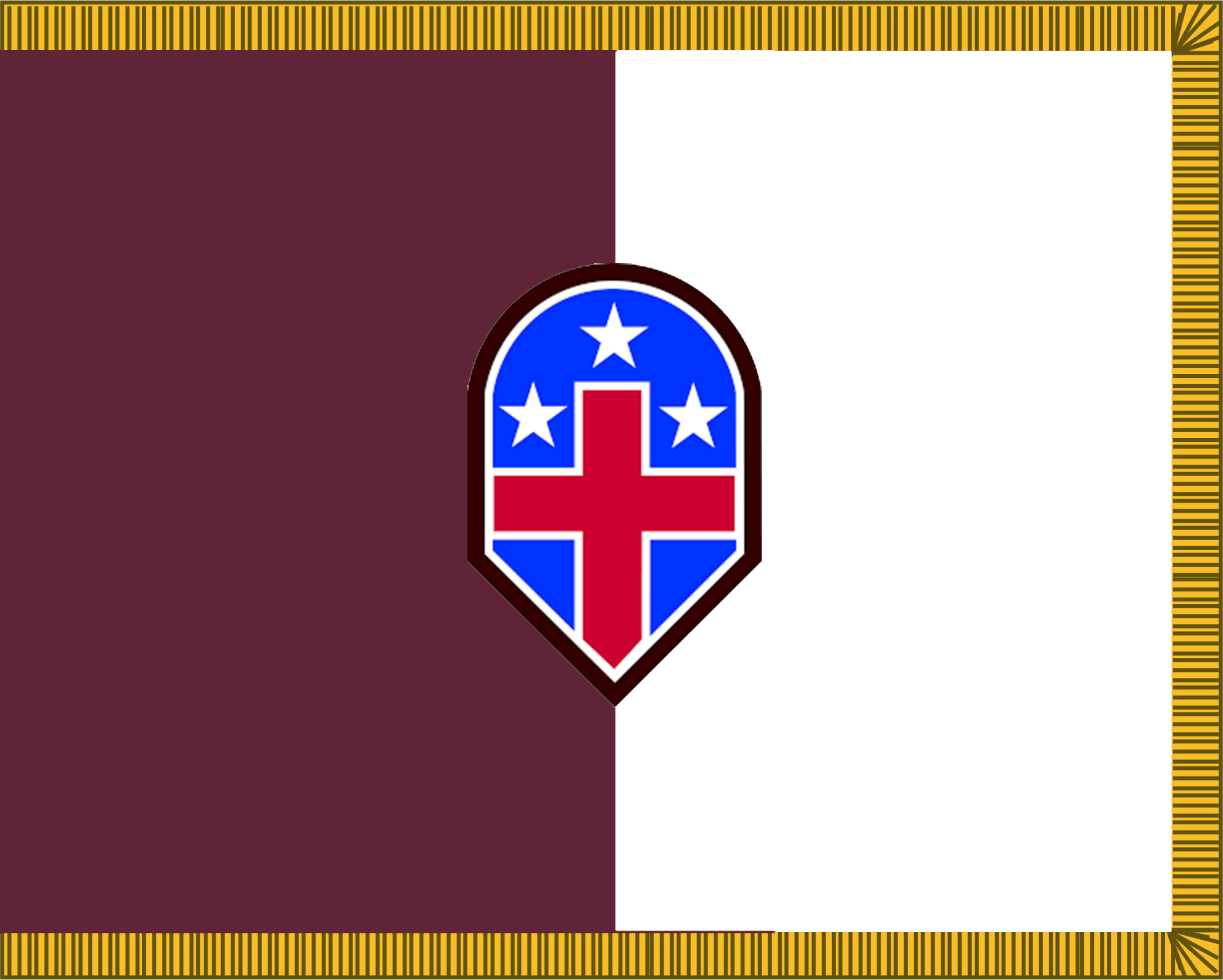
- 332nd Medical Brigade Flag

The 332nd Medical Brigade is a medical brigade of the United States Army Reserve subordinate to the 3rd Medical Command and headquartered in Nashville, Tennessee.

== Current organization ==
The 332nd Medical Brigade is a subordinate unit of the 3rd Theater Medical Command. As of January 2026 the brigade consists of the following units:

- 332nd Medical Brigade, in Nashville (TN)
  - Headquarters and Headquarters Company, 332nd Medical Brigade, in Nashville (TN)
  - 169th Medical Detachment (Veterinary Services), at Fort Gordon (GA)
  - 195th Medical Detachment (Veterinary Services), in Baton Rouge (LA)
  - 326th Medical Detachment (Combat and Operational Stress Control — COSC), in Perrine (FL)
  - 342nd Medical Detachment (Preventive Medicine), in Gainesville (FL)
  - 387th Medical Company (Logistics), in Perrine (FL)
  - 411th Medical Company (Ground Ambulance), in Millington (TN)
  - 452nd Medical Detachment (Preventive Medicine), in Perrine (FL)
  - 788th Medical Detachment (Preventive Medicine), in St. Petersburg (FL)
  - 810th Dental Company (Area Support), in Cary (NC)
    - Detachment 1, 810th Dental Company (Area Support), at Joint Base Charleston (SC)
  - 1437th Medical Detachment (Preventive Medicine) in Gainesville (FL)
  - 411th Hospital Center, in Jacksonville (FL)
    - Headquarters and Headquarters Detachment, in Jacksonville (FL)
    - 301st Field Hospital (32 Bed), in St. Petersburg (FL)
      - Headquarters and Headquarters Detachment, in St. Petersburg (FL)
      - 319th Medical Detachment (Minimal Care), in Pinellas Park (FL)
      - 331st Medical Detachment (Minimal Care), in Perrine (FL)
      - 343rd Medical Detachment (Hospital Augmentation, Intermediate Care Ward 60 Bed), in St. Petersburg (FL)
    - 345th Field Hospital (32 Bed), in Jacksonville (FL)
      - Headquarters and Headquarters Detachment, in Jacksonville (FL)
      - 349th Medical Detachment (Hospital Augmentation, Medical 32 Bed), in Jacksonville (FL)
      - 369th Medical Detachment (Hospital Augmentation, Intermediate Care Ward 60 Bed), in Jacksonville (FL)
      - 481st Medical Detachment (Hospital Augmentation, Surgical 24 Bed), in Jacksonville (FL)
      - 874th Medical Detachment Team (Forward Resuscitative and Surgical), at Fort Jackson (SC)
      - 1878th Medical Detachment Team (Hospital Augmentation, Head and Neck), in Jacksonville (FL)

== Lineage and Honors ==
=== Lineage ===
- Constituted 18 October 1927 in the Regular Army as Headquarters and Service Company, 19th Medical Regiment
- Organized 23 March 1928 with Headquarters at Chicago, Illinois
- Redesignated 28 May 1941 as Headquarters and Service Company, 69th Medical Regiment
- Called to Active Duty 25 September 1942 at Camp Maxey, Texas
- Reorganized and redesignated 4 September 1943 as Headquarters and Headquarters Detachment, 69th Medical Group
- Inactivated 1 November 1945 at Fort Bragg, North Carolina
- Reorganized and redesignated 5 October 1948 as Headquarters and Headquarters Detachment, 332nd Medical Group and allotted to the Organized Reserve Corps
- Activated 19 October 1948 at Savannah, Georgia
- (Organized Reserve Corps redesignated 9 July 1952 as the Army Reserve)
- Inactivated 25 June 1959 at Savannah Georgia
- Redesignated 16 May 1985 as Headquarters and Headquarters Company, 332nd Medical Brigade and activated at Nashville, Tennessee

=== Honors ===
==== Campaign Participation Credit ====
- World War II:
  - Normandy
  - Northern France
  - Rhineland
  - Ardennes-Alsace
  - Central Europe
- Southwest Asia:
  - Defense of Saudi Arabia
  - Liberation of Kuwait

=== Decorations ===
- Meritorious Unit Commendation, Streamer embroidered EUROPEAN THEATER
- Army Superior Unit Award, Streamer embroidered 2020. Permanent Order 293-0004, dtd 20 October 2023.

== Insignia ==
=== Shoulder Sleeve Insignia ===
Shoulder Sleeve Insignia, 332nd Medical Brigade

==== Description ====
On a blue field edged white within a 1/8 inch (.32 cm) maroon border, 2 inches (5.08 cm) in width and 3 inches (7.62 cm) in height overall, semicircular at top with vertical sides and a 90 degree point to base, three white five-pointed stars above a white-edged scarlet cross issuant from base with lateral arms throughout.

==== Symbolism ====
The white stars on a blue field refer to the State Flag of Tennessee, the unit's home area and the V-shape of the base alludes to the nickname, "Volunteer State." The scarlet cross is symbolic of medical care and the colors white and maroon are traditionally associated with the Army Medical Department. The outer shape is symbolic of medicine and surgery, the rounded top suggesting a capsule of medicine and the pointed bottom the edge of a scalpel.

==== Background ====
The shoulder sleeve insignia was approved on 5 August 1985. (TIOH Dwg. No. A-1-713)

=== Distinctive Unit Insignia ===
Distinctive Unit Insignia, 332nd Medical Brigade

==== Description ====
A silver color metal and enamel device 1 1/8 inches (2.86 cm) in height overall consisting of a silver fleur-de-lis with blue center petal and silver centerline between two stylized evergreens, and centered overall a maroon cross patée the arms embattled and charged at center with a small silver cross couped.

==== Symbolism ====
Maroon and white are the colors associated with the Army Medical Department. The unit's World War II campaign service is symbolized by the fleur-de-lis in blue and silver representing the campaigns of Normandy and Northern France; the evergreens allude to the Ardennes Alsace campaign. The embattled turrets forming the cross suggest the castles of the Rhineland, and the Central Europe campaign is denoted by the silver cross at center. The Meritorious Unit streamer awarded for service in the European Theater is also represented by the embattled maroon cross.

==== Background ====
The distinctive unit insignia was approved on 22 October 1985.

=== Combat Service Identification Badge ===
==== Description/Blazon ====
A silver color metal and enamel device 2 inches (5.08 cm) in height consisting of a design similar to the shoulder sleeve insignia.

== History ==
=== The Early Years ===
The 19th Medical Regiment was constituted in the Regular Army on 18 October 1927, allotted to the Sixth Corps Area, and assigned to the VI Corps. The regiment was organized on 23 March 1928 with Organized Reserve personnel as a "Regular Army Inactive" unit with headquarters at Chicago, Illinois. Assigned reserve personnel were from the states of Michigan, Wisconsin, and Illinois. The regiment conducted summer training most years at the Fort Snelling station hospital; its designated mobilization station was Fort Oglethorpe, Georgia. On 29 May 1941 the regiment was redesignated as the 69th Medical Regiment.

== Commanders ==
Image	Rank	Name	Branch	Begin date	End date	Notes
	Captain	Tom F. Beveridge	MC, ORC	28 March 1928	11 April 1928	
	Major	Isaac F. Clark	MC, ORC	11 April 1928	15 October 1928	
	Lieutenant Colonel	W. Lee Hart	MC, ORC	15 October 1928	12 August 1930	
	Major	Isaac F. Clark	MC, ORC	12 August 1930	October 1930	
		Unknown		October 1930	June 1932	
	Colonel	Henry W. Lang	MC, ORC	June 1932	12 October 1936	
		Unknown		12 October 1936	September 1938	
	Captain	Louis Fishman	MC, ORC	September 1938	January 1940	
		Unknown		January 1940	24 September 1942	
	Captain	William Pearson	MC	25 September 1942		Described as "first commander," probably after mobilization, as regiment was brought to full strength.
	Major	Phillip A. Bergman	MC			In command in November 1942; approved 69th Medical Regiment DUI
	Colonel	Richard L. Daniel	MC		3 September 1943	Commander of the 69th Medical Regiment when it was broken up.
	Lieutenant Colonel	Phillip A. Bergman	MC	4 September 1943	10 October 1943	Previously served as executive officer of the 69th Medical Regiment; Became executive officer when Colonel Crall assumed command
	Colonel	Herbert D. Crall	MC	11 October 1943	17 October 1944	Colonel Crall was severely injured in a vehicle accident on 17 October 1944, and was evacuated to the United States.
	Lieutenant Colonel	Phillip A. Bergman	MC	18 October 1944	18 October 1945	Transferred to separation point for discharge
	Major	Kenneth W. Price	MAC	19 October 1945	1 November 1945	
		Inactive		2 November 1945	18 October 1948	
	Colonel					
	Colonel					
	Colonel					
	Colonel					
	Colonel					
	Colonel					
		Inactive		26 June 1959	15 May 1985	
	Colonel	Nat E. Hyder	MC	16 May 1985		
	Brigadier General	Michael David Strong, III	MC	November 1987	May 1991	Deployed the Brigade to Southwest Asia in support of VII Corps; Retired as a Major General.
	Brigadier General	Ralph L. Haynes	MC	October 1991	June 1994	Retired as a Major General.
	Brigadier General	Jamie S. Barkin	MC	June 1994	7 June 1998	Retired as a Major General.
	Brigadier General	Richard D. Lynch	MC	7 June 1998	May 2001	
	Brigadier General	Michael H. Walter	MC	May 2001	May 2005	
	Brigadier General	Margaret C. Wilmoth	AN	May 2005	13 September 2008	Retired as a Major General.
	Colonel	James Snyder		13 September 2008		
	Colonel					
	Colonel					
	Colonel					
	Colonel					
	Colonel					
	Colonel	Jerry L. Tolbert	MC	23 June 2018	15 August 2020	
	Colonel	Bryan V. Stevens	SP	16 August 2020	18 August 2021	Interim; Subsequently Assumed Command of the 307th Medical Brigade
	Colonel	Gregory Frazier	AN	19 August 2021		
	Colonel	Rob Gerlach	MS			
	Colonel					

== Historic organization ==
=== 1928 - 1936 ===
- Headquarters & Support Company, 19th Medical Regiment
- 19th Veterinary Company
- Headquarters, Ambulance Battalion
  - 55th Ambulance Company
  - 56th Ambulance Company
  - 57th Ambulance Company
- Headquarters, Hospital Battalion
  - 55th Hospital Company
  - 56th Hospital Company
  - 57th Hospital Company
- Headquarters, Collecting Battalion
  - 55th Collecting Company
  - 56th Collecting Company
  - 57th Collecting Company
