= Jonathan Woodson =

American government official

Jonathan Woodson FACS
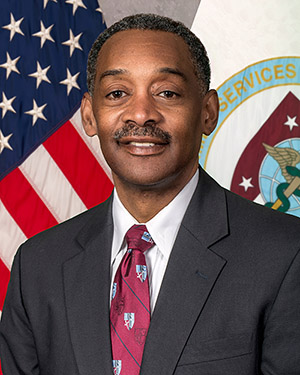
- Official portrait, 2022

7th President of the Uniformed Services University of the Health Sciences
- Incumbent
- Assumed office June 21, 2022
- Preceded by: Richard W. Thomas

United States Assistant Secretary of Defense for Health Affairs
- In office December 22, 2010 – May 1, 2016
- President: Barack Obama
- Secretary: Robert Gates; Leon Panetta; Chuck Hagel; Ash Carter
- Preceded by: S. Ward Casscells
- Succeeded by: Thomas P. McCaffery

Personal details
- Born: New York City, U.S.
- Education: City College (BS); New York University (MD); Army War College (MSS)

Military service
- Branch/service: United States Army; Army Reserve
- Years of service: 1986–2022
- Rank: Major general
- Unit: Medical Corps
- Commands: Army Reserve Medical Command
- Battles/wars: Gulf War; War in Afghanistan; Iraq War
- Awards: Legion of Merit; Bronze Star Medal; Meritorious Serv. Medal (2)

Jonathan A. Woodson is an American physician, government official, and retired United States Army officer.

He has served as president of the Uniformed Services University of the Health Sciences since 2022.

Woodson retired at the rank of Major General in the United States Army Reserves. He is board-certified in internal medicine, general surgery, vascular surgery, and critical care surgery.

== Early life and education ==
Woodson graduated from the City College of New York and the New York University School of Medicine. He did his postgraduate work at Massachusetts General Hospital and Harvard Medical School. Woodson also holds a Master’s degree in Strategic Studies from the U.S. Army War College.

== Career ==
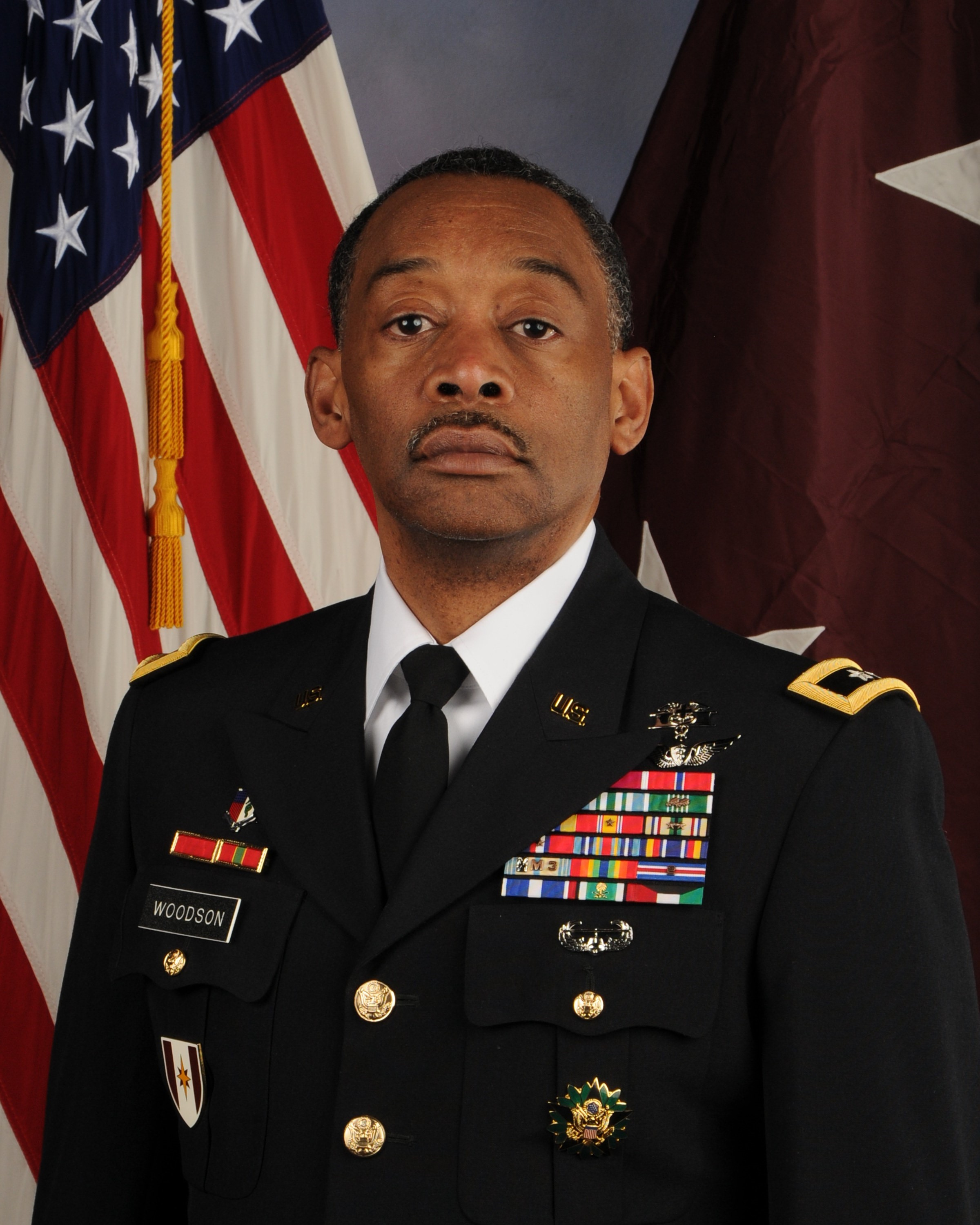
Major General Woodson in 2019

Woodson joined the military in 1986 and served for 36 years. He was a Senior Medical Officer with the National Disaster Management System and responded to the attacks on September 11. His military career included deployments during Operation Desert Storm, Kosovo, Operation Enduring Freedom and Operation Iraqi Freedom. He served as Assistant Surgeon General for Reserve Affairs, Force Structure and Mobilization in the Office of the Surgeon General, and as Deputy Commander of the Army Reserve Medical Command.

Woodson was appointed by President Obama and served as the Assistant Secretary of Defense for Health Affairs from 2010-2016.

He retired from the military in 2022 as a Major General in the US Army Reserves and Commander of the US Army Reserve Medical Command of Pinellas Park, Florida.

== Awards and recognition ==
During his time in the service, Woodson received the Legion of Merit, the Bronze Star Medal, and the Meritorious Service Medal. In 2009, he was awarded the Gold Humanism in Medicine Award from the Association of American Medical Colleges. Woodson was awarded the American College of Surgeons (ACS) Lifetime Military Award in December 2023.

Political offices
Preceded by George P. Taylor; Acting	United States Assistant Secretary of Defense for Health Affairs; 2010–2016	Succeeded by Karen S. Guice; Acting
Military offices
Preceded by Mary E. Link	Commanding General of the United States Army Reserve Medical Command; 2019–2022	Succeeded by W. Scott Lynn
Educational offices
Preceded by Richard W. Thomas	President of the Uniformed Services University of the Health Sciences; 2022–present	Incumbent
