= Fort Gillem =

Former US Army base near Atlanta, GA, US

- Forest Park, Georgia
- First Army shoulder sleeve insignia

Site information
- Type: Army post
- Controlled by: U.S. Army

Location
- Coordinates: 33.6202°N 84.3289°W

Site history
- Built: 1941
- In use: 1941-2011 (1997-present as MEPS facility)

Garrison information
- Garrison: First Army
- Occupants: United States Military Entrance Processing Command

Fort Gillem was a United States Army Post located in Forest Park, Georgia, on the southeast edge of Atlanta in Clayton County. Founded in 1941, it was a satellite installation of nearby Fort McPherson. The base housed different supply and support units, including the U.S. Army Criminal Investigation Laboratory and the 3rd MP Group (CID), both units of the United States Army Criminal Investigation Command. It employed 456 active duty personnel, 1,663 Army reservist, and 1,667 civilians. In 1973, its 1,465 acres (5.93 km^{2}) were annexed by Forest Park. The fort was named in the memory of Lieutenant General Alvan Cullom Gillem, Jr.

== History ==
The US Army established Fort Gillem in 1941 with the simultaneous construction of the Atlanta Quartermaster Depot and the Atlanta Ordnance Depot, which were mostly completed by December 1942. The two installations operated separately until April 1, 1948, when consolidated physically and operationally as the 'Atlanta Army Depot', a subcommand of the Army Materiel Command. The Atlanta Army Depot was deactivated on June 28, 1974. Locals referred to Fort Gillem as 'Conley Army Depot'.

=== Atlanta Ordnance Depot ===
Camp Conley, near Atlanta and Conley, Georgia, was home to the US Army "Atlanta Ordnance Depot".

While Camp Conley was not one of the new World War II camps, it had been used by the Army for many years as an ordnance depot. When the United States declared war, it mushroomed into a training camp for Ordnance Troops with numerous barracks and buildings being built. In spite of this increase in barracks space, there was insufficient room for new recruits and some training units were housed in a section of the camp known as "Tent City".

The slogan at Conley was "To Survive, you must know. To know, you must train. Training never ceases".

==== US Army Units activated or assigned ====
Company	Battalion	Activation/Assignment Date	Departure Date
3001st Ordnance Base Depot	139th Ordnance Base Automotive Maintenance	March 15, 1943	August 30, 1943

== Environmental contamination ==
Buried landfills have contaminated ground water under neighborhoods north and south of Gillem, and inspectors sampled indoor air early summer 2014 for vapor intrusion. As of September 2014, 40 homes had been tested and 26 homes were found to have elevated levels of benzene and trichlorethylene. The chemicals, which entered the homes through groundwater, are those commonly used to strip metal" per the Georgia Environmental Protection Division. The Army plans to install air ventilation systems in these homes to "eliminate or greatly reduce any risk". If higher levels are found in any other homes, larger mitigation efforts will be undertaken during which residents would relocate.

== Base closure and redevelopment ==
On May 13, 2005, the Base Realignment and Closure commission recommended that Fort Gillem, along with Fort McPherson and the Navy Supply Corps School be closed. An exit ceremony was held at Fort Gillem on June 3, 2011, and First Army troops stationed there were transferred to the Rock Island Arsenal in Rock Island, Illinois.

In 2012, after five years of negotiations with the Army, the City of Forest Park purchased 1,170 acres comprising most of the former Fort Gillem for $30 million, and ownership was transferred to the Forest Park/Fort Gillem Implementation Local Redevelopment Authority (ILRA). City officials wanted mixed-use development on the property, but following the housing crash turned their focus to industrial, manufacturing, warehouse and business park development. The only private residences are a 125-unit development owned by The Park, which has a lease with the Army set to expire in 2025. There are around 165 acres of contaminated groundwater on the site the cleanup of which the Army is responsible for. The clean up of the land was expected to take ten years.

The United States Army Criminal Investigation Division Criminal Investigations Division Crime Lab, a forensic crime laboratory, remains open on a 250-acre enclave retained by the Army.

The Fort Gillem enclave also house the Military Entrance Processing Station (MEPS), also Reserve Component units of the United States Army such as the Southeastern Army Reserve Intelligence Support Center (SEARISC), the United States Army Reserve 3rd Medical Command Deployment Support, the 221st Military Intelligence Battalion of the Georgia National Guard and an ID Card office.

It was decided to list Fort Gillem on the National Priorities List (NPL) of superfunds. On June 3, the Director of Georgia Department of Natural Resources Environmental Protection Division, 2013, Judson Turner, requested from USEPA Region IV that the decision be postponed.

On May 2, 2014 officials from the city and the Department of Defense under exclusion of the public held a ceremony at Fort Gillem to commemorate the impending move. The city is partnering with developer Weeks Robinson Properties and hopes it will be booming again, when land re-enters the city and county’s tax digest and "companies such as Porsche North America [are] moving their headquarters to the Forest Park and Hapeville area".

== See also ==
- Morris Army Airfield
