= 213th Brigade =

213th Brigade may refer to:

- 213th Brigade (United Kingdom)
- 213th Brigade, Royal Field Artillery, United Kingdom
- 213th Medical Brigade, United States
