= 65th Medical Brigade =

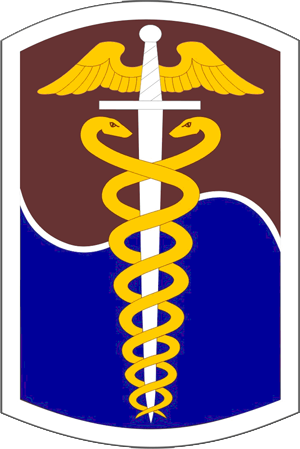
- Shoulder sleeve insignia
- Active: 1927 - present
- Country: United States
- Allegiance: United States Army
- Type: Medical brigade
- Size: Brigade
- Part of: Eighth United States Army
- Garrison/HQ: USAG Humphreys
- Nickname: Pacific Medics! Warrior Care!
- Motto: Da Dextram Misero (Give Aid to the Unfortunate)

Commanders
- Commander: COL Edgar G. Arroyo
- Command Sergeant Major: CSM Erin L Trudden

Insignia
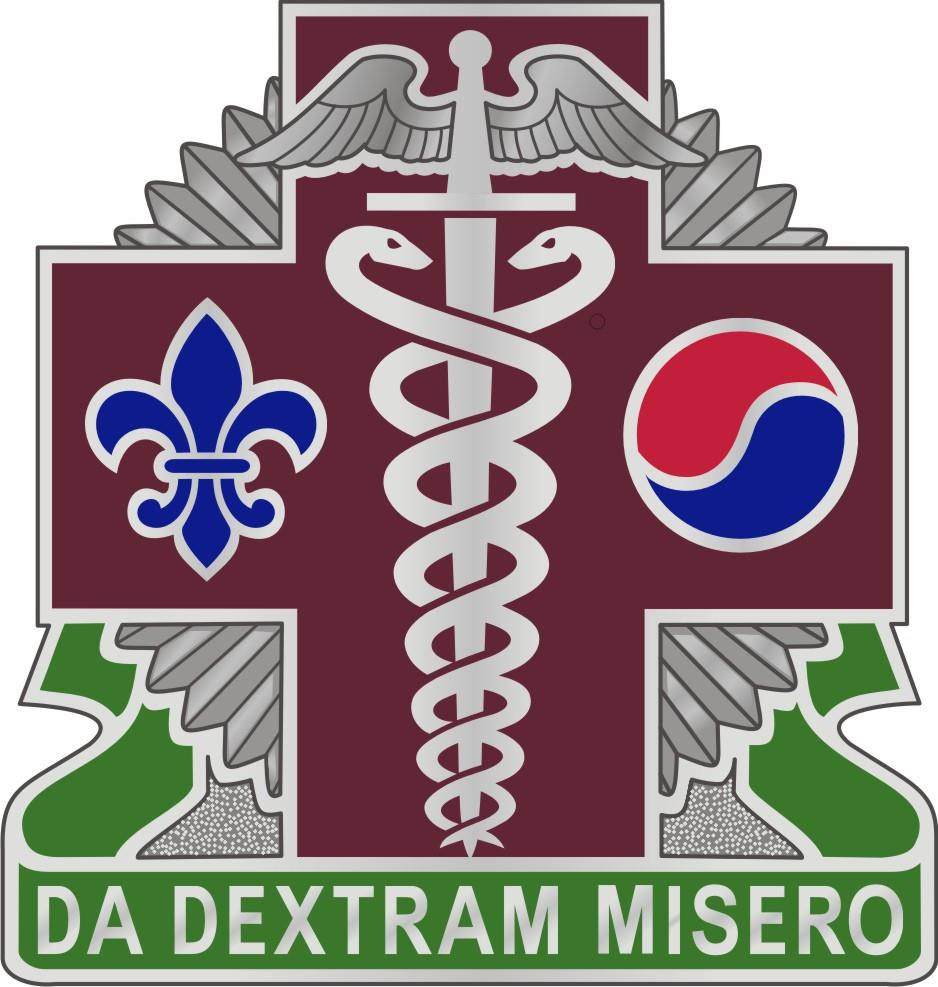
- Distinctive unit insignia

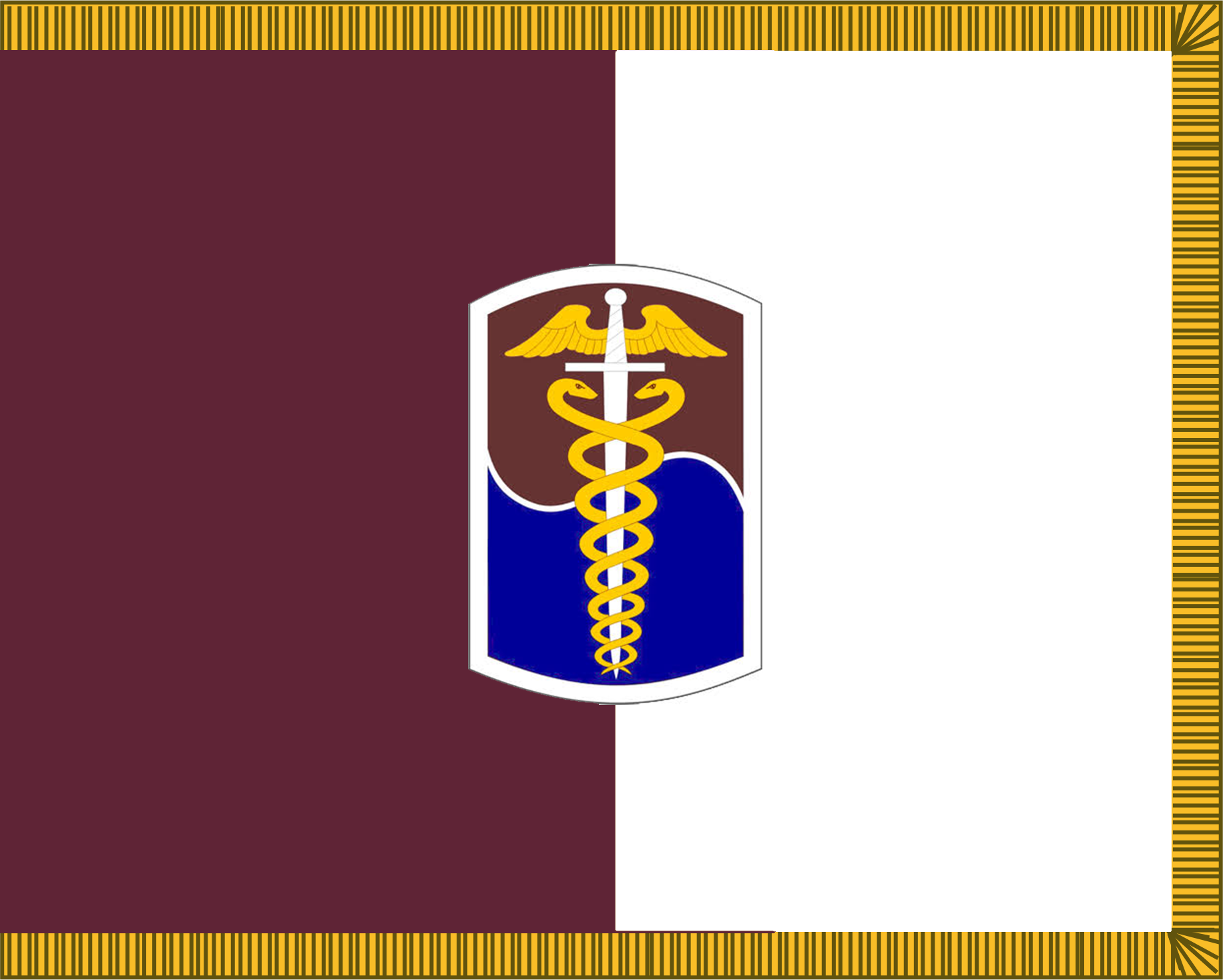
- 65th Medical Brigade Flag

The 65th Medical Brigade is a medical brigade of the United States Army subordinate to the Eighth United States Army and located at USAG Humphreys in South Korea.

== Lineage and honors ==
=== Lineage ===
- Constituted 18 October 1927 in the Regular Army as Headquarters, 15th Medical Regiment
- Formed 7 November 1927 with Organized Reserve Corps personnel with headquarters at Dayton, Ohio
- Subordinate elements constituted and assigned 26 March 1929
- Redesignated 28 May 1941 as the 65th Medical Regiment
- Activated 1 June 1941 at Fort Oglethorpe, Georgia, less Reserve personnel
- Reorganized and redesignated 10 March 1944 as Headquarters and Headquarters Detachment, 65th Medical Group (Subordinate elements hereafter separate lineages)
- Inactivated 16 August 1945 in Germany
- Activated 25 June 1958 in Korea
- Inactivated 21 June 1971 at Fort Lewis, Washington
- Redesignated 12 September 2007 as Headquarters and Headquarters Company, 65th Medical Brigade
- Activated 16 October 2008 in Korea

=== Honors ===
==== Campaign participation credit ====
- World War II
  - Normandy
  - Northern France
  - Rhineland
  - Ardennes-Alsace
  - Central Europe

=== Decorations ===
- Meritorious Unit Citation (Army), streamer embroidered EUROPE 1944-1945

== Insignia ==
=== Shoulder sleeve insignia ===
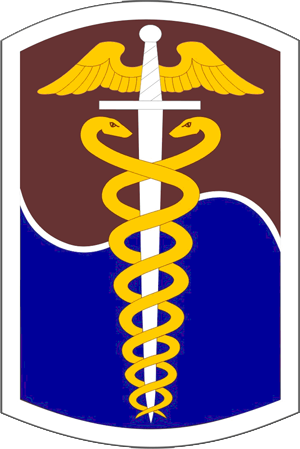
Shoulder Sleeve Insignia, 65th Medical Brigade

==== Description ====
On a rectangle arced at top and bottom with a 1/8 inch (.32 cm) white border, 2 inches (5.08 cm) in width and 3 inches (7.62 cm) in height overall divided per fess wavy in the manner of a Taeguk maroon and ultramarine blue by a white wavy barrulet, overall a white sword with golden yellow wings displayed issuing from the sword grip; intertwined around the sword blade seven times are two golden yellow serpents respectant.

==== Symbolism ====
Maroon, white, and the Caduceus historically are associated with the Army Medical Corps. Gold is emblematic of excellence and high ideals. The sword is pointing downward to indicate a military unit with a non-combatant posture. The serpents intertwine the sword blade seven times to represent the five campaign streamers awarded the unit during World War II, Normandy, Northern France, Rhineland, Ardennes-Alsace, and Central Europe, one Meritorious Unit streamer embroidered European Theater, and one for the units service in the Republic of Korea. The enduring alliance between the United States and the Republic of Korea is highlighted by the wavy division of the patch in the manner of the Taeguk, with maroon for red above and blue, below.

==== Background ====
The shoulder sleeve insignia was approved effective 16 October 2008. It was amended to correct the symbolism on 7 June 2016. (TIOH Dwg. No. A-1-973)

=== Distinctive unit insignia ===
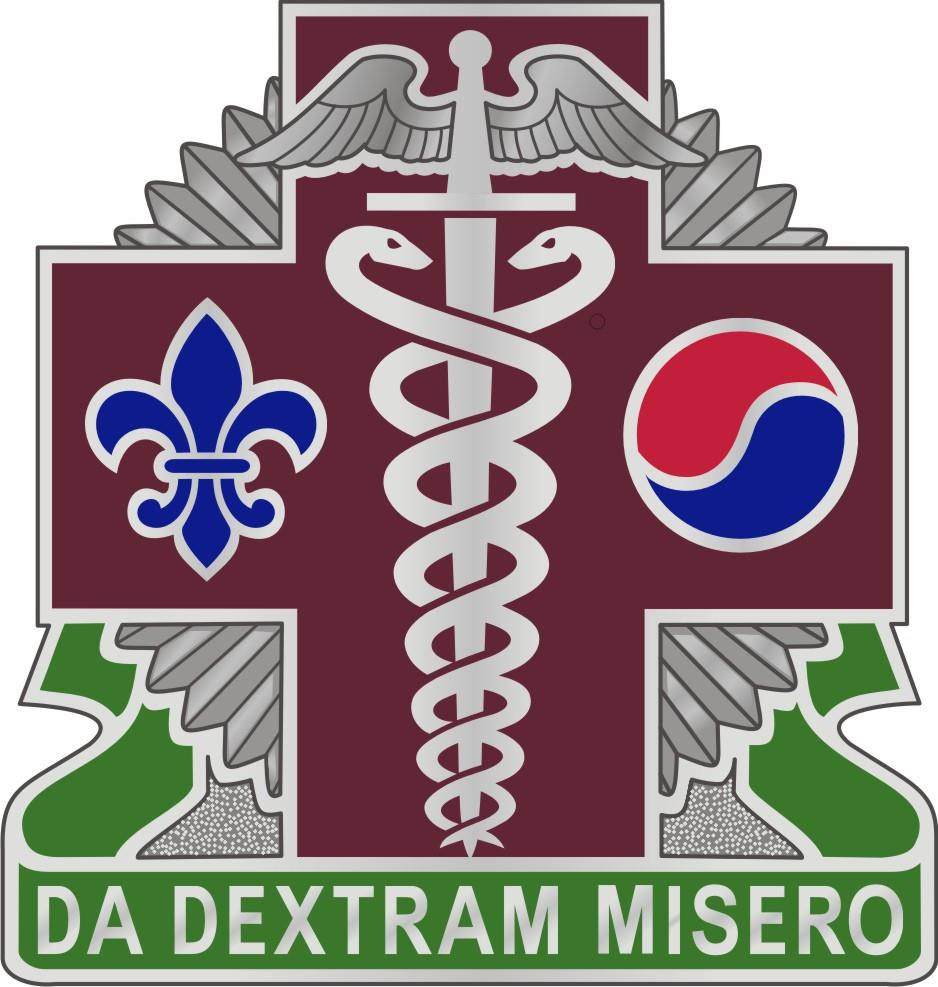
Distinctive Unit Insignia, 65th Medical Brigade

==== Description ====
A silver color metal and enamel device 1 3/16 inches (3.02 cm) in height overall consisting of a silver starburst supporting a maroon cross couped, thereon between a blue fleur-delis and Taeguk in proper colors, a silver sword point down with wings displayed and issuing from its grip, intertwined around the blade are two silver serpents respectant. Across the bottom and lower sides is a green scroll inscribed DA DEXTRAM MISERO in silver letters.

==== Symbolism ====
Maroon and silver are the colors for the U.S. Army Medical Corps. Green was the color used in the medieval age for academic gowns for medicine and it is currently the academic color for medicine. The cross, a traditional symbol for medical aid and assistance, symbolizes the basic mission of the Brigade. The serpents intertwined around the sword represent a caduceus. The caduceus, formally adopted by the Army Medical Department, is the symbol for U.S. Army medicine. The fleur-de-lis commemorates the units war campaign streamers earned for World War II in France and Europe. The Taeguk represents the strong and enduring alliance between the United States and the Republic of Korea, ensuring security, stability, and economic prosperity for over 50 years. The motto translates to Give Aid To The Unfortunate.

==== Background ====
The distinctive unit insignia was approved on 26 August 2009.

=== Distinctive unit insignia, 65th Medical Group ===
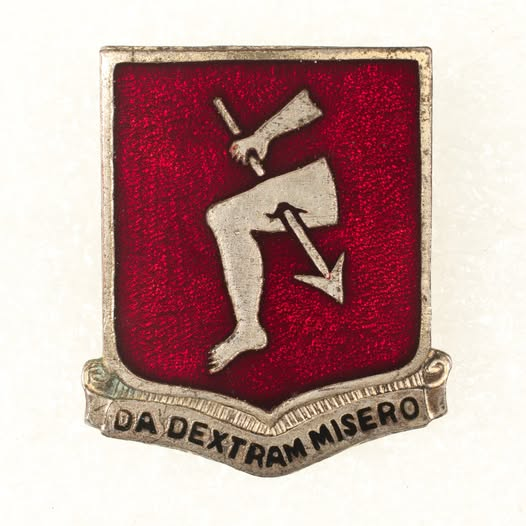
Distinctive Unit Insignia, 65th Medical Group

==== Description ====
On an overall 24 x 28mm device, a maroon shield a bent right leg, the thigh pierced by a spear grasped by a right hand, all silver. The motto DA DEXTRAM MISERO, is black on a silver scroll

==== Symbolism ====
Maroon and white (silver) are the traditional colors of the Army Medical Department. The hand withdrawing the spear represents aid to the wounded. The motto, DE DEXTRAM MISERO, translates as "Give Aid to the Unfortunate."

==== Background ====
Design originally approved 7 June 1934 for the 15th Medical Regiment. It was redesignated for the 65th Medical Regiment on XXX. It was redesignated for the 65th Medical Group on XXX. It was rescinded on XXX.

== History ==
=== The early years ===
The 65th Medical Brigade was originally constituted in the Regular Army as the 15th Medical Regiment on 18 October 1927, allotted to the Fifth Corps area, and assigned to the V Corps. The regiment was organized on 7 November 1927 with Organized Reserve Corps personnel as a Regular Army Inactive (RAI) unit with its headquarters at Dayton, Ohio. Its subordinate elements were constituted and assigned on 26 March 1929. The regiment conducted summer training most years at the Camp Knox station hospital, although it trained some years at Carlisle Barracks, Pennsylvania with the 1st Medical Regiment. The regiment's designated mobilization station was Fort Oglethorpe, Georgia.

The regiment was redesignated on 28 May 1941 as the 65th Medical Regiment, and was mobilized, less Reserve personnel, at Fort Oglethorpe, Georgia, and assigned to the IV Corps. On 24 September 1941 the regiment was assigned to the Third Army.

=== World War II ===
On March 10, 1944, the Regiment was broken up and the Headquarters and Service Company was redesignated the Headquarters and Headquarters Detachment, 65th Medical Group. The regiment's subordinate organic elements were redisagnated as separate numbered Medical Battalion Headquarters, Medical Collecting Companies, and Medical Clearing Companies. The Group served in Normandy, Northern France, Rhineland, Ardennes-Alsace, and Central Europe.

At the end of hostilities in Europe, the 65th Medical Group, like many of the medical groups in occupied territory, found itself supervising the operation of captured German civilian and military hospitals. With the group's strength of 2,300 Medical Department personnel, they supervised operation of 160 captured facilities with a peak patient population of 68,000.

=== Korean Service ===
The Group was reactivated for service in Korea from 1958 to 1971.

On 15 October 2008, the 18th Medical Command's colors were transferred to Hawai'i, and the personnel who had been assigned to the Headquarters, 18th Medical Command were used to form the Headquarters, 65th Medical Brigade. was redesignated as the 65th Medical Brigade. The headquarters was stationed at USAG Yongsan inside the Japanese Army Stockade until the end of 2017. It then moved to Camp Humphreys as part of the relocation of the Yongsan Garrison.

== Commanders ==
Image	Rank	Name	Branch	Begin date	End date	Notes
	1st Lieutenant	Robert A. Russell	MC, USAR	7 November 1927	28 January 1928	
	Major	Edwin R. Yost	MC, USAR	13 January 1928	12 October 1929	
	Lieutenant Colonel	Harvey N. Trumbull	MC	12 October 1929	January 1930	
		Unknown		January 1930	July 1932	
	Major	Edwin M. Kennedy	MC, USAR	July 1932	September 1932	
		Unknown		September 1932	June 1934	
	Colonel	Charles T. Hunt	MC, USAR	June 1934	June 1935	
		Unknown		June 1935	July 1936	
	Major	Raymond H. George	MC, USAR	July 1936	June 1937	
	Lieutenant Colonel	Hew B. McMurdo	MC, USA	June 1937	31 May 1939	
		Unknown		31 May 1939	28 May 1941	
		Unknown				
	Lieutenant Colonel	Carl G. Giesecke	MC			Commander during part of World War II. Left command to assume command of 112th Evacuation Hospital.
	Lieutenant Colonel	Donald E. Carle	MC		16 August 1945	Previously served as Division Surgeon, 65th Infantry Division. Assumed command "immediately following the war."
		Inactive		17 August 1945	24 June 1958	
	Colonel					
	Colonel	Nelson S. Irey	MC			Before 1965
	Colonel					
	Colonel	Valentine B. Sky	MC		21 June 1971	
		Inactive		22 June 1971	15 October 2008	
	Colonel	Jeffrey B. Clark	MC	16 October 2008	April 2010	Assumed command of the 65th Medical Brigade when the 18th MEDCOM moved to Hawaii. Retired as a Major General.
	Colonel	Rafael DeJesus	MS	April 2010	June 2012	
	Colonel	Kelly Murray	MC	June 2012	June 2014	
	Colonel	Dallas W. Homas	MC	June 2014	June 2016	
	Colonel	Wendy L. Harter	MS	June 2016	June 2018	Retired as a Brigadier General
	Colonel	Derek C. Cooper	MS	June 2018	June 2020	
	Colonel	Dave Zimmerman	MS	June 2020	June 2022	
	Colonel	Lee A. Burnett	MC	June 2022	June 2024	

== Organization ==
- 65th Medical Brigade, at Camp Humphreys
  - Headquarters and Headquarters Company, 65th Medical Brigade
  - 106th Medical Detachment (Veterinary Services)
  - 168th Medical Battalion (Multifunctional), at United States Army Garrison Daegu
  - 549th Hospital Center, at the Yongsan Garrison Brian D. Allgood Army Community Hospital
    - 121st Field Hospital
    - 502nd Field Hospital
  - 618th Medical Company (Dental, Area Support) / Dental Health Activity
