= Medical brigade =

Military brigade for medical support

In the United States Army, a medical brigade (MED BDE) is a unit providing command and control for assigned or attached medical units at Corps level. One Medical Brigade is typically assigned to one Army Corps to provide Role III Command and Control, and Medical Brigades are assigned as needed to the Medical Command (Deployment Support) as required to lessen the span of control at Role IV. A typical Headquarters and Headquarters Company (HHC) for a MED BDE consists of about 65 personnel.

== Operations ==
A Medical Brigade task organizes its medical assets on the battlefield. It plans Combat Service Support (CHS) operations and oversees logistical operations for the group's units. It serves as a radio control net for group units and performs medical regulation between group units. It also coordinates external support for group units.

== Components ==
- HHC (Internal Admin/Supply/Maintenance Support)
  - S-1 (Group Personnel Actions)
  - S-2/3 (Operations, Planning, NBC, Medical Regulating (MRO), Security, Intell, Training, TOC Operations)
  - S-4 (Property Accountability, Group Supply Operations, Medical Resupply, Transportation Support, Maintenance Tracking, ALOC Operations)
  - S-6 (Group Communications)
  - Chief Nurse (CN) (Nursing Education, Professional Services)
  - Chaplain (Unit Ministry Team Operations)
- Hospital Centers (HCs)
- Multifunctional Medical Battalions (MMBs) (Replaced Evacuation, Medical Logistics, and Area Medical Support Battalions)
- Medical Company Area Support (MCAS)
- Medical Logistics Company (MEDLOG CO)
- Forward Surgical Teams (FSTs)
- Combat Stress Control (COSC) Detachments
- Medical Company (Dental Services)
- Medical Company (Veterinary Support Services)
- Preventive Medicine Detachments
- Medical Specialty Teams (orthopedic, neurosurgery, ophthalmology, etc.)

== Active Medical Brigades of the U.S. Army ==
- 1st Medical Brigade (III Corps)
- 2nd Medical Brigade (Reserve; 807th Medical Command (Deployment Support) (807th MCDS))
- 5th Medical Brigade (Reserve; 3rd Medical Command (Deployment Support) (3rd MCDS))
- 8th Medical Brigade (Reserve; 3rd MCDS)
- 30th Medical Brigade (United States Army Europe)
- 32nd Medical Brigade (United States Army Medical Department Center and School) [TDA only--not a deployable headquarters]
- 44th Medical Brigade (XVIII Airborne Corps)
- 62nd Medical Brigade (I Corps)
- 65th Medical Brigade (Eighth Army)
- 139th Medical Brigade (Reserve; 807th MCDS)
- 176th Medical Brigade (Reserve; 807th MCDS)
- 307th Medical Brigade (Reserve; 807th MCDS)
- 330th Medical Brigade (Reserve; 807th MCDS)
- 332nd Medical Brigade (Reserve; 3rd MCDS)
- 338th Medical Brigade (Reserve; 3rd MCDS)
- 804th Medical Brigade (Reserve; 3rd MCDS)

== Former Medical Brigades of the U.S. Army ==
- 4th Medical Brigade (Reserve; United States Army Europe)
- 7th Medical Brigade (United States Army Europe)
- 18th Medical Brigade (Eighth Army) (Reorganized and redesignated 18th Medical Command)
- 112th Medical Brigade (Ohio Army National Guard) (Reorganized and redesignated 112th Medical Battalion)
- 175th Medical Brigade (California Army National Guard)
- 213th Medical Brigade (Missouri Army National Guard)
- 426th Medical Brigade (Reserve; 96th Army Reserve Command)
- 807th Medical Brigade (Reserve; III Corps) (Reorganized and redesignated 807th Medical Command)
- 818th Medical Brigade (Reserve; 7th Medical Command)

== See also ==
- Military medicine
- Category:Medical battalions of the United States Marine Corps
