= 4th Medical Brigade =

- Shoulder sleeve insignia
- Active: 1928-1929; 1943-1945; 1948-1950; 1988-1995
- Country: United States
- Allegiance: United States Army
- Type: Medical brigade
- Size: Brigade
- Part of: United States Army Reserve
- Garrison/HQ: Heidelberg, Germany
- Mottos: Forward and Ready
- Colors: Maroon and White

Insignia
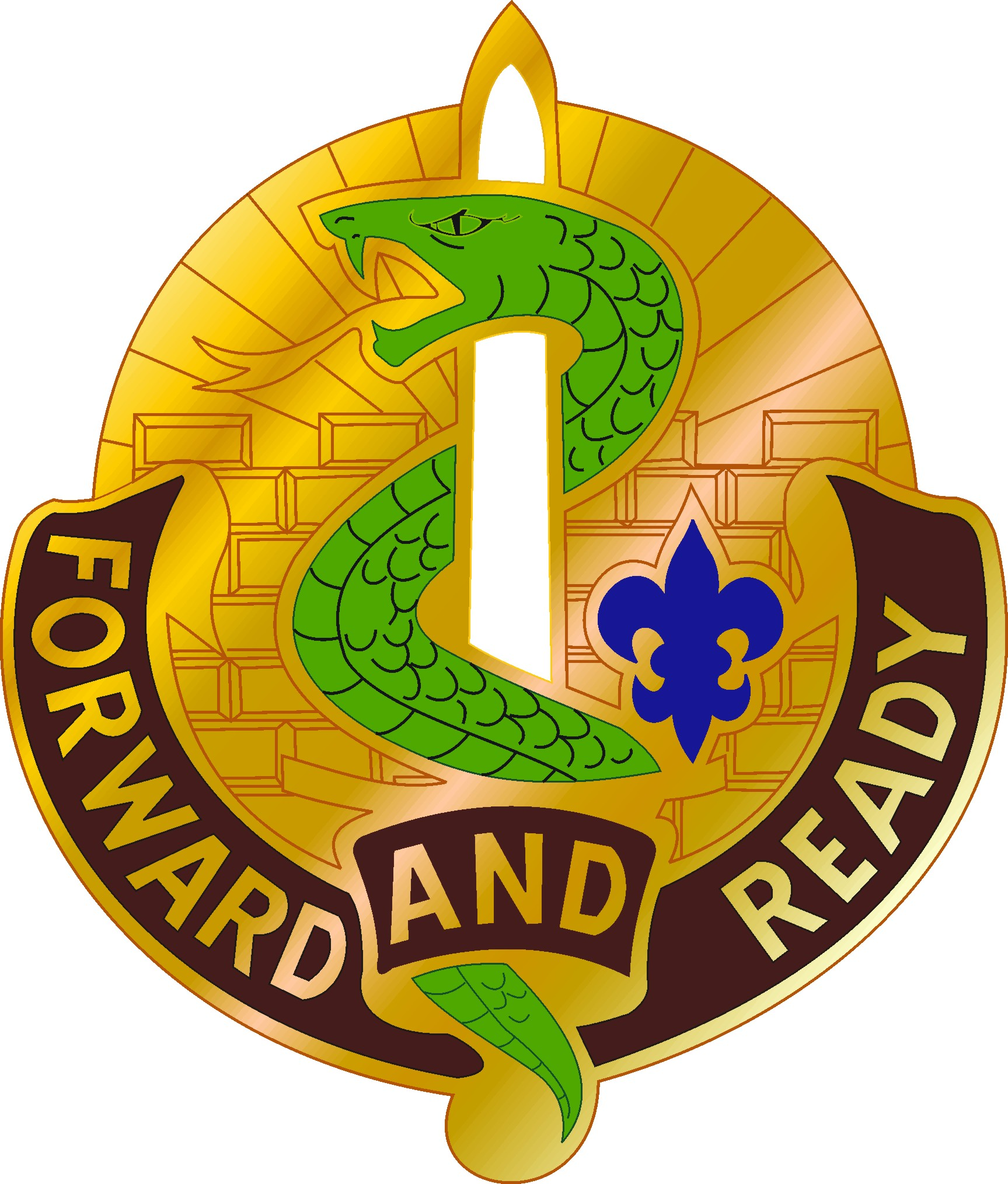
- Distinctive unit insignia

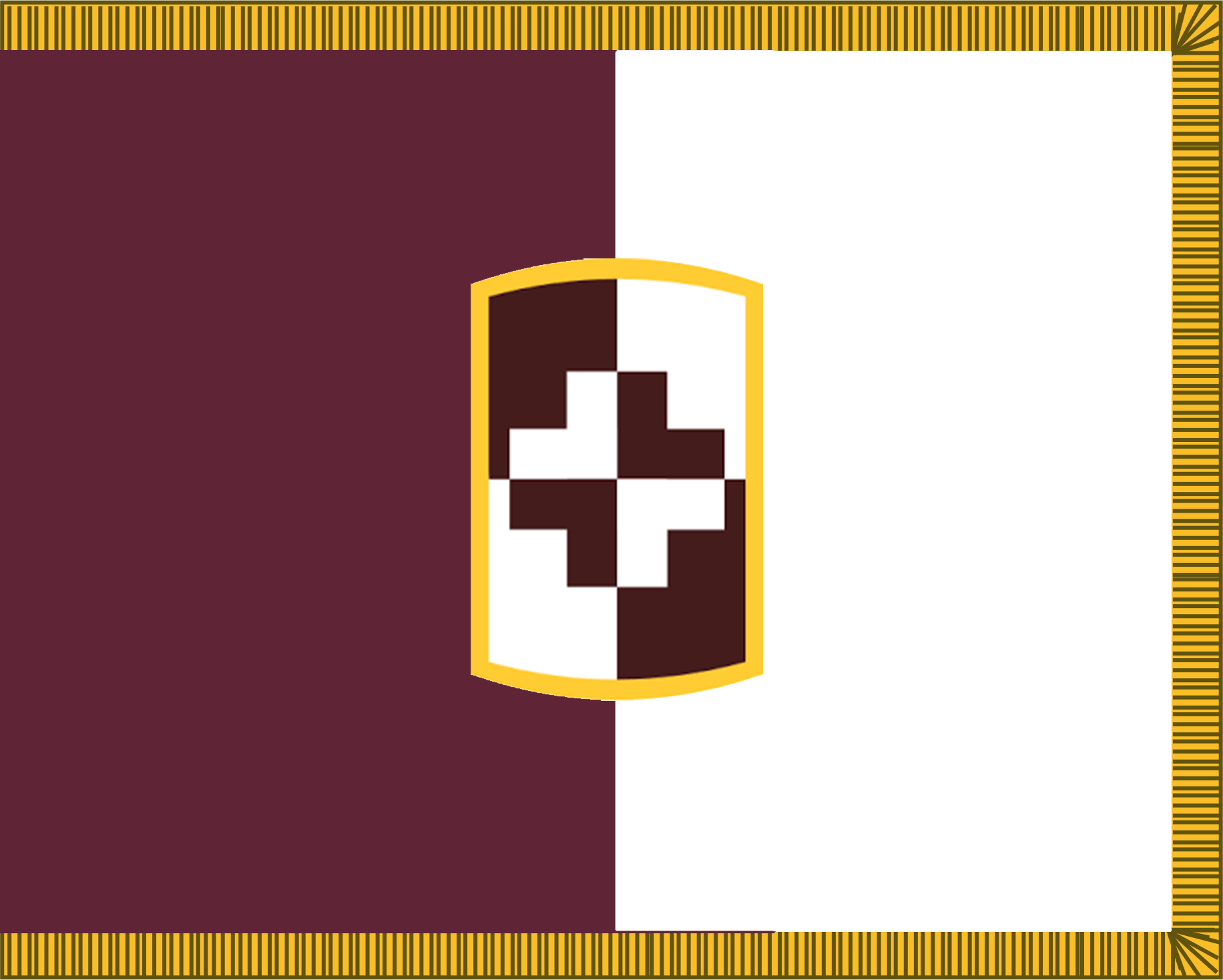
- 4th Medical Brigade Flag

The 4th Medical Brigade was a medical brigade of the United States Army Reserve subordinate to the Seventh United States Army and located in Germany.

== Lineage and Honors ==
=== Lineage ===
- Constituted 5 September 1928 in the Organized Reserves as the 4th Auxiliary Surgical Group
- Organized by December 1929 at Philadelphia, Pennsylvania
- Ordered into active military service 21 January 1943 and reorganized at Atlanta, Georgia
- Reorganized and redesignated 25 July 1945 as the 897th Medical Professional Services
- Inactivated 28 September 1945 in Germany
- (Organized Reserves redesignated 25 March 1948 as the Organized Reserve Corps; on 9 July 1952 as the Army Reserve)
- Redesignated 3 December 1948 as Headquarters, 897th Medical Professional Services, and assigned to the Third Army
- Activated 19 October 1948 at Macon, Georgia
- Location changed 20 April 1949 to Augusta, Georgia; on 1 February 1950 to Rome, Georgia
- Inactivated 1 December 1950 at Rome, Georgia and relieved from assignment to the Third Army
- Redesignated 17 July 1988 as Headquarters and Headquarters Company, 4th Medical Brigade, assigned to the United States Army Europe, and Seventh Army and activated in Germany
- Inactivated XXX 1995 in Germany

=== Honors ===
==== Campaign Participation Credit ====
- World War II
  - Normandy
  - Northern France
  - Rhineland
  - Ardennes-Alsace
  - Central Europe

=== Decorations ===
- Meritorious Unit Citation (Army), Streamer embroidered EUROPEAN THEATER

== Insignia ==
=== Shoulder Sleeve Insignia ===
Shoulder Sleeve Insignia, 4th Medical Brigade

==== Description ====
On a rectangle divided per cross maroon and white and arced at top and bottom with a 1/8 inch (.32 cm) yellow border, 3 inches (7.62 cm) in height and 2 inches (5.08 cm) in width overall, a cross divided per cross counterchanged.

==== Symbolism ====
Maroon and white are the colors associated with the Medical Corps. Yellow/gold expresses honor and high achievement. The division of the insignia into four parts underscores "4," the numerical designation of the organization. The four divisions also allude to the main or cardinal directions on the compass and highlight the global scope of the unit's mission. The cross represents medical care. The counterchanged colors emphasize the integration of the Brigade medical mission with the Total Army.

==== Background ====
The shoulder sleeve insignia was approved on 20 December 1989. (TIOH Dwg. No. A-1-773)

=== Distinctive Unit Insignia ===
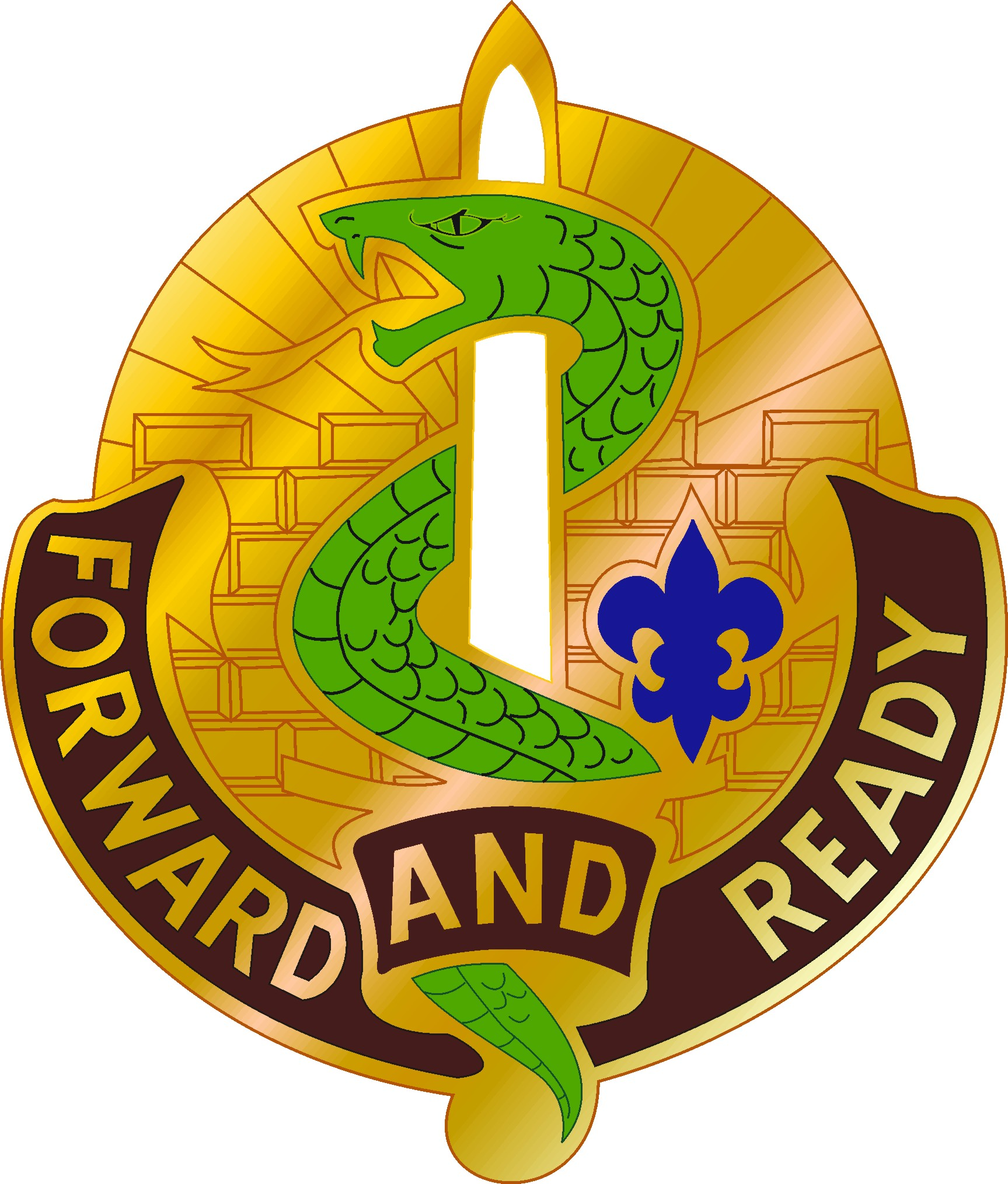
Distinctive Unit Insignia, 4th Medical Brigade

==== Description ====
A gold color metal and enamel device 1 1/8 inches (2.86 cm) in height overall consisting of a gold embattled castle wall in front of a stylized gold rayed demi-sun, overall a green serpent entwined around a sword with a white blade and gold hilt and at the serpent's right is a blue fleur-de-lis all enclosed around the bottom by a maroon and gold tripartite scroll of the sword hilt and inscribed "FORWARD" "AND" "READY" in gold letters.

==== Symbolism ====
Maroon and white are the colors traditionally associated with the Medical Corps. Gold is emblematic of high achievement. The gold sun and the color green express hope and regeneration. The serpent entwined around the sword recalls the rod of Aesculapius, the symbols of healing and medicine. The sword highlights the organization's military mission to support the medical needs of the soldier. The upright and aggressive position of the sword dramatizes the motto "FORWARD AND READY". The castle wall and fleur-de-lis commemorate the unit's World War II campaign participation credits in France and Central Europe.

==== Background ====
The distinctive unit insignia was approved on 20 December 1989.

== History ==
=== The Early Years ===
The 4th Auxiliary Surgical Group was originally constituted in the Organized Reserve Corps on 5 September 1928, assigned to the General Reserve, and allotted to the Third Corps Area. The unit was initiated by July 1929 at Philadelphia, Pennsylvania and inactivated on 16 August 1929 by reassignment of all assigned personnel.

== Commanders ==
Image	Rank	Name	Branch	Begin date	End date	Notes
	Lieutenant Colonel	Matthew L. Carr	MC	July 1929	7 August 1929	
		Inactive		8 August 1929	20 January 1943	
	Colonel					
	Colonel					
	Colonel					
		Inactive		29 September 1945	18 October 1949	
	Colonel					
	Colonel					
	Colonel					
		Inactive		2 December 1950	15 July 1988	
	Colonel					
	Colonel	Robert Burnett	MC			
	Colonel					
