= 175th Medical Brigade =

- Shoulder sleeve insignia
- Active: 1964 - 1992
- Country: United States
- Allegiance: United States Army
- Type: Medical brigade
- Size: Brigade
- Part of: California Army National Guard
- Garrison/HQ: Sacramento, California
- Motto: Command - Guidance - Control
- Colors: Maroon and White

Insignia
- Distinctive unit insignia

The 175th Medical Brigade was a medical brigade of the California Army National Guard headquartered at Sacramento, California.

== Lineage and honors ==
=== Lineage ===
- Organized and Federally recognized 1 April 1964 in the California Army National Guard at Sacramento as Headquarters and Headquarters Detachment, 175th Medical Battalion
- Reorganized and redesignated 29 January 1968 as Headquarters and Headquarters Detachment, 175th Medical Group
- Reorganized and redesignated 1 January 1976 as Headquarters and Headquarters Detachment, 175th Medical Brigade
- Reorganized and redesignated 1 April 1977 as Headquarters and Headquarters Company, 175th Medical Brigade
- Inactivated 1997 at Sacramento, California

=== Honors ===
==== Campaign Participation Credit ====
- None

=== Decorations ===
- None

== Insignia ==
=== Shoulder Sleeve Insignia ===
Shoulder Sleeve Insignia, 175th Medical Brigade

==== Description ====
On a maroon square 2 1/4 inches (5.72 cm) on each side overall, one angle up, a yellow stylized sunburst bearing a scarlet Greek cross charged with a narrow white Greek cross, all within a 1/8 inch (.32 cm) white border.

==== Symbolism ====
he Greek cross is a symbol of aid and assistance. The stylized sunburst represents the present location of the organization at Sacramento, California, referred to as the "Golden City" and the "Golden State." The sun rays are symbolic of healing and good health. White is a color used to represent ability and wisdom. The color scarlet symbolizes courage and dedication, while maroon and white are colors used for the Army Medical Department.

==== Background ====
The shoulder sleeve insignia was approved on 4 June 1976. (TIOH Dwg. No. A-1-592)

=== Distinctive Unit Insignia ===
Distinctive Unit Insignia, 175th Medical Brigade

==== Description ====
A gold color metal and enamel device 1 1/8 inches (2.86 cm) in height overall consisting of a maroon Greek cross charged with a white disc bearing a gold star, all above a gold grizzly bear standing on four feet in base in front of a light green field and a gold setting sun, the top rays of the sun terminating in back of the cross; all enclosed by a triple-arched maroon scroll inscribed "COMMAND" on the left side and base, "GUIDANCE" on the top, and "CONTROL" on the right side and base, all letters gold.

==== Symbolism ====
Maroon and white are the colors used for the Army Medical Department. The grizzly bear and setting sun are suggested by the crest for the California Army National Guard. The gold star refers to the unit's location at Sacramento, the capital of California. Additionally, the sun and star, symbols of command, guidance, and control, allude to the organization's motto. The cross, an emblem of aid and assistance, signifies the medical mission of the unit.

==== Background ====
The distinctive unit insignia was originally approved for the 175th Medical Group on 1 February 1972. It was redesignated for the 175th Medical Brigade on 4 March 1976.

== Commanders ==
Image	Rank	Name	Branch	Begin date	End date	Notes
	Colonel	Neville I. Throckmorton	MC	1 April 1964	January 1972	Also continued serving as State Surgeon. Promoted to Lieutenant Colonel as part of the activation ceremony for the battalion; promoted to Colonel in January 1969. After group command, transferred to the Army Reserve and became executive officer of the 6253rd U.S. Army Hospital, a General Officer command.
	Lieutenant Colonel	Calvin Samples	MS	January 1972	April 1972	
	Colonel	Ernest N. Mobley	MS	April 1972	1973	175th Medical Group. Mobley was a State Assemblyman, and had received a Silver Star, two Bronze Star Medals and the Combat Infantryman Badge in World War II.
	Brigadier General	James Q. Simmons	MC	1973	22 November 1986	Group commander until conversion to the 175th Medical Brigade; first Medical Corps General Officer in the California National Guard.
	Brigadier General	Douglas D. Bradley	MC	22 January 1982	22 November 1986	Retired out of command
	Brigadier General	Stephen M. Wyman	MC	22 November 1986	4 August 1991	
	Brigadier General	Gary R. Truex	MC	4 August 1991	1997	Cased the Brigade colors

== Organization ==
=== 1964 ===
- HHD, 175th Medical Battalion, Sacramento
- No subordinate units attached, planning headquarters only

=== 1967 ===
- HHD, 175th Medical Battalion, Sacramento
- 59th Army Band, Sacramento
- 246th Medical Detachment, Sacramento

=== 1972 ===
- HHD, 175th Medical Group
- 143rd Evacuation Hospital
- 146th Evacuation Hospital
- 270th MP Company
- MP unit
- 59th Army Band

=== 1990 ===
- HHC, 145th Medical Brigade, Sacramento
- 143rd Evacuation Hospital, Los Alamitos
- 146th Combat Support Hospital, San Francisco
- 980th Medical Supply, Optical, and Maintenance (MEDSOM) Unit, Sacramento
- 126th Medical Company (Air Ambulance), Sacramento
- 246th Medical Detachment, Sacramento
