= 8th Medical Brigade =

- Shoulder sleeve insignia
- Active: 1976-Present
- Country: United States
- Branch: United States Army Reserve
- Type: Medical brigade
- Size: Brigade
- Part of: 3rd Medical Command
- Garrison/HQ: Fort Wadsworth, New York
- Motto: Strength through health
- Colors: Maroon and White

Insignia
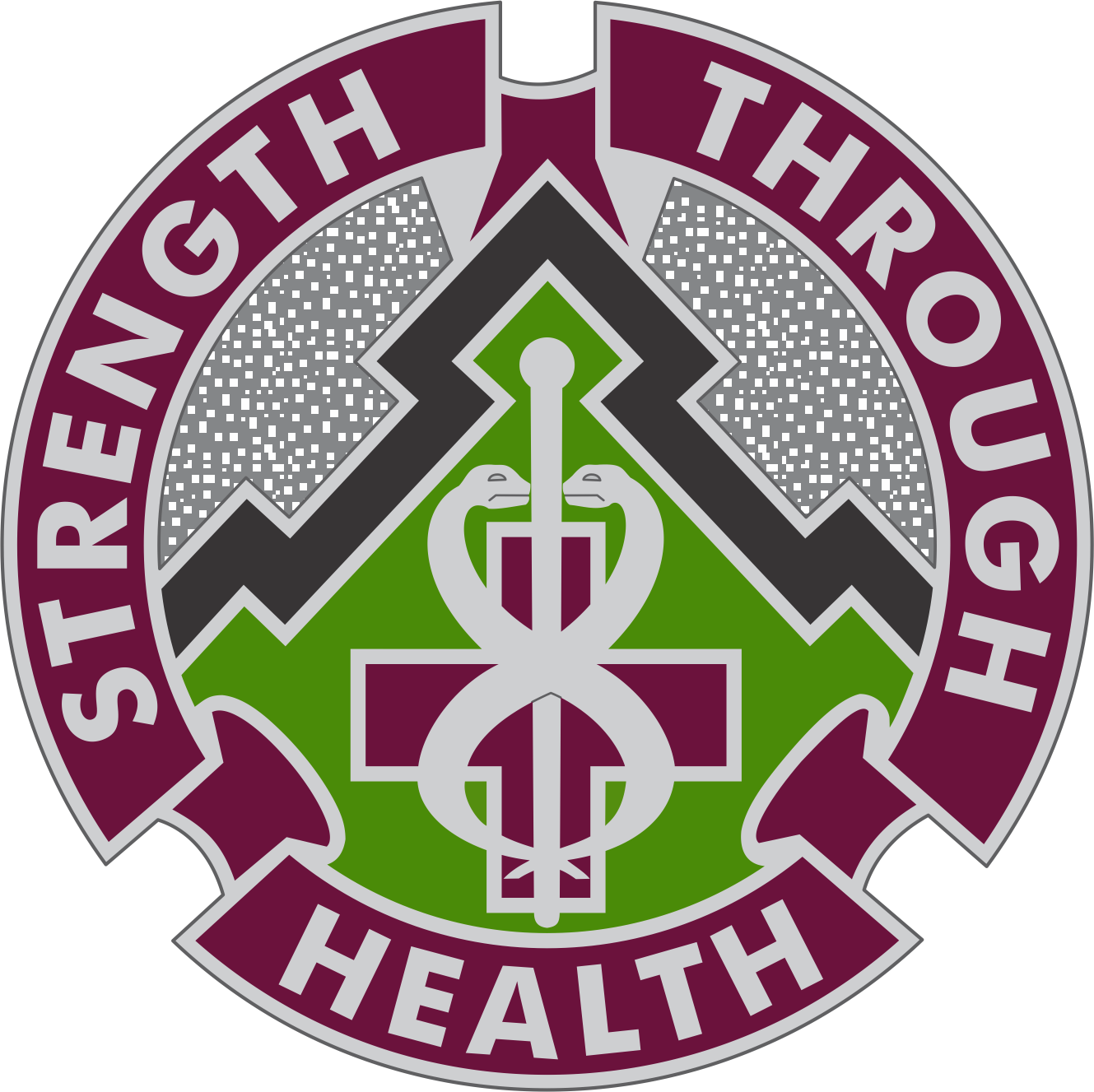
- Distinctive unit insignia

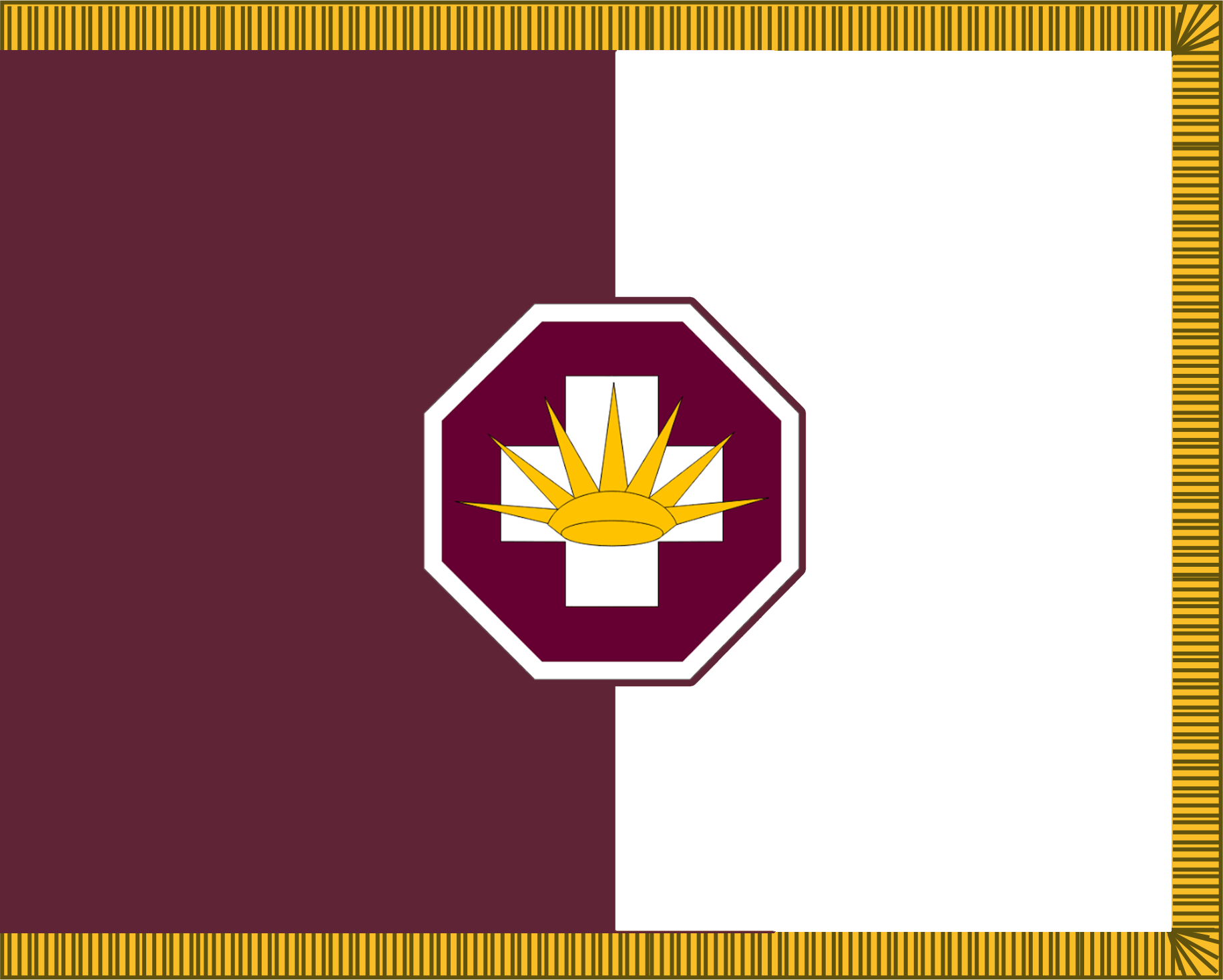
- 8th Medical Brigade Flag

The 8th Medical Brigade is a medical brigade of the United States Army Reserve subordinate to the 3rd Medical Command) and headquartered at Fort Wadsworth, New York.

== Current organization ==
The 8th Medical Brigade is a subordinate unit of the 3rd Theater Medical Command. As of January 2026 the brigade consists of the following units:

- 8th Medical Brigade, at Fort Wadsworth (NY)
  - Headquarters and Headquarters Company, 8th Medical Brigade, at Fort Wadsworth (NY)
  - 439th Medical Battalion (Multifunctional), at Joint Base McGuire–Dix–Lakehurst (NJ)
    - Headquarters and Headquarters Detachment, at Joint Base McGuire–Dix–Lakehurst (NJ)
    - 147th Medical Detachment (Veterinary Services), at Joint Base McGuire–Dix–Lakehurst (NJ)
    - 315th Medical Detachment Team (Optometry), at Joint Base McGuire–Dix–Lakehurst (NJ)
    - 327th Medical Detachment (Combat and Operational Stress Control — COSC), at Joint Base McGuire–Dix–Lakehurst (NJ)
    - 328th Medical Detachment (Combat and Operational Stress Control — COSC), in Coraopolis (PA)
    - 329th Medical Company (Ground Ambulance), in Fairview (PA)
    - 365th Medical Detachment Team (Optometry), in Coraopolis (PA)
    - 393rd Medical Company (Logistics), in Coraopolis (PA)
  - 818th Hospital Center, in Utica (NY)
    - Headquarters and Headquarters Detachment, in Utica (NY)
    - 865th Field Hospital (32 Bed), in Utica (NY)
      - Headquarters and Headquarters Detachment, in Utica (NY)
      - 258th Medical Detachment (Hospital Augmentation, Intermediate Care Ward 60 Bed), in Schenectady (NY)
      - 322nd Medical Detachment (Hospital Augmentation, Medical 32 Bed), in Utica (NY)
    - 912th Field Hospital (32 Bed), in Niagara Falls (NY)
      - Headquarters and Headquarters Detachment, in Niagara Falls (NY)
      - 301st Medical Detachment (Hospital Augmentation, Surgical 24 Bed), in Ashley (PA)
      - 423rd Medical Detachment (Hospital Augmentation, Medical 32 Bed), in Niagara Falls (NY)
    - 1st Medical Detachment Team (Forward Resuscitative and Surgical), at Fort Hamilton (NY)
    - 691st Medical Detachment Team (Forward Resuscitative and Surgical), in Utica (NY)
    - 1982nd Medical Detachment Team (Forward Resuscitative and Surgical), in Niagara Falls (NY)

== Lineage and Honors ==
=== Lineage ===
- Constituted 16 July 1976 as Headquarters and Headquarters Company, 8th Medical Brigade and activated at Fort Hamilton, Brooklyn, New York.

=== Honors ===
==== Campaign Participation Credit ====
- None

=== Decorations ===
- None

== Insignia ==
=== Shoulder Sleeve Insignia ===
Shoulder Sleeve Insignia, 6th Medical Brigade

==== Description ====
On a maroon octagon 2 1/2 inches (6.35 cm) in height overall bearing a white Greek cross surmounted by a yellow crown of seven points, (six points extending beyond the cross) all within a 1/8 inch (.32 cm) white border.

==== Symbolism ====
The Greek cross, a symbol of aid and assistance is used to represent the 8th Medical Brigade. The crown alluding to New York referred to as the "Empire State" was suggested by the Statue of Liberty in New York harbor. In numerology the number eight symbolizes regeneration and achievement. The octagon shape furthermore alludes to the numerical designation of the 8th Medical Brigade. Maroon and white are colors used for the Army Medical Department.

==== Background ====
The shoulder sleeve insignia was approved on 16 July 1976. (TIOH Dwg. No. A-1-594)

=== Distinctive Unit Insignia ===
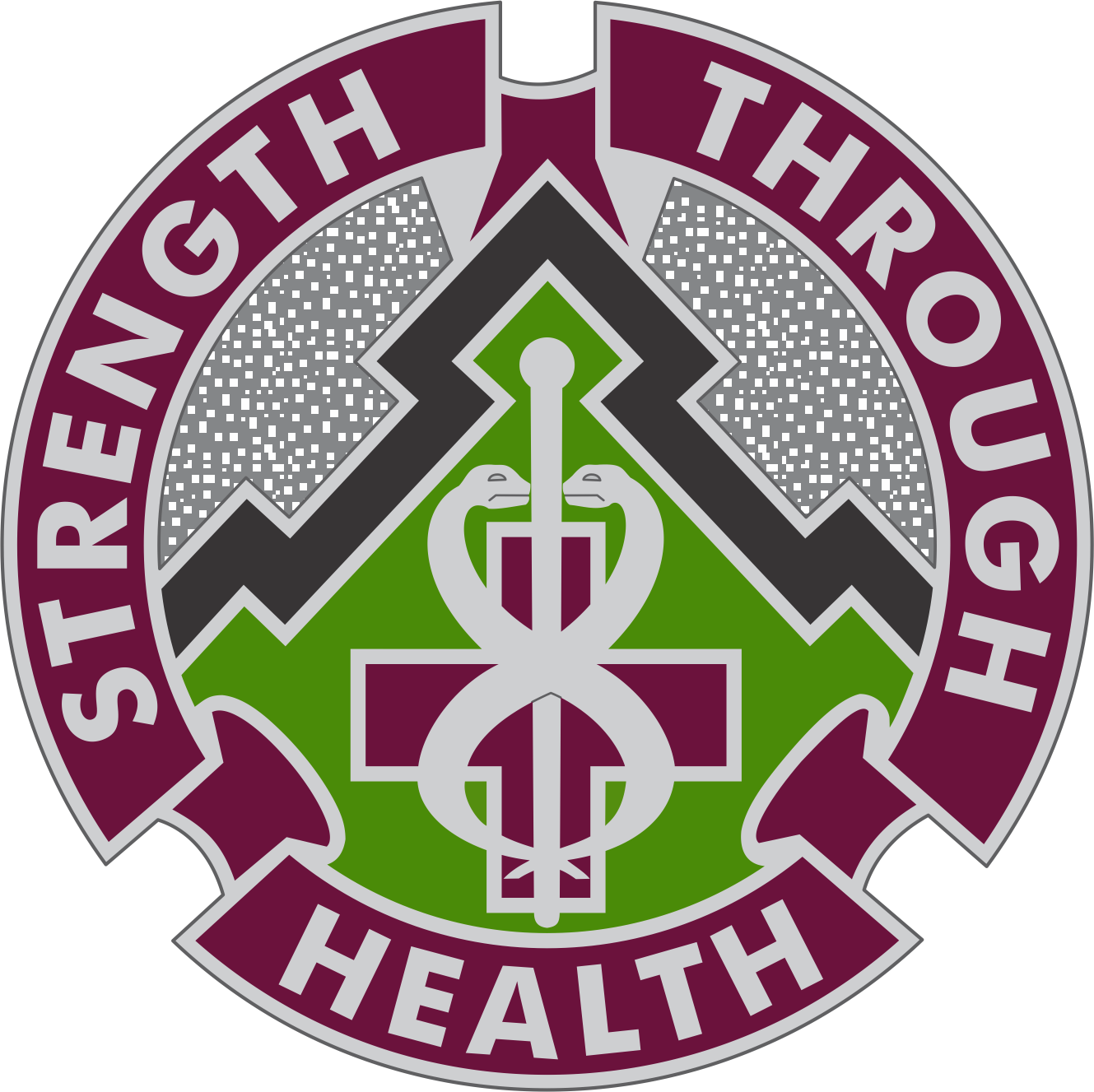
Distinctive Unit Insignia, 4th Medical Brigade

==== Description ====
A silver color metal and enamel device 1 1/8 inches (2.86 cm) in height overall consisting chevronwise of a black embattled partition line above a silver metal wingless caduceus surmounting a maroon Greek cross on a green background and all encircled by a continuous maroon scroll, divided in three folds and inscribed "STRENGTH THROUGH HEALTH" in silver letters.

==== Symbolism ====
Maroon and white are the colors used for the Army Medical Department. The cross, a symbol for aid and assistance, symbolizes the basic mission of the Brigade. The caduceus and the color green, a reference to the color of the ancient gowns of medicine, represents the high ideals and traditions of the healing arts. The entwined serpents also simulate the number "8" referring to the organization's numerical designation. The embattled partition line, representing a segment of early coastal fortification, alludes to the early history of Fort Hamilton, the present home area and location of the 8th Medical Brigade.

==== Background ====
The distinctive unit insignia was approved on 13 September 1976.

=== Combat Service Identification Badge ===
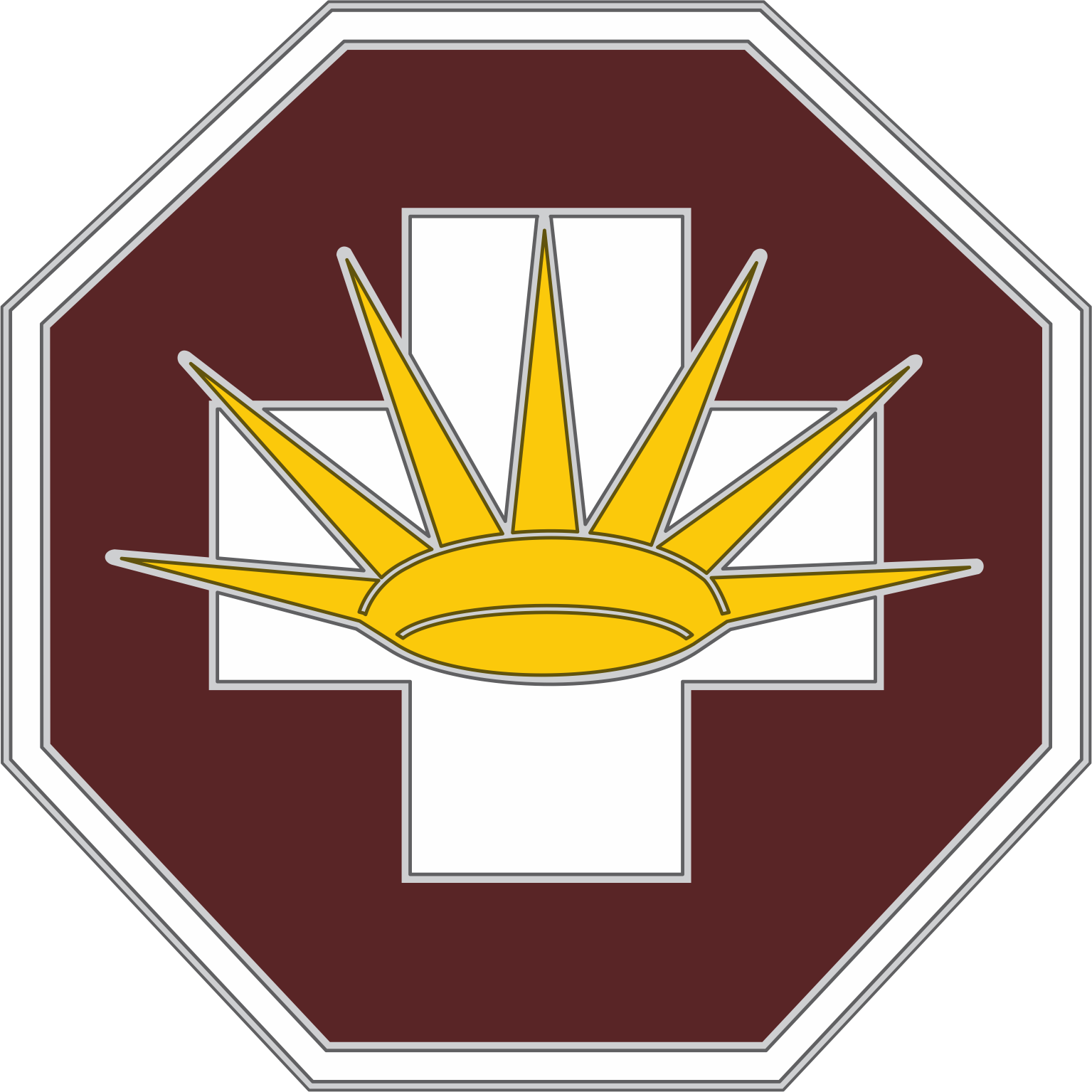
Combat Service Identification Badge, 4th Medical Brigade

==== Description/Blazon ====
A silver color metal and enamel device 2 inches (5.08 cm) in height consisting of a design similar to the shoulder sleeve insignia.

== History ==
Upon its establishment in 1976, and for many years afterwards, the 8th Medical Brigade was reputed to be the largest medical brigade in the Army, active or reserve.

The 8th Medical Brigade replaced the 818th Hospital Center, which had served as the major medical command and control headquarters in the northeast, when it relocated to Fort Gillem, Georgia, with an effective date of 15 July 1976. Many members of the brigade's initial staff had been members of 818th before it relocated, and its first commander had once served as the deputy hospital canter commander.

In 2004-2005, the 8th Medical Brigade headquarters sent a detachment to provide command and control over medical units providing support in Kuwait.

== Commanders ==
Image	Rank	Name	Branch	Begin date	End date	Notes
	Brigadier General	Joseph P. Cillo	MC	26 July 1976	26 July 1980	
	Brigadier General	Gregorio Brevetti	MC	26 July 1980	14 July 1984	
	Brigadier General	Paul Skok	MC	14 July 1984	5 April 1985	Died in Command
	Brigadier General	Thomas E. Potter	MC	5 April 1985	April 1989	Assumed command upon Skok's death
	Brigadier General	Francis R. Jordan, Jr.	MC	April 1989	April 1993	Retired as a Major General
	Brigadier General	Melvin R Johnson	MC	April 1993	May 1997	Retired as a Major General
	Brigadier General	Duane L. May	MC	May 1997	May 2001	
	Brigadier General	Robert J. Kasulke	MC	May 2001	23 April 2005	Retired as a Major General
	Brigadier General	Stanley Flemming		23 April 2005	March 2009	
	Colonel			March 2009		
	Colonel	Kevin Pehr				
	Colonel					
	Colonel	Nelson G. Rosen	MC	June 2018	March 2019	Retired as a Brigadier General
	Colonel					
	Colonel					
	Colonel					

== Historic organization ==
=== 1978 ===
- HHC, 8th Medical Brigade, Fort Hamilton, New York
- 307th General Hospital, New York, New York
  - 1208th US Army Hospital, Brooklyn, New York
- 331st General Hospital, Utica, New York
  - 376th Combat Support Hospital, Liverpool, New York
- 338th General Hospital, Niagara Falls, New York
  - 817th Evacuation Hospital, Webster, New York
- 344th General Hospital, Flushing, New York
  - 74th Field Hospital, Bronx, New York
- 364th General Hospital, Albany, New York
  - 815th Station Hospital, Newburgh, New York
  - 816th Station Hospital, Binghampton, New York
- 320th Evacuation Hospital, New York, New York
- 343rd Evacuation Hospital, New York, New York
- 365th Evacuation Hospital, Niagara Falls, New York
- 808th Station Hospital, Hempstead, New York
  - 356th Station Hospital, Rocky Point, New York
- 310th Field Hospital, Malone, New York
- 1st Medical Detachment, Brooklyn, New York
- 315th Medical Detachment, Brooklyn, New York
