= 112th Medical Brigade =

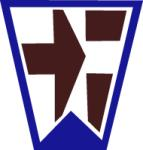
- Shoulder sleeve insignia
- Country: United States
- Allegiance: United States Army
- Type: Medical brigade
- Size: Brigade
- Part of: Ohio Army National Guard
- Garrison/HQ: Colombus, Ohio
- Motto: Help Always Ready
- Colors: Maroon and White

Insignia
- Distinctive unit insignia

The 112th Medical Brigade was a medical brigade of the Ohio Army National Guard headquartered in Colombus, Ohio. Its lineage is maintained by the Medical Detachment, Ohio National Guard

== Lineage and Honors ==
=== Lineage ===
- Organized 1 January 1904 as the Medical Department, Ohio National Guard
- Mustered into Federal service 14 July 1916 at Camp Willis, Ohio
- Mustered out of Federal service 1 April 1917 and reverted to state control
- Reorganized and redesignated 19 June 1917 as the Sanitary Train, Ohio National Guard
- Called into Federal service 15 July 1917
- Drafted into Federal service 5 August 1917
- Reorganized and redesignated 15 September 1917 as the 112th Sanitary Train, an element of the 37th Division
- Demobilized 12 April 1919 at Camp Sherman, Ohio
- Reorganized and Federally recognized 25 April 1921 in the Ohio National Guard as the 112th Medical Regiment, with Headquarters at Columbus, an element of the 37th Division
- Inducted into Federal service 15 October 1940 at home station
- Reorganized and redesignated 1 February 1942 as the 112th Medical Battalion an element of the 37th Infantry Division
- Inactivated 13 December 1945 at Camp Stoneman, California
- Reorganized and Federally recognized 9 October 1947 in the Ohio National Guard with Headquarters at Columbus
- Ordered into active Federal service 15 January 1952 at home stations
- (112th Medical Battalion [NGUS] organized and Federally recognized 15 January 1954 with Headquarters at Columbus)
- Released from active Federal service 15 June 1954 and reverted to state control; Federal recognition concurrently withdrawn from 112th Medical Battalion (NGUS)
- Relieved 15 February 1968 from assignment to the 37th Infantry Division; battalion concurrently broken up and its elements reorganized and redesignated as follows:
  - Headquarters and Company A as Headquarters and Headquarters Detachment, 112th Medical Battalion
  - (Companies B, C, and D as the 685th and 382nd Medical Companies and Company E, 113th Medical Battalion, respectively; hereafter separate lineages)
- Location of Headquarters and Headquarters Detachment, 112th Medical Battalion changed 1 August 1969 to Westerville, Ohio
- Reorganized and redesignated 1 February 1972 as Headquarters and Headquarters Detachment, 112th Medical Group; location concurrently changed to Worthington
- Reorganized and redesignated 1 July 1975 as Headquarters and Headquarters Detachment, 112th Medical Brigade
- Reorganized and redesignated 1 April 1977 as Headquarters and Headquarters Company, 112th Medical Brigade
- Location changed 1 May 1988 to Columbus, Ohio
- Reorganized and redesignated 1 September 1997 as Detachment 6, Headquarters, State Area Command, Ohio Army National Guard (Medical Detachment)
- Reorganized and redesignated 1 December 2002 as Ohio Army National Guard Medical Detachment

=== Honors ===
==== Campaign Participation Credit ====
- World War I
  - Ypres-Lys
  - Meuse-Argonne
  - Lorraine 1918
- World War II
  - Northern Solomons
  - Luzon (with arrowhead)

=== Decorations ===
- Meritorious Unit Commendation (Army), Streamer embroidered BOUGAINVILLE
- Meritorious Unit Commendation (Army), Streamer embroidered PACIFIC THEATER
- Philippine Republic Presidential Unit Citation, Streamer embroidered 17 OCTOBER 1944 TO 4 JULY 1945

== Insignia ==
=== Shoulder Sleeve Insignia ===
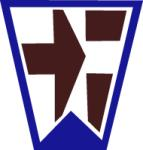
Shoulder Sleeve Insignia, 112th Medical Brigade

==== Description ====
On a blue wedge shape a pennant with forked tail in base, divided in half vertically with the white at left and maroon at right and bearing a Greek cross throughout, also divided vertically with maroon at left and white at right, the left side in the form of an arrowhead with point to the right.

==== Symbolism ====
The cross, symbolic of medical care, extends throughout indicating the authority of the headquarters. The maroon area at left, forming a directional pointer, suggests the flow of personnel from the forward combat area to the medical-care facility. The wedge shape of the device, with forked base and the color blue, alludes to the Ohio state flag.

==== Background ====
The design was approved 6 October 1976

=== Distinctive Unit Insignia ===
Distinctive Unit Insignia, 112th Medical Brigade

==== Description ====
A silver color metal and enamel device 1 inch (2.54 cm) in height overall consisting of a rectangular shield divided per chevron reversed, maroon above white, on the maroon portion the skull and horns of a Texas Longhorn steer in silver; on the white portion a conventionalized poppy and fleur-de-lis both of maroon. Attached below the shield a maroon arced segmented scroll inscribed "AUXILIUM SEMPER ADEST" in silver letters.

==== Symbolism ====
Maroon and white are the colors of the Medical Department. The skull and horns of the Texas Longhorn represent service on the Mexican Border, and the poppy and fleur-de-lis symbolize service in Flanders and in France, respectively, during World War I. The motto translates to "Help Always Ready."

==== Background ====
The distinctive unit insignia was originally approved for the 112th Medical Regiment on 3 July 1928. It was redesignated for the 112th Medical Battalion on 3 September 1943. It was redesignated for the 112th Medical Group on 25 September 1974. The insignia was redesignated for the 112th Medical Brigade on 14 August 1975.

== History ==
=== Between the World Wars ===
The 112th Sanitary Train was demobilized on 12 April 1919 at Camp Perry, Ohio. It was reconstituted in the National Guard in 1921 as the 112th Medical Regiment, assigned to the 37th Division and allotted to the state of Ohio. The Regimental Headquarters was organized and Federally recognized on 25 April 1921 at Colombus, Ohio.

The regiment, or elements of it, were called up to perform tornado relief duty at Lorain and Sandusky, Ohio from 24 June to 10 July 1924; relief duties in conjunction with the Ohio State Penitentiary riot and fire from 21 April to 4 May 1930, and relief duties for the Ohio River Flood during January and February 1937. Additionally, two ambulance companies provided relief after an explosion at the River Grove Mine in Belmont County on 16 March 1940.

The regiment conducted annual training at Camp Perry, Ohio most years between 1921 through 1939. The regiment was inducted into Federal service on 15 October 1940 at Cleveland, Ohio and was transferred to Camp Shelby, Mississippi on 20 October 1940.

=== The Medical Brigade ===
When he rejoined the Army as a commissioned officer, and before he returned to Active duty, Medal of Honor recipient Gordon Ray Roberts was a member of the 112th Medical Brigade.

== Commanders ==
Image	Rank	Name	Branch	Begin date	End date	Notes
		Unknown		February 1904	1917	
	Lieutenant Colonel	Dale Wilson	MC	1918	1918	Commanded 112th Sanitary Train
		Inactive		13 April 1919	24 April 1921	
	Colonel	Harry H. Snively	MC	25 April 1921	July 1931	Commanded 112th Medical Regiment
	Colonel	Harry D. Jackson	MC	3 August 1931	February 1942	Commanded 112th Medical Regiment until regiment was broken up
		Unknown		February 1942	1944	
	Lieutenant Colonel	William T. Holliday	MC	1944	1945	
	Lieutenant Colonel	Donald D. Forward	MC	1945	1945	
		Unknown		1945	1947	
	Lieutenant Colonel	Carl E. Dix	MC	1947	1947	
	Lieutenant Colonel	Joseph H. Geyer	MC	1948	1951	
	Lieutenant Colonel	Dale E. Putnam	MC	1952	1956	
	Lieutenant Colonel	Howard A. Laile	MC	1956	1961	
	Lieutenant Colonel	James M. Byers	MC	1961	1965	
	Lieutenant Colonel	James C. Good	MC	1965	1966	
	Lieutenant Colonel	John M. Summers	MC	1965	1968	
	Lieutenant Colonel	James C. Good	MC	1968	1972	Commanded 112th Medical Battalion
	Colonel	James C. Good	MC	1972	1973	Commanded 112th Medical Group
	Colonel	Paul J. Kopsch	MC	1973	1975	Commanded 112th Medical Group
	Brigadier General	James C. Good	MC	1975	1982	First Medical Corps officer to be promoted to Brigadier General in the Ohio National Guard.
	Brigadier General	Paul J. Kopsch	MC	1982	1 September 1984	
	Brigadier General	Aaron K. Warren	MC	1 September 1984	1989	
	Brigadier General	Jackie D. Stephenson	MC	1989	1992	
	Brigadier General	Charles O. Dillard	MC	1992	1995	
	Brigadier General	Lance A. Talmage	MC	1995	1 September 1997	Cased the brigade colors

== Organization ==
=== 1918 ===
- Headquarters, 112th Sanitary Train
  - Division Medical Supply Section
  - Camp Dispensaries x 8
- Headquarters, Ambulance Section
  - 145th Ambulance Company
  - 146th Ambulance Company
  - 147th Ambulance Company
  - 148th Ambulance Company
- Headquarters, Field Hospital Section
  - 145th Field Hospital Company
  - 146th Field Hospital Company
  - 147th Field Hospital Company
  - 148th Field Hospital Company

=== 112th Medical Group (Incomplete) ===
- HHD, 112th Medical Group
- 383rd Medical Company (Clearing)
- 385th Medical Company (Ambulance)

=== 112th Medical Brigade (Incomplete) ===
- HHC, 112th Medical Brigade, Colombus
- 145th Surgical Hospital (Mobile) (Army), Camp Perry
- 383rd Medical Company
- 385th Medical Company
- 684th Medical Company (Clearing)
- 2007th Medical Detachment (Dental Services)
