= 818th Medical Brigade =

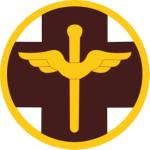
- Shoulder sleeve insignia
- Active: 1944-1946; 1952-1996
- Country: United States
- Allegiance: United States Army
- Type: Medical brigade
- Size: Brigade
- Part of: United States Army Reserve
- Garrison/HQ: Leige, Belgium; New York, New York; Fort Gillem, Georgia
- Motto: Leading in Care
- Colors: Maroon and White

Commanders
- Notable commanders: BG Frank B. Berry; BG James C. Crutcher

Insignia
- Distinctive unit insignia

The 818th Medical Brigade was a medical brigade of the United States Army Reserve and located in Liege, Belgium in World War II, then in New York City, and finally at Fort Gillem, Georgia.

== Lineage and honors ==
=== Lineage ===
- Constituted 27 October 1944 in the Army of the United States as the 818th Medical Service Detachment.
- Activated 22 November 1944 in Belgium
- Reorganized and redesignated 10 April 1945 as Headquarters and Headquarters Detachment, 818th Hospital Center.
- Inactivated 31 January 1946 in Belgium.
- Redesignated 12 August 1952 as Headquarters, 818th Hospital Center, allotted to the Army Reserve, and assigned to the First Army.
- Activated 1 September 1952 at New York, New York.
- Reorganized and redesignated 1 December 1955 as the 818th Medical Detachment.
- Reorganized and redesignated 1 June 1956 as Headquarters, 818th Hospital Center.
- Reorganized and redesignated 17 September 1992 as Headquarters and Headquarters Company, 818th Medical Brigade.
- Inactivated 9 August 1997 at Fort Gillem, Georgia.

=== Honors ===
==== Campaign participation credit ====
- World War II
  - Rhineland

=== Decorations ===
- None

== Insignia ==
=== Shoulder sleeve insignia ===
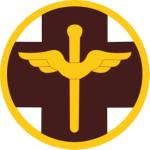
Shoulder Sleeve Insignia, 818th Medical Brigade

==== Description ====
On a white disc within a 1/8 inch (.32 cm) yellow border 2 3/4 inches (6.99 cm) in diameter overall, a cross throughout maroon, bearing a winged staff, all yellow.

==== Symbolism ====
Maroon and white are colors traditionally associated with medical organizations. The winged staff represents the mission of the unit. The yellow border symbolizes the complete and comprehensive support provided by the organization and continuity of service. Yellow or gold signifies excellence.

==== Background ====
The shoulder sleeve insignia was originally approved for the 818th Hospital Center on 12 October 1990. It was redesignated for the 818th Medical Brigade with the symbolism revised effective 17 September 1992. (TIOH Dwg. No. A-1-784)

=== Distinctive unit insignia ===
Distinctive Unit Insignia, 818th Medical Brigade

==== Description ====
A silver color metal and enamel device 1 1/8 inches (2.86 cm) in height overall consisting of a silver winged staff on a cross divided horizontally wavy maroon above blue surmounting and between two black snakes nowed, erect and respectant, all above and within a maroon scroll arcing to base and inscribed "LEADING IN CARE" in silver letters.

==== Symbolism ====
Maroon and white are colors traditionally associated with medical organizations. The winged staff and serpents, attributes of Aesculapius, the God of Medicine and Healing, together with the cross for aid and assistance, represent the basic mission of the unit. The wavy blue alludes to the parent unit's service in the Rhineland during World War II. Also, the twin serpents with their double loops together with the vertical arm of the cross, simulate the numerical designation of the organization.

==== Background ====
The distinctive unit insignia was originally approved for the 818th Hospital Center on 18 June 1979. It was redesignated for the 818th Medical Brigade with the description and symbolism revised effective 17 September 1992.

== History ==
=== World War II ===
The 818th Hospital Center was activated on 22 November 1944 under the authority of Organization Order 37, Communications Zone, European Theater of Operations, dated 22 November 1944. The organization formed with the publication of General Order 1, Headquarters 818th Medical Service Detachment (Hospital Center), dated 2 December 1944 announcing the assumption of command of the center by Captain John I. Spreckelmyer, Medical Administrative Corps (MAC). Spreckelmyer had been placed on temporary duty from the office of the command surgeon, advanced section, communications zone on 29 November 1944 to perform the advanced work to prepare for the arrival of other assigned personnel.

The permanently assigned personnel of the center, with the exception of the commander and chief nurse, who were both attending a conference in Paris, arrived in Liege, Belgium on 14 December 1944, at which time the center's dental surgeon, Lieutenant Colonel Richard H. Carnahan, Dental Corps (DG) as the senior officer present, assumed command of the center from CPT Spreckelmyer.

The center's commander, Colonel Robert B. Hill, Medical Corps (MC), arrived from Paris along with the chief nurse and assumed command from LTC Carnahan. Hill was a long serving Regular Army officer, having entered active duty in 1916 after graduating medical school at the University of Maryland. After serving in France for two years during and after World War I, he saw service along the Mexican Border at El Paso, Texas and Colombus, New Mexico before serving on the surgical staff at Walter Reed General Hospital from 1925 to 1930. He then moved to Fort Riley, Kansas, where he served as chief of surgery at the base hospital there, and chief of surgery at Sternberg General Hospital in Manila. At the start of the war, Hill was serving as chief of surgery at the hospital at the United States Military Academy, a position he held from 1939 to 1942, when he would move to Fitzsimmons General Hospital in Denver. Before deploying to Europe, he organized the 10th Hospital Center and the 5th Auxiliary Surgical Group and Mason General Hospital before going to Europe. He would be promoted to brigadier general in 1949. His assignment immediately before assuming command of the 818th was as the base section surgeon.

The center was headquartered at No 11 Avenue Rogier in Liege, and the mayor of Liege provided No 13 Avenue Rogier as an enlisted billeting facility, and officers were billeted in a hotel and at No. 5 Quai des Estas Unis. Both buildings were in poor shape due to bombing and occupation by the Germans, having suffered considerable damage due to bombing in the area. Although some work had been done on No 11, o 13 was not suitable for occupation by the end of the year. However, because of the tactical situation, most of the members of the unit ended up sleeping in the basement of the headquarters building.

The Battle of the Bulge began on the same day that the 818th became operational and affected all of its operations for the remainder of 1944 and into 1945. One of the first missions of the 93rd Medical Gas Treatment Battalion and the 25th and 32nd General Hospitals was to develop plans for emergency evacuation of their locations. Additionally, general hospitals found themselves operating in the roles of evacuation hospitals and even clearing companies; their primary duties becoming that of immediate classification and evacuation of patients, rather than comprehensive treatment and return to duty.

Evacuation became the main mission of the 818th. Patients were moved primarily by ambulance train, with the primary obstacle to their movement being the inability to predict when trains would arrive. Although limited in comparison to evacuation by train, air evacuation was used whenever possible, although the well-known weather problems associated with the Battle of the Bulge limited the number of patients who could be evacuated by air each day. Additionally, air evacuation holding units were designed to hold stabilized patients, not patients of the severity that were being evacuated from the hospitals of the 818th. In all, between 16 and 31 December 1944, some 12,166 patients were evacuated by train and another 1,993 were evacuated by air.

Enemy action was a constant concern, and attacks were almost continuous attacks occurred in the Liege area during the last two weeks of 1944. In addition to constant near misses, which caused damage to all facilities, on 17 December, a V-1 flying bomb struck the 76th General Hospital; two officers and 34 enlisted received minor injuries and the operating rooms, theater, dental clinic and pharmacy were damaged, as well as 19 tents. On 26 December the 28th General Hospital was struck by a V-1, destroying the admissions & dispositions office and the chaplain's office and shattering floors, windows and ceilings throughout the area, and wounding four officers and thirteen enlisted on staff, all of whom were hospitalized; additionally, one prisoner of war patient was killed and two were wounded. Additionally on 26 December the 76th General Hospital was strafed by the Germans, damaging two tents in the nurses' billeting area. No one was injured—although the hospital chief nurse was sleeping in one of the tents at the time, but the tents, as well as clothing and other possessions inside, were destroyed by what was determined to be 20mm shells. On 28 December, a deliberately set fire in the 28th General Hospital was discovered and extinguished and extinguished before significant damage could be done in what was felt to be an act of potential sabotage. And finally, on 29 December one bomb, exploding within a block of the 818th Headquarters undid most of the repair that had been performed to make the building usable. Glass was broken from eighteen large windows in the headquarters building, and the blast was of sufficient intensity to break the heavy frames of several inside wooden doors. Colonel Hill later recalled that "I can remember one thing about that particular phase of service. Bombs were falling around the [headquarters] and one came close and shattered glass windows. That's when I realized my age. Two boys on my own staff beat me to cover under my own desk.

In January through April 1945, in an effort to provide infantry replacements, units in the Army Service Forces were levied requirements to provide enlisted men as part of the Infantry Reconversion Program, and this resulted in each hospital assigned to the center losing an average of about 100 personnel apiece, many of whom were highly trained and experienced clerks and technicians, for a total of 806 enlisted personnel lost to the command. Additionally, 27 Medical Corps officers were exchanged for officers in other units who needed to be rotated out of their assignments due to the conditions they had experienced.

As spring advanced in 1945, and the collapse of Germany appeared more imminent, the hospital center began to prepare for post war occupation responsibilities. This included the development of teams composed of officers and enlisted personnel to meet several requirements:

- Hospitalization teams in forward areas, to provide medical service for the anticipated large numbers of Displaced Persons and Recovered Personnel as Allied armies penetrated further into Germany.
- "Profile teams," to perform the processing of U.S. military personnel necessary to determine their adjusted service rating scores.
- Screening teams, to provide required physical examinations for personnel in units alerted for redeployment.
- As supplementary dispensary groups, to provide medical service for units who lost their area medical support due to the redeployment of their supporting medical units.

At the same time, the hospitals of the Center established a number of schools to provide additional training for personnel. These included an athletic trainer inspector school, schools of tropical medicine (important for units preparing to redeploy for the anticipated fight against Japan), a medical field school, and basic courses in military medicine, surgery, anesthesia, radiology, psychiatry, and dermatology. Advanced courses in orthopedic surgery, infectious diseases, cardiovascular diseases, and gastroenterology.

The 818th Hospital Center had scarce1y begun to begin operations at its location in Liege, Belgium, by New Year's Day 1945. Operational procedures for the operation of the center and providing command and control over its subordinate units had to be developed through actual operating experience; it was impossible to develop hard and fast rules or policies since conditions were constantly subject to change without notice. Policies had to have enough flexibility to accommodate circumstances as they arose. Complications facing the organization were many and varied, intensified by the activities of the Ardennes Campaign, which began only two days after the headquarters arrived in Liege. The tactical situation presented a variety of situations affecting the missions of the hospital center, which was primarily to coordinate, expedite, and simplify the activities of six general hospitals, later increased to nine, and the other subsidiary units associated with them. The hospitals had been operating as direct reporting units of the Advance Section, Communications Zone, whose headquarters was located some 45 miles from the Liege area, where the hospitals were located. Under these conditions the most effective integration of the hospitals' activities and policies could not be secured. The first requirement of the new headquarters was, therefore, to provide for centralization and coordination of all common requirements of the hospitals and their associated units; to eliminate, as much as possible, unnecessary overlapping and duplication of effort; to relieve each hospital from as much a part of possible of its necessary non-professional tasks; and to facilitate in every way each installation in rendering intended effective professional services.

The initial obstacles confronting the Headquarters consisted primarily of disrupted transportation facilities, shortages of essential supplies, and the requirement to improvise policies at the spur of the moment to address exigencies as they arose at a time when every priority was being given to combat units. Communication shortcomings had to be made good, and success in solving operational problems could he achieved only by exercising constant resourcefulness. The need during this period for a central agency capable of ensuring the availability of existing mechanical, material, or personnel resources to all its installations was obvious. The hospital center played this role consistently, robbing Peter to pay Paul as necessity demanded. With every installation cooperating to the fullest extent, the system proved highly effective in ensuring the greatest good to the greatest number.

During periods of peak patient loads the problem of transportation was acute. This problem as partially solved by the addition of a provisional ambulance company consisting of the consolidated TO&E ambulances of the general hospitals to the 562nd Medical Company (Ambulance). The officers of the 562ndMedical Company administered both organizations. Ambulance service was provided on a twenty-four-hour basis, and there were periods when the only rest the drivers had was that obtained while waiting for their ambulances to be loaded.

=== The Army Reserve ===
In 1976, the headquarters of the 818th Hospital Center was relocated from New York City to Fort Gillem, Georgia, with an effective date of 15 July 1976. The Center's command and control mission in the northeast was assumed by the newly-activated 8th Medical Brigade, while the 818th was assigned command and control of all medical units assigned to the 81st Army Reserve Command, some 27 units in all, many subordinate to the hospitals or the medical battalion under its direct control.

== Commanders ==
Image	Rank	Name	Branch	Begin date	End date	Notes
	Captain	John I. Speckelmyer	MAC	2 December 1944	13 December 1944	Although the unit was formally activated on 22 November 1944, no personnel were assigned until 2 December 1944.
	Lieutenant Colonel	Richard H. Carnahan	DC	14 December 1944	15 December 1944	
	Colonel	Robert B. Hill	MC	16 December 1944		Regular Army Medical Corps officer who served in both World Wars, he retired as a Brigadier General in 1956.
	Colonel	Charles E. Brenn	MC		October 1945	
	Colonel				31 December 1946	
		Inactive		1 February 1946	31 August 1952	
	Brigadier General	Frank B. Berry	MC	1 September 1952	July 1953	Served as Assistant Secretary of Defense (Health and Medical) from 1954 to 1961; architect of the Berry Plan.
	Brigadier General	Perrin H. Long	MC	July 1953	10 December 1958	In 1943, as the Mediterranean Theater Medical Consultant, Long was appointed as part of a board of officers to investigate the George S. Patton slapping incidents.
	Brigadier General	David McCullagh Meyer	MC	10 December 1958	September 1961	Had served as a Dental Corps Officer in the Officer Reserve Corps, then attended Medical School and transferred to the Medical Corps.
	Brigadier General	August H. Groeschel	MC	September 1961	15 May 1967	
	Colonel	Kenneth H. Judy	MC	15 May 1967	28 February 1968	
	Brigadier General	John J. Dorsey	MC	28 February 1968	October 1971	Landed at Normandy on 6 June 1944.
	Brigadier General					
	Brigadier General	Aureliano H. Rivas-Flores, Jr.	MC	1973	15 July 1976	
	Brigadier General	James C. Crutcher	MC	15 July 1976		Assumed command when the Hospital Center relocated to Fort Gillem, Georgia. Served as Medical Director of the Veterans Administration.
	Brigadier General	Thomas S. Edwards	MC			In command in 1980.
	Brigadier General	Foster H. Marshall II	MC			In command in 1982.
	Brigadier General					
	Brigadier General	Stephen C. Boone	MC		March 1988	
	Brigadier General	Paul D. Webster	MC	March 1988	April 1992	
	Colonel					
	Colonel					

== Organization ==
=== 31 January 1945 ===
- Headquarters, 818th Hospital Center, Liege, Belgium
- 15th General Hospital, Citadelle, Liege, Belgium
- 25th General Hospital, Tongeren, Belgium
- 28th General Hospital, La Chartreuse, Liege, Belgium
- 32nd General Hospital, Aachen, Germany
- 56th General Hospital, Caserne Fonck, Liege, Belgium
- 76th General Hospital, Champs de Manoeuvres, Liege, Belgium
- 130th General Hospital, Cinoy, Belgium
- 298th General Hospital, Alleur, Liege, Belgium
- Detachment A, 14th Field Hospital, Hollonge, Liege, Belgium
- 562nd Medical Company (Ambulance), La Chartreuse, Belgium
- Headquarters and Headquarters Detachment, 93rd Medical Gas Treatment Battalion
  - Company B, 93rd Medical Gas Treatment Battalion

=== 20 October 1976 ===
- Headquarters and Headquarters Detachment, 818th Hospital Center, Fort Gillem, Georgia
- 3297th U.S. Army Hospital. Chamblee, Georgia
- 324th General Hospital, Miami, Florida
- 345th Combat Support Hospital, Jacksonville, Florida
- 301st Field Hospital, Gainesville, Florida
- 349th Combat Support Hospital, Saint Petersburg, Florida
- Headquarters and Headquarters Detachment, 429th Medical Battalion, Savannah, Georgia
- 382nd Field Hospital, Augusta, Georgia
- 349th Medical Detachment, Orlando, Florida
- 3299th Medical Detachment (Dental) (Team JA), Chamblee, Georgia
