= 426th Medical Brigade =

- Shoulder sleeve insignia
- Active: 1943-1946; 1948-1949; 1950-1958; 1986-2008
- Country: United States
- Allegiance: United States Army
- Type: Medical brigade
- Size: Brigade
- Part of: United States Army Reserve; 96th Army Reserve Command
- Garrison/HQ: Salt Lake City, Utah
- Motto: Readiness with Mercy
- Colors: Maroon and White

Insignia
- Distinctive unit insignia

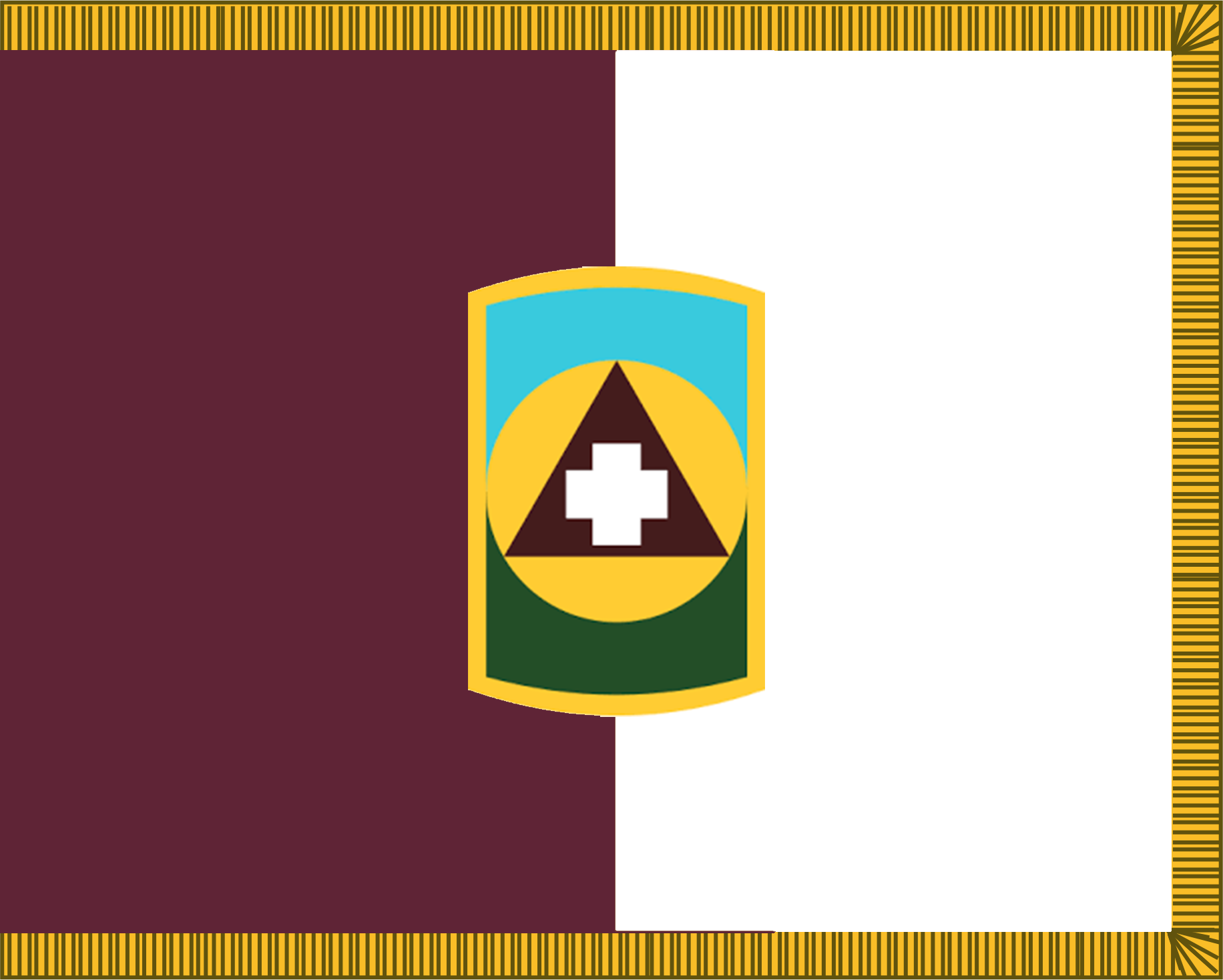
- 426th Medical Brigade Flag

The 426th Medical Brigade was a medical brigade of the United States Army Reserve subordinate to the 96th Army Reserve Command and headquartered in Salt Lake City, Utah.

== Lineage and Honors ==
=== Lineage ===
- Constituted 5 January 1943 in the Army of the United States as the 426th Medical Battalion, Motorized
- Activated 25 February 1943 at Camp Maxey, Texas
- Battalion broken up 25 September 1943 and its elements reorganized and redesignated as follows:
  - Headquarters and Headquarters Detachment as Headquarters and Headquarters Detachment, 426th Medical Battalion
  - (Companies A, B, and C as the 564th, 565th, and 566th Ambulance Companies, Motor – hereafter separate lineages)
- Inactivated 31 January 1946 in Germany
- Allotted 29 March 1948 to the Organized Reserve Corps
- Activated 20 April 1948 at Yakima, Washington
- Inactivated 28 November 1949 at Yakima, Washington
- Redesignated 18 August 1950 as Headquarters and Headquarters Detachment, 426th Medical Group
- Activated 1 September 1950 at San Francisco, California
- Location changed 1 March 1952 to Los Angeles, California
- (Organized Reserve Corps redesignated 9 July 1952 as the Army Reserve)
- Inactivated 1 January 1958 at Los Angeles, California
- Activated 16 April 1986 at Salt Lake City, Utah
- Reorganized and redesignated 16 September 1993 as Headquarters and Headquarters Company, 426th Medical Brigade
- Inactivated 15 October 2008 at Salt Lake City, Utah

=== Honors ===
==== Campaign Participation Credit ====
- World War II
  - Normandy
  - Northern France
  - Rhineland
  - Ardennes-Alsace
  - Central Europe

=== Decorations ===
- None

== Insignia ==
=== Shoulder Sleeve Insignia ===
Shoulder Sleeve Insignia, 426th Medical Brigade

==== Description ====
On a rectangle arced at the top and bottom with a 1/8 inch (.32 cm) gold border 2 inches (5.08 cm) in width and 3 inches (7.62 cm) in height overall, divided horizontally blue above green, a gold disc bearing a maroon triangle surmounted by a white cross.

==== Symbolism ====
Maroon and white are the colors traditionally associated with the Medical Corps; gold denotes excellence. The disc symbolizes mobility and quick response, and the triangle suggests the mountain state of Utah. The cross highlights medical care and compassion. The blue and green represent sky and grass and suggest life and the "Great Lifegiver."

==== Background ====
The shoulder sleeve insignia was approved on 3 August 1994. (TIOH Dwg. No. A-1-813)

=== Distinctive Unit Insignia ===
Distinctive Unit Insignia, 426th Medical Brigade

==== Description ====
A gold color metal and enamel device 1 1/8 inches (2.86 cm) in height overall consisting of a stylized gold caltrop upon a green equilateral triangle with, in base, a gold fleur-de-lis upon a red cross, and traversing the triangle a white wavy bar, all within a circular maroon scroll debruised by the top of the triangle and bearing the motto "READINESS WITH MERCY" in gold.

==== Symbolism ====
World War II action in Central Europe is represented by the green triangle which refers to the mountains of the Ardennes as well as the tents used by the predecessor organization for medical services and support during hostilities. The wavy white band represents the Rhineland, the Rhine River, and the winter snows of the region. France is represented by the fleur-de-lis. The gold caltrop, in the triangular form of the beechnut, symbolizes land war in Europe and recalls the beech forests of Ardennes-Alsace.

==== Background ====
The distinctive unit insignia was originally approved for the 426th Medical Group on 8 November 1985. It was redesignated for the 426th Medical Brigade with the description and symbolism revised effective 16 September 1993.

== Commanders ==
Image	Rank	Name	Branch	Begin date	End date	Notes
	Lieutenant Colonel					
	Lieutenant Colonel	Murray Polsky	MC			
		Inactive		1 February 1946	19 April 1948	
	Lieutenant Colonel					
		Inactive		29 November 1949	31 August 1950	
	Colonel					
	Colonel					
	Colonel					
	Colonel					
	Colonel					
		Inactive		2 January 1958	15 April 1986	
	Colonel					
	Colonel	Carvel H. Evans	MC		19 September 1987	
	Colonel	Alfred W. Mickle	MC	20 September 1987	9 November 1991	
	Colonel	Richard F. Abbott	MS	10 November 1991		
	Colonel					
	Colonel	A. Wayne Mickle	MC			In command of 426th Medical Brigade in 1995.
