= 18th Medical Command =

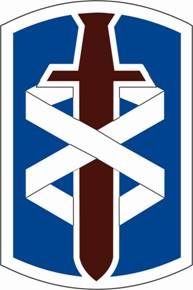
- Shoulder sleeve insignia
- Active: 1967 - present
- Country: United States
- Branch: United States Army
- Part of: United States Army Pacific
- Garrison/HQ: Fort Shafter, Hawaii
- Motto: Trust - Labor - Courage

Commanders
- Current commander: MG E. Darrin Cox
- Notable commanders: LTG James B. Peake

Insignia
- Distinctive unit insignia

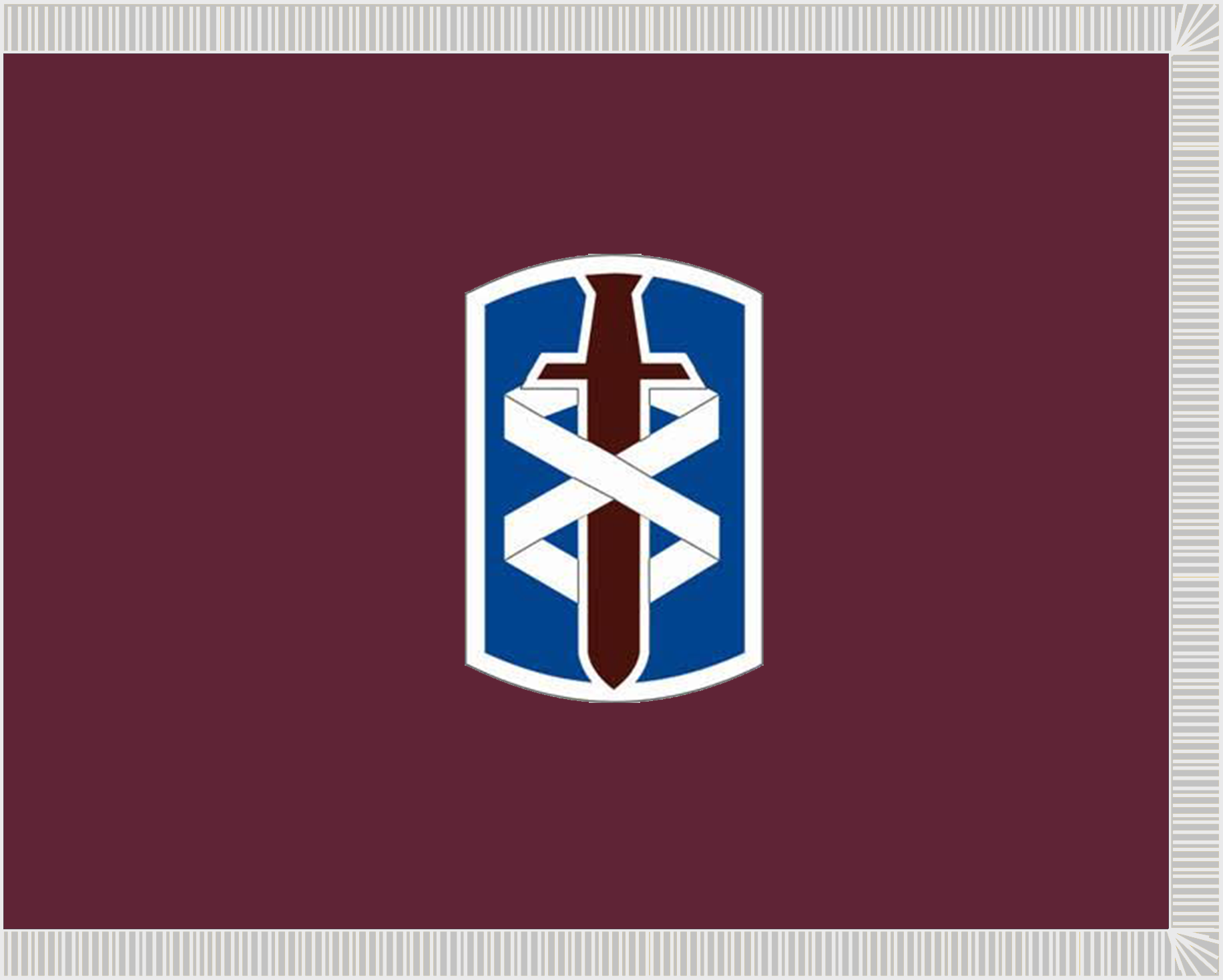
- 18th Medical Command Flag

The 18th Theater Medical Command (18 TMC) is a US Army medical theater enabling command, which provides operational medical support to United States Army, Pacific. The headquarters was located on the Korean peninsula from 1984 until 2008, when it was relocated to Fort Shafter, Hawaii.

Originally activated at Fort Lee, Virginia in 1967 as the 18th Medical Brigade, it was the U.S. Army's third field army level medical headquarters activated, following the 7th Medical Brigade in 1965 and the 44th Medical Brigade in 1966.

== Lineage and Honors ==
=== Lineage ===
- Constituted 10 May 1967 in the Regular Army as Headquarters and Headquarters Detachment, 18th Medical Brigade
- Activated 18 August 1967 at Fort Lee, Virginia
- Inactivated 16 December 1970 at Fort George G. Meade, Maryland
- Redesignated 16 August 1984 as Headquarters and Headquarters Company, 18th Medical Command, and activated in Korea
- Reduced to Zero Strength 15 October 2008 in Korea
- Transferred, less Personnel and Equipment, 16 October 2008 to Fort Shafter, Hawaii and assigned to United States Army Pacific
- Redesignated 17 July 2025 as Headquarters and Headquarters Company, 18th Theater Medical Command.

=== Honors ===
==== Campaign Participation Credit ====
- None

==== Decorations ====
- Army Superior Unit Award, streamer embroidered "2003"

== Insignia ==
=== Shoulder sleeve insignia ===
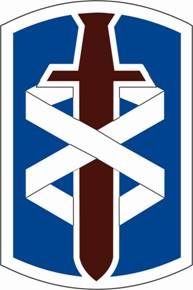
Shoulder Sleeve Insignia, 18th Theater Medical Command

==== Description ====
On a shield, oblong in shape and arched at both sides, 3 inches (7.62cm) in height and 2 inches (5.08cm) in width, within a 1/8 inch (.32cm) white border a field of blue having a white-edged maroon sword throughout the center with point down and entwined about the blade two white zig-zag bands in the form of a figure eight.

==== Symbolism ====
The sword is in the color maroon, suggestive of human blood, and symbolic of the medical needs of an army. The zig-zag bands are in pure white to suggest bandaging and the antiseptic requirements of medical practice; by entwining the sword, they signify the support provided by the organization.

==== Background ====
The shoulder sleeve insignia was originally approved for the 18th Medical Brigade on 25 October 1967. It was redesignated for the 18th Medical Command on 16 February 1984. (TIOH Drawing Number A-1-469)

=== Distinctive unit insignia ===
Distinctive Unit Insignia, 18th Medical Command

==== Description ====
A device of gold color metal and enamel 1 1/8 inches (2.86cm) in height consisting of a gold sun of eighteen rays bearing in center a maroon Maltese Cross all centered on a gold disc scored with concentric rays and enclosed by a maroon motto scroll bearing the words "Trust, Labor, Courage" in gold letters; over the lower half of the scroll a wreath of gold oak leaves entwined by two white serpents their tails crossed in center, their heads raised at either side and facing outward.

==== Symbolism ====
The gold sun and maroon cross are symbolic of the support provided by the organization. The Maltese Cross is the symbol of the Knights of Malta, also called Knights Hospitaler, Knights of St. John, and Order of the Hospital of St. John, which grew out of a hospital established in the 11th Century to care for pilgrims in the Holy Land. The eighteen rays of the sun allude to the unit's numerical designation. The serpents reference the Staff of Aesculapius of the Medical Corps insignia, and the oak symbolizes strength.

==== Background ====
The distinctive unit insignia was originally approved for the 18th Medical Brigade on 29 February 1968. It was redesignated on 16 February 1984 for the 18th Medical Command.

== Commanders ==
Image	Rank	Name	Branch	Begin date	End date	Notes
	Colonel	Charles R. Kinney	MS	18 August 1967	14 March 1968	First Medical Service Corps officer to command a medical brigade
	Colonel	Jack W. Gwin	MS	15 March 1968	19 June 1969	Assumed command when brigade was transferred to Fort Meade, less personnel
	Colonel	William R. Knowles	MS	19 June 1969	2 July 1970	
	Colonel	Leigh F. Wheeler, Sr.	MS	3 July 1970	16 December 1970	Colonel Wheeler assumed command of the 44th Medical Brigade when the 18th Medical Brigade was reflagged as the 44th.
		Inactive		17 December 1970	15 August 1984	
Richard T. Travis	Colonel	Richard T. Travis	MC	16 August 1984	June 1985	Commanded 8th Medical Command (Provisional) from June 1983 to 15 August 1984. Also commanded 7th Medical Command in Germany. Retired as a Major General.
	Colonel	D. G. Tsoulos	MC	June 1985	June 1987	Later commanded 3rd Medical Command during Operation Desert Storm
	Colonel	Thomas E. Bowen	MC	June 1987	June 1988	Retired as a Brigadier General
	Colonel	James B. Peake	MC	June 1988	July 1990	Later served as 43rd Surgeon General of the United States Army and Secretary of Veterans Affairs
	Colonel	James J. James	MC	July 1990	December 1991	Retired as a Brigadier General
Harold L. Timboe	Colonel	Harold L. Timboe	MC	December 1991	August 1993	Later commander 44th Medical Brigade, Brooke Army Medical Center, and Walter Reed Army Medical Center. Retired as a Major General.
	Colonel	Elmer Michael Casey, Jr.	MC	August 1993	July 1996	
	Colonel	Daniel F. Perugini	MC	July 1996	July 1998	Retired as a Brigadier General
	Colonel	James Kirkpatrick	MC	July 1998		
	Colonel	Edward C. Huycke	MC		July 2002	
	Colonel	Phillip Volpe	MC	July 2002	July 2004	Retired as a Major General
	Colonel	Brian D. Allgood	MC	June 2004	23 June 2006	Killed in action in Iraq, 20 January 2007. Namesake of the Brian D. Allgood Community Hospital, Yongsan Garrison
	Colonel	James Gregory Jolissaint	MC	23 June 2006	June 2008	
	Colonel	Jeffrey B. Clark	MC	June 2008	15 October 2008	Assumed command of the 65th Medical Brigade when the 18th MEDCOM moved to Hawaii. Retired as a Major General.
		Relocated to Hawaii		15 October 2008	16 October 2008	Transferred less personnel and equipment
	Lieutenant Colonel	Chad Bowers	MS	16 October 2008	July 2009	
	Colonel	Erin Edgar	MC	July 2009	June 2011	
	Colonel	Judith Bock	AN	June 2011	3 July 2013	
	Colonel	Brett Ackerman	MC	3 July 2013	10 July 2014	
	Colonel	Ann Sammartino	AN	10 July 2014	3 March 2018	
	Colonel	Edward H. Bailey	MC	3 March 2018	20 October 2018	Retired as a Brigadier General
	Brigadier General	Tracy L. Smith	MS	20 October 2018	July 2020	USAR Officer on extended active duty
	Major General	Michael L. Place	MC	July 2020	June 2022	
	Major General	Paula C. Lodi	MS	June 2022	July 2024	

== Organization ==
=== Fort Meade, Maryland, 1 January 1970 ===
- HHD, 18th Medical Brigade
- 10th Evacuation Hospital
- 28th General Hospital (inactivated 28 December 1970)
- 29th Surgical Hospital (Mobile) (Army) (Inactivated 15 May 1970)
- 157th Medical Laboratory (Inactivated 28 December 1970)
- 591st Medical Company (Ambulance)
- 702d Medical Company (Clearing)
- 888th Medical Company (Ambulance) (Inactivated 1 February 1970)
- 177th Medical Detachment (Orthopedic) (Inactivated 30 April 1970)
- 212th Medical Detachment (RA) (Helicopter Ambulance)
- 232d Medical Detachment (Surgical) (Inactivated 30 April 1970)
- 249th Medical Detachment (Supply)
- 630th Medical Detachment (Medical Maintenance)

=== Korea, 23 June 2006 ===
- HHC, 18th Medical Command
- 618th Theater Dental Command
- 121st General Hospital
  - 127th Forward Surgical Team
  - 135th Surgical Team
- 106th Theater Veterinary Command
- 168th Medical Battalion (Area Support)
- 52nd Medical Battalion (Evacuation)
- 16th Medical Logistics Battalion
