= 213th Medical Brigade =

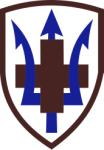
- Shoulder sleeve insignia
- Active: 1972-1995
- Country: United States
- Allegiance: United States Army
- Type: Medical brigade
- Size: Brigade
- Part of: Mississippi Army National Guard
- Garrison/HQ: Jackson, Mississippi
- Motto: Service Peace or War
- Colors: Maroon and White

Insignia
- Distinctive unit insignia

The 213th Medical Brigade was a medical brigade of the Mississippi Army National Guard with its headquarters in Jackson, Mississippi. It controlled medial units of the Army National Guard in Mississippi and Louisiana.

== Lineage and Honors ==
=== Lineage ===
- Organized and Federally recognized 23 October 1952 in the Mississippi Army National Guard at Jackson as the Medical Detachment, 114th Engineer Combat Battalion (NGUS)
- Redesignated 13 May 1953 as the Medical Detachment, 114th Engineer Battalion (NGUS)
- Reorganized and redesignated 1 May 1959 as Headquarters Detachment, 106th Medical Battalion, and Element of the 31st Infantry Division
- Ordered into active Federal service 30 September 1962 at Jackson; released 5 October 1962 from active Federal service and reverted to state control.
- Reorganized and redesignated 1 May 1963 as Company D, 106th Medical Battalion
- Relived 15 February 1968 from assignment to the 31st Infantry Division; concurrently consolidated with Headquarters and Headquarters Detachment, 213th Medical Battalion (organized and Federally recognized 25 September 1956 at Jackson), and consolidated unit designated as Headquarters and Headquarters Detachment, 213th Medical Battalion
- Reorganized and redesignated 1 February 1972 as Headquarters and Headquarters Detachment, 213th Medical Group
- Reorganized and redesignated 1 March 1975 as Headquarters and Headquarters Detachment, 213th Medical Brigade
- Reorganized and redesignated 1 July 1977 as Headquarters and Headquarters Company, 213th Medical Brigade
- Consolidated 1 September 1995 with the 134th Surgical Hospital, and consolidated unit designated as the 134th Combat Support Hospital
- Home station: Jackson, Mississippi

=== Honors ===
==== Campaign Participation Credit ====
- None

=== Decorations ===
- None

== Insignia ==
=== Shoulder Sleeve Insignia ===
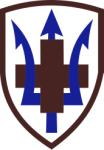
Shoulder Sleeve Insignia, 213th Medical Brigade

==== Description ====
On a white shield arced at top, 2 1/4 inches (5.72 cm) in width overall within a 1/8 inch (.32 cm) maroon border, a maroon Greek cross and blue trident interlaced.

==== Symbolism ====
Maroon and white are the colors used for the Army Medical Department. The cross, a symbol for aid and assistance, alludes to the basic mission of the organization. The blue trident, attribute of Neptune, "Father of Waters" refers to the Mississippi River and to the State of Mississippi, present home area of the Brigade.

==== Background ====
The shoulder sleeve insignia was approved on 6 September 1975. (TIOH Dwg. No. A-1-588)

=== Distinctive Unit Insignia ===
Distinctive Unit Insignia, 213th Medical Brigade

==== Description ====
A silver color metal and enamel device 1 1/8 inches (2.86 cm) in height overall consisting of a maroon cross terminating at the top in a trident, surmounted by a silver serpent the tail entwining the vertical bar of the cross, and upon a silver scroll arched at the top of the inscription "SERVICE" and enveloping the base "PEACE OR WAR" in black letters.

==== Symbolism ====
Maroon and white (silver) are the colors used for the Army Medical Department. The unit's medical mission is represented by the serpent, an ancient symbol for healing and the cross which alludes to the red cross emblematic of aid in distress. The trident at the top, suggested by the crest of the Mississippi Army National Guard, refers to the Mississippi River.

==== Background ====
The distinctive unit insignia was originally approved for the 213th Medical Battalion on 9 October 1967. It was redesignated for the 213th Medical Group on 16 May 1972. The insignia was redesignated for the 213th Medical Brigade on 13 May 1975.

== Commanders ==
Image	Rank	Name	Branch	Begin date	End date	Notes
	Brigadier General	Thomas K. Williams	MC	1969	1980	Had been in command of the 213th Medical Battalion since at least 1969, then the 213th Medical Group for its entire existence before assuming command of the 213th Medical Brigade
	Brigadier General	Clinton E. Wallace	MC	1980	1983	
	Brigadier General	Wafford H. Merrill, Jr.	MC	1983	October 1988	Retired as a Major General
	Brigadier General	James D. Polk	MC	October 1988	31 June 1995	Cased the Brigade colors.

== Organization ==
- HHD, 213th Medical Group, Jackson
- 134th Surgical Hospital (Mobile) (Army), Jackson
- 123rd Medical Company (Air Ambulance), Tupelo & Meridien
- 972nd Medical Detachment (Dental), Jackson
- HHC, 213th Medical Brigade, Jackson
- 134th Combat Support Hospital, Jackson
- 123rd Medical Company (Air Ambulance), Tupelo & Meridien
- 972nd Medical Detachment (Dental), Jackson
