= 7th Medical Brigade =

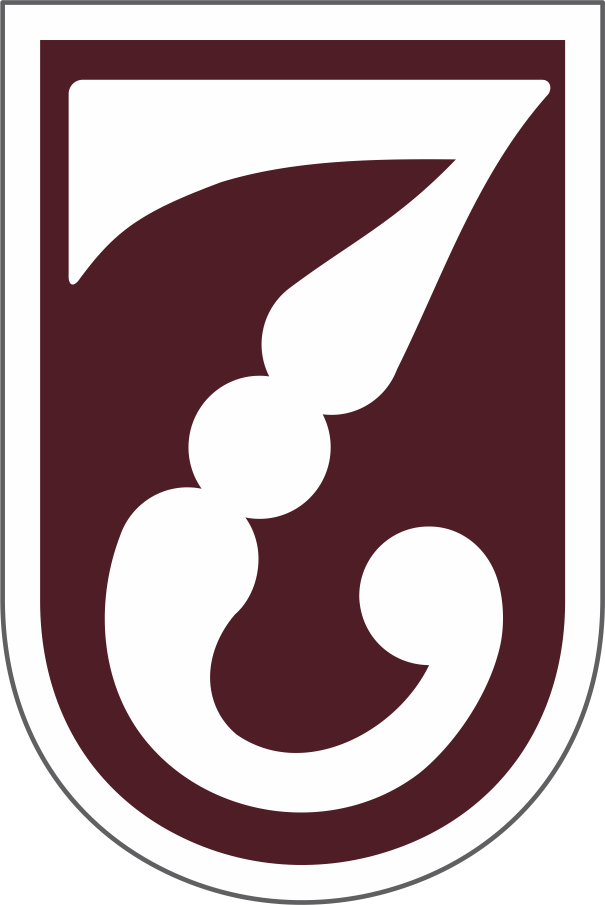
- Shoulder sleeve insignia
- Active: 21 June 1965 - 21 July 1973
- Country: United States
- Branch: United States Army
- Garrison/HQ: Coffey Barracks, Ludwigsburg, Germany
- Motto: Service Over Self

Commanders
- Notable commanders: MG Spencer B. Reid

Insignia
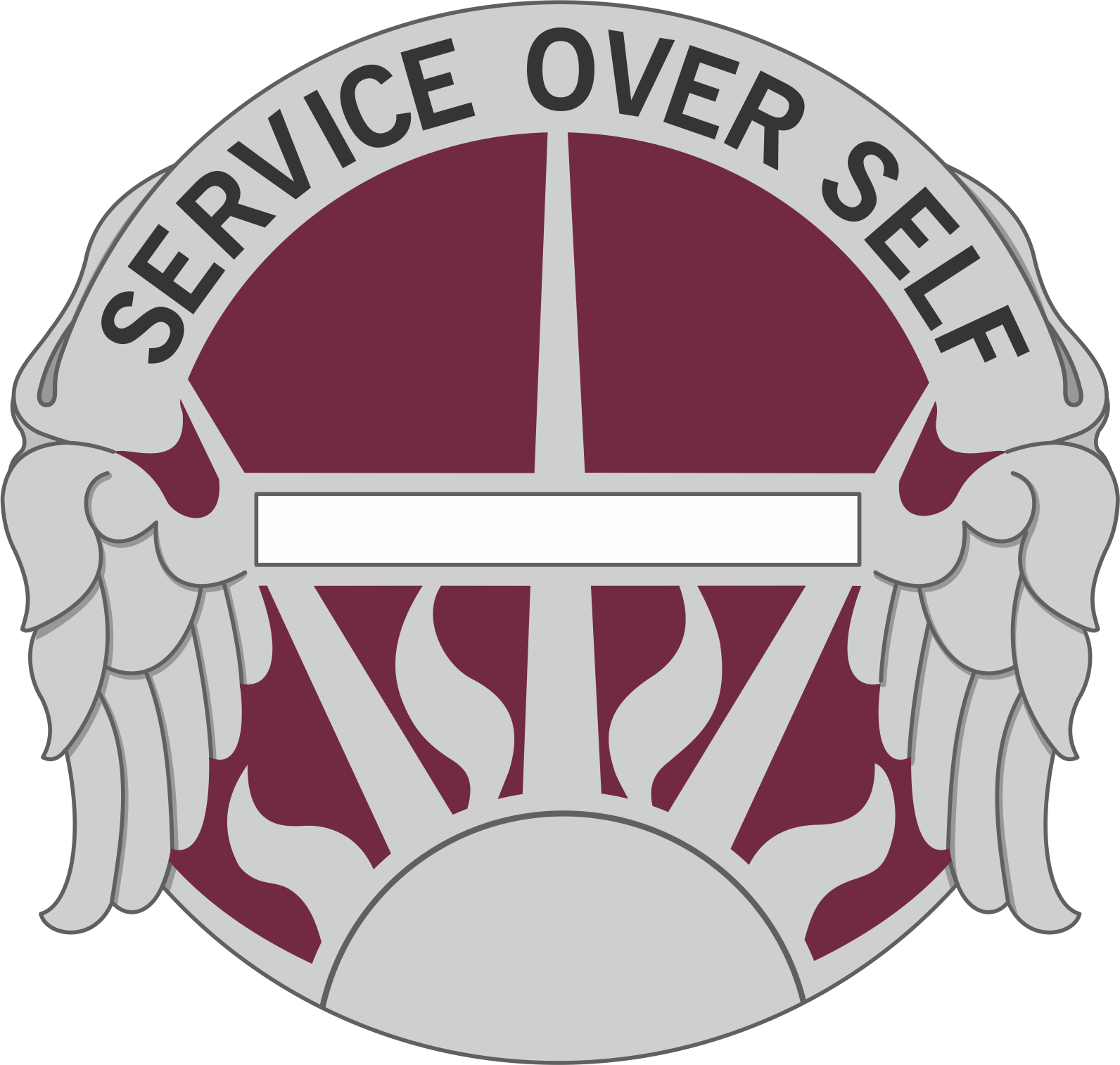
- Distinctive unit insignia

The 7th Medical Brigade was a US Army medical brigade, which provided medical support to Seventh Army. The brigade headquarters was located at Coffey Barracks Ludwigsburg, Germany, and the brigade was assigned to the Seventh Army Support Command and, later, under the United States Army Medical Command, Europe. The 7th Medical Brigade was the U.S. Army's first medical brigade to be activated.

== Lineage and honors ==
=== Lineage ===
- Constituted 1965
- Activated 21 June 1965 in Germany
- Inactivated 21 July 1973 in Germany

=== Honors ===
==== Campaign participation credit ====
- None

==== Decorations ====
- None

== Insignia ==
=== Shoulder sleeve insignia ===
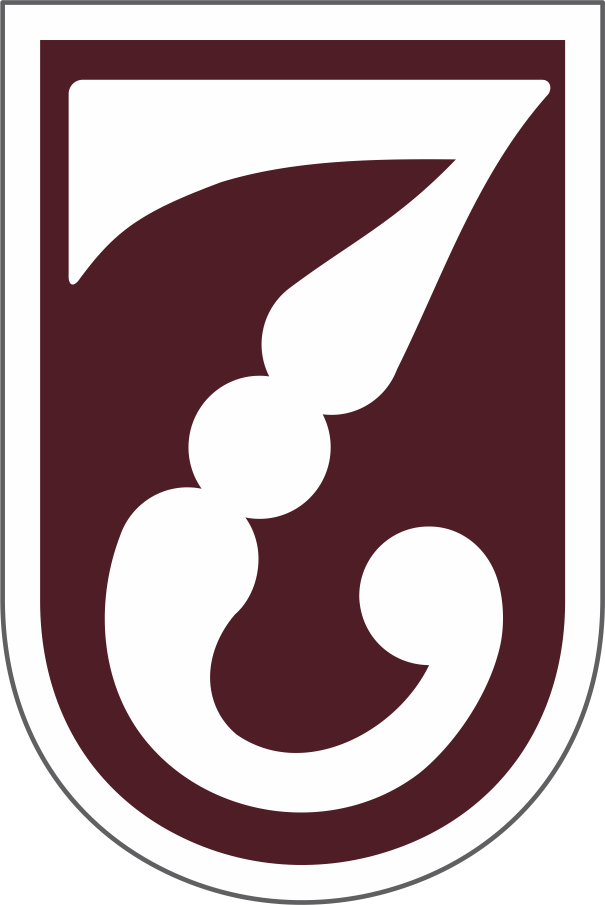
Shoulder Sleeve Insignia, 7th Medical Brigade

==== Description ====
On a rectangular maroon shield rounded at the bottom, 3 inches (7.62 cm) in height and 2 inches (5.08 cm) on width overall, within a 1/8 inch (.32 cm) white border, a white fleam.

==== Symbolism ====
The colors maroon and white are used to denote medical activities. The fleam is a heraldic symbol for a surgical lancet and its form simulates the unit's numerical designation.

==== Background ====
The shoulder sleeve insignia was approved on 21 February 1966. (TIOH Dwg. No. A-1-412)

=== Distinctive unit insignia ===
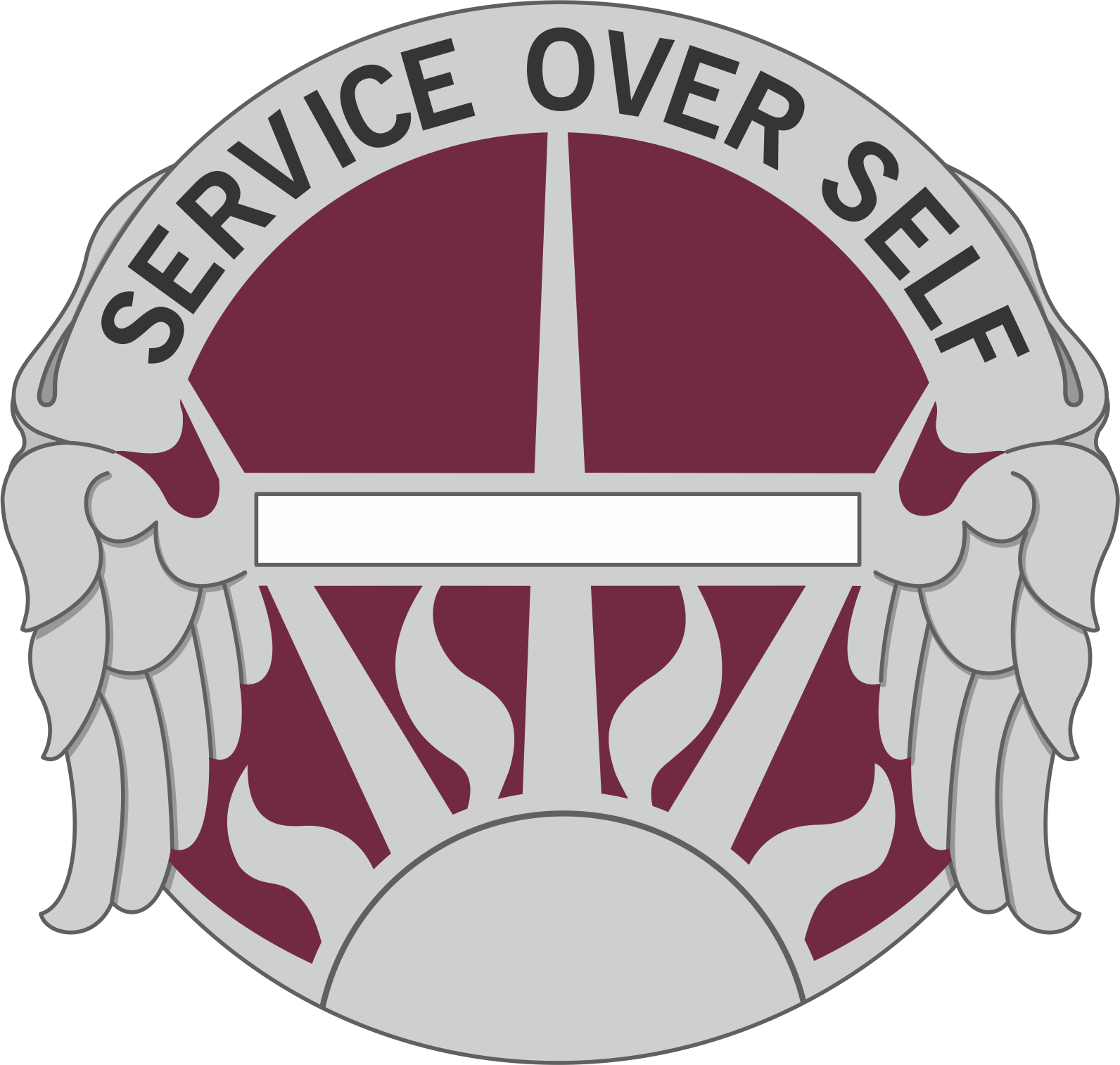
Distinctive Unit Insignia, 7th Medical Brigade

==== Description ====
A silver color metal and enamel device consisting of a maroon disc 1 1/8 inches (2.86 cm) in height with a silver sun of seven rays rising from its base, the second, fourth and sixth rays straight and throughout and behind a white horizontal band across the center portion of the disc, with, at teach end, a vertical silver wing reversed on, and extending beyond the edge of the disc. At the top on a silver scroll that follows the curve of the disc and overlaps the top of the wings, the inscription "SERVICE OVER SELF" in black letters.

==== Symbolism ====
Maroon and white are the colors used for Army Medical Service; the disc simulates a wheel and refers to the unit's ability to operate fixed or mobile. The white band represents both air and emergency field evacuation as well as alluding to first aid dressings and bandages. The rising sun symbolizes the steadfast reliability of the organization, with the seven rays signifying the numerical designation, and the three long straight rays to the physical, mental and spiritual aspects of man, the object of this duty.

==== Background ====
The distinctive unit insignia was approved on 14 February 1967.

== Commanders ==
Image	Rank	Name	Branch	Begin date	End date	Notes
Spencer B. Reid	Colonel	Spencer Beil Reid	MC		July 1967	Assumed command of the U.S. Army Hospital Wurzburg. Would later command the United States Army Medical Command, Europe and retired as a Major General.
	Colonel	Warren S. Henderson		July 1967	June 1968	Came to the 7th Medical Brigade from his position as Commander, 62d Medical Group.
	Colonel	Roger A. Juel	MC	June 1968		Had been serving as commander of 30th Medical Group
	Colonel	Wallace R. LeBourdais	MC		July 1971	Assumed command of U.S. Army Hospital, Augsburg
	Colonel	Harry J. Misch	MC	July 1971		Had been serving as commander of 30th Medical Group

== Organization ==
As of 1 July 1966

- Headquarters and Headquarters Detachment, 7th Medical Brigade
- 30th Medical Group
  - 4th Surgical Hospital (Mobile) (Army)
  - 32d Surgical Hospital (Mobile) (Army)
  - 128th Evacuation Hospital (Semi-mobile)
- 31st Medical Group
  - 36th Medical Battalion
  - 5th Surgical Hospital (Mobile) (Army)
  - 31st Surgical Hospital (Mobile) (Army)
  - 7th Evacuation Hospital (Semi-mobile)
- 62d Medical Group
  - 46th Surgical Hospital (Mobile) (Army)
  - 2d Surgical Hospital (Mobile) (Army)
  - 8th Evacuation Hospital (Semi-mobile)
  - 15th Evacuation Hospital (Semi-mobile)

== See also ==
- List of former United States Army medical units
