= 139th Regiment =

139th Regiment may refer to:

- 139th Infantry Regiment (United States)
- 139th (Mixed) Heavy Anti-Aircraft Regiment, Royal Artillery
- 139th (4th London) Field Regiment, Royal Artillery

== American Civil War regiments ==
- 139th Illinois Infantry Regiment
- 139th Indiana Infantry Regiment
- 139th New York Infantry Regiment
- 139th Ohio Infantry Regiment
- 139th Pennsylvania Infantry Regiment

== See also ==
- 139th Division (disambiguation)
- 139th (disambiguation)
