= 139th =

139th may refer to:

- 139th (Northumberland) Battalion, CEF, unit in the Canadian Expeditionary Force during the First World War
- 139th (Nottinghamshire and Derbyshire) Brigade, infantry brigade of the British Army that saw active service in World War I
- 139th Aero Squadron, Air Service, United States Army unit that fought on the Western Front during World War I
- 139th Airlift Squadron, unit of the New York Air National Guard 109th Airlift Wing Stationed at Stratton Air National Guard Base, Schenectady, New York
- 139th Airlift Wing, unit of the Missouri Air National Guard, stationed at Rosecrans Air National Guard Base, St. Joseph, Missouri
- 139th Delaware General Assembly, meeting of the legislative branch of the state government, consisting of the Delaware Senate and House of Representatives
- 139th Georgia General Assembly succeeded the 138th and served as the precedent for the 140th General Assembly in 1989
- 139th Illinois Volunteer Infantry Regiment, infantry regiment that served in the Union Army during the American Civil War
- 139th Indiana Infantry Regiment served in the Union Army between June 5, 1864, and September 29, 1865, during the American Civil War
- 139th Intelligence Squadron, the newest unit of the Georgia Air National Guard, focusing on intelligence operations
- 139th Medical Brigade, a subordinate command of the 807th Medical Command (Deployment Support), headquartered in Independence, MO
- 139th meridian east, line of longitude across the Arctic Ocean, Asia, the Pacific Ocean, Australasia, the Indian Ocean, the Southern Ocean, and Antarctica
- 139th meridian west, line of longitude across the Arctic Ocean, North America, the Pacific Ocean, the Southern Ocean, and Antarctica
- 139th New York State Legislature
- 139th New York Volunteer Infantry Regiment, infantry regiment of Union Army in the early years of the American Civil War
- 139th Ohio Infantry, an infantry regiment in the Union Army during the American Civil War
- 139th Open or 2010 Open Championship Mark Calcavecchia
- 139th Pennsylvania Infantry, infantry regiment in the Union Army during the American Civil War
- 139th Rifle Division (Soviet Union), infantry division of the Red Army, formed three times during World War II
- 139th Street (Manhattan), New York
- Connecticut's 139th assembly district, one of 151 Connecticut House of Representatives districts
- Pennsylvania's 139th Representative District, located in Pike County, Pennsylvania and Wayne County, Pennsylvania

== See also ==
- 139 (disambiguation)
