= 307th Brigade =

307th Brigade may refer to:

- 307th Brigade, Royal Field Artillery, United Kingdom
- 307th Infantry Brigade, United Kingdom
- 307th Medical Brigade, United States

== See also ==
- 307th Regiment (disambiguation)
- 307th (disambiguation)
