= 176th Brigade =

176th Brigade may refer to:

- 176th (2/1st Staffordshire) Brigade, United Kingdom
- 176th Engineer Brigade, United States
- 176th Medical Brigade, United States

== See also ==
- 176th Regiment (disambiguation)
