= 330th Medical Brigade =

- Shoulder sleeve insignia
- Active: 1944-1946; 1947-1963; 1969-Present
- Country: United States
- Branch: United States Army Reserve
- Type: Medical brigade
- Size: Brigade
- Part of: 807th Medical Command
- Colors: Maroon and White

Commanders
- Current commander: Colonel Amy Luer
- Notable commanders: BG Jonathan Woodson

Insignia
- Distinctive unit insignia

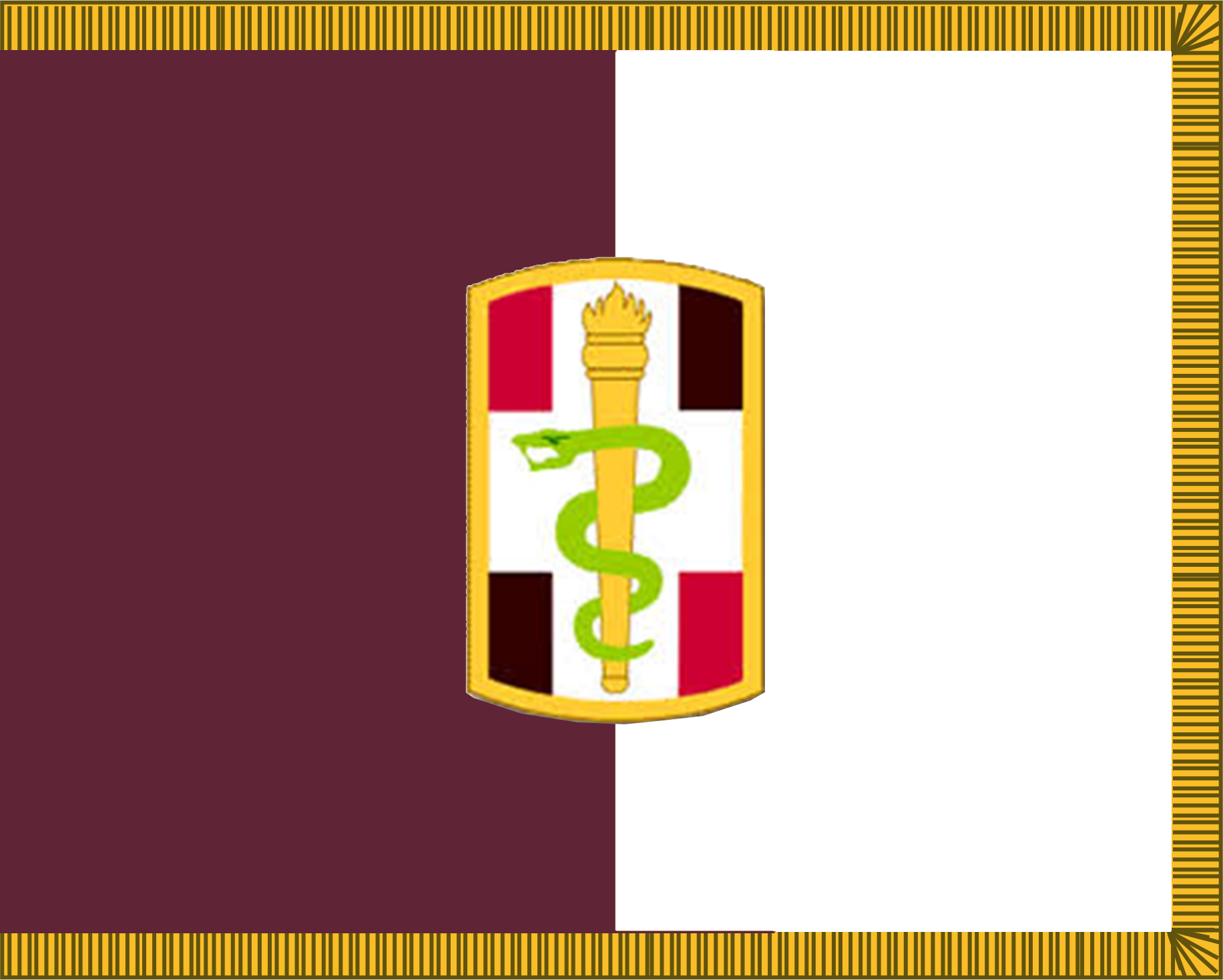
- 330th Medical Brigade Flag

The 330th Medical Brigade is a medical brigade of the United States Army Reserve subordinate to the 807th Medical Command with its headquarters at Fort Sheridan, Illinois.

== Current organization ==
The 330th Medical Brigade is a subordinate unit of the 807th Theater Medical Command. As of January 2026 the brigade consists of the following units:

- 330th Medical Brigade, at Fort Sheridan (IL)
  - Headquarters and Headquarters Company, 330th Medical Brigade, at Fort Sheridan (IL)
  - 172nd Medical Battalion (Multifunctional), in Ogden (UT)
    - Headquarters and Headquarters Detachment, in Ogden (UT)
    - 12th Medical Detachment (Preventive Medicine), in Machesney Park (IL)
    - 180th Medical Detachment (Preventive Medicine), in Machesney Park (IL)
    - 345th Medical Company (Ground Ambulance), at Fort Des Moines (IA)
    - 361st Medical Company (Logistics), at Fort Des Moines (IA)
    - 409th Medical Company (Area Support), in Madison (WI)
    - 410th Medical Company (Logistics), in Milwaukee (WI)
    - 467th Medical Detachment (Combat and Operational Stress Control — COSC), in Madison (WI)
    - 477th Medical Company (Ground Ambulance), in Duluth (MN)
    - 719th Medical Detachment (Veterinary Services), at Fort Sheridan (IL)
    - 785th Medical Detachment (Combat and Operational Stress Control — COSC), at Fort Snelling (MN)
    - 903rd Medical Detachment (Preventive Medicine), in Machesney Park (IL)
    - 949th Medical Detachment (Veterinary Services), in Ames (IA)
    - 983rd Medical Detachment (Preventive Medicine), at Fort Snelling (MN)
  - 374th Hospital Center, at Fort Sheridan (IL)
    - Headquarters and Headquarters Detachment, at Fort Sheridan (IL)
    - 452nd Field Hospital (32 Bed), in Milwaukee (WI)
      - Headquarters and Headquarters Detachment, in Milwaukee (WI)
      - 307th Medical Detachment Team (Forward Resuscitative and Surgical), in Milwaukee (WI)
      - 444th Medical Detachment (Minimal Care), at Fort Snelling (MN)
      - 446th Medical Detachment (Hospital Augmentation, Medical 32 Bed), at Fort Snelling (MN)
      - 472nd Medical Detachment (Hospital Augmentation, Intermediate Care Ward 60 Bed), at Fort Snelling (MN)
      - 548th Medical Detachment (Hospital Augmentation, Surgical 24 Bed), in Milwaukee (WI)
      - 911th Medical Detachment Team (Forward Resuscitative and Surgical), in Madison (WI)
      - 945th Medical Detachment Team (Forward Resuscitative and Surgical), at Fort Snelling (MN)
    - 801st Field Hospital (32 Bed), at Fort Sheridan (IL)
      - Headquarters and Headquarters Detachment, at Fort Sheridan (IL)
      - 357th Medical Detachment Team (Forward Resuscitative and Surgical), at Fort Sheridan (IL)
      - 420th Medical Detachment (Hospital Augmentation, Medical 32 Bed), in Bartonville (IL)
      - 909th Medical Detachment Team (Forward Resuscitative and Surgical), at Fort Sheridan (IL)

== Lineage and Honors ==
=== Lineage ===
- Constituted 30 November 1944 in the Army of the United States as Headquarters, 30th Hospital Center
- Activated 30 December 1944 in the Philippine Islands
- Reorganized and redesignated 1 May 1945 as Headquarters and Headquarters Detachment, 30th Hospital Center
- Inactivated 25 January 1946 in the Philippine Islands
- Redesignated 26 May 1947 as Headquarters and Headquarters Detachment, 306th Hospital Center, and allotted to the Organized Reserves
- Activated 15 June 1947 at Atlanta, Georgia
- (Organized Reserves redesignated 25 March 1948 as the Organized Reserve Corps; redesignated 9 July 1952 as the Army Reserve)
- Redesignated 1 September 1949 as Headquarters, 306th Hospital Center
- Redesignated 31 January 1953 as Headquarters, 30th Hospital Center
- Inactivated 31 March 1963 at Atlanta, Georgia
- Activated 18 July 1969 at Chicago, Illinois
- Reorganized and redesignated 1 October 1975 as Headquarters and Headquarters Detachment, 30th Hospital Center
- Reorganized and redesignated 16 April 1993 as Headquarters and Headquarters Company, 330th Medical Brigade

=== Honors ===
==== Campaign Participation Credit ====
- World War II:
  - Leyte
  - Luzon

=== Decorations ===
- Philippine Republic Presidential Unit Citation, Streamer embroidered 17 OCTOBER 1944 - 4 JULY 1945

== Insignia ==
=== Shoulder Sleeve Insignia ===
Shoulder Sleeve Insignia, 330th Medical Brigade

==== Description ====
On a rectangle quartered scarlet and maroon arced at the top and bottom with a 1/8 inch (.32 cm) gold border, 2 inches (5.08 cm) in width and 3 inches (7.62 cm) in height overall, a white cross throughout bearing a gold torch entwined by a green serpent.

==== Symbolism ====
Maroon and white are the colors traditionally associated with the Medical Corps. Red suggests sacrifice and compassion. The four sections united by the cross symbolize teamwork and unity as well as highlighting the unit's medical mission. The torch, symbolizing leadership and knowledge, is entwined by a serpent, recalling the Staff of Aesculapius and underscoring healing and the medical arts.

==== Background ====
The shoulder sleeve insignia was approved on 6 October 1993. (TIOH Dwg. No. A-1-808)

=== Distinctive Unit Insignia ===
Distinctive Unit Insignia, 330th Medical Brigade

==== Description ====
A silver color metal and enamel device 1 3/16 inches (3.02 cm) in width overall, consisting of a cross quartered red (crimson) and maroon and centered in a silver disc encircled by a white ring within a blue ring surrounded by a continuous maroon scroll inscribed "TO LEAD AND MANAGE" in silver letters.

==== Symbolism ====
Maroon and white are colors traditionally associated with the Medical Corps. Blue refers to the location of the unit near Lake Michigan. Blue, white and red allude to the Presidential Unit Citation awarded the parent unit for service in the Pacific Theater during World War II. The cross, a traditional symbol of medicine, is divided scarlet and maroon equally, symbolizing mercy and mission.

==== Background ====
The distinctive unit insignia was originally approved for the 30th Hospital Center on 8 November 1979. It was redesignated for the 330th Medical Brigade, with the description and symbolism revised, on 6 October 1993.

=== Combat Service Identification Badge ===
==== Description ====
A silver color metal and enamel device 2 inches (5.08 cm) in height consisting of a design similar to the shoulder sleeve insignia.

== History ==
They hold a point-based competition each year to determine which among their ranks will win a non-commissioned officer position.

== Commanders ==
Image	Rank	Name	Branch	Begin date	End date	Notes
	Colonel					
	Colonel					
	Colonel					
		Inactive		26 January 1946	14 June 1947	
	Colonel					
	Colonel					
	Colonel					
	Colonel					
	Colonel					
	Colonel					
	Brigadier General	Joseph M. Bosworth	MC			In command in 1956, 1957, 1958
	Brigadier General					
	Brigadier General					
		Inactive		1 April 1963	17 July 1969	
	Brigadier General	Leo R. Weinschel	MC	17 July 1969	December 1972	
	Brigadier General					
	Brigadier General	J. Royston Brown	MC	28 February 1974	1 February 1976	
	Brigadier General	Roger H. Lehman	MC	1 February 1976	1980	
	Brigadier General	Kenneth J. Printen	MC			In command in 1983
	Brigadier General					
	Brigadier General					
	Brigadier General					
	Brigadier General					
	Brigadier General	Paul W. Gerster	MC	1985	April 1989	
	Brigadier General	Raymond C. Bonnabeau, Jr.	MC	April 1989	April 1990	Retired as a Major General.
	Colonel	Lipo, Robert	MC	April 1990	April 1991	
	Brigadier General	Dale F. Andres	MC	April 1991	15 April 1993	Commander, 30th Hospital Center.
	Brigadier General	Dale F. Andres	MC	16 April 1993	June 1995	Commander, 330th Medical Brigade.
	Brigadier General	Roger P. Hand	MC	June 1995	May 1997	
	Brigadier General	John W. Weiss	MC	May 1997	April 2002	Interim Commander May 1997 - April 1998
	Brigadier General	James A. Hasbargen	MC	April 2002	April 2006	Retired as a Major General.
	Colonel			April 2006	October 2006	
	Brigadier General	Jonathan Woodson	MC	October 2006	September 2009	Later served as Assistant Secretary of Defense for Health Affairs and President, Uniformed Services University of the Health Sciences.
	Colonel	Daniel J. Dire	MC	September 2009	October 2010	Listed as "Interim Commander." Retired as a Major General.
	Colonel			October 2010	October 2011	
	Colonel	William S. Lee	MC	January 2011	October 2012	Retired as a Major General.
	Colonel			October 2012	February 2013	
	Colonel	Christopher J. Demeunaere	SP	February 2013	June 2015	
	Colonel					
	Colonel					
	Colonel					
	Colonel	James Hill	MS		June 2000	
	Colonel	Christopher Piland	MS	June 2000	June 2022	
	Colonel	Robert D. Payne	MS	June 2022	June 2024	

== Historic organization ==
=== 1956 ===
- HHD, 30th Hospital Center, Atlanta, Georgia
- 158th General Hospital, Atlanta, Georgia
- 330th General Hospital, Memphis, Tennessee
- 396th General Hospital, Columbia, South Carolina
- 446th General Hospital, Augusta, Georgia
- 375th Station Hospital, Colombus, Georgia
- 382nd Station Hospital, Durham, North Carolina
- 812th Station Hospital, Jacksonville, Florida
