= 807th Theater Medical Command =

Theater-level medical command of the United States Army Reserve

- Shoulder sleeve insignia
- Active: 27 October 1944 – 27 October 1945; 22 February 1948 – 1 December 1950; 10 May 1956 – present
- Country: United States
- Branch: United States Army Reserve
- Type: Theater Medical Command
- Role: Health service support
- Size: Approx. 8,300 personnel; Five Medical Brigades, 142 deployable field medical units
- Part of: Army Reserve Medical Command
- Headquarters: Fort Douglas, Salt Lake City, Utah
- Motto: "Soldiers First"
- Colors: Maroon and White

Commanders
- Current commander: Maj. Gen. Michael L. Yost
- Command Sergeant Major: CSM Tully J. Culp

Insignia
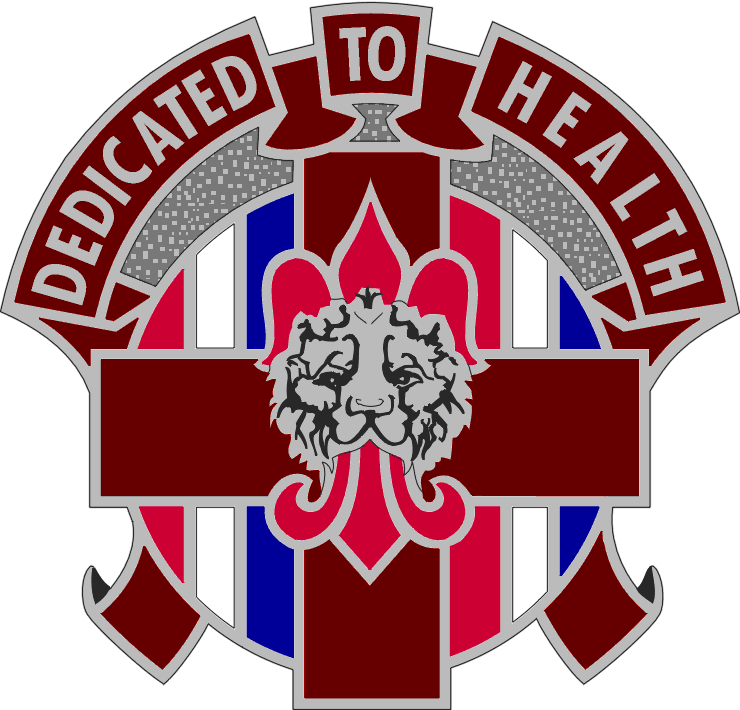
- Distinctive Unit Insignia

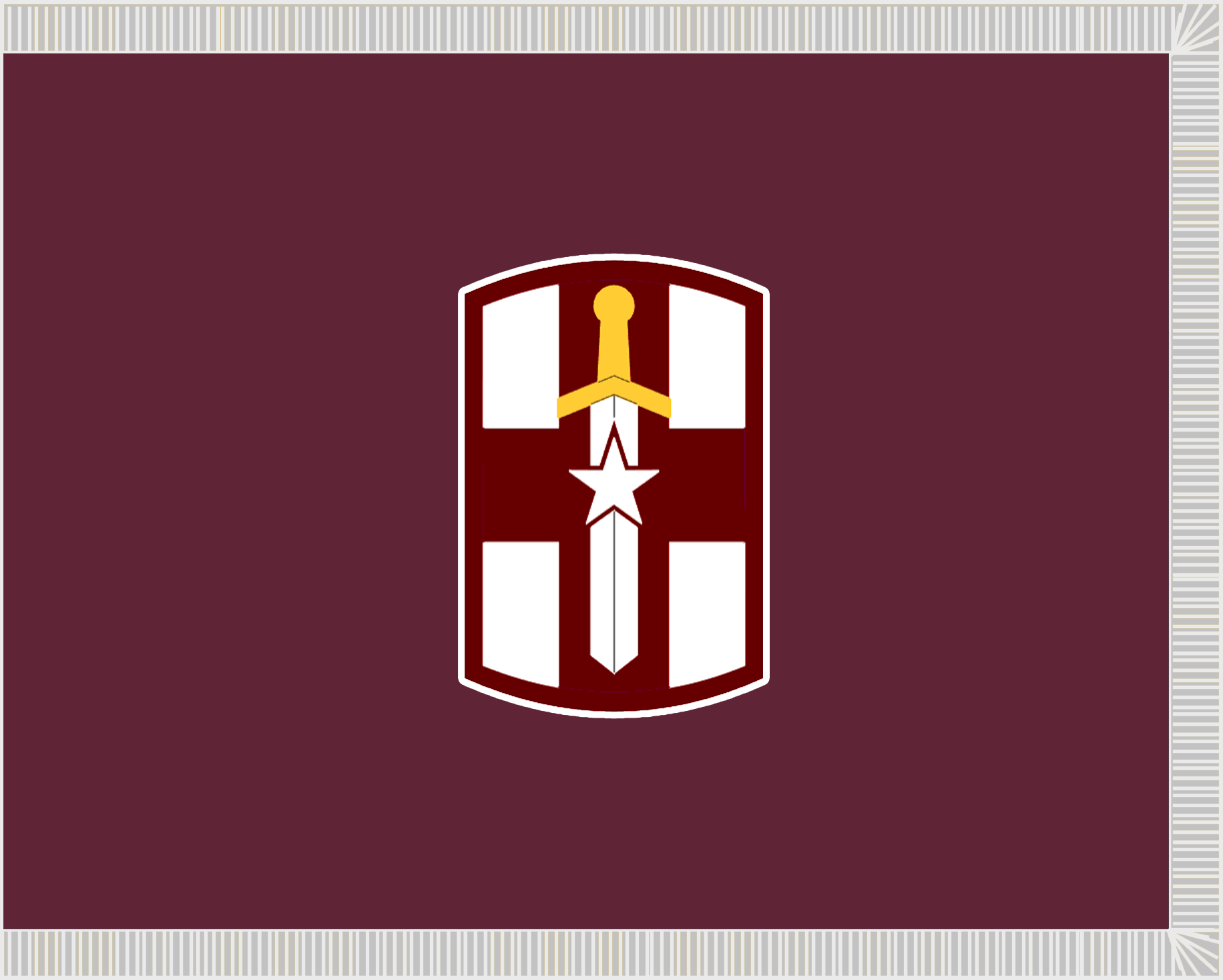
- 807th Medical Command Flag

The 807th Theater Medical Command (807 TMC), formerly the 807th Medical Command (Deployment Support) (MC(DS)), is headquartered at Fort Douglas in Salt Lake City, Utah. It manages all U.S. Army Reserve deployable field medical units west of the Mississippi River, comprising approximately 8,300 servicemembers across five Medical Brigades and 142 deployable field medical units from Ohio to California.

The command provides general, surgical, dental, ambulance, behavioral health, preventive medicine, and veterinary support to Army forces and civilian populations, delivering theater-level health service support under U.S. Southern Command. It also augments all other geographic combatant commands and routinely has elements of up to ten units and some 300 soldiers deployed worldwide. Its mission is to remain "operationally ready and responsive, capable of providing superior health service support and force health protection to the Joint Force in large-scale combat operations."

== Organization ==
The 807th Theater Medical Command is a subordinate functional command of the United States Army Reserve Command. The command oversees all operational reserve medical units west of the Mississippi River (except Louisiana). As of January 2026, the command consists of the following units:

- 807th Theater Medical Command, at Fort Douglas (UT)
  - Headquarters and Headquarters Company, 807th Theater Medical Command, at Fort Douglas (UT)
  - 807th Theater Medical Command Mission Support Element, at Camp Parks (CA)
  - Detachment 1, 807th Theater Medical Command, in St. Charles (MO)
  - 2nd Medical Brigade, at Camp Parks (CA)
    - 145th Medical Battalion (Multifunctional), in Garden Grove (CA)
    - 313th Hospital Center, in Vancouver (WA)
    - 820th Hospital Center, at Camp Parks (CA)
  - 139th Medical Brigade, in Independence (MO)
    - 388th Medical Battalion (Multifunctional), in Hays (KS)
    - 811th Hospital Center, in Independence (MO)
  - 176th Medical Brigade, in Seagoville (TX)
    - 341st Medical Battalion (Multifunctional), in Seagoville (TX)
    - 380th Hospital Center, in Bell (CA)
    - 805th Hospital Center, in Seagoville (TX)
  - 307th Medical Brigade, in Blacklick (OH)
    - 806th Hospital Center, in Twinsburg (OH)
  - 330th Medical Brigade, at Fort Sheridan (IL)
    - 172nd Medical Battalion (Multifunctional), in Ogden (UT)
    - 374th Hospital Center, at Fort Sheridan (IL)

== Lineage ==
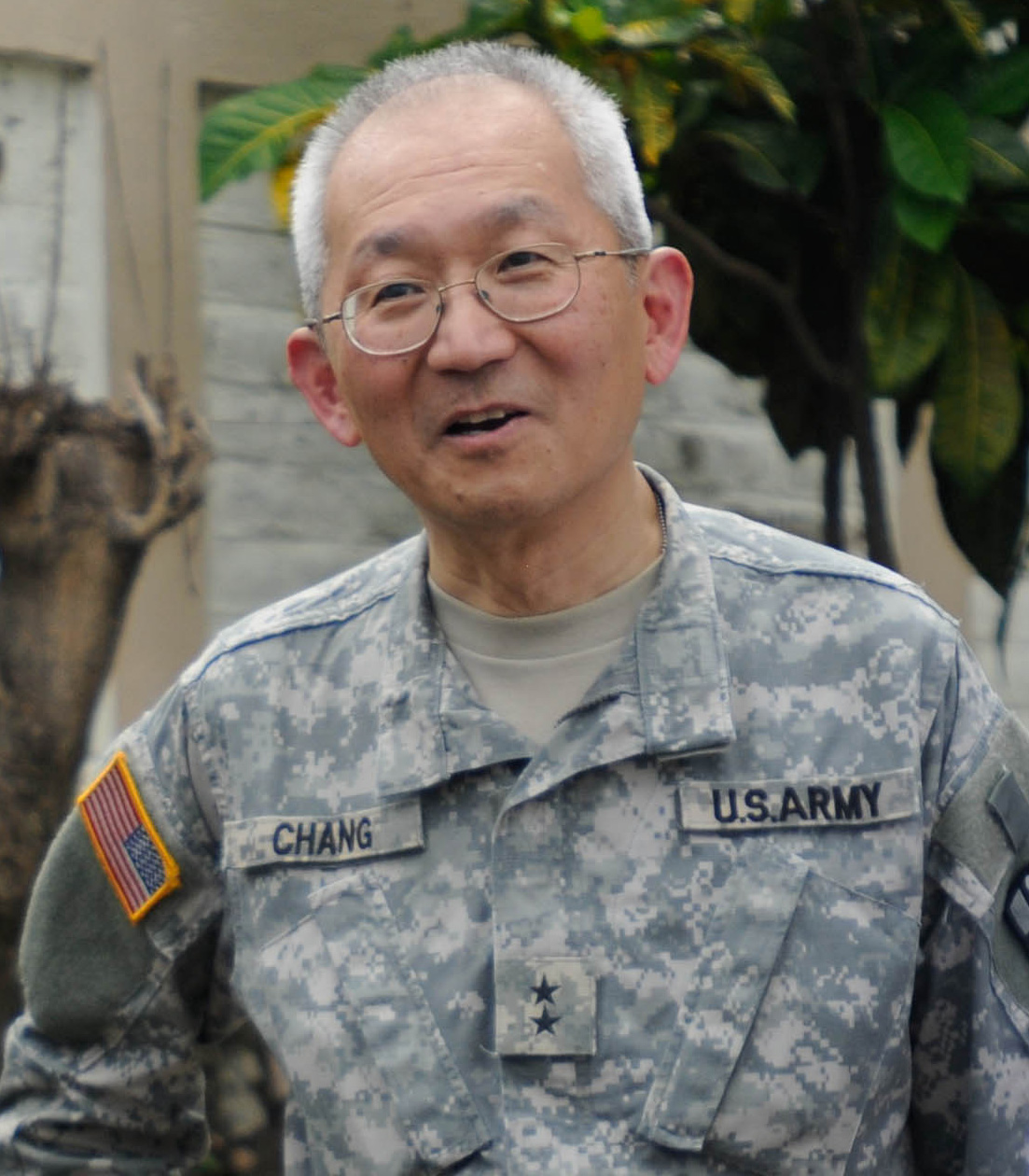
Major General Lie-Ping Chang, first commander after 2008 reactivation

- Constituted 27 October 1944 in the Army of the United States as the 807th Medical Service Detachment
- Activated 22 November 1944 in England
- Reorganized and redesignated 10 April 1945 as Headquarters and Headquarters Detachment, 807th Hospital Center
- Inactivated 27 October 1945 at Camp Sibert, Alabama
- Allotted 29 January 1948 to the Organized Reserves (redesignated Army Reserve 9 July 1952) and assigned to Fourth Army
- Activated 16 February 1948 at Oklahoma City, Oklahoma
- Reorganized and redesignated 29 August 1949 as Headquarters, 807th Hospital Center
- Inactivated 1 December 1950 at Oklahoma City, Oklahoma
- Activated 10 May 1956 at Galveston, Texas
- Relocated 1 January 1966 to Mesquite, Texas
- Relieved 30 June 1971 from Fourth Army and assigned to Fifth Army
- Reorganized and redesignated 1 October 1975 as Headquarters and Headquarters Detachment, 807th Hospital Center
- Reorganized and redesignated 30 June 1976 as Headquarters and Headquarters Detachment, 807th Medical Brigade
- Reorganized and redesignated 1 October 1976 as Headquarters and Headquarters Company, 807th Medical Brigade
- Relocated 13 April 1979 to Seagoville, Texas
- Reorganized and redesignated 16 September 2002 as Headquarters and Headquarters Company, 807th Medical Command
- Relocated 16 October 2008 to Fort Douglas, Utah
- Reorganized mid-2020s as Headquarters and Headquarters Company, 807th Theater Medical Command

== Unit insignia ==
=== Shoulder sleeve insignia (SSI) ===
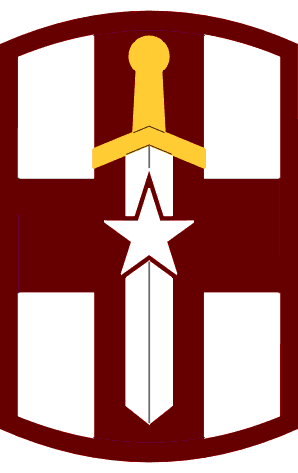
Shoulder sleeve insignia of the 807th Theater Medical Command

Description
Shield 2 in (5.1 cm) wide and 3 in (7.6 cm) high overall, white field bearing a maroon cross extending to the edges; centered a white sword charged at the hilt with a maroon-edged white star; all within a 1/8 in (0.32 cm) maroon border.

Symbolism
Maroon and white are AMEDD colors; the cross and sword denote medical support in combat; the star alludes to the unit's Utah heritage.

Background
Approved 21 December 1976 for the 807th Medical Brigade; redesignated 17 September 2002 for the 807th Medical Command (Deployment Support). Remains unchanged under TMC.

=== Distinctive unit insignia (DUI) ===
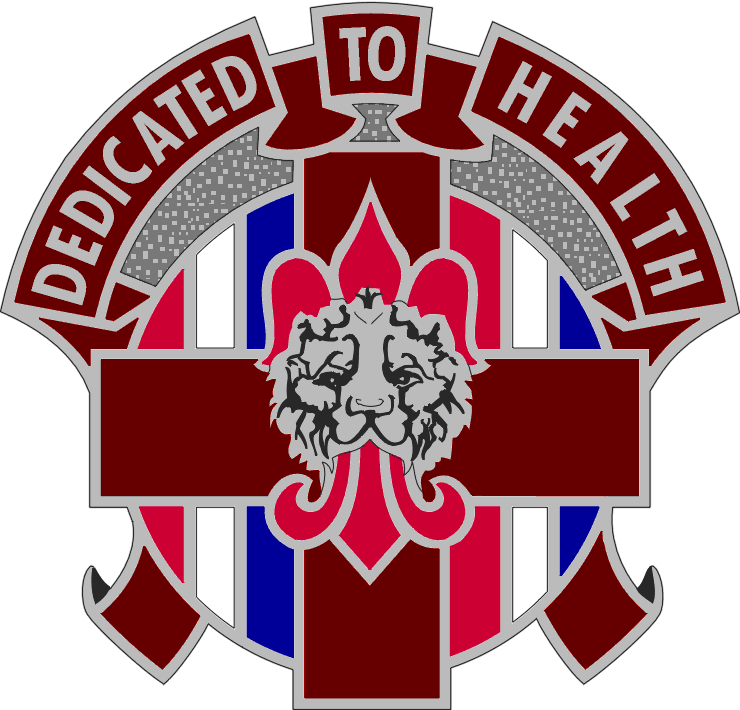
Distinctive unit insignia of the 807th Theater Medical Command

Description
Silver metal and enamel device 1 1/8 in (29 mm) high, maroon Greek cross bearing a silver lion's face and red fleur-de-lis on a red-white-blue disc, surmounted by a maroon scroll inscribed "DEDICATED TO HEALTH."

Symbolism
Maroon and white = AMEDD; cross = aid; lion's face = England; fleur-de-lis = France; tricolor disc = national colors and geographic alignment.

Background
Approved 25 March 1977 for the 807th Medical Brigade; redesignated 17 September 2002 for MC(DS). Remains in use for TMC.

=== Gallery ===
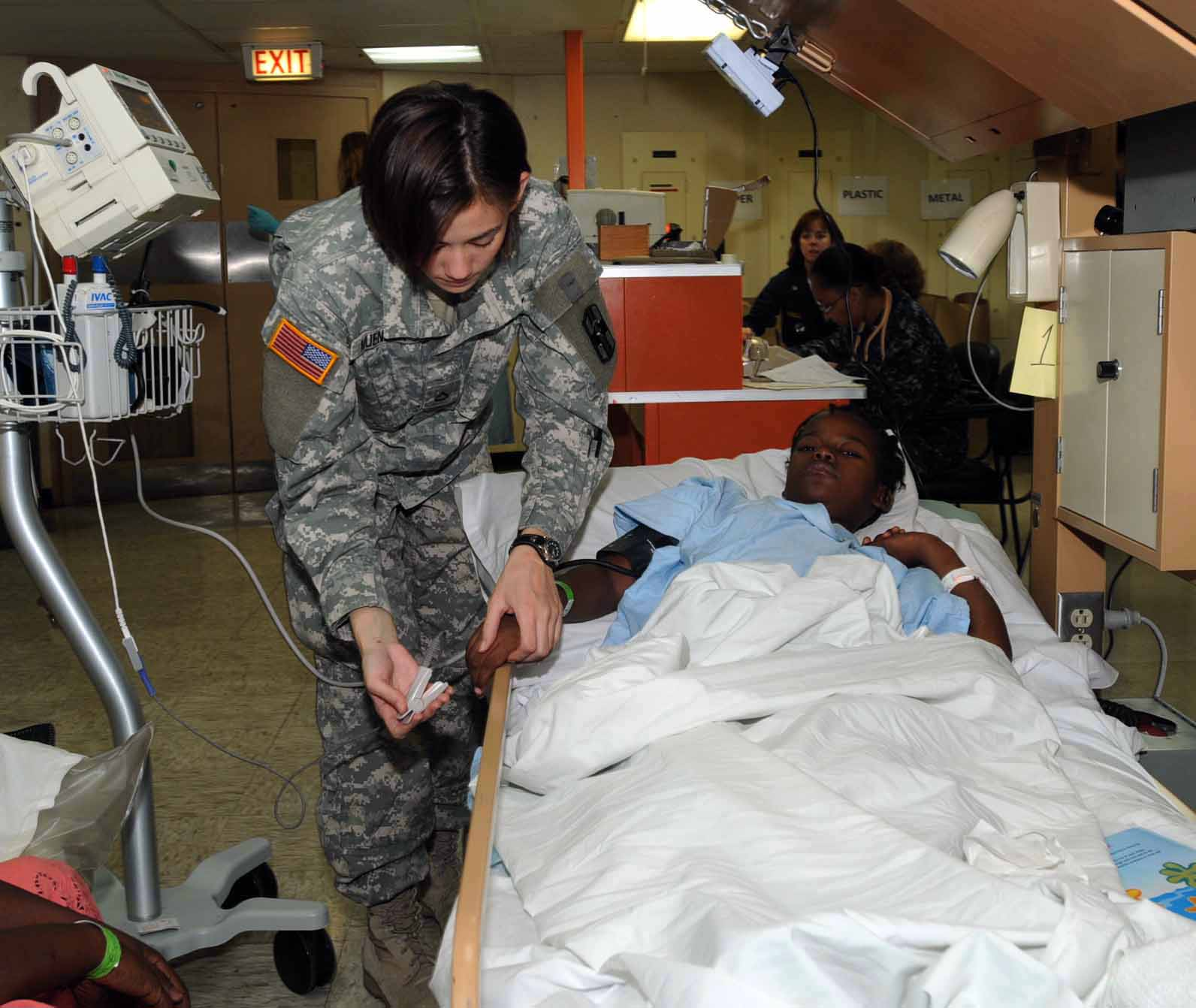
PFC Muenzer checks on a Haitian girl following surgery, Haiti (2010)

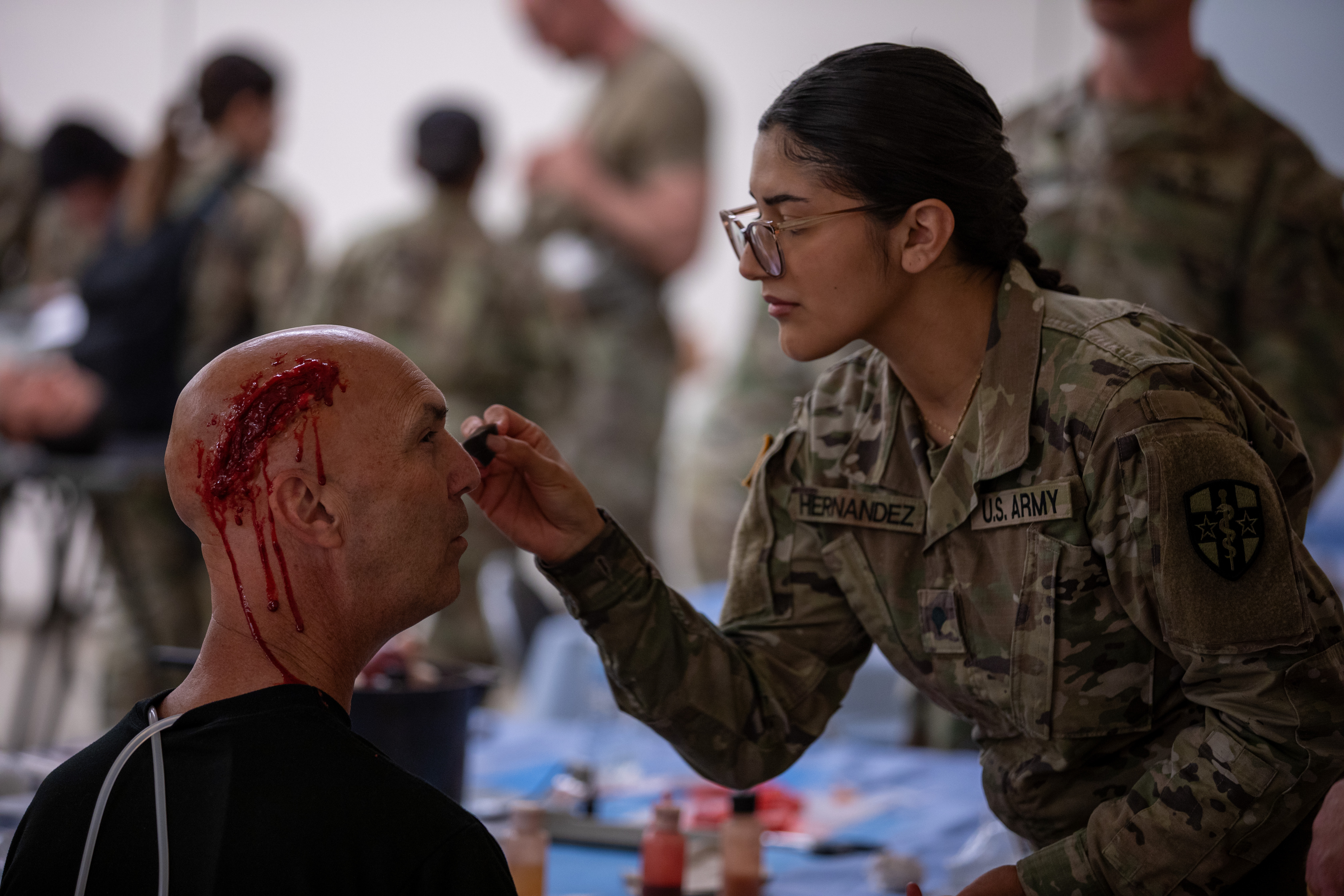
Brig Gen Todd Traver goes hands-on as notional casualty during medical unit visits, Fort Hunter Liggett, California (5 June 2025)

=== Unit honors ===
Unit awards
Ribbon	Award	Period	Recipient	Notes
	Meritorious Unit Commendation (Army)	2010 – 2011	Detachment 1, Headquarters and Headquarters Company, 807th Medical Command (Deployment Support)	For service in Iraq

=== Commanding Generals ===
Commanders of the 807th Theater Medical Command
#	Commander	From	To	Notable service
1	Major General Lie-Ping Chang (張立平)	16 October 2008	March 2012	Oversaw stand-up as MC(DS)
2	Major General Craig A. Bugno	April 2012	June 2015	
3	Major General Daniel J. Dire	June 2015	July 2018	
4	Major General Michael C. O'Guinn	July 2018	May 2019	Selected as Deputy Chief of Army Reserve
5	Major General Joseph J. Heck	May 2019	October 2021	Oversaw COVID-19 UAMTF mobilizations; later Deputy Surgeon General for Mobilization and Readiness
6	Major General Tracy L. Smith	October 2021	July 2023	First woman to command the 807th
7	Major General Beth A. Salisbury	July 2023	Incumbent	First MG from the Army Medical Specialist Corps
