= 307 (disambiguation) =

307 is a year in the common era (AD or CE)

307 may also refer to:

- 307 BC
- 307 (number)
- Peugeot 307, an automobile
- British Rail Class 307 locomotive
- Boeing 307 Stratoliner airliner
- Oldsmobile 307, an engine
- 307 Nike, an asteroid
- .307 Winchester Cartridge
- Area code 307
- HTTP 307, status code for Temporary Redirect

== See also ==
- 307th (disambiguation)
