= 2nd Medical Brigade =

- Shoulder sleeve insignia
- Active: 1976-Present
- Country: United States
- Allegiance: United States Army
- Type: Medical brigade
- Size: Brigade
- Part of: 807th Theater Medical Command
- Garrison/HQ: Dublin, California
- Colors: Maroon and White

Insignia
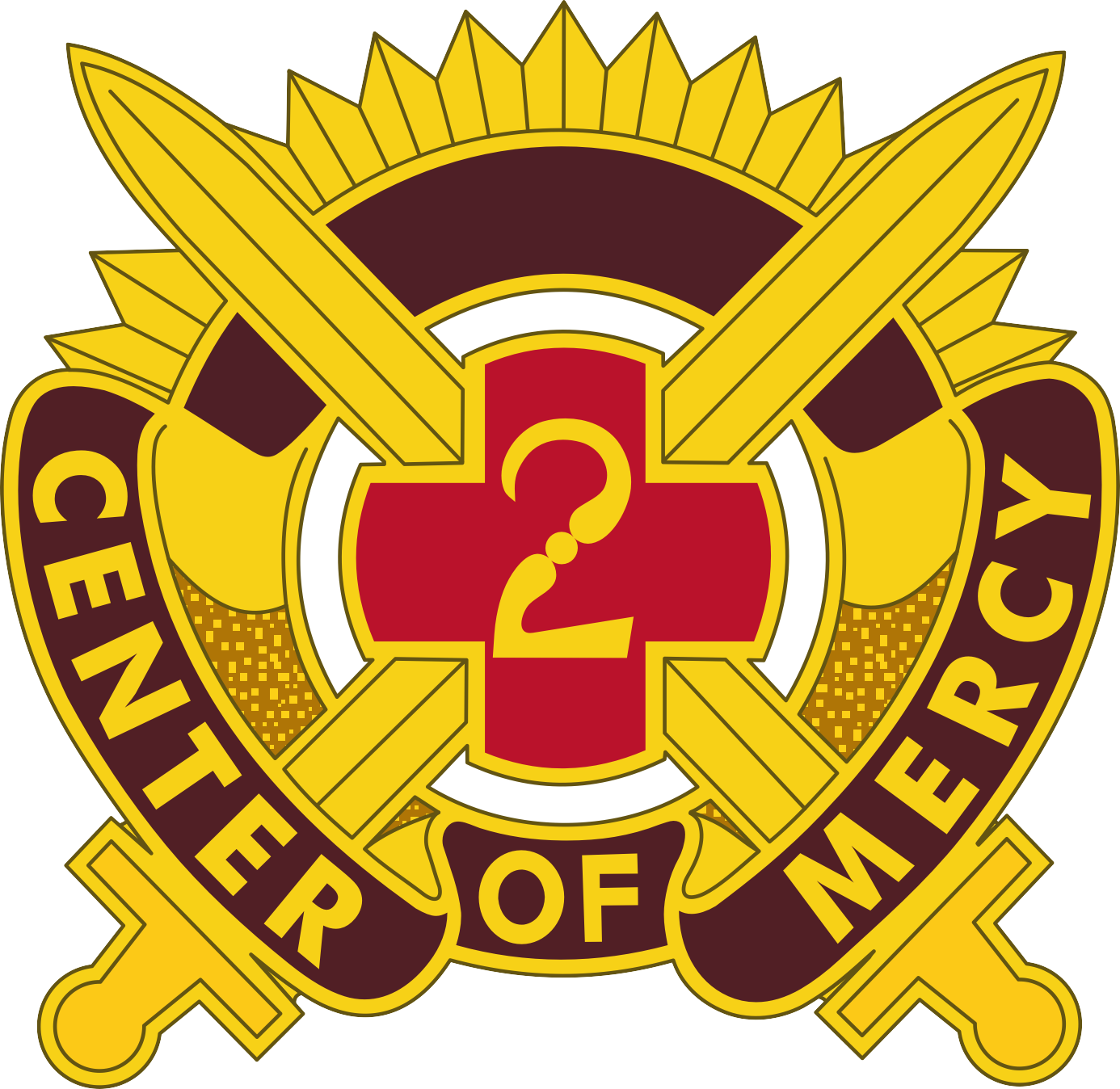
- Distinctive unit insignia

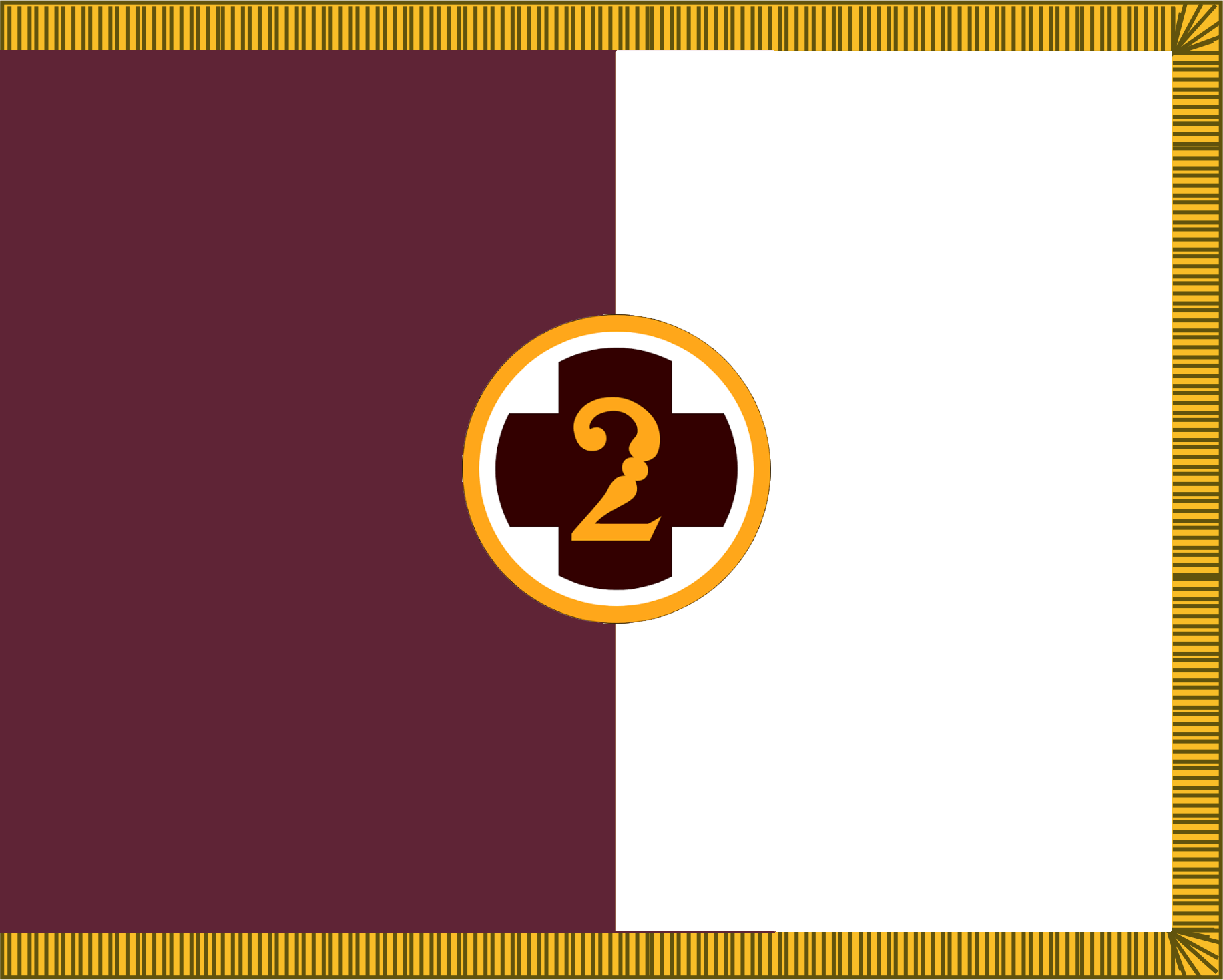
- 2nd Medical Brigade Flag

The 2nd Medical Brigade is a medical brigade of the United States Army Reserve subordinate to the 807th Medical Command (Deployment Support) and headquartered in Dublin, California.

== Current organization ==
The 2nd Medical Brigade is a subordinate unit of the 807th Theater Medical Command. As of January 2026 the brigade consists of the following units:

- 2nd Medical Brigade, at Camp Parks (CA)
  - Headquarters and Headquarters Company, 2nd Medical Brigade, at Camp Parks (CA)
  - 185th Dental Company (Area Support), in Garden Grove (CA)
    - Detachment 1, 185th Dental Company (Area Support), at Camp Parks (CA)
  - 145th Medical Battalion (Multifunctional), in Garden Grove (CA)
    - Headquarters and Headquarters Detachment, in Garden Grove (CA)
    - 109th Medical Detachment (Veterinary Services), in Garden Grove (CA)
    - 113th Medical Detachment (Combat and Operational Stress Control — COSC), in Garden Grove (CA)
    - 149th Medical Detachment (Veterinary Services), at Joint Base Lewis–McChord (WA)
    - 200th Medical Detachment (Preventive Medicine), at Fort Douglas (UT)
    - 308th Medical Company (Logistics), in St. George (UT)
    - 362nd Medical Company (Logistics), in Sacramento (CA)
    - 437th Medical Company (Ground Ambulance), at March Air Reserve Base (CA)
    - 791st Medical Detachment (Preventive Medicine), in Garden Grove (CA)
    - 872nd Medical Company (Ground Ambulance), in Sacramento (CA)
    - 898th Medical Detachment (Preventive Medicine), at Joint Base Lewis–McChord (WA)
    - 971st Medical Company (Logistics), in Ogden (UT)
    - 981st Medical Detachment (Preventive Medicine), at Fairchild Air Force Base (WA)
    - 987th Medical Detachment (Blood Support), in Ogden (UT)
    - 1848th Medical Detachment (Preventive Medicine), at Joint Base Lewis–McChord (WA)
    - 1972nd Medical Detachment (Combat and Operational Stress Control — COSC), at Joint Base Lewis–McChord (WA)
  - 313th Hospital Center, in Vancouver (WA)
    - Headquarters and Headquarters Detachment, in Vancouver (WA)
    - 385th Field Hospital (32 Bed), at Fairchild Air Force Base (WA)
      - Headquarters and Headquarters Detachment, at Fairchild Air Force Base (WA)
      - 348th Medical Detachment (Hospital Augmentation, Intermediate Care Ward 60 Bed), at Fairchild Air Force Base (WA)
      - 852nd Medical Detachment (Hospital Augmentation, Medical 32 Bed), at Fairchild Air Force Base (WA)
    - 396th Field Hospital (32 Bed), in Vancouver (WA)
      - Headquarters and Headquarters Detachment, in Vancouver (WA)
      - 355th Medical Detachment (Hospital Augmentation, Medical 32 Bed), at Joint Base Lewis–McChord (WA)
      - 367th Medical Detachment Team (Forward Resuscitative and Surgical), in Vancouver (WA)
      - 492nd Medical Detachment (Hospital Augmentation, Surgical 24 Bed), in Vancouver (WA)
      - 915th Medical Detachment Team (Forward Resuscitative and Surgical), in Vancouver (WA)
      - 1888th Medical Detachment Team (Hospital Augmentation, Head and Neck), at Joint Base Lewis–McChord (WA)
  - 820th Hospital Center, at Camp Parks (CA)
    - Headquarters and Headquarters Detachment, at Camp Parks (CA)
    - 328th Field Hospital (32 Bed), at Fort Douglas (UT)
      - Headquarters and Headquarters Detachment, at Fort Douglas (UT)
      - 934th Medical Detachment Team (Forward Resuscitative and Surgical), at Fort Douglas (UT)
    - 352nd Field Hospital (32 Bed), at Camp Parks (CA)
      - Headquarters and Headquarters Detachment, at Camp Parks (CA)
      - 107th Medical Detachment (Hospital Augmentation, Intermediate Care Ward 60 Bed), in Sacramento (CA)
      - 114th Medical Detachment (Minimal Care), in Fresno (CA)
      - 321st Medical Detachment (Hospital Augmentation, Intermediate Care Ward 60 Bed), in Sacramento (CA)
      - 1488th Medical Detachment (Hospital Augmentation, Medical 32 Bed), at Camp Parks (CA)
      - 1895th Medical Detachment Team (Hospital Augmentation, Head and Neck), in Fresno (CA)
      - 1933rd Medical Detachment (Hospital Augmentation, Surgical 24 Bed), in Sacramento (CA)
      - 1980th Medical Detachment Team (Forward Resuscitative and Surgical), in Fresno (CA)

== Lineage and Honors ==
=== Lineage ===
- Constituted 1 March 1976 in the Army Reserve as Headquarters and Headquarters Detachment, 2d Hospital Center
- Activated 15 April 1976 at Hamilton Air Force Base, California
- Reorganized and redesignated 17 September 1992 as Headquarters and Headquarters Company, 2d Medical Brigade
- Location changed 1 December 1993 to San Pablo, California

=== Honors ===
==== Campaign Participation Credit ====
- Iraq
  - Transition of Iraq
  - Iraqi Governance

=== Decorations ===
- Meritorious Unit Citation (Army), streamer embroidered IRAQ 2004

== Insignia ==
=== Shoulder Sleeve Insignia ===
Shoulder Sleeve Insignia, 2nd Medical Brigade

==== Description ====
On a white disc with a 1/8 inch (.32 cm) gold border 2 1/4 inches (5.72 cm) in diameter overall, a maroon cross with the arms rounded at the ends bearing an inverted gold fleam

==== Symbolism ====
Maroon and white are the colors traditionally associated with the Medical Corps. The cross alludes to medical care and service while the inverted fleam, an ancient surgical implement, simulates the numeral "2," representing the unit's numerical designation. Gold is for honor and excellence.

==== Background ====
The shoulder sleeve insignia was approved on 20 October 1992. (TIOH Dwg. No. A-1-801)

=== Distinctive Unit Insignia ===
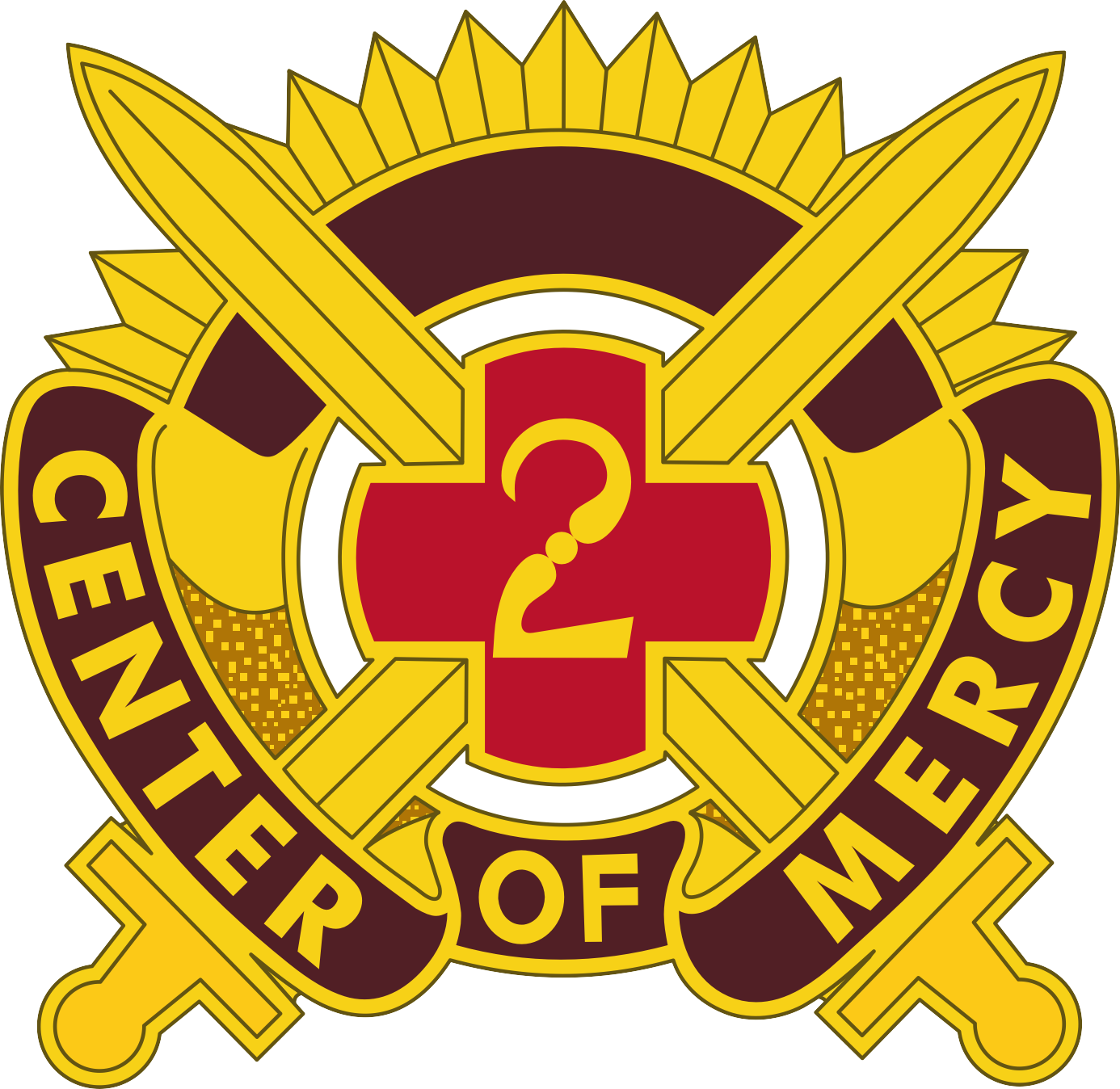
Distinctive Unit Insignia, 2nd Medical Brigade

==== Description ====
A gold color metal and enamel device 1 1/8 inches (2.86 cm) in width overall consisting of an inverted gold fleam on a red cross with equal length arms rounded at the ends surmounting the junction of two gold swords saltirewise all centered on a white disc which is surrounded by a continuous maroon scroll folded inward at either side issuing gold rays from the upper arch behind the swordpoint; the scroll folded three times in base and crossing in front of the swords above the hilt and bearing in gold letters "CENTER OF MERCY" on the left, center and right hand segments respectively.

==== Symbolism ====
Maroon and white are colors traditionally associated with the Medical Department. The fleam, an ancient medical scalpel, resembles the numeral two and is centered on a red cross, a traditional symbol for medical services, and represents the unit's primary mission. The crossed swords allude to the soldier and to the two components supported by the unit. The white disc refers to hope. The sun rays refer to a setting sun alluding to the western United States where the unit is located.

==== Background ====
The distinctive unit insignia was originally approved for the 2d Hospital Center on 31 August 1979. It was redesignated for the 2d Medical Brigade with the description and symbolism revised on 20 October 1992.

=== Combat Service Identification Badge ===
==== Description/Blazon ====
A gold color metal and enamel device 2 inches (5.08 cm) in diameter consisting of a design similar to the shoulder sleeve insignia.

== History ==
The 2nd Hospital Center was activated on 15 April 1976 to fill a void created with the inactivation of the XV Corps, to provide a command and control headquarters for hospitals on the west coast of the United States.

The mission of a hospital center was to provide command and control of two or more geographically co-located general hospitals located in the Communications Zone, and the 2nd Hospital Center was assigned two general hospitals, although one, the 6253rd USAH, was a 1,000 bed TDA expansion hospital designed to expand an existing CONUS-based medical treatment facility.

== Commanders ==
Image	Rank	Name	Branch	Begin date	End date	Notes
	Brigadier General	Jack Jew	MC	1 March 1976		Previously commanded the 6253d US Army Hospital (1,000 Bed)
	Brigadier General	Theodore R. Sadler, Jr.		1982		
	Brigadier General	James R. Sims, Jr.	MC	January 1982		
	Brigadier General		MC			
	Brigadier General	Roger H. Butz	MC			1988
	Brigadier General					
	Brigadier General	Richard D. Lynch	MC	May 1995	May 1998	Came from command of 176th Medical Group, departed to command 332nd Medical Brigade
	Brigadier General					
	Brigadier General					
	Brigadier General	James F. Reynolds	MC	June 2002	June 2006	Deployed the brigade to Iraq in 2004
	Brigadier General	Craig A. Bugno	MC	September 2006	September 2009	Retired as a Major General
	Colonel	Otis Blueitt	MS	September 2009	2012	
	Colonel	Robert F. Reeder	MS	2012	May 2015	
	Colonel	Robert E. Suter	MC	May 2015	May 2016	
	Colonel					
	Colonel					
	Colonel	Kathleen A. Clary	AN	March 2020	October 2021	
	Colonel					

== Historic organization ==
=== July 1976 ===
- HHD, 2nd Hospital Center, Hamilton Field, Novato, California
- 6253rd US Army Hospital (1,000 Bed), Hamilton Field, Novato, California
- 347th General Hospital, Sunnyvale, California
- 352nd Evacuation Hospital, Oakland, California
- US Army Advisor Group, Hamilton Field, Novato, California

=== Iraq, 2004 ===
- HHC, 2nd Medical Brigade
- 31st Combat Support Hospital
- 67th Combat Support Hospital
- 118th Medical Battalion
- 226th Medical Battalion
- 429th Medical Battalion
- Navy Forward Deployed Preventive Medicine Unit - East
- Navy Forward Deployed Preventive Medicine Unit - West
