= 139 =

139 may refer to:

- 139 (number), the natural number following 138 and preceding 140
- AD 139, a year of the Julian calendar
- 139 BC, a year of the pre-Julian Roman calendar
- 139 (New Jersey bus)
- 139 Juewa, a main-belt asteroid

== See also ==
- 139th (disambiguation)
