= 307th Regiment =

307th Regiment may refer to:

- 307th Cavalry Regiment, United States
- 307th Infantry Regiment, United States
- 307th (South Nottinghamshire Hussars Yeomanry) Field Regiment, Royal Artillery

== See also ==
- 307th (disambiguation)
