= 139th Medical Brigade =

- Shoulder Sleeve Insignia
- Country: United States
- Branch: United States Army Reserve
- Type: Medical
- Size: Brigade
- Part of: 807th Theater Medical Command
- Reserve Center: Independence, Missouri
- Mottos: ”Valor and Worth”
- Medical Corps Colors: Maroon and White

Insignia
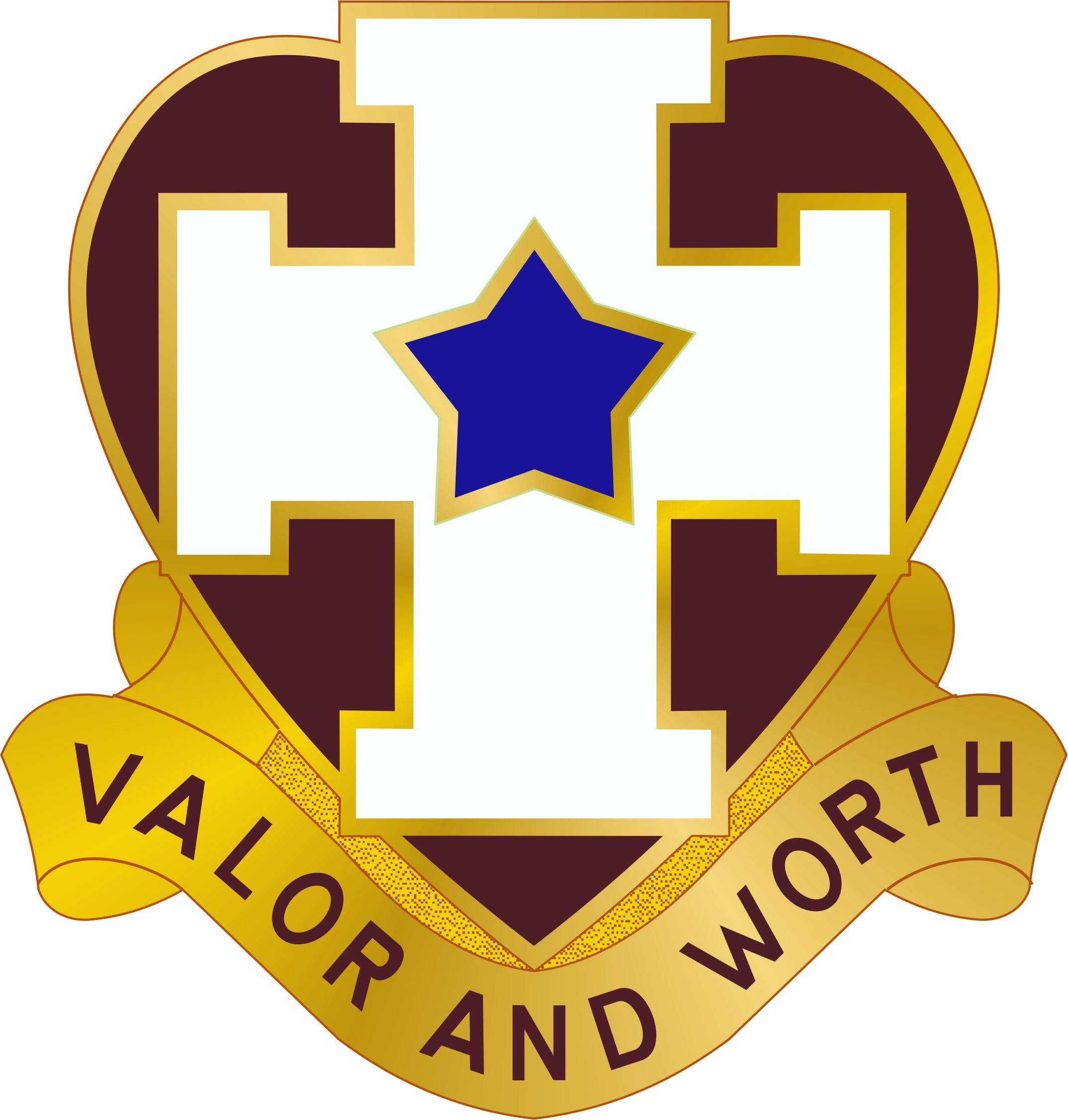
- Distinctive Unit Insignia

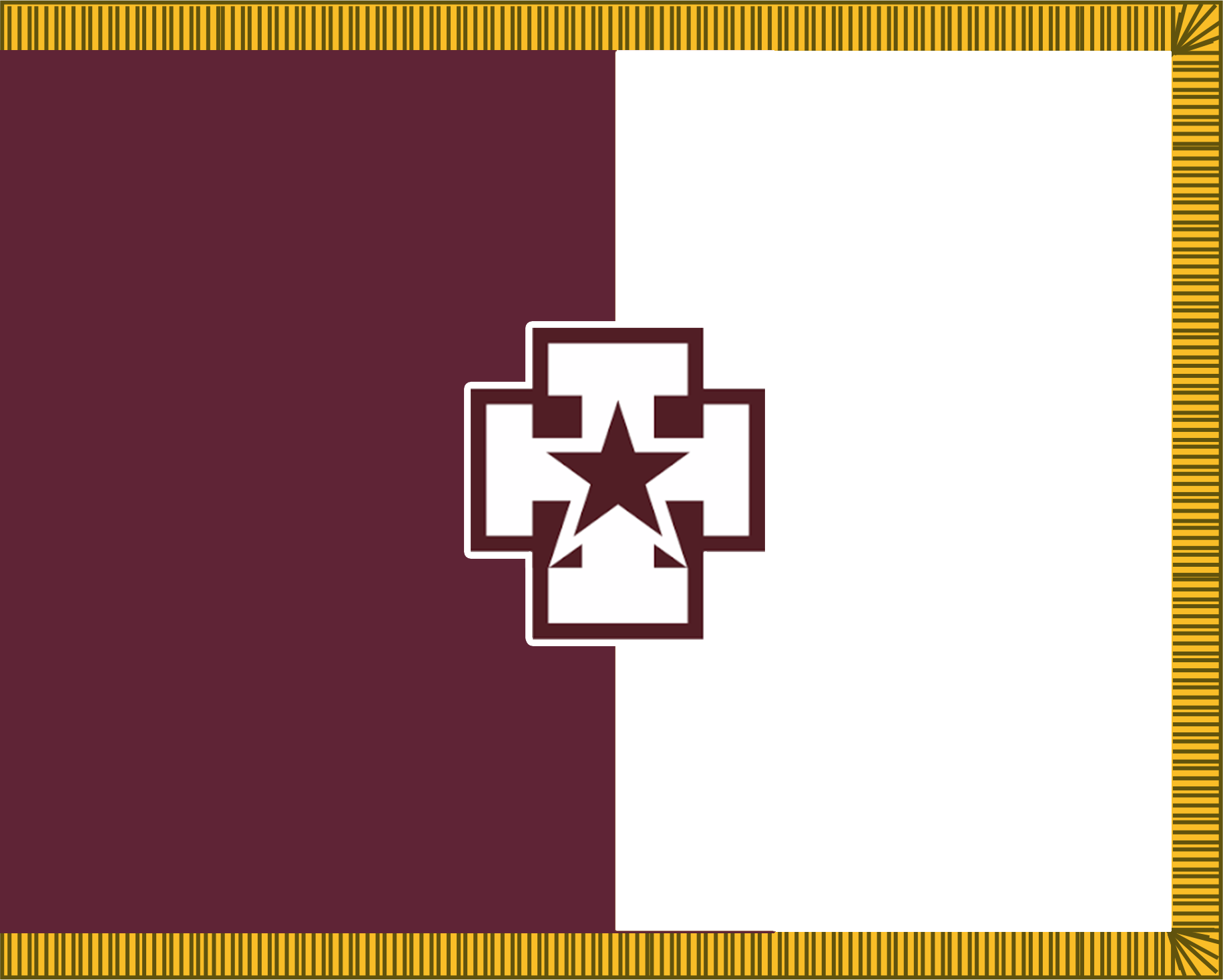
- 139th Medical Brigade Flag

The 139th Medical Brigade, a subordinate command of the 807th Medical Command (Deployment Support), is headquartered in Independence, MO.

== Organization ==
The 139th Medical Brigade is a subordinate unit of the 807th Theater Medical Command. As of January 2026 the brigade consists of the following units:

- 139th Medical Brigade, in Independence (MO)
  - Headquarters and Headquarters Company, 139th Medical Brigade, in Independence (MO)
  - 143rd Dental Company (Area Support), at Fort Douglas (UT)
    - Detachment 1, 143rd Dental Company (Area Support), in Aurora (CO)
  - 388th Medical Battalion (Multifunctional), in Hays (KS)
    - Headquarters and Headquarters Detachment, in Hays (KS)
    - 332nd Medical Company (Logistics), in St. Charles (MO)
    - 391st Medical Company (Logistics), in Hays (KS)
    - 392nd Medical Company (Logistics), in Wichita (KS)
    - 445th Medical Detachment (Veterinary Services), in Independence (MO)
    - 469th Medical Company (Ground Ambulance), in Wichita (KS)
    - 480th Medical Detachment (Preventive Medicine), in Columbia (MO)
    - 793rd Medical Detachment (Preventive Medicine), in Aurora (CO)
    - 919th Medical Company (Ground Ambulance), in Aurora (CO)
    - 993rd Medical Detachment (Veterinary Services), in Aurora (CO)
    - 1835th Medical Detachment (Combat and Operational Stress Control — COSC), in Aurora (CO)
    - 1863rd Medical Detachment (Preventive Medicine), in Columbia (MO)
    - 1900th Medical Detachment (Preventive Medicine), in Springfield (MO)
    - 1908th Medical Detachment (Combat and Operational Stress Control — COSC), in Topeka (KS)
  - 811th Hospital Center, in Independence (MO)
    - Headquarters and Headquarters Detachment, in Independence (MO)
    - 303rd Field Hospital (32 Bed), in St. Charles (MO)
      - Headquarters and Headquarters Detachment, in St. Charles (MO)
      - 141st Medical Detachment (Hospital Augmentation, Medical 32 Bed), in Springfield (MO)
      - 339th Medical Detachment (Hospital Augmentation, Intermediate Care Ward 60 Bed), in St. Charles (MO)
      - 904th Medical Detachment (Hospital Augmentation, Surgical 24 Bed), in Springfield (MO)
      - 1487th Medical Detachment Team (Hospital Augmentation, Head and Neck), in St. Charles (MO)
    - 325th Field Hospital (32 Bed), in Independence (MO)
      - Headquarters and Headquarters Detachment, in Independence (MO)
      - 305th Medical Detachment (Minimal Care), in Joplin (MO)
      - 486th Medical Detachment (Hospital Augmentation, Intermediate Care Ward 60 Bed), in Independence (MO)
      - 1998th Medical Detachment Team (Hospital Augmentation, Head and Neck), in Independence (MO)
