= 176th Medical Brigade =

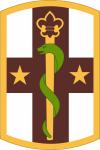
- Shoulder sleeve insignia
- Country: United States
- Branch: United States Army Reserve
- Type: Medical brigade
- Size: Brigade
- Part of: 807th Medical Command
- Garrison/HQ: Seagoville, Texas
- Motto: To Serve Proudly
- Colors: Maroon and White

Insignia
- Distinctive unit insignia

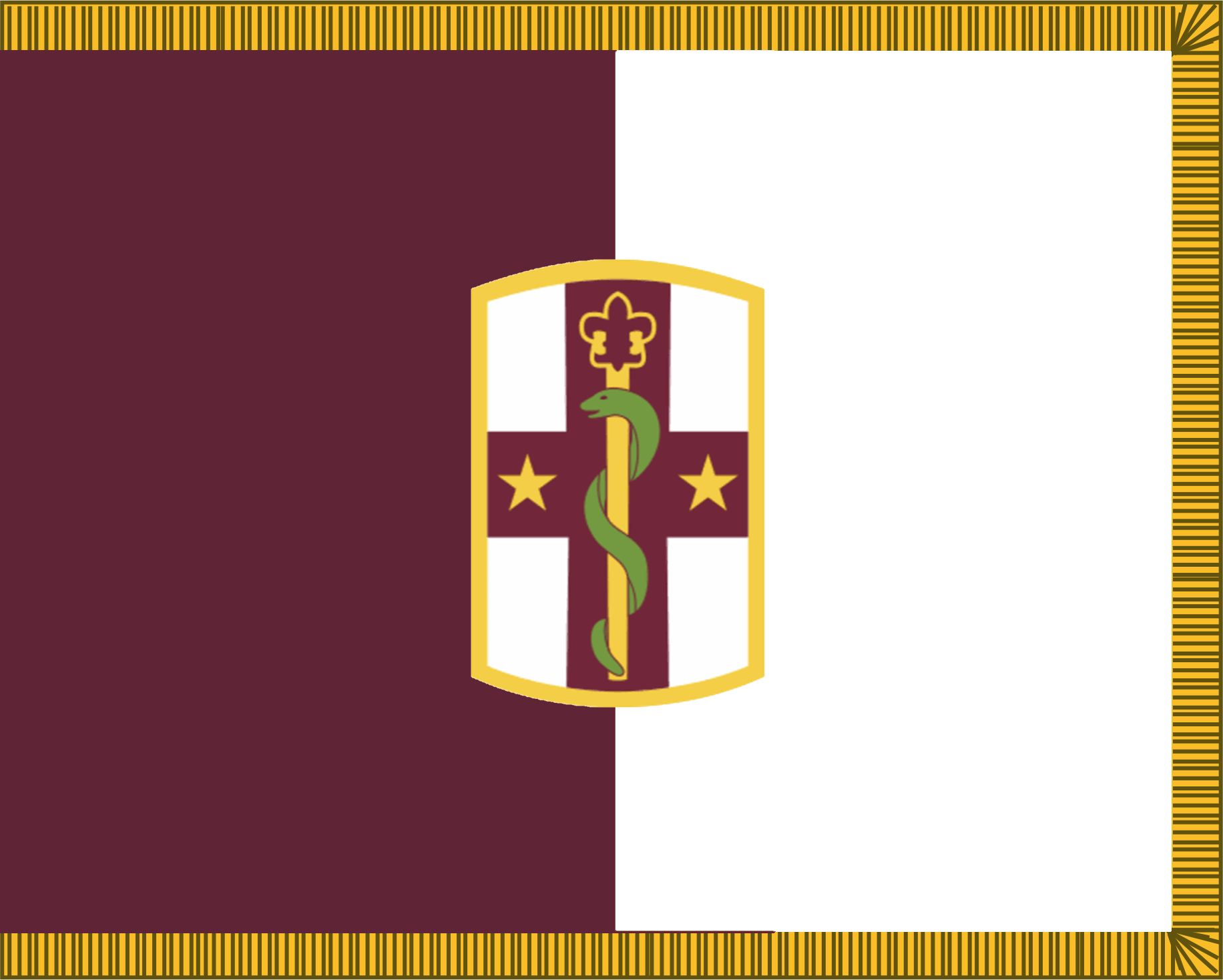
- 176th Medical Brigade Flag

The 176th Medical Brigade is a medical brigade of the United States Army Reserve subordinate to the 807th Medical Command and headquartered in Seagoville, Texas.

== Current organization ==
The 176th Medical Brigade is a subordinate unit of the 807th Theater Medical Command. As of January 2026 the brigade consists of the following units:

- 176th Medical Brigade, in Seagoville (TX)
  - Headquarters and Headquarters Company, 176th Medical Brigade, in Seagoville (TX)
  - 965th Dental Company (Area Support), in Seagoville (TX)
  - 341st Medical Battalion (Multifunctional), in Seagoville (TX)
    - Headquarters and Headquarters Detachment, in Seagoville (TX)
    - 312th Medical Company (Logistics), in Seagoville (TX)
    - 329th Medical Detachment (Blood Support), in Seagoville (TX)
    - 354th Medical Company (Logistics), in Seagoville (TX)
    - 368th Medical Detachment (Combat and Operational Stress Control — COSC), in Tulsa (OK)
    - 441st Medical Company (Ground Ambulance), in Seagoville (TX)
    - 491st Medical Company (Area Support), in Santa Fe (NM)
    - 792nd Medical Detachment (Preventive Medicine), in Lubbock (TX)
    - 988th Medical Detachment (Preventive Medicine), in Round Rock (TX)
    - 994th Medical Detachment (Veterinary Services), in Round Rock (TX)
  - 380th Hospital Center, in Bell (CA)
    - Headquarters and Headquarters Detachment, in Bell (CA)
    - 349th Field Hospital (32 Bed), in Bell (CA)
      - Headquarters and Headquarters Detachment, in Bell (CA)
      - 144th Medical Detachment (Minimal Care), in San Diego (CA)
      - 272nd Medical Detachment (Hospital Augmentation, Surgical 24 Bed), in Bell (CA)
      - 324th Medical Detachment (Hospital Augmentation, Intermediate Care Ward 60 Bed), in Bell (CA)
    - 921st Field Hospital (32 Bed), in Bell (CA)
      - Headquarters and Headquarters Detachment, in Bell (CA)
      - 403rd Medical Detachment (Hospital Augmentation, Intermediate Care Ward 60 Bed), in Bell (CA)
      - 425th Medical Detachment (Hospital Augmentation, Medical 32 Bed), in Bell (CA)
      - 1872nd Medical Detachment Team (Hospital Augmentation, Head and Neck), in Garden Grove (CA)
  - 805th Hospital Center, in Seagoville (TX)
    - Headquarters and Headquarters Detachment, in Seagoville (TX)
    - 228th Field Hospital (32 Bed), at Camp Bullis (TX)
      - Headquarters and Headquarters Detachment, at Camp Bullis (TX)
      - 273rd Medical Detachment (Hospital Augmentation, Intermediate Care Ward 60 Bed), at Joint Base San Antonio (TX)
      - 340th Medical Detachment (Hospital Augmentation, Medical 32 Bed), at Joint Base San Antonio (TX)
      - 628th Medical Detachment Team (Forward Resuscitative and Surgical), at Joint Base San Antonio (TX)
    - 394th Field Hospital (32 Bed), in Seagoville (TX)
      - Headquarters and Headquarters Detachment, in Seagoville (TX)
      - 374th Medical Detachment (Hospital Augmentation, Medical 32 Bed), at Camp Robinson (AR)
      - 1979th Medical Detachment (Hospital Augmentation, Surgical 24 Bed), at Camp Robinson (AR)

== Lineage and honors ==
=== Lineage ===
- Constituted
- Activated 15 September 1943 at Camp Forrest, Tennessee as Headquarters and Headquarters Detachment, 176th Medical Battalion
- Inactivated XXX 1945
- (Organized Reserves redesignated Organized Reserve Corps, 25 March 1948)
- (Organized Reserve Corps redesignated Army Reserve, 9 July 1952)
- Redesignated XXX as Headquarters and Headquarters Detachment, 176th Medical Group
- Activated XXX at
- Reorganized and redesignated as Headquarters and Headquarters Detachment, 176th Medical Brigade, June 1993
- Reorganized and redesignated as Headquarters and Headquarters Detachment, 176th Medical Group, June 1996
- Reorganized and redesignated Headquarters and Headquarters Company, 176th Medical Brigade, XXX

=== Honors ===
==== Campaign Participation Credit ====
- World War II
  - Normandy
  - Northern France
  - Rhineland
  - Ardennes-Alsace
  - Central Europe

=== Decorations ===
- Meritorious Unit Citation (Army), Streamer embroidered EUROPEAN THEATER

== Insignia ==
=== Shoulder Sleeve Insignia ===
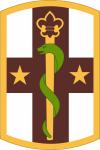
Shoulder Sleeve Insignia, 176th Medical Brigade

==== Description ====
On a white rectangle arched at top and bottom 3 inches (7.62 cm) in height and 2 inches (5.08 cm) in width overall, having at center a maroon cross with arms extending throughout, thereon between two gold stars a green serpent entwined around a gold staff charged at top with a maroon fleur-de-lis, all within a 1/8 inch (.32 cm) gold border.

==== Symbolism ====
Maroon and white are the colors traditionally associated with the Medical Corps. The cross and staff of Aesculapius, symbols of healing and medicine, highlight the Brigades mission. The fleur-de-lis alludes to the units World War II campaign participation in France. The two stars represent Texas, the location of the Brigades Headquarters when activated in 2010 and California, the location of the units Headquarters as a Medical Group from 1981 through 2010. The gold border is emblematic of honor and excellence in service.

==== Background ====
The shoulder sleeve insignia was approved on 21 May 2014. (TIOH Dwg. No. A-1-1095)

=== Distinctive Unit Insignia ===
Distinctive Unit Insignia, 176th Medical Brigade

==== Description ====
A gold color metal and enamel device 1 1/8 inches (2.86 cm) in height consisting of a white disc charged with an overlapping maroon cross on a gold sun. Overall, in pale throughout, a caduceus bearing a red fleur-de-lis at its top. Arching to base over the sun rays a dark blue motto scroll bearing the words TO SERVE PROUDLY in gold letters.

==== Symbolism ====
White and maroon are the colors for Medical units. The red cross is a traditional symbol of medical services and the white disc suggests purity. The sun is symbolic of California, the home area of the unit. The caduceus is a traditional symbol of medicine and is topped by a fleur-de-lis alluding to the units World War II campaign participation in France and Central Europe, and is red suggesting the Meritorious Unit Commendation awarded the unit for service in the World War II European Theater.

==== Background ====
The distinctive unit insignia was originally approved for the 176th Medical Group on 12 April 1983. It was redesignated for the 176th Medical Brigade with the description updated effective 16 September 2011.

== History ==
=== World War II ===
The 176th Medical Battalion was activated at Camp Forrest, Tennessee on 15 September 1943 when the 68th Medical Regiment was broken up to form the 68th Medical Group and other separate, numbered medical Units. The Headquarters and Headquarters Detachment of the 176th Medical Battalion was formed using the personnel and equipment of the Headquarters, 2nd Battalion, 68th Medical Regiment. At the same time, the 2nd Battalions four companies became separate companies, with Company E becoming the 452nd Medical Company (Clearing), Company F becoming the 453rd Medical Company (Clearing), Company G becoming the 618th Medical Company (Clearing), and all four of the companies were attached to the 176th Medical Battalion—in effect, keeping the former 2nd Battalion, 68th Medical Regiment intact for the time being, and the battalion was attached to the 68th Medical Group for command and control purposes.

=== California ===
In 1981, the 176th was reactivated as an Army Reserve headquarters—this time as a medical group-in California.

=== Texas ===
In 2010, the 176th Medical Group was relocated to Seagoville, Texas, (less personnel and equipment).

== Commanders ==
Image	Rank	Name	Branch	Begin date	End date	Notes
	Major	Ralph H. Shilling	MC	15 September 1943		Previously assigned as battalion surgeon, 13th Infantry Regiment
	Lieutenant Colonel	James F. Barnard			1945	In command at the beginning of 1945, in command through 30 June 1945
		Inactive		1945		
	Colonel					
	Colonel					
	Colonel	Richard D. Lynch	MC	September 1988	June 1995	Left to command 2nd Medical Brigade.
	Colonel	Kenneth D. Herbst	MC	June 1995	October 1997	Retired as a Major General
	Colonel					
	Colonel	Michael H. Walter	MC	October 1999	May 2001	Retired as a Brigadier General
	Colonel					
	Colonel					
	Colonel	George M. Soohoo			October 2012	
	Colonel	Joe D. Robinson	MC	October 2012	7 February 2015	Later commanded the 3rd Medical Command;retired as a Major General
	Colonel	Marvin Jensen		7 February 2015		
	Colonel					
	Colonel					
	Colonel					
	Colonel					
	Colonel					
	Colonel					

== Historic organization ==
=== 15 September 1943 ===
- HHD, 176th Medical Battalion
- 452nd Medical Company (Collecting)
- 453rd Medical Company (Collecting)
- 454th Medical Company (Collecting)
- 618th Medical Company (Clearing)
