= 307th Medical Brigade =

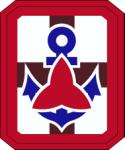
- Shoulder sleeve insignia
- Country: United States
- Branch: United States Army Reserve
- Type: Medical brigade
- Size: Brigade
- Part of: 807th Theater Medical Command
- Garrison/HQ: Blacklick, Ohio
- Motto: Conserve by Strength
- Colors: Maroon and White
- Engagements: Kosovo Defense

Insignia
- Distinctive unit insignia

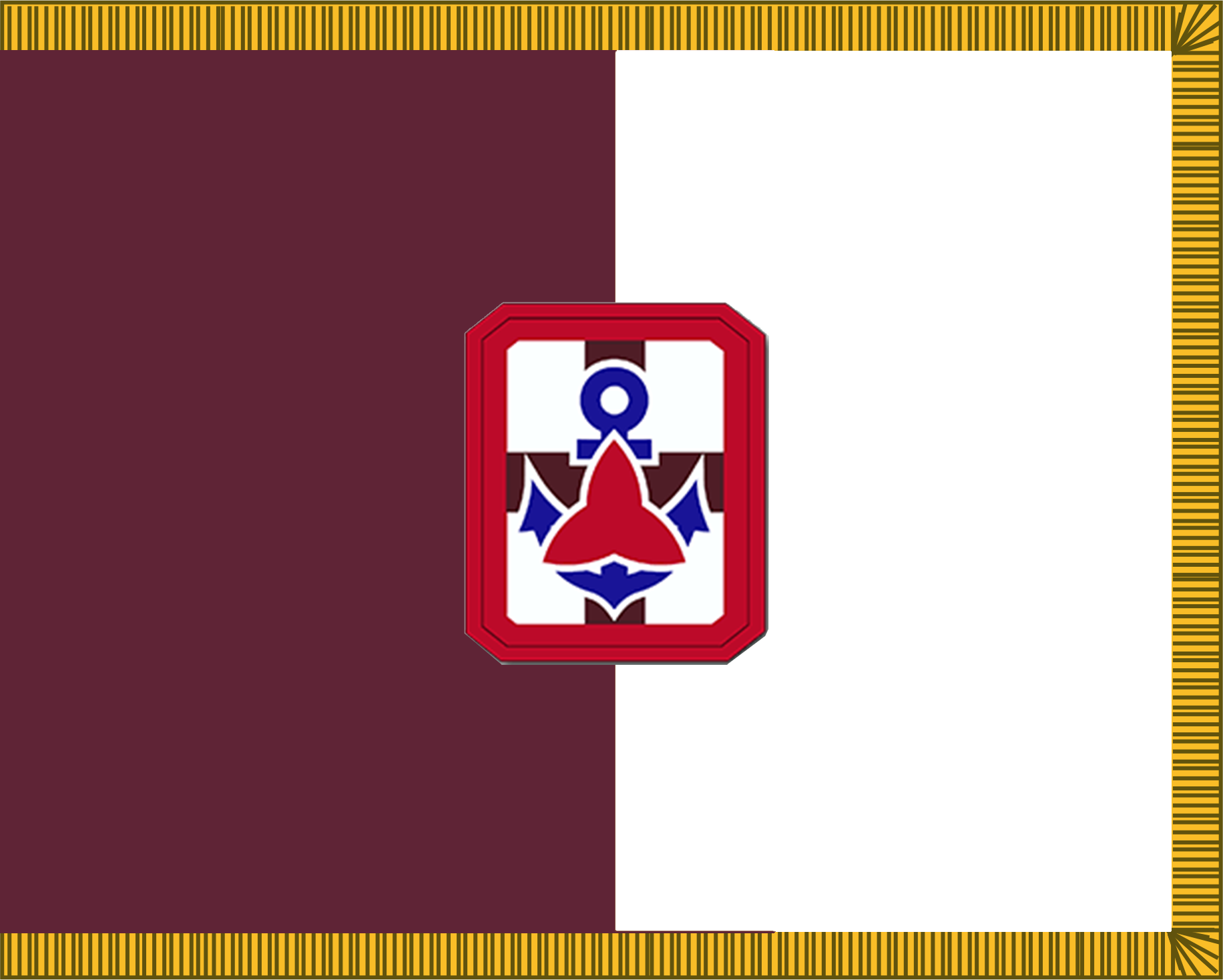
- 307th Medical Brigade Flag

The 307th Medical Brigade is a medical brigade of the United States Army Reserve subordinate to the 807th Medical Command and headquartered in Blacklick, Ohio, a suburb of Colombus.

== Current organization ==
The 307th Medical Brigade is a subordinate unit of the 807th Theater Medical Command. As of January 2026 the brigade consists of the following units:

- 307th Medical Brigade, in Blacklick (OH)
  - Headquarters and Headquarters Company, 307th Medical Brigade, in Blacklick (OH)
  - 401st Medical Company (Logistics), in Grand Rapids (MI)
  - 912th Dental Company (Area Support), in Twinsburg (OH)
  - 806th Hospital Center, in Twinsburg (OH)
    - Headquarters and Headquarters Detachment, in Twinsburg (OH)
    - 256th Field Hospital (32 Bed), in Twinsburg (OH)
      - Headquarters and Headquarters Detachment, in Twinsburg (OH)
      - 148th Medical Detachment Team (Optometry), in Southfield (MI)
      - 360th Medical Detachment (Hospital Augmentation, Intermediate Care Ward 60 Bed), in Twinsburg (OH)
      - 366th Medical Detachment (Hospital Augmentation, Surgical 24 Bed), in Twinsburg (OH)
      - 371st Medical Detachment (Minimal Care), in Twinsburg (OH)
      - 848th Medical Detachment Team (Forward Resuscitative and Surgical), in Twinsburg (OH)
      - 948th Medical Detachment Team (Forward Resuscitative and Surgical), in Southfield (MI)
    - 311th Field Hospital (32 Bed), in Blacklick (OH)
      - Headquarters and Headquarters Detachment, in Blacklick (OH)
      - 55th Medical Detachment (Combat and Operational Stress Control — COSC), in Indianapolis (IN)
      - 363rd Medical Detachment (Hospital Augmentation, Intermediate Care Ward 60 Bed), in Sharonville (OH)
      - 421st Medical Detachment (Hospital Augmentation, Medical 32 Bed), in Blacklick (OH)
      - 629th Medical Detachment Team (Forward Resuscitative and Surgical), in Blacklick (OH)
      - 676th Medical Company (Ground Ambulance), in Indianapolis (IN)
      - 932nd Medical Detachment Team (Forward Resuscitative and Surgical), in Indianapolis (IN)

== Lineage and Honors ==
=== Lineage ===
- Constituted 5 November 1962 in the United States Army Reserve as Headquarters and Headquarters Detachment, 307th Medical Group
- Activated 7 January 1963 at Colombus, Ohio
- Reorganized and redesignated XXX as Headquarters and Headquarters Company, 307th Medical Brigade

=== Honors ===
==== Campaign Participation Credit ====
- Kosovo Defense

=== Decorations ===
- None

== Insignia ==
=== Shoulder Sleeve Insignia ===
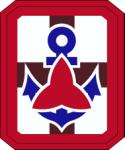
Shoulder Sleeve Insignia, 4th Medical Brigade

==== Description ====
Within a red block "O" shaped insignia a white field charged with a maroon cross surmounted by a blue anchor and scarlet trefoil both bordered white; all within a 1/8 inch (.32 cm) red border. The overall dimensions are 3 inches (7.62 cm) in height and 2 1/2 inches (6.35 cm) in width.

==== Symbolism ====
The block "O" and trefoil resembling the buckeye seed represents Ohio, known as the Buckeye State. The anchor is taken from the Columbus coat of arms and alludes to the city of Columbus and the great lakes region, the home of the organization and its command. The maroon cross in the color of the Army Medical Department is a symbol for aid and assistance and reflects the mission of the organization.

==== Background ====
The shoulder sleeve insignia was approved on 24 January 2013. (TIOH Dwg. No. A-1-1084)

=== Distinctive Unit Insignia ===
Distinctive Unit Insignia, 307th Medical Brigade

==== Description ====
A silver color metal and enamel device 1 1/8 inches (2.86 cm) in height overall consisting of a maroon cross surmounted at center by a red trefoil, and supporting on the horizontal arms two blue anchors inclined toward the center all above a red scroll, the ends curving upwards and terminating behind and above the anchors and inscribed "CONSERVE BY STRENGTH" in silver letters.

==== Symbolism ====
Maroon and white are the colors used for Medical organizations. The cross, a traditional symbol for aid and assistance, symbolizes the basic mission of the unit. The trefoil simulating the seed of the buckeye tree refers to Ohio, known as the Buckeye State, and together with the anchors taken from the coat of arms of Columbia alludes to the city of Columbus, home of the organization.

==== Background ====
The distinctive unit insignia was originally approved for the 307th Medical Group on 30 June 1971. It was redesignated for the 307th Medical Brigade with the description and symbolism updated effective 16 September 2011.

=== Combat Service Identification Badge ===
==== Description ====
A silver color metal and enamel device 2 inches (5.08 cm) in height consisting of a design similar to the shoulder sleeve insignia.

== History ==
During the reorganization of the United States Army Reserve in 1962, the 806th Hospital Center, a Reserve Unit stationed in Colombus, Ohio was scheduled to be inactivated. Upon its inactivation, the center commander, Brigadier General Carl S. Junkermann, Medical Corps, USAR, retired, and 10 officers and 21 enlisted were transferred to form the 307th Medical Group's headquarters, which had an authorized strength, per its Modified Table of Organization and Equipment of 7 officers, 1 warrant officer, and 21 enlisted.

The unit's first commander, Colonel William W. Davis, MC, USAR, was a physician whose civilian practice was in industrial medicine who was the Director of Medical Services at the North American Aviation plant in Colombus, Ohio. Davis had served in the 10th Evacuation Hospital in the Pacific Theater in World War II, and left command to assume command of the newly activated 2291st U.S. Army Hospital, a 1,000 bed Table of Distribution and Allowances organization in Colombus. He would be promoted to Brigadier General and command the 2291st until his retirement in 1969.

Davis was replaced by Colonel Walter Baum, Medical Corps, USAR. Baum had served as the battalion surgeon of the 55th Anti-Aircraft Artillery (Automatic Weapons) Battalion with the Ninth United States Army in the European Theater of Operations in World War II and held the Combat Medical Badge. In his civilian capacity, Baum was in private practice in Internal Medicine in Colombus and was a member of the Central Ohio Medical Clinic, also in Colombus.

== Commanders ==
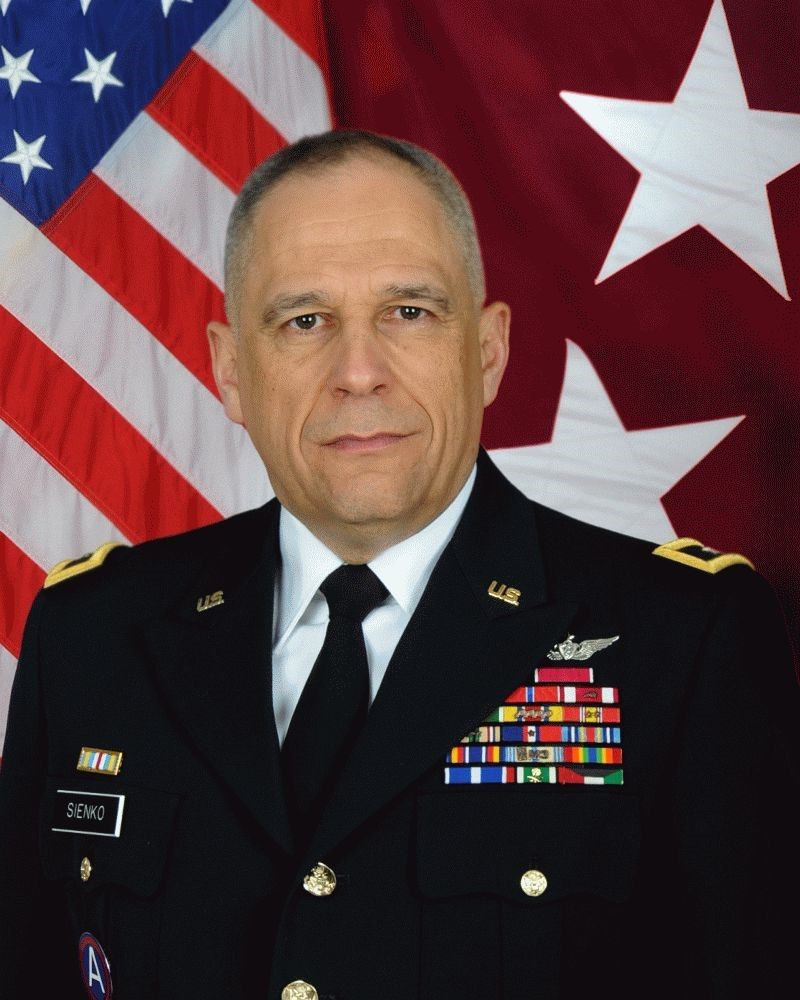
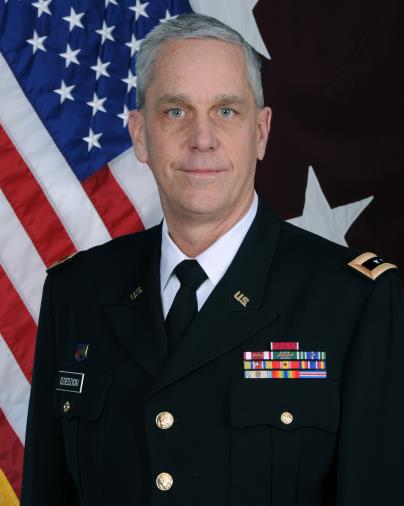
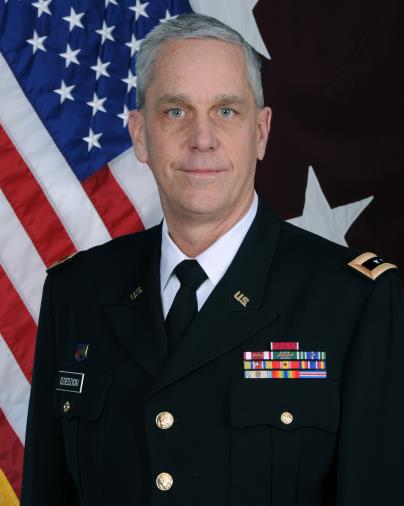
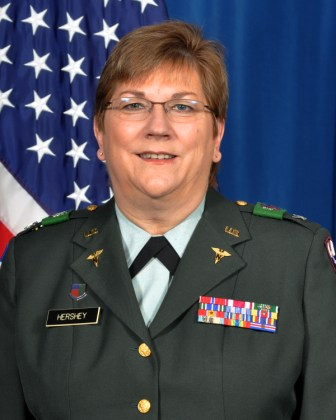
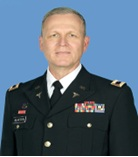
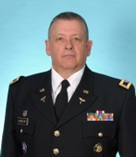
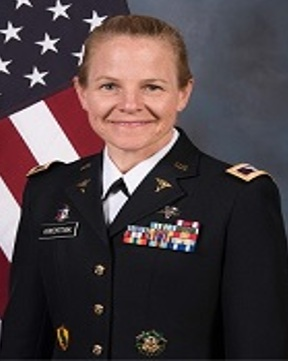
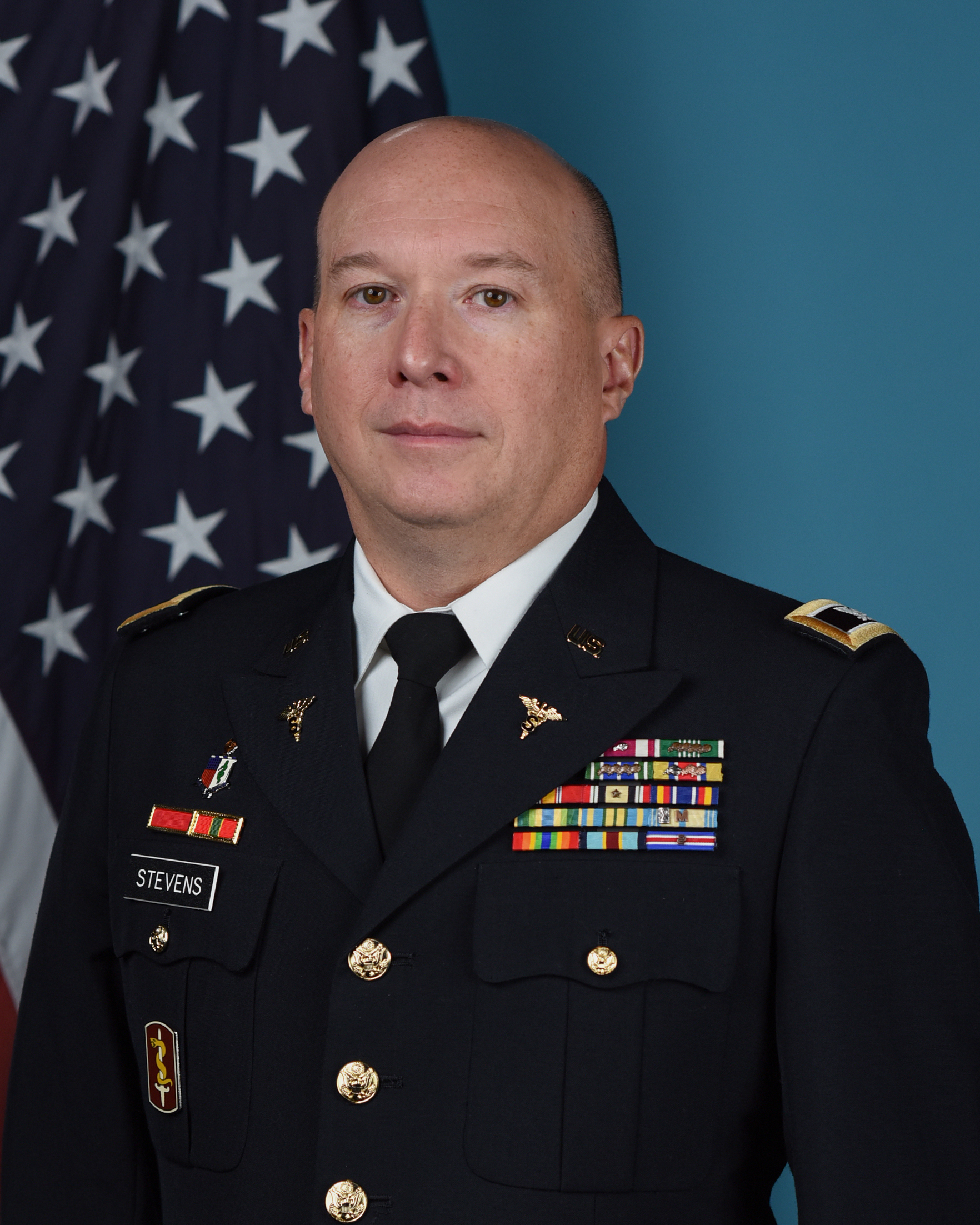
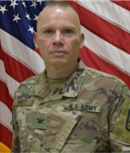
Image	Rank	Name	Branch	Begin date	End date	Notes
	Colonel	William Wiant Davis	MC	7 January 1963	13 April 1963	Retired as a Brigadier General
	Colonel	William Baum	MC	13 April 1963
	Colonel
	Colonel
	Colonel
	Colonel
	Colonel
	Colonel
	Colonel
	Colonel
	Colonel
	Colonel
	Colonel	William B. Merryman	MC			In command in 1976; Retired as a Brigadier General
	Colonel	William K. Whitehouse	MC			In command in 1980
	Colonel
	Colonel
	Colonel
	Colonel
	Colonel
	Colonel	Dean G. Sienko	MC	December 1999	September 2002	Deployed the group headquarters to Kosovo as Task Force Med Falcon, March-October 2001; Retired as a Major General
	Colonel	Jim Snyder	MC	September 2002
	Colonel
	Colonel
	Colonel	Sharon A. R. Stanley	AN			Left command before 2009
		Mary Bolk	AN
	Colonel	Ronald E. Dziedzicki	AN	May 2007	May 2008	Left command to serve as Chief of Staff of 330th Medical Brigade
	Colonel					Interim
	Colonel	Ronald E. Dziedzicki	AN	May 2009	October 2010	Retired as a Major General
	Colonel	Donna N. Hershey	AN	9 October 2010	5 October 2013
	Colonel	Steven A. Severyn	MC	2 November 2013	10 July 2015
	Colonel	Kirk M. Vincent	AN	11 July 2015
	Colonel	Stephanie Wolloff	AN
	Colonel	Charles M. Ware	MC		9 September 2021
	Colonel	Bryan V. Stevens	SP	10 September 2021	4 August 2023
	Colonel	Robby W. Wyatt	MC	5 August 2023	19 June 2025
	Lieutenant Colonel	Derrick L. Williams	AN	20 June 2025	8 August 2025	Interim
	Colonel	Matthew J. White	MS	9 August 2025

== Historic organization ==
=== 10 June 1963 ===
- HHD, 307th Medical Group, Colombus, Ohio
- 55th Medical Detachment (Team QA) (Intelligence), Colombus, Ohio
- 373rd Medical Detachment (Team KJ) (Dental Services), Colombus, Ohio
- HHD, 435th Medical Battalion, Urbana, Ohio
  - 321st Ambulance Train
