= 307th =

307th may refer to:

- 307th (RHA) (South Nottinghamshire Hussars Yeomanry) Field Regiment, Royal Artillery, unit of the British Army formed as volunteer cavalry in 1794
- 307th Air Division, inactive United States Air Force organization
- 307th Air Refueling Squadron, inactive United States Air Force unit
- 307th Bomb Wing, Air Reserve Component (ARC) of the United States Air Force
- 307th Bombardment Squadron, (later 501st Fighter-Bomber Squadron), 10 February 1942 – 1 May 1944
- 307th Cavalry Regiment (United States), cavalry unit of the United States Army during World War I and the interwar period
- 307th Fighter Squadron, part of Air Force Reserve Command's 414th Fighter Group stationed at Seymour Johnson Air Force Base, North Carolina
- 307th Hospital of Chinese People's Liberation Army (Chinese: 307医院), is a hospital in China
- 307th Infantry Brigade (United Kingdom) (307 Bde) was a formation of the British Army from surplus Royal Artillery personnel retrained as infantry
- 307th Infantry Regiment (United States), National Army unit first organized for service in World War I as part of the 77th Infantry Division in Europe
- 307th Marine Battalion, navy branch of the Romanian Armed Forces, operating in the Black Sea and on the Danube
- 307th Operations Group, Air Reserve Component (ARC) of the United States Air Force
- 307th Rifle Division (Soviet Union), raised in 1941 as a standard Red Army rifle division
- 307th Troop Carrier Squadron, USAF squadron activated as an operational training unit (OTU) in March 1943

== See also ==
- 307 (number)
- 307 (disambiguation)
- 307, the year 307 (CCCVII) of the Julian calendar
- 307 BC
