= 139th Illinois Infantry Regiment =

139th Regiment Illinois Volunteer Infantry
- Illinois state flag
- Active: June 1, 1864, to October 25, 1864
- Country: United States
- Allegiance: Union
- Branch: Infantry

The 139th Regiment Illinois Volunteer Infantry was an infantry regiment that served in the Union Army during the American Civil War. It was among scores of regiments that were raised in the summer of 1864 as Hundred Days Men, an effort to augment existing manpower for an all-out push to end the war within 100 days.

== Service ==
The 139th Illinois Infantry was organized at Peoria, Illinois, and mustered into Federal service on June 1, 1864, for a one-hundred-day enlistment. It departed for St. Louis by steamboat on June 8, arriving there on the 10th. From there it moved to Columbus, Kentucky, for a week, and from thence to Cairo, Illinois, where it performed garrison duty.

Around August 1, the regiment was directed by General Payne, commanding the Department of Northern Kentucky, to raid several nearby farms owned by Confederate sympathizers, to seize horses and cattle to make up for livestock stolen by guerillas. The raid was successful, resulting also in the capture of two of the raiders. The regiment returned to Cairo until September 25, when it was returned to Peoria to be mustered out of service.

Although its initial term of enlistment had expired, the regiment was asked by President Abraham Lincoln to assist Federal efforts against General Sterling Price during his Raid into Missouri. When the men agreed to go, Lincoln sent them a letter, thanking them for their patriotism and willingness to serve. The 139th marched toward Franklin, Missouri, as part of the Union pursuit of Price in October of that year, but the Battle of Westport on 23 October forced Price to retreat southward and ended the need for the 139th Regiment's service. The Regiment mustered out two days later, and did not lose any men in action.

== Total strength and casualties ==
The regiment suffered 16 enlisted men who died of disease.

== Commanders ==
- Colonel Peter Davidson - mustered out with the regiment.

== See also ==
- List of Illinois Civil War Units
- Illinois in the American Civil War
