= 139th Ohio Infantry Regiment =

- Active: May 11, 1864, to August 26, 1864
- Country: United States
- Allegiance: Union
- Branch: Infantry

The 139th Ohio Infantry Regiment, sometimes 139th Ohio Volunteer Infantry (or 139th OVI) was an infantry regiment in the Union Army during the American Civil War.

== Service ==
The 139th Ohio Infantry was organized at Camp Chase in Columbus, Ohio, and mustered in May 11, 1864, for 100 days service under the command of Colonel Jacob Lloyd Wayne Jr..

The regiment left Ohio for Washington, D.C., May 20, then moved to Point Lookout, Md., June 1, and was assigned to prison guard duty there until August 22.

The 139th Ohio Infantry mustered out of service August 26, 1864.

== Ohio National Guard ==
Over 35,000 Ohio National Guardsmen were federalized and organized into regiments for 100 days service in May 1864. Shipped to the Eastern Theater, they were designed to be placed in "safe" rear areas to protect railroads and supply points, thereby freeing regular troops for Lt. Gen. Ulysses S. Grant’s push on the Confederate capital of Richmond, Virginia. As events transpired, many units found themselves in combat, stationed in the path of Confederate Gen. Jubal Early’s veteran Army of the Valley during its famed Valley Campaigns of 1864. Ohio Guard units met the battle-tested foe head on and helped blunt the Confederate offensive thereby saving Washington, D.C. from capture. Ohio National Guard units participated in the battles of Monacacy, Fort Stevens, Harpers Ferry, and in the siege of Petersburg.

== Casualties ==
The regiment lost 14 enlisted men during service, all due to disease.

== Commanders ==
- Lieutenant Colonel Jacob Lloyd Wayne Jr.

== See also ==
- List of Ohio Civil War units
- Ohio in the Civil War
