= 139th Indiana Infantry Regiment =

- Active: June 5, 1864 – September 29, 1865
- Disbanded: September 29, 1865
- Country: United States
- Allegiance: Union
- Branch: Infantry
- Size: Regiment
- Engagements: American Civil War

The 139th Indiana Infantry Regiment served in the Union Army between June 5, 1864, and September 29, 1865, during the American Civil War.

== Service ==
The regiment was organized at Indianapolis, Indiana, and mustered in on June 5, 1864. It was ordered to Tennessee and Alabama for railroad guard duty, until late September 1865. The regiment was mustered out on September 29, 1865. During its service the regiment lost eleven men to disease.

== See also ==
- List of Indiana Civil War regiments

== Bibliography ==
- Dyer, Frederick H. (1959). A Compendium of the War of the Rebellion. New York and London. Thomas Yoseloff, Publisher. LCCN 59-12963.
