= 57th Medical Detachment =

57th Medical Detachment (Helicopter Ambulance)
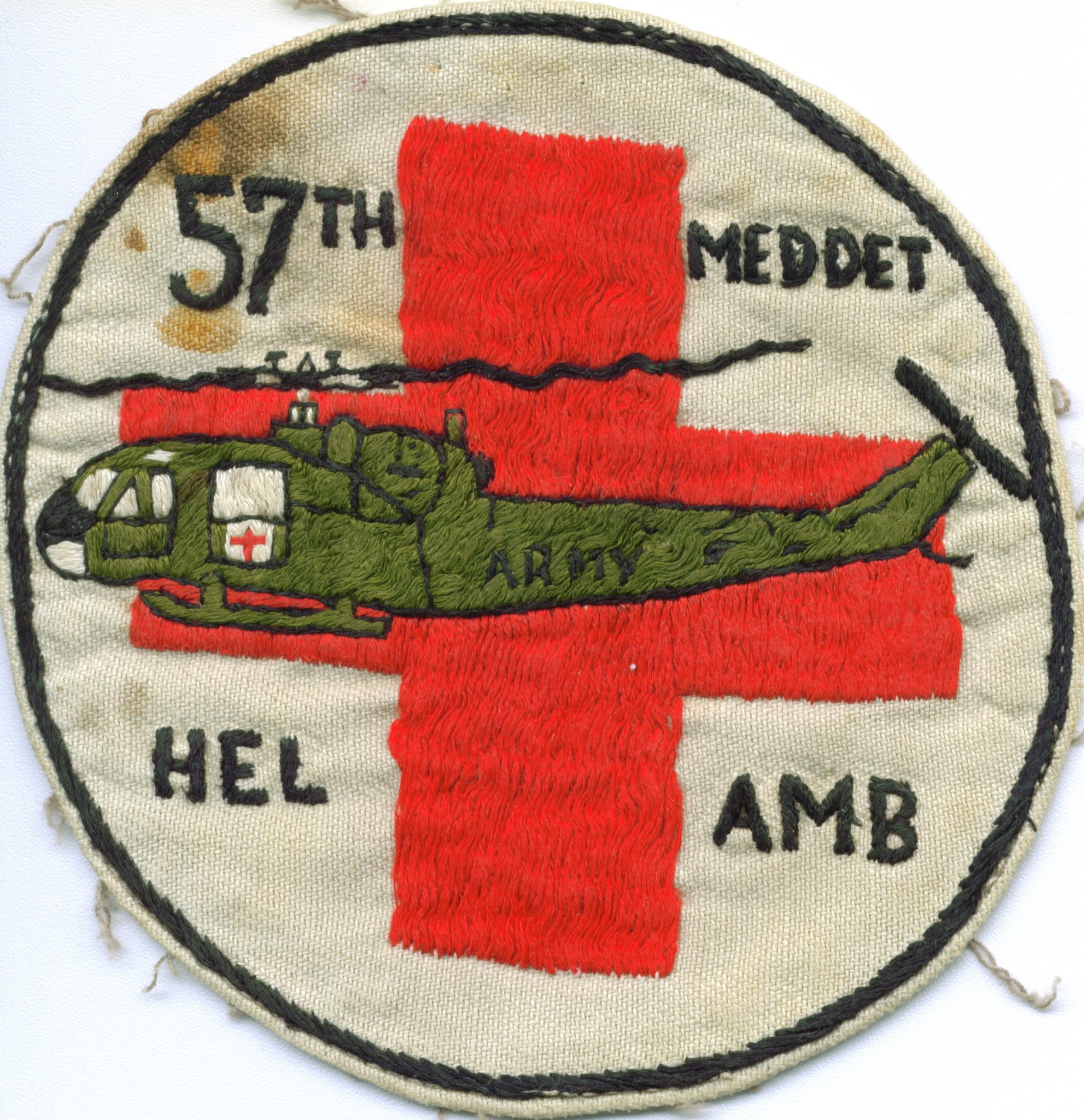
- 57th Medical Detachment (Helicopter Ambulance) Insignia worn by Major Charles L. Kelly
- Active: 19 September 1943 – 30 September 1945; 23 March 1953 – 15 June 2007
- Country: US
- Branch: Regular Army
- Garrison/HQ: Fort Bragg
- Nickname: The Original Dustoff
- Engagements: Vietnam War; Operation Urgent Fury; Operation Desert Storm; Operation Enduring Freedom; Operation Iraqi Freedom

Commanders
- Notable commanders: Major Charles L. Kelly

The 57th Medical Detachment (Helicopter Ambulance) was a US Army unit located at Fort Bragg, North Carolina, which provided aeromedical evacuation support to the Fort Bragg community, while training in its combat support mission. The first helicopter ambulance unit to be fielded the UH-1 Huey helicopter, it was also the first unit to deploy to Vietnam with the UH-1, and the first unit to fly them in combat, in 1962. By the time the detachment redeployed to the continental United States ten years, ten months, and seventeen days later, its crews had evacuated nearly 78,000 patients. The unit's callsign, "Dustoff," selected in 1963, is now universally associated with United States Army aeromedical evacuation units.

- The unit was originally formed as the 57th Malaria Control Unit in 1943 and served in Brazil during World War II. It was later redesignated as the 57th Medical Detachment in 1953 and activated at Fort Sam Houston, Texas.
- The unit's crews evacuated nearly 78,000 patients during its ten-year service in Vietnam. One of its most notable members was Major Charles L. Kelly, who was killed in action in 1964 while attempting to rescue wounded South Vietnamese soldiers under heavy fire. He is remembered as the “Father of Dustoff”."
- The unit also served in Grenada in 1983, where it evacuated 160 casualties during Operation Urgent Fury, Operation Desert Storm in 1991, where it flew over 600 missions and evacuated over 1,000 patients, as well as Afghanistan in 2002 and Iraq in 2003 as part of Operation Enduring Freedom and Operation Iraqi Freedom respectively.

== Lineage ==
- Constituted 1 September 1943 in the Army of the United States as the 57th Malaria Control Unit
- Activated 19 September 1943 at Army Service Forces Unit Training Center, New Orleans, Louisiana
- Reorganized and redesignated 8 April 1945 as the 57th Malaria Control Detachment
- Inactivated 30 September 1945 in Brazil
- Redesignated 23 March 1953 as the 57th Medical Detachment and allotted to the Regular Army
- Activated 6 April 1953 at Brooke Army Medical Center, Fort Sam Houston, Texas
- Reorganized and redesignated 1 July 1960 as the 57th Medical Platoon
- Reorganized and redesignated 10 March 1961 as the 57th Medical Detachment
- Reorganized and redesignated 16 November 1992 as the 57th Medical Company
- Inactivated 15 June 2007 at Fort Bragg, North Carolina

== Honors ==
=== Campaign participation credit ===
World War II

- American Campaign Streamer Without Inscription

Vietnam

- Advisory
- Defense
- Counteroffensive
- Counteroffensive, Phase II
- Counteroffensive, Phase III
- Tet Counteroffensive
- Counteroffensive, Phase IV
- Counteroffensive, Phase V
- Counteroffensive, Phase VI
- Tet 69/Counteroffensive
- Summer-Fall 1969
- Winter-Spring 1970
- Sanctuary Counteroffensive
- Counteroffensive, Phase VII
- Consolidation I
- Consolidation II
- Cease-Fire

Armed Forces Expeditions

- Grenada

Southwest Asia

- Defense of Saudi Arabia
- Liberation and Defense of Kuwait

Global War on Terror

- To be officially determined

=== Decorations ===
- Presidential Unit Citation (Army), Streamer embroidered DONG XOAI
- Valorous Unit Award, Detachment, 57th Medical Company, Streamer not authorized for the company as a whole
- Meritorious Unit Commendation (Army), Streamer embroidered VIETNAM 1964-1965
- Meritorious Unit Commendation (Army), Streamer embroidered VIETNAM 1968
- Meritorious Unit Commendation (Army), Streamer embroidered VIETNAM 1969-1970
- Meritorious Unit Commendation (Army), Streamer embroidered VIETNAM 1970-1971
- Meritorious Unit Commendation (Army), Streamer embroidered VIETNAM 1972-1973
- Meritorious Unit Commendation (Army), Streamer embroidered SOUTHWEST ASIA 1990-1991
- Meritorious Unit Commendation (Army), Streamer embroidered SOUTHWEST ASIA 2003
- Meritorious Unit Commendation (Army), Streamer embroidered IRAQ 2005-2006
- Vietnamese Cross of Gallantry with Palm, Streamer embroidered VIETNAM 1964

== Early history ==
=== Fort Sam Houston, Texas ===
The 57th Medical Detachment (Helicopter Ambulance), a General Reserve Unit attached to Headquarters, 37th Medical Battalion (Separate), Medical Field Service School for administration, was further attached for training and operational control. The detachment was activated by General Order Number 10, Headquarters, Brooke Army Medical Center, Fort Sam Houston, Texas, dated 6 April 1953, under TO&E 8–500, Cell: RA, 25 August 1952. By 31 December 1953, the unit had approximately 95 percent of its authorized equipment.

Captain John W Hammett was assigned as the detachment's first commander, and both organized the detachment and trained its newly assigned aviators, who were all newly assigned Medical Service Corps officers fresh out of flight school as well as leading the unit through its first unit tests. The detachment was equipped with H-13E aircraft with exterior mounted litters and litter covers.

The principal activity of this unit consisted of participation in evacuation demonstrations for the Medical Field Service School.

Six officers and 26 enlisted men were assigned to the unit at year end. The total authorized strength of the detachment was 7 officers and 24 enlisted.

Unit training began on 21 September 1953. In accordance with Army Training Program 8–220. Almost immediately many problems were encountered. The principal difficulty was in the maintenance of aircraft, Within a few days after unit training had begun the program was partially abandoned. On 21 October 1953 the detachment was attached to the 37th Medical Battalion (separate), Medical Field Service School, for administration and training. On 6 October 1953 the unit training was again started with certain modifications of the program to allow more time for aircraft maintenance. This training was completed by 31 December 1953.

Effective 7 January 1954 the 57th Medical Detachment (Helicopter Ambulance) and the 274th Medical Detachment (Helicopter Ambulance), assigned to Brooke Army Medical Center, Fort Sam Houston, Texas were relieved from attachment to the Medical Field Service School and were attached to Brooks Air Force Base for quarters and rations in accordance with General Order Number 2, Headquarters, Brooke Army Medical Center, Fort Sam Houston, Texas, dated 22 January 1954.

From 28 June through 4 July 1954, all of the aircraft assigned to Brooke Army Medical Center, including those of the 57th and 274th under Hammett's command, were deployed to support flood relief efforts along the Rio Grande River near Langtry, Texas, caused by Hurricane Agnes. The detachments sent seven aircraft to Laughlin Air Force Base and began using it as a base for their search operations. They began by evacuating passengers, luggage, and mail from a Southern Pacific train which had been cut off from ground evacuation, evacuating 85 passengers to the air base, and then again when shortages of drinking water occurred on the base. The aftermath of the storm made flying difficult.

During the period 9 February — 2 March 1955, the 67th Medical Group with attached 603d Medical Company (Clearing)(Separate) and the 57th Medical Detachment (Helicopter Ambulance) was attached to III Corps at Fort Hood, Texas, for participation in Exercise Blue Bolt. Attached to the Group upon arrival from Fort Riley, Kansas was the 47th Surgical Hospital and 928th Medical Company (Ambulance)(Separate). The Group's assigned mission was to furnish field Army Medical Service support (actual and simulated) to the 1st Armored Division and III Corps. One hundred twenty-eight actual casualties were evacuated to the 603d Medical Company (Clearing). The Ambulance Company evacuated 1025 simulated and actual patients. The 57th Medical Detachment (Helicopter Ambulance) had the mission of evacuating actual casualties, completing seven pickups with an average patient delivery time of 38 minutes. This was an outstanding accomplishment when measured against the time space factors involved. Twelve hundred patients were routed through an Evacuation Hospital (simulated) established and operated by the Clearing Company.

Effective 10 July 1955, the 67th Medical Group was temporarily reorganized to the 67th Medical Service Battalion (ATFA Provisional) by General Order 21, Brooke Army Medical Center, 7 July 1955. The 32d Medical Depot (Army), 47th and 53d Field Hospitals, and the 82d Medical Detachment (Helicopter Ambulance) were also reorganized as ATFA Provisional units by the same authority. On 15 July 1955, Dental Service Team KJ (Provisional #1), Team KJ (Provisional #2), and Medical Detachment (ATFA Provisional Team QA) were activated by Brooke Army Medical Center and attached to the 67th Medical Service Battalion (ATFA). These units were to participate in Exercise Sagebrush during the forthcoming months. The 57th Medical Detachment (Helicopter Ambulance) was also to participate.

On 1 September 1955 an extensive program of training was placed in effect to prepare all participating units for Sagebrush. Many obstacles in personnel, equipment, and limited training time were encountered. By 15 October after extensive field preparation to include special ATFA testing by Brooke Army Medical Center, these units were considered sufficiently advanced to assume their responsibility though 25% of the newly assigned personnel in the field hospitals lacked the MOS training required. Just prior to leaving, the Group presented the largest mounted review in Brooke Army Medical Center history. Approximately 250 vehicles of all types participated.

On 25 October 1955 all units moved overland to Louisiana. No major accidents occurred. Valuable experience in atomic warfare operations and the handling of mass casualties was received. The hospitals provided medical care and treatment for both actual and simulated casualties. The 67th Medical Service Battalion exercised operational control over attached medical units. The 57th Medical Detachment (Helicopter Ambulance) received a mission of evacuating actual casualties, reconnaissance, and supply, flying a total of 289 hours. The 82d Medical Detachment (Helicopter Ambulance) was further attached to III Corps as a part of the III Corps Aviation Company, executing a total of 165 missions involving 313 flying hours. The 32d Medical Depot (ATFA) supported all units of the Ninth Army during the maneuver. Approximately 10 tons of medical supplies were received, separated, stored, and tallied.

At the conclusion of the exercise, all ATFA Medical units returned to Fort Sam Houston in December with the exception of the 47th Field Hospital which remained in the maneuver area on temporary duty at Fort Polk, Louisiana, rendering medical support to Engineer and Signal Corps units. The unit engaged in the close out phase remained ATFA Provisional at end of 1955.

General Order 42, Brooke Army Medical Center, 13 December 1955, discontinued all returned provisional units as of 14 December. The remainder of the reporting period was spent on ATFA equipment organization, cleaning, and return.

During December 1955, a part of the 57th Medical Detachment (Helicopter Ambulance) was preparing for departure in January 1956 for Alaska to participate in Exercise Moose Horn. Effort was being made to properly equip this element for the maneuver.

New H-19D aircraft were received by both the 57th and the 82d Medical Detachments beginning in August 1956, with the final aircraft received in the latter part of December. Since the 57th and 82d shared a hangar at Brooks Air Force Base, the 57th painted a circular white background for the red cross on the noses of their aircraft, while the 82d used a square background.

In 1957, the 57th Medical Detachment (Helicopter Ambulance) was assigned to the Office of the Surgeon General, further assigned to Brooke Army Medical Center, Fort Sam Houston, Texas, for operational control, further assigned to the 67th Medical Group for administration and training and attached to Brooks Air Force Base for rations and quarters.

=== Fort George G. Meade, Maryland ===
In October 1957, after hearing rumors all summer, the 57th received a message alerting the unit for a permanent change of station move to Fort George G. Meade, Maryland. On 17 October the movement directive was received and on 30 October the movement order was published by Brooke Army Medical Center. On 5 November the advanced party departed for Fort Meade by private auto. Upon arrival at Fort Meade, the advance party carried out the necessary details prior to the arrival of the detachment's main body. The main body arrived at Fort Meade on 20 November 1957 with the helicopters arriving on 20 November. The aircraft were ferried by other pilots within BAMC. The unit, upon arrival at Fort Meade, remained assigned to the Office of the Surgeon General, attached to the Second United States Army, further attached to Fort Meade, and then further attached to the 68th Medical Group. The mission of the detachment remained training with a secondary mission of supporting Second Army in emergency medical helicopter evacuations.

On 15 February 1968, one of the largest snowstorms in years fell in the DC-Baltimore metropolitan area. Requests for emergency evacuations began coming in shortly after it appeared that the snowfall was to be heavy and that it was bogging down normal transportation facilities. No missions, however, were flown until 18 February 1958. On 17 February Second Army put an emergency plan into effect which placed all pilots, crews and aircraft under their operational control. The missions flown were as follows:

1. 18 February 1958 - Evacuated 2 pregnant women, one from a farmhouse north of Gaithersburg, Maryland, the other from a farmhouse near Bealsville, Maryland to the National Institutes of Health in Bethesda, Maryland. Total flight time - 02:15
2. 18 February 1958 - Flew 20 cases of five-in-one rations to Fort Detrick, Maryland from Fort Meade. From Fort Detrick flew to Woodbine, Maryland and evacuated a pregnant woman back to Ft. Detrick. Total flight time - 03:05
3. 18 February 1958 - Evacuated 2 patients, both from farmhouses near Chestertown, Maryland to Chestertown Airfield. Total flight time - 02:30
4. 18 February 1958 - Evacuated patient from Bozeman, Maryland to Easton, Maryland. Total flight time - 03:20
5. 19 February 1958 - Evacuated patient from Lewisdale, Maryland to hospital at Laytonsville, Maryland. Total flight time - 03:10
6. 19 February 1958 - Evacuated patient from Sugar Loaf Mountain to Fredrick, Maryland. Total flight time - 02:20
7. 19 February 1958 - Delivered fuel to farmhouse near Savage, Maryland. Total flight time - 00:30
8. 19 February 1958 - Delivered fuel to farmhouse near Savage, Maryland. Total flight time - 00:45
9. 21 February 1958 - Flew 4 photographers to Crystal Beach, Maryland to photograph another mission, Total flight time - 03:30
10. 22 February 1958 - Evacuated patient from Smith Island, Maryland to Crisfield Airfield, Maryland. Total flight time - 04:00
11. 23 February 1958 - Flew to Chestertown, Maryland to search for 2 lost boys. Bodies of 2 drowned boys were found at Panama by boats. Bodies flown from Panama back to Chestertown. Total flight time - 02:30

The detachment came off of alert status on 26 February 1958 and resumed normal duties. The detachment also participated in 68th Medical Group exercises from 4 February to 7 February, evacuating simulated casualties and setting up operations in the field.

On 23 March another big snow crippled the northeast sector of the country, however the roads were readily cleared. The detachment was put on stand-by alert for medical evacuation, but none materialized.

On 23 March one aircraft flew power lines for the Philadelphia Electric Company around the Coatesville, Pennsylvania area carrying company personnel who were checking for downed power lines.

One helicopter was dispatched on 17 July 1958 to support the 338th Medical Group at Fort Meade. It was used for simulated medical evacuations and orientation flights.

An H-19 was sent to Fort Lee, Virginia, on 24 July 1958 to orient reserve personnel on temporary active duty from the 300th Field Hospital. A simulated evacuation and orientation rides were given. A static display of aircraft and a simulated evacuation were shown to Reserve Officers' Training Corps cadets visiting Fort Meade on 31 July 1958.

A lecture was given to personnel of the 314th Station Hospital at Fort Lee, Virginia on 21 August 1958. A simulated evacuation and orientation rides were given, Normal unit missions completed the month.

On 25 September 1958, a mission of a rather unusual nature was accomplished in an H-19. The Maryland Fish and Game Commission requested that the 57th fly a tubful of live fish from Rock Hall, Maryland to Deep Creek Lake in western Maryland. A noncommissioned officer sat in the "hole" with the fish and dropped oxygen tablets in the water, but to no avail. Of the forty striped bass netted from the Chesapeake Bay, only 4 were alive at the conclusion of the flight. This was the first, and probably last, time fish had been transported in this manner.

On 21 September the 57th went on an overnight field problem on the Fort Meade reservation. The new heliport lighting system was tested for the first time and after quite a bit of practice and resetting the equipment, landings were being made at night quite accurately.

On 7 October, one H-19 was sent to Fort A. P. Hill, Virginia to act on a stand-by basis for possible casualties resulting from field exercises. The 79th Engineer Group and the 13th Field Hospital were practicing field problems prior to taking their Army Training Tests. The 57th had one helicopter on a stand-by basis from 7 October to 25 October 1958, but only one minor casualty resulted and was the only helicopter evacuation. The helicopter did carry a doctor daily on sick call trips and made a few reconnaissance missions.

A flight of two helicopters left Fort Meade on 24 November 1958 to make a proficiency cross-country flight to Fort Bragg, North Carolina. The pilots also compared notes on units with their counterparts at Fort Bragg. The flight returned the next day to Fort Meade.

An evacuation flight was accomplished on 6 December 1958. An Army Lieutenant Colonel and his family were in volved in an auto accident at Pulaski, West Virginia and placed in the civilian hospital there. A nurse from the Fort Meade Hospital accompanied the flight. The helicopter arrived back at Fort Meade at 1915 hours with Lieutenant Colonel and his wife, where an ambulance brought them to the Fort Meade Hospital. Total flight time logged that day was 07:35 hours.

On 10 December 1958 a Tuberculosis patient was flown from the Fort Meade Hospital to Valley Forge General Hospital.

The month of January 1959 proved to be quite uneventful until 2000 hours on the 27th. At that time the detachment commander received a call at home from the Second Army Aviation Section. The detachment was requested to leave the next morning for Meadeville, Pennsylvania to fly a demolition team, equipment, photographers and the Second Army Public Information Officer. An ice jam on French Creek was threatening to flood the town if another rainfall fell. Meadeville had been crippled by a flood two days before causing $5 million worth of damage. The flood waters had receded, but unless the ice could be blasted from the creek the town would be flooded all over again. Three of the unit's H-19s departed Fort Meade at 0845 hours, 28 January 1959 with six demolition men from the 19th Engineer Battalion, two photographers from the 67th Signal Battalion and the Second Army Public Information Office. Also on the flight were three crew chiefs, and six pilots, one of whom was borrowed from the 36th Evacuation Hospital since the detachment had only five pilots present for duty. The flight of three arrived at Meadeville at 1400 hours and was met at the airfield by the Reserve Advisors for the area, one of whom was made chief of the ice blasting operations. A reconnaissance flight was made of the ice at 1630 hours that afternoon and the next day, blasting operations began. Reinforcements were brought up via bus from the 19th Engineer Battalion to aid in blasting. The primary duty of the H-19s was to reconnoiter the area and during the last few days to carry 540-pound loads of TNT and drop if from a hover to the demolition team on the ice. The detachment also carried the teams to the ice in inaccessible areas. Cn 9 February the operation was considered accomplished, and the detachment's helicopters were released. One helicopter had been released on 2 February and returned to Fort Meade. Weather kept the remaining party from leaving until 11 February. One aircraft had to remain at Meadville because of engine failure during warm-up.

Two pilots flew one of the detachment's aircraft to Atlanta, Georgia for major overhaul. They stopped at Fort Benning, Georgia on the way for a tête-à-tête with the 37th Medical Battalion. On 17 April 1959 the detachment had one medical evacuation from Fort Meade to Valley Forge General Hospital.

In May 1959 the detachment flew an evacuation from Fort Belvoir to Walter Reed Army Medical Center. A Second Army L-20 picked-up the patient at Nassawadox, Virginia and flew him to Ft Belvoir where he was transferred to a waiting H-19.

The detachment flew one aircraft to Atlantic City, New Jersey for 4 days Temporary Duty in conjunction with the American Medical Association Convention and one aircraft to Atlanta, Georgia for SCAMP in June 1959.

On 6 July 1959, the detachment used one aircraft to fly medical supplies to Carlisle Barracks, Pennsylvania on an emergency run. The detachment also flew one aircraft to Fort Indiantown Gap Pennsylvania to put on a demonstration for the reserve troops in summer training in July.

On 12 August 1959 the detachment sent one aircraft to Bradford, Pennsylvania to pick-up an Army officer injured in an auto accident. He was flown to Fort Meade and transferred to the hospital. Another aircraft spent 3 days at Philadelphia, Pennsylvania carrying an inspection team to Nike sites.

On 18 August 1959 A Navy family member was evacuated from Bainbridge Naval Center to Bethesda Naval Hospital. The patient had a growth in her throat and could hardly breathe. The Naval doctor accompanying the flight almost had to perform a tracheotomy in the air, but the patient recovered her breathe and made it to the hospital.

On 21 August 1959 the detachment evacuated one patient to Valley Forge General Hospital. This was the same patient brought to Fort Meade from Bradford, Pennsylvania on 12 August.

Medical evacuations increased in September 1959 when a scheduled evacuation run from Carlisle Barracks to Valley Forge General Hospital was initiated - a total of 9 patients were transported this month.

In October 1959, the detachment evacuated a patient with an injured kidney from Chestertown, Maryland to Fort Meade.

In November 1959, flights from Carlisle Barracks to Valley Forge General Hospital were numerous during the month, with 7 patients transported.

As the detachment prepared to transition from H-19s to the first air ambulance detachment to field the HU-1, 1LT John P. Temperilli Jr. returned from the HU-1A Maintenance Course at Fort Worth, Texas and 1LT Paul A. Bloomquist departed for the same course.

Evacuations for the December 1959 decreased, with only 3 patients transported during the month.

Two crews departed for Fort Worth, Texas to pick-up two HU-1As (Tail numbers 58-3022 & 58–3023), they departed Fort Worth on 11 January 1960 to return to Fort Meade HU-1A #3123 developed frost pump trouble in Charlotte, North Carolina.

One crew departed for Fort Worth to pick-up HU-1A tail number 58-3024 and departed Fort Worth for Fort Meade on 21 January 1960.

Two crews departed Fort Worth with HU-1As (Tail numbers 58-3025 and 58–3026) on 26 Jan 60. As of the end of January 1960, the 57th had 5 HU-1As and 4 H-19Ds assigned to the unit.

On 17 February 1960 the detachment performed an emergency evacuation from Bainbridge to Bethesda Naval Hospital. It ended up that 3 aircraft were involved - 1 H-19 and 2 HU-1As. Check-outs began in the HU-1As. Three pilots soloed in the UH-1 during the month, and on 18 February one pilot set a record on time to return to Fort Meade from Felker Army Airfield, 03:35 in two days. This extended time was due to weather - a 40 knot head wind.

On 29 February 1960, the detachment set out for the field. Just prior to completing the tent pitching, the field problem was called off because HU-1A #3024 had a material failure. No injuries were incurred. Damage was $60,000 and probably a new aircraft to replace # 58–3024.

On 5 March the unit started on a routine evacuation mission which turned into a snow emergency at Cambridge, Maryland. Many hours were flown and much rescuing was accomplished.

On 23 March 1960 at 0230 hours the detachment received a call to proceed to Elkins, West Virginia to help search for a downed Air Force plane, Two H-19s left at 0600 that morning. The aircraft was found, but all aboard were killed on impact.

On 30 April, First Lieutenant Bloomquist and Captain Temperilli had the pleasure of flying General Ridgway in the HU-1A. He was impressed.

In May, the unit was alerted to depart for Chile to assist in the disaster caused by an earthquake. All personnel except a rear detachment of one officer and two enlisted deployed with four of the detachment's HU-1As.

The operation in Chile and the detachment returned home on 25 June 1960.

The 57th Medical Detachment was reorganized and redesignated as the 57th Medical Platoon effective 1 July 1960.

One aircraft and crew participated in TRIPHIBOUS OPERATION at Fort Story, Virginia; demonstrating a simulated medevac to a ship.

The 57th Medical Platoon was redesignated the 57th Medical Detachment on 10 March 1961.

In December 1961 the detachment was notified that it would be participating in an exercise in Asia, but before it deployed, the 82d Medical Detachment was substituted for the 57th, and deployed on Exercise Great Shelf in the Philippines in March 1962.

== Operations in Vietnam, 1962–1973 ==
=== Advisory support, 1962–1964 ===
The 57th Medical Detachment (Helicopter Ambulance) received its final alert for overseas deployment on 15 February 1962.

Unit aircraft, one officer and five enlisted departed Fort George G. Meade, Maryland on 3 March 1962 for the Brookley Ocean Terminal in Mobile, Alabama. While in Mobile, the detachment's aircraft were processed for overseas shipment, loaded aboard the USNS Crotan, and arrived at Saigon on 20 April 1962.

Yellow disk TAT equipment and two enlisted departed Fort Meade on 16 April 1962 and arrived in Saigon on 20 April 1962.

The main body of the 57th's personnel departed Fort Meade on 18 April 1962 and arrived at Nha Trang just before noon on 26 April 1962.

The 57th Medical Detachment became operational at Nha Trang on 5 May 1962 when aircraft and fuel became available.

Aircraft were split to station three at Nha Trang and two at Qui Nhon. The detachment did not become operational at Qui Nhon until fuel became available on the 12 June 1962. Lack of information and preparedness when segments of the detachment arrived in South Vietnam was the main reason why operational capability could not be reached sooner than indicated. Contributing factors were a lack of fuel for the aircraft and differences in operational concept as set forth by Letter of Instructions, Headquarters, U.S. Army Support Group, Vietnam, dated 24 April 1962, and those set forth by the detachment commander.

The concept of operations as of the end of July 1962, a 3–2 split of aircraft with supporting personnel was feasible and was being carried out with minor difficulties that could be resolved at the detachment level. A major problem area was the lack of adequate communications. The unit's primary mission of on call Emergency Aeromedical Evacuation could not function properly unless the information on where casualties were located could be relayed to the unit so that a response could be immediate relative to personnel becoming casualties.

No real estate was provided for setting up the detachment at Nha Trang Air Base. The detachment acquired its own real estate but still did not have construction for performing maintenance on organic aircraft. As of the end of July 1962, all supplies were under canvas or in Conex containers. Aircraft maintenance was performed in the open and when inclement weather arrived, maintenance ceased, as has been the case when changing three component parts of the aircraft in June 1962.

Requests for action were slow and in one instance had a demoralizing effect on personnel. The request for flight status on one enlisted performing hazardous duty from the time the unit arrived had not been received as of the end of July 1962.

As of 1 October 1962, a lack of logistical support effected the overall operational capability of the detachment. This was further aggravated by being split into two locations. As of 1 October 1962 it was felt that the need existed for such a split, but unless logistical support for aircraft was improved, some consideration would have to be given to employing the detachment in one location to maintain 24-hour operational capability.

As of 1 October 1962, the detachment was authorized five aircraft and had four assigned:

- Aircraft 58-2081 was EDP for 20 items. Time until the aircraft would become flyable was unknown.
- Aircraft 58-3022 was crash damaged, and the time until the aircraft would be replaced was unknown.
- Aircraft 58-3023 was flyable but would be grounded in 45 hours flying time for two items.
- Aircraft 58-3026 was flyable but would be grounded in 23 flying hours for a tail rotor hub assembly.
- Aircraft 58-3055 would be grounded in 6 flying hours for a tail rotor hub assembly. The part had been extended and could not be extended further.

The detachment was housed in tentage at the airfield without adequate facilities for storing supplies or performing maintenance. Coordination with Nha Trang Airbase Commander had been made and a site for a permanent hangar type building had been approved. As of 1 October 1962, a request and recommended plans had been submitted but the status was unknown to the 57th.

The detachment was completely non-operational from 17 November to 14 December 1962. This situation was caused by the turn-in of certain aircraft parts for use by another unit. Until 17 November 1962, the detachment had maintained one aircraft at Nha Trang and one aircraft at Qui Nhon. From 14 November 1962 thru the end of the year the detachment had one aircraft flyable, and it was rotated between the two locations.

As of 31 December 1962, the detachment was authorized five aircraft, assigned four aircraft, and had one aircraft flyable. The aircraft status by tail number was:

- Aircraft 50-2081: Prepared for shipment to the continental United States
- Aircraft 50-3023: Prepared for shipment to the continental United States
- Aircraft 58-3026: Prepared for shipment to the continental United States
- Aircraft 58-3035: Flyable

In early November 1962, the detachment orderly room was moved into a bamboo hut which allowed for more room and ease of working conditions than was afforded by a General-Purpose medium tent. The unit supply was still housed in two GP medium tents which did not provide a good working atmosphere nor acceptable security or storage of unit equipment. No further information on the construction of a hangar and other additional workspace for the detachment was available as of 31 December 1962.

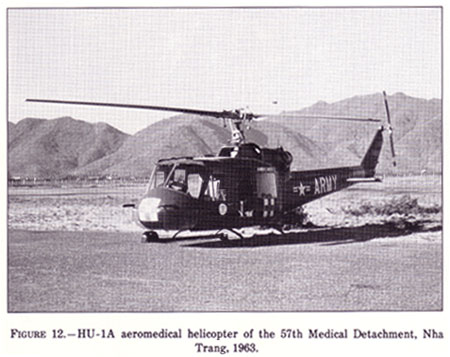
An HU-1A of the 57th Medical Detachment (Helicopter Ambulance) at Nha Trang in 1963

The 57th Medical Detachment (Helicopter Ambulance) had the mission of aeromedical evacuation in support of United States Armed Forces operations in the Republic of Vietnam. This rather vague and all-encompassing definition gave rise to many questions throughout the country as to who exactly would be evacuated and in what priority. The situation was finally clarified on 4 September 1963 with the publication of United States Army Support Group, Vietnam Regulation 59–1. The regulation established the priority as: U.S. military and civilian personnel; members of the Armed Forces of the Republic of Vietnam; and other personnel for humanitarian reasons. This same regulation also established the procedures to be followed for requesting aeromedical evacuation using a standardized nine-line medical evacuation request.

Towards the end of 1963 the fruits of this regulation became apparent as a definite standardized procedure evolved from the positive application of the regulation.

This left the 57th Medical Detachment (Helicopter Ambulance) responsible for aeromedical evacuation in the II, III and IV Corps Tactical Zones within the limits of USASGV Regulation 59–1, while the United States Marine Corps was responsible for aeromedical evacuation within the I Corps Tactical Zone.

The detachment was organized under Table of Organization and Equipment 8-500C with Change 2. The authorized strength of the detachment was 7 officers and 22 enlisted. The Commanding General of the U.S. Army Support Group, Vietnam authorized an increase in unit strength from 7 to 10 officers. This was due to the requirement to have two aviators per aircraft when flying in the Republic of Vietnam. A request to modify the unit TO&E had also been submitted.

Beginning in late January 1963, operational support was provided from three separate bases in the country. The headquarters section with three aircraft was located at Tan Son Nhut Airbase in Saigon. Another section was located in the seacoast town of Qui Nhon with one aircraft, while the third section was located inland of Qui Nhon at Pleiku in the central highlands.

The headquarters section supported operations in the III and IV Corps Tactical Zones, while operations in the II Corps Tactical Zone was provided by the sections in Qui Nhon and Pleiku. The two separate locations in the II Corps Tactical Zone were required due to the large geographic area and the rugged mountains in the highlands. The relocation of aircraft was required due to increased Viet Cong activity in the IV Corps Tactical Zone.

in March 1963, a changeover of the detachment's aircraft occurred, with the unit's UH-1As being replaced with UH-1Bs.

The unit remained assigned to the 8th Field Hospital and under the operational control of the U.S. Army Support Group, Vietnam.

The detachment operated at under TOE strength until April, when an Infantry officer was assigned to augment the crew at Qui Nhon.

In June, that officer was released and three new officers from the Combat arms were assigned on Verbal Orders of the Commanding General, U.S. Army Support Command, Vietnam to bring the detachment's total officer strength to ten. One was an Infantry officer, the second an Armor officer, and the third a Warrant Officer aviator.

In October the Warrant Officer rotated home and was replaced by an Armor officer.

Throughout 1963, the enlisted strength of the detachment hovered around the TO&E authorized strength of 23.

Extensive scheduled training operations as understood in most army circles were not included in the detachment's yearly plan from the time they began operations in 1962 until they began training the Republic of Vietnam Air Force in Medical Evacuation Operations in 1970. There were two basic reasons for this. First, the realization that the entire deployment in Vietnam was a continual practical exercise, and second the desire to keep non-essential flights to an absolute minimum. Training focused on pilot and crew preparation and certification for their duties, such as Pilot in Command, Instructor Pilot, and so on, or training in new systems.

Maintenance support for the detachment's organic aircraft remained above the army's stated minimum goal of 68% aircraft availability during 1963, despite the detachment's heavy workload of 2,094 flying hours for the year. This was especially significant since the detachment was designed to operate from one location but was operating from three for the majority of the year. Close coordination with field maintenance units at the locations where aircraft were stationed through the headquarters section at Tan Son Nhut was a dominant factor in maintaining this achievement. However, the crux of all maintenance support rested with the detachment itself and this was where the problems had to be resolved. A heavy work schedule was maintained to keep as many aircraft as possible available for flight. The major burden fell on the two single-ship sections.

Requests for aeromedical evacuation were channeled through both Army (Combat Operations Center) and Air Force (Air Operations Center) communications systems to the 57th Medical Detachment as directed in USASGV Regulation 59–1. Action on these requests then became the responsibility of the commanding officer of the 57th Medical Detachment.

Requests for aeromedical coverage on airmobile assault operations were forwarded directly from the requesting unit to the 57th Medical Detachment, and the 57th's detachment commander would coordinate with the assaulting unit's chain of command on the mission. The 57th Medical Detachment had, upon request, covered every major operation in the Republic of Vietnam. This coverage was provided by sending one aircraft to the staging area to the assault staging area to either fly with the assault unit or stand by in the staging area. This made immediate response in the area of the assault possible.

During 1963, night medical evacuation had become a regular service of the detachment and by the end of the year was considered its forte. Due to both the detachment's experience and willingness to fly at night most requests for night evacuations came straight to the detachment. An aircraft and crew—a pilot in command, pilot, crew chief, and medic—at all three locations was continually made available for night operations.

Since it was the detachment's policy to accept all legitimate requests for aeromedical evacuation whether day or night, the unit was, de facto, available for aeromedical evacuations on a 24-hour basis.

Major evacuation for U.S. casualties was provided in the Saigon area. These patients were brought directly to the Tan Son Nhut airfield whenever feasible. On assault operation coverage, medical aid was usually first administered to the casualty by the Medical Corps officer that accompanied the assaulting unit into the staging area.

Vietnamese casualties were usually transported to the nearest field hospital. If further evacuation to the rear was requested by Vietnamese medical personnel and was not contrary to USASCV Regulation 59–1, the request was honored.

Patient care as provided by the 57th Medical Detachment in 1963 consisted mainly of in-flight and emergency medical treatment. Many times, this treatment was the very first the casualty received and consequently turned out to be a definite lifesaving step. The flight medic also provided limited first aid to patients waiting in the staging areas for further rearward evacuation when time permitted.

Throughout the war, although medical evacuation of patients constituted the major workload for the detachment, there were considerable missions in other areas. Aeromedical evacuation helicopters provided coverage for armed and troop transport helicopters during combat heliborne assaults, U.S. Air Force defoliation missions, training parachute jumps, convoys of troop and equipment carrying vehicles, and transport of key medical personnel and emergency medical material.

Of the many problems evolving from the operation of any unit, there is one that usually stands before all others. The foible that plagued the 57th Medical Detachment was that of providing total aeromedical coverage to both American and Vietnamese combatants and noncombatants in the Republic of Vietnam. Although the Vietnamese were responsible for evacuating their own casualties, many contingencies came into play that prevented them from doing so, such as large numbers of casualties, lack of sufficient aircraft, or large areas to be covered. To better enable the 57th Medical Detachment to provide this vital coverage, it was necessary to split the unit into three operational sections. This resulted in coverage of a greater area, but also resulted in reduced coverage in Saigon and areas further South. However, this was regarded as the lesser of the two operational constraints.

This then was the nature of the problem. As evacuation assets were arrayed in 1963, many of the aviation companies were forced to provide tactical aircraft to supplement aeromedical aircraft whenever helicopter ambulances of the 57th Medical Detachment were not available due to either prior commitments or the restrictions imposed by aircraft maintenance. This condition would be relieved to a great extent by the augmentation of another helicopter ambulance unit. At the end of 1963 a study was in preparation by the United States Army Support Group, Vietnam to evaluate such a proposal.

Another area that caused problems for the 57th Medical Detachment in 1963 was the matter of having to justify the unit's existence to higher headquarters on the basis of yearly flying hours. This was interpreted by the 57th to mean that a unit's worth was solely dependent on the number of hours flown in a given period and not in the actual accomplishments of the unit—for example, the number of patients evacuated or lives saved. This demonstrated that some individuals did not fully understand the real value of having a trained aeromedical evacuation unit available for immediate response to evacuation requests. Since the detachment performed missions for medical evacuation only, the yearly flight time on aircraft depended solely on the number of evacuations requested. Unlike other aviation units, no administrative or logistical missions were performed, and consequently, the detachment's flight time was less than most other units then serving in the Republic of Vietnam. Because of this shortcoming, another study was directed by the U.S. Support Group, Vietnam to determine the feasibility of integrating the 57th Medical Detachment with those of other logistical units for the purpose on increasing its effectiveness.

The last problem area identified in 1963 that was worth of mention was that concerning maintenance. As mentioned above, the problem was a result of operating from three distinct sections at Qui Nhon, Pleiku, and Saigon. To maintain a flyable aircraft at all times in all sections required more man hours than if the aircraft were concentrated in one location. Thus, a heavier than normal schedule was required by the maintenance personnel at all locations. Despite this, at times no amount of manpower could an aircraft flyable and in this case another aircraft would have to be borrowed from a unit in the immediate vicinity, The limitations on this type of arrangement are readily apparent. The detachment's recommended solution was the deployment of a second air ambulance detachment to Vietnam and the concentration of the 57th's aircraft at one location.

During its first year in country, the 57th worked without a tactical call sign, simply using "Army" and the tail number of the aircraft. For example, if a pilot were flying a helicopter with the serial number 62-12345, his call sign would be "Army 12345". The 57th communicated internally on any vacant frequency it could find. Major Lloyd Spencer, the 57th's second detachment commander in Vietnam, decided that this improvised system needed to be replaced by something more formal. He visited the Navy Support Activity, Saigon, which controlled all the call signs in South Vietnam. He received a Signal Operations Instructions book that listed all the unused call signs. Most, like "Bandit", were more suitable for assault units than for medical evacuation units. But one entry, "Dust Off", epitomized the 57th's medical evacuation missions. Since the countryside then was dry and dusty, helicopter pickups in the fields often blew dust, dirt, blankets, and shelter halves all over the men on the ground. By adopting "Dust Off", Spencer found for Army aeromedical evacuation in Vietnam a name that lasted the rest of the war.

Although unit callsigns at the time were rotated periodically to preserve operations security, it was determined that having a fixed callsign for medical evacuation—and a fixed frequency—would be more advantageous for medical evacuation operations, and so the 57th's callsign was not changed as it normally would have been at the end of the period for the Signal Operations Instructions.

January 1964 found the 57th Medical Detachment located at Tan Son Nhut airport, Saigon. Two air ambulances and crews were attached to the 52d Aviation Battalion, with one helicopter and crew each located at Pleiku and Qui Nhon to provide aeromedical evacuation support within the II Corps area. The remaining three air ambulances and personnel were attached to the 45th Transportation Battalion at Tan Son Nhut providing aeromedical evacuation support within the III and IV Corps areas.

The mission of the detachment was to provide aeromedical evacuation support to U.S. Forces in the Republic of Vietnam and aeromedical evacuation assistance to the Republic of Vietnam as requested. Before the month of January ended the unit was detached from the 145th Aviation Battalion (previously the 45th Transportation Battalion) and attached to Headquarters Detachment, United States Army Support Group, Vietnam. As a result of the new attachment to Headquarters Detachment, U.S. Army Support Group, Vietnam, the unit enlisted personnel moved into new quarters in the Support Group Compound.

During the latter part of February consideration was given to relocating the Flight Section in the II Corps area to the IV Corps area because of increased activity in the lower Mekong Delta. This trend of increased activity in IV Corps continued and consequently on 1 March, Detachment A, 57th Medical Detachment (Helicopter Ambulance), (Provisional), was organized and stationed at Sóc Trăng Airfield with attachment to the Delta Aviation Battalion. This reorganization and relocation placed two aircraft with crews in Soc Trang with the remaining aircraft and personnel located at Tan Son Nhut. A sharp increase in the number of patients evacuated during the month of March demonstrated that the relocation was well justified. The increase of patients evacuated in March initiated an upward trend that reached a peak in July with 768 patients evacuated.

With the upward trend in flight time, patients evacuated, and missions flown there was also a corresponding undesirable upward trend in the number of aircraft hit by enemy fire. On 3 April 1964, First Lieutenant Brian Conway had the dubious distinction of being the first Medical Service Corp Aviator to be wounded in action in Vietnam. A .30-caliber round passed through his ankle as he terminated an approach into a field location for a patient pick-up. This wound resulted in Lt. Conway's evacuation to the United States.

Other statistics which reflected an upward trend during the spring and early summer of 1964 were night flying time and missions. The evacuation of patients at night became routine. These missions were accomplished with a single helicopter flying blackout. It was interesting to note that throughout the entire year, only one hit was received at night although searching fire was often observed. Much of the success of the detachment's night operations was due to the excellent U.S. Air Force radar coverage of the III and IV Corps area. Paris and Paddy Control consistently placed unit aircraft over the target.

Although the number of Vietnamese casualties rose in 1963, the South Vietnamese military refused to set up its own aeromedical evacuation unit. The VNAF response to requests for medical evacuation depended on aircraft availability, the security of the landing zone, and the mood and temperament of the VNAF pilots. If the South Vietnamese had no on-duty or standby aircraft ready to fly a medical evacuation mission, they passed the request on to the 57th. Even when they accepted the mission themselves, their response usually suffered from a lack of leadership and poor organization. Since South Vietnamese air mission commanders rarely flew with their flights, the persons responsible for deciding whether to abort a mission often lacked the requisite experience. As a MACV summary said: "Usually the decision was made to abort, and the air mission commander could do nothing about it. When an aggressive pilot was in the lead ship, the aircraft came through despite the firing. American advisers reported that on two occasions only the first one or two helicopters landed; the rest hovered out of reach of the wounded who needed to get aboard."

An example of the poor quality of VNAF medical evacuation occurred in late October 1963, when the ARVN 2d Battalion, 14th Regiment, conducted Operation LONG HUU II near O Lac in the Delta. At dawn the battalion began its advance. Shortly after they moved out, the Viet Cong ambushed them, opening fire from three sides with automatic weapons and 81 -mm. mortars. At 0700 casualty reports started coming into the battalion command post. The battalion commander sent his first casualty report to the regimental headquarters at 0800: one ARVN soldier dead and twelve wounded, with more casualties in the paddies. He then requested medical evacuation helicopters. By 0845 the casualty count had risen to seventeen lightly wounded, fourteen seriously wounded, and four dead. He sent out another urgent call for helicopters. The battalion executive officer and the American adviser prepared two landing zones, one marked by green smoke for the seriously wounded and a second by yellow smoke for the less seriously wounded. Not until 1215 did three VNAF H-34's arrive over O Lac to carry out the wounded and dead. During the delay the ARVN battalion stayed in place to protect their casualties rather than pursue the retreating enemy. The American adviser wrote later: "It is common that, when casualties are sustained, the advance halts while awaiting evacuation. Either the reaction time for helicopter evacuation must be improved, or some plan must be made for troops in the battalion rear to provide security for the evacuation and care of casualties."

The ARVN medical services also proved inadequate to handle the large numbers of casualties. In the Delta, ARVN patients were usually taken to the Vietnamese Provincial Hospital at Can Tho. As the main treatment center for the Delta, it often had a backlog of patients. At night only one doctor was on duty, for the ARVN medical service lacked physicians. If Dustoff flew in many casualties, that doctor normally treated as many as he could; but he rarely called in any of his fellow doctors to help. In return they would not call him on his night off. Many times at night Dustoff pilots would have to make several flights into Can Tho. On return flights the pilots often found loads of injured ARVN soldiers lying on the landing pad where they had been left some hours earlier. After several such flights few pilots could sustain any enthusiasm for night missions.

Another problem was that the ARVN officers sometimes bowed to the sentiments of their soldiers, many of whom believed that the soul lingers between this world and the next if the body is not properly buried. They insisted that Dustoff ships fly out dead bodies, especially if there were no seriously wounded waiting for treatment. Once, after landing at a pickup site north of Saigon, a Dustoff crew saw many ARVN wounded lying on the ground. But the other ARVN soldiers brought bodies to the helicopter to be evacuated first. As the soldiers loaded the dead in one side of the ship, a Dustoff medical corpsman pulled the bodies out the other side. The pilot stepped out of the helicopter to explain in halting French to the ARVN commander that his orders were to carry out only the wounded. But an ARVN soldier manning a .50-caliber machine gun on a nearby armored personnel carrier suddenly pointed his weapon at the Huey. This convinced the Dustoff crew to fly out the bodies. They carried out one load but did not return for another.

Early in 1964 the growing burden of aeromedical evacuation fell on the 57th's third group of new pilots, crews, and maintenance personnel. The helicopters were still the 1963 UH-1B models, but most of the new pilots were fresh from flight school. Kelly was described as "a gruff, stubborn, dedicated soldier who let few obstacles prevent him from finishing a task." Within six months he set an example of courage and hard work that Dustoff pilots emulated for the rest of the war, and into the 21st Century.

Kelly quickly took advantage of the 57th's belated move to the fighting in the south. On 1 March 1964 the U.S. Army Support Group, Vietnam ordered the aircraft at Pleiku and Qui Nhon to move to the Delta. Two helicopters and five pilots, now called Detachment A, 57th Medical Detachment (Helicopter Ambulance), Provisional, flew to the U.S. base at Soc Trang. Once a fighter base for both the French and the Japanese, Soc Trang was a compound roughly 1,000 by 3,000 feet, surrounded by rice paddies.

Unit statistics soon proved the wisdom of the move south: the number of Vietnamese evacuees climbed from 193 in February to 416 in March. Detachment A continued its coverage of combat in the Delta until October 1964, when the 82nd Medical Detachment (Helicopter Ambulance) from the States took over that area. Major Kelly, who had taken command of the 57th on 11 January, moved south with Detachment A, preferring the field and flying to ground duty in Saigon.

Detachment A in Soc Trang lived in crude "Southeast Asia" huts with sandbags and bunkers for protection against enemy mortar and ground attack. The rest of the 57th in Saigon struggled along with air conditioning, private baths, a mess hall, and a bar in their living quarters. In spite of the contrast, most pilots preferred Soc Trang. It was there that Major Kelly and his pilots forged the Dustoff tradition of valorous and dedicated service.

Kelly and his teams also benefited from two years of growing American involvement in Vietnam. By the spring of 1964 the United States had 16,000 military personnel in South Vietnam (3,700 officers and 12,300 enlisted men). The Army, which accounted for 10,100 of these, had increased its aircraft in South Vietnam from 40 in December 1961 to 370 in December 1963. For the first time since its arrival two years ago the 57th was receiving enough Dustoff requests to keep all its pilots busy.

Kelly faced one big problem when he arrived: the helicopters that the 57th had received the year before were showing signs of age and use, and Brigadier General Joseph Stilwell Jr., the Support Group commander, could find no new aircraft for the detachment. Average flight time on the old UH-1Bs was 800 hours. But this did not deter the new pilots from each flying more than 100 hours a month in medical evacuations. Some of them stopped logging their flight time at 140 hours, so that the flight surgeon would not ground them for exceeding the monthly ceiling.

The new team continued and even stepped-up night operations. In April 1964, the detachment flew 110 hours at night while evacuating ninety-nine patients. To aid their night missions in the Delta the pilots made a few special plotting flights, during which they sketched charts of the possible landing zones, outlined any readily identifiable terrain features, and noted whether radio navigational aid could be received. During one such flight Major Kelly and his copilot heard on their radio that a VNAF T-28, a fixed-wing plane, had gone down. After joining the search, Kelly soon located the plane. While he and his crew circled the area trying to decide how to approach the landing zone, the Viet Cong below opened fire on the helicopter. One round passed up through the open cargo door and slammed into the ceiling. Unfazed, Kelly shot a landing to the T-28, taking fire from all sides. Once down, he, his crew chief, and his medic jumped out and sprayed submachine gun fire at the Viet Cong while helping the VNAF pilot destroy his radios and pull the M60 machine guns from his plane. Kelly left the area without further damage and returned the VNAF pilot to his unit. Kelly and his Dustoff crew flew more than 500 miles that day.

On 2 April one of the Detachment A crews flying to Saigon from Soc Trang received a radio call that a village northwest of them had been overrun. Flying up to the area where the Mekong River flows into South Vietnam from Cambodia, they landed at the village of Cai Cai, where during the night Viet Cong had killed or wounded all the people. Soldiers lay at their fighting positions where they had fallen, women and children where they had been shot. The Dustoff teams worked the rest of the day flying out the dead and wounded, putting two or three children on each litter.

One night that spring Detachment A pilots Capt. Patrick Henry Brady and 2d Lt. Ernest J. Sylvester were on duty when a call came in that an A1-E Skyraider, a fixed-wing plane, had gone down near the town of Rach Gia. Flying west to the site, they radioed the Air Force radar controller, who guided them to the landing zone and warned them of Viet Cong antiaircraft guns. As the Dustoff ship drew near the landing zone, which was plainly marked by the burning A1-E, the pilot of another nearby Al-E radioed that he had already knocked out the Viet Cong machine guns. But when Brady and Sylvester approached the zone the Viet Cong opened fire. Bullets crashed into the cockpit and the pilots lost control of the aircraft. Neither was seriously wounded and they managed to regain control and hurry out of the area. Viet Cong fire then brought down the second Al-E. A third arrived shortly and finally suppressed the enemy fire, allowing a second Dustoff ship from Soc Trang to land in the zone. The crew chief and medical corpsman found what they guessed was the dead pilot of the downed aircraft, then found the pilot of the second, who had bailed out, and flew him back to Soc Trang.

A short time later Brady accompanied an ARVN combat assault mission near Phan Thiet, northeast of Saigon. While Brady's Dustoff ship circled out of range of enemy ground fire, the transport helicopters landed and the troops moved out into a wooded area heavily defended by the Viet Cong. The ARVN soldiers immediately suffered several casualties and called for Dustoff. Brady's aircraft took hits going into and leaving the landing zone, but he managed to fly out the wounded. In Phan Thiet, while he was assessing the damage to his aircraft, an American adviser asked him if he would take ammunition back to the embattled ARVN unit when he returned for the next load of wounded. After discussing the propriety of carrying ammunition in an aircraft marked with red crosses, Brady and his pilots decided to consider the ammunition as "preventive medicine" and fly it into the LZ for the ARVN troops. Back at the landing zone Brady found that Viet Cong fire had downed an L-19 observation plane. Brady ran to the crash site, but both the American pilot and the observer had been killed. The medical corpsman and crew chief pulled the bodies from the wreckage and loaded them on the helicopter. Brady left the ammunition and flew out with the dead.

By the time the helicopter had finished its mission and returned to Tan Son Nhut, most of the 57th were waiting. News of an American death traveled quickly in those early days of the war. Later, reflecting on the incident, Kelly praised his pilots for bringing the bodies back even though the 57th's mission statement said nothing about moving the dead. But he voiced renewed doubts about the ferrying of ammunition.

Brady later explained what actually happened behind the scenes. Upon landing, Brady was met by Kelly and called aside. Expecting to be sternly counseled, Brady was surprised when Kelly simply asked why he had carried in ammunition and carried out the dead. Brady replied that the ammunition was "preventive medicine" and that the dead "were angels", and he couldn't refuse them. Kelly simply walked back to the group involved in that day's missions and told them that it was the type of mission he wanted the 57th to be flying. Brady realized the significance of Kelly's statement, as Kelly would be responsible for any fallout from Brady's actions.

In fact, the Dustoff mission was again under attack. When Support Command began to pressure the 57th to place removable red crosses on the aircraft and begin accepting general purpose missions, Kelly stepped up unit operations. Knowing that removable red crosses had already been placed on transport and assault helicopters in the north, Kelly told his men that the 57th must prove its worth-and by implication the value of dedicated medical helicopters-beyond any shadow of doubt.

While before the 57th had flown missions only in response to a request, it now began to seek missions. Kelly himself flew almost every night. As dusk came, he and his crew would depart Soc Trang and head southwest for the marshes and Bac Lieu, home of a team from the 73d Aviation Company and detachments from two signal units, then further south to Ca Mau, an old haunt of the Viet Minh, whom the French had never been able to dislodge from its forested swamps. Next, they would fly south almost to the tip of Ca Mau Peninsula, then at Nam Can reverse their course toward the Seven Canals area. After a check for casualties there at Vi Thanh, they turned northwest up to Rach Gia on the Gulf of Siam, then on to the Seven Mountains region on the Cambodian border. From there they came back to Can Tho, the home of fourteen small American units, then up to Vinh Long on the Mekong River, home of the 114th Aviation Company (Airmobile Light). Finally, they flew due east to Truc Giang, south to the few American advisers at Phu Vinh, then home to Soc Trang. The entire circuit was 720 kilometers.

If any of the stops had patients to be evacuated, Kelly's crew loaded them on the aircraft and continued on course, unless a patient's condition warranted returning immediately to Soc Trang. After delivering the patients, they would sometimes resume the circuit. Many nights they carried ten to fifteen patients who otherwise would have had to wait until daylight to receive the care they needed. In March, this flying from outpost to outpost, known as "scarfing", resulted in seventy-four hours of night flying that evacuated nearly one-fourth of that month's 448 evacuees. The stratagem worked; General Stilwell dropped the idea of having the 57th use removable red crosses.

Although most of Dustoff's work in the Delta was over flat, marshy land, Detachment A sometimes had to work the difficult mountainous areas near the Cambodian border. Late on the afternoon of 11 April Kelly received a mission request to evacuate two wounded ARVN soldiers from Phnom Kto Mountain of the Seven Mountains of An Giang Province. When he arrived he found that the only landing zone near the ground troops was a small area surrounded by high trees below some higher ground held by the Viet Cong. Despite the updrafts common to mountain flying, the mists, and the approaching darkness, Kelly shot an approach to the area. The enemy opened fire and kept firing until Kelly's ship dropped below the treetops into the landing zone. Kelly could set the aircraft down on only one skid; the slope was too steep. Since only one of the wounded was at the landing zone, Kelly and his crew had to balance the ship precariously while waiting for the ARVN troops to carry the other casualty up the mountain. With both patients finally on board, Kelly took off and again flew through enemy fire. The medical corpsman promptly began working on the Vietnamese, one of whom had been wounded in five places. Both casualties survived.

When Kelly flew such a mission he rarely let bad weather darkness, or the enemy stop him from completing it. He fought his way to the casualties and brought them out. On one mission the enemy forced him away from the landing zone before he could place the patients on board. An hour later he tried to land exactly the same way, through enemy fire, and this time he managed to load the patients safely. The Viet Cong showed their indifference to the red crosses on the aircraft by trying to destroy it with small arms, automatic weapons, and mortars, even while the medical corpsman and crew chief loaded the patients. One round hit the main fuel drain valve and JP-4 fuel started spewing. Kelly elected to fly out anyway, practicing what he had preached since he arrived in Vietnam by putting the patients above all else and hurrying them off the battlefield. He radioed the Soc Trang tower that his ship was leaking fuel and did not have much left, and that he wanted priority on landing. The tower operator answered that Kelly had priority and asked whether he needed anything else. Kelly said, "Yes, bring me some ice cream." just after he landed on the runway the engine quit, fuel tanks empty. Crash trucks surrounded the helicopter. The base commander drove up, walked over to Kelly, and handed him a quart of ice cream.

Apart from the Viet Cong, the 57th's greatest problem at that time was a lack of pilots. After Kelly reached Vietnam he succeeded in having the other nine Medical Service Corps pilots who followed him assigned to the 57th. He needed more, but the Surgeon General's Aviation Branch seemed to have little understanding of the rigors of Dustoff flying. In the spring of 1964 the Aviation Branch tried to have new Medical Service Corps pilots assigned to nonmedical helicopter units in Vietnam, assuming that they would benefit more from combat training than from Dustoff flying.

On 15 June 1964, Kelly gave his response:

"As for combat experience, the pilots in this unit are getting as much or more combat-support flying experience than any unit over here. You must understand that everybody wants to get into the Aeromedical Evacuation business. To send pilots to U.T.T. [the Utility Tactical Transport Helicopter Company, a nonmedical unit] or anywhere else is playing right into their hands. I fully realize that I do not know much about the big program, but our job is evacuation of casualties from the battlefield. This we are doing day and night, without escort aircraft, and with only one ship for each mission. Since I have been here we have evacuated 1800 casualties and in the last three months we have flown 242.7 hours at night. No other unit can match this. The other [nonmedical] units fly in groups, rarely at night, and always heavily armed."

He continued:

"If you want the MSC Pilots to gain experience that will be worthwhile, send them to this unit. It is a Medical Unit and I don't want to see combat arms officers in this unit. I will not mention this again. However, for the good of the Medical Service Corps Pilots and the future of medical aviation I urge you to do all that you can to keep this unit full of MSC Pilots."

In other words, Kelly thought that his unit had a unique job to do and that the only effective training for it could be found in the cockpit of a Dustoff helicopter.

Perhaps presciently, Kelly closed his letter as follows:

"Don't go to the trouble of answering this letter for I know that you are very busy. Anyhow, everything has been said. I will do my best, and please remember 'Army Medical Evacuation FIRST'."

With more and more fighting occurring in the Delta and around Saigon, the 57th could not always honor every evacuation request. U.S. Army helicopter assault companies were forced to keep some of their aircraft on evacuation standby, but without a medical corpsman or medical equipment. Because of the shortage of Army aviators and the priority of armed combat support, the Medical Service Corps did not have enough pilots to staff another Dustoff unit in Vietnam. Most Army aeromedical evacuation units elsewhere already worked with less than their permitted number of pilots. Although Army aviation in Vietnam had grown considerably since 1961, by the summer of 1964 its resources fell short of what it needed to perform its missions, especially medical evacuation.

Army commanders, however, seldom have all the men and material they can use, and Major Kelly knew that he had to do his best with what he had.

Kelly had begun to realize that, although he preferred flying and being in the field to Saigon, he could better influence things by returning to Tan Son Nhut. After repeated requests from Brady, Kelly told him that he would relinquish command of Detachment A of the 57th at Soc Trang to Brady on 1 July and return to Saigon—although he then later told Brady he was extending his stay in the Delta for at least another month.

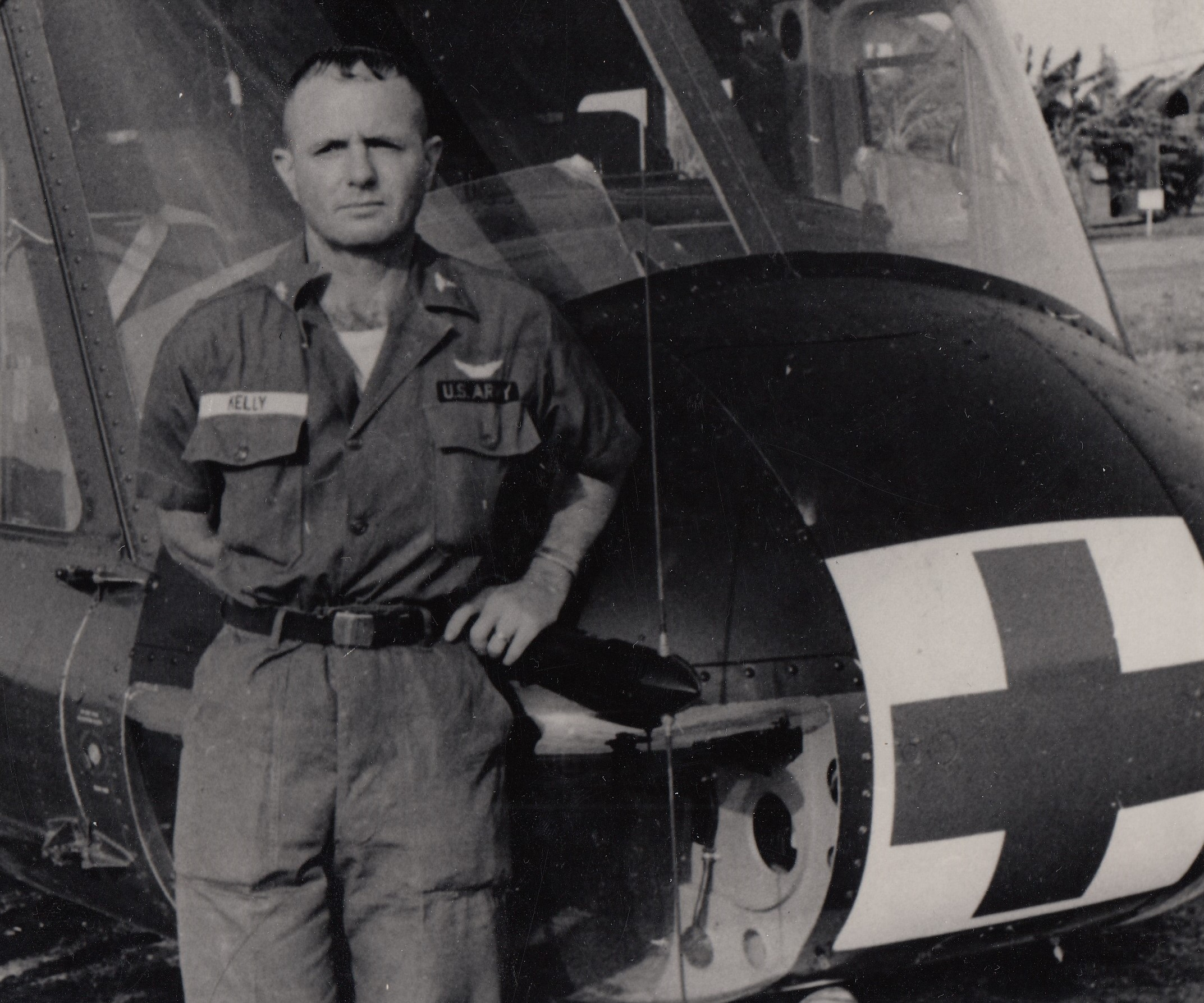
Major Charles L. Kelly, commander of the 57th Medical Detachment, was killed in action on 1 July 1964

The second half of the year began with the sad event of the death of the detachment commander, Major Charles L. Kelly on 1 July 1964. He was struck in the chest by a Viet Cong bullet while attempting a patient pick-up. The aircraft crashed with the other three crewmembers receiving injuries. His dying words, "When I have your wounded," would become both a creed and rallying cry for both the 57th and all other Dustoff units to follow them.

Captain Paul A. Bloomquist assumed command of the detachment and remained as commander until the arrival of Major Howard A. Huntsman Jr. on 12 August.

Evacuation workload began a downward toward trend in August from the high reached in July. September showed a slight gain over August, but the trend downward continued for the remainder of the year. Two factors were pertinent in the downward trend. First, the Vietnamese Air Force began playing an increasing role in the evacuation of Vietnamese patients. Although the evacuation of Vietnamese personnel was a secondary mission this in reality constituted the major portion of the workload for the 57th. The second factor was the arrival of the 82d Medical Detachment (Helicopter Ambulance) in October. This detachment was located in Soc Trang. This relieved Detachment A of the 57th and the unit was reconsolidated as a complete unit at Tan Son Nhut on 7 October 1964. This was the first time that the unit had operated from one location in entirety since its arrival in Vietnam.

There was a personnel exchange between the 82nd and the 57th. This involved six officers and was accomplished in order to better distribute rotation dates for the 82d Medical Detachment. Four enlisted personnel were also exchanged. Transferred from the 82d to the 57th were Captain Raymond A. Jackson, Captain Douglas E. Moore, and Lieutenant John J. McGowan. Transferred to the 82nd were Lieutenant Armond C. Simmons, Lieutenant Ernest J. Sylvester, and Lieutenant Bruce C. Zenk.

In October the detachment was relieved from attachment to Headquarters Detachment, U.S. Army Support Command, Vietnam and attached to the 145th Aviation Battalion for rations and quarters. This involved a move of both officer and enlisted personnel into new quarters with the 145th Aviation Battalion. This resulted in an upgrading in living conditions which was appreciated by all.

Although the evacuation of patients was to constitute the major workload for the unit, there was considerable workload in other allied areas. Aeromedical evacuation helicopters of the unit provided medical coverage for armed and troop transport helicopter during air assaults. As a result, the unit has been involved in every air mobile operation in the III Corps area, and in the IV Corps area until relieved of that responsibility by the 82nd MD (HA) in October. Medical coverage was also provided to aircraft engaged in the defoliation mission. This became almost a daily activity in the last few months of the year. Unit aircraft also became involved in many search and rescue missions. This often led to the depressing job of extracting remains from crashed aircraft.

Early in the month of December unit aircraft and crews became engaged in airmobile operation and evacuation missions in the Bình Giã area which was southeast of Saigon. By the end of December operations in this area had expanded to near campaign proportions and unit aircraft were committed on nearly a daily basis. The end of the year 1964 was met with a sense of accomplishment by all unit personnel. The 57th Medical Detachment (Helicopter Ambulance) had performed well and accomplished much.

=== The build-up, 1965–1967 ===
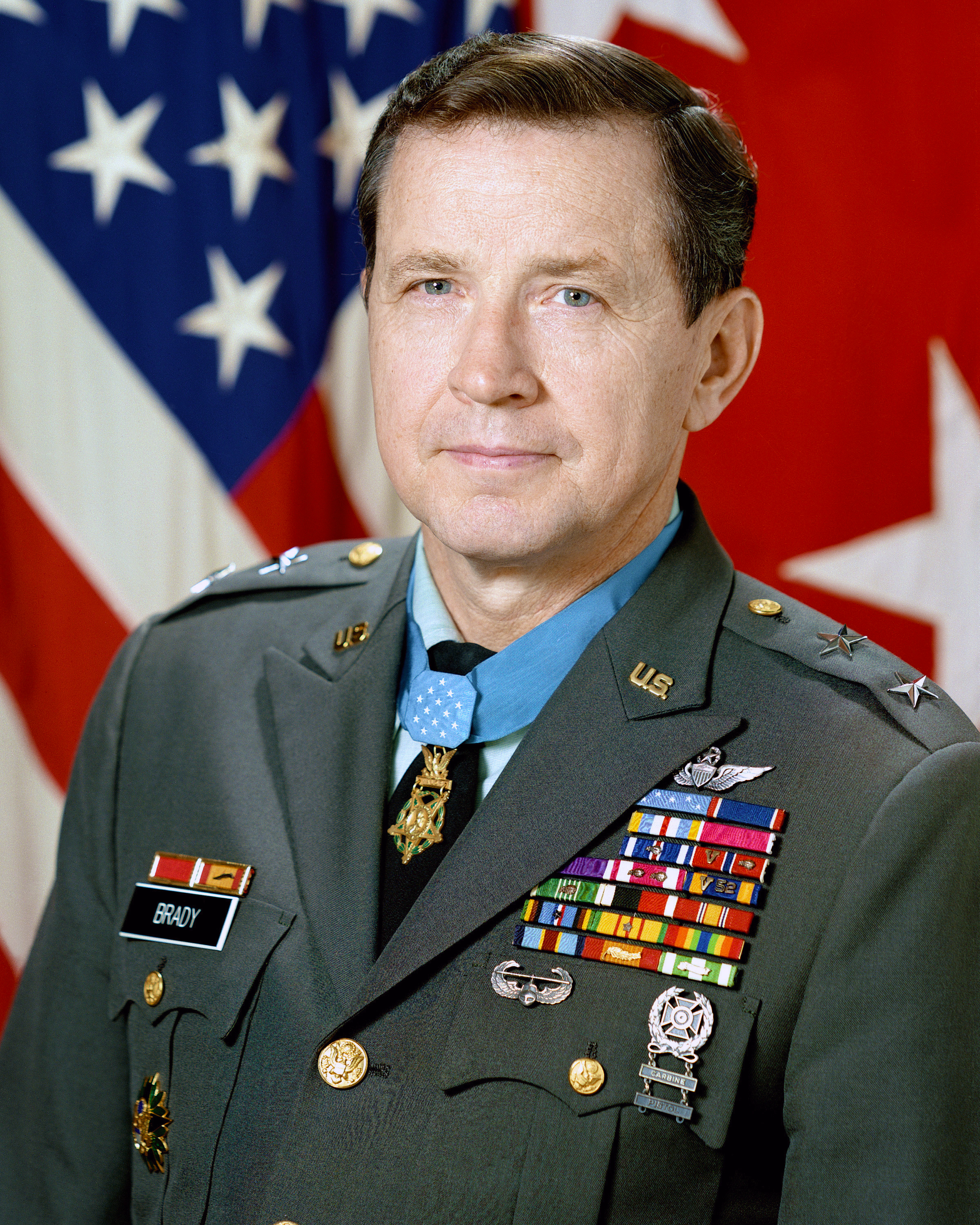
Captain Patrick Henry Brady was assigned as a Medical Evacuation Pilot in the 57th Medical Detachment from January 1964 to January 1965. He would be awarded the Medal of Honor during his second tour in Vietnam.

By 1965, the mission of the 57th Medical Detachment (Helicopter Ambulance) was established as "to provide medical air ambulance support within capabilities to U.S. and Free World Military Assistance Forces (FWMAF) personnel, and back-up service to Republic of Vietnam Air Force (VNAF) personnel as directed within III Corps Tactical Zone, ARVN 7th Division Tactical Zone within the IV Corps Tactical Zone, and back-up support for the 498th Medical Company (Air Ambulance) operating within the II Corps Tactical Zone in coordination with the Commanding Officers of the 254th and 283d Medical Detachments (Helicopter Ambulance)." Their responsibilities included:

1. Providing aeromedical evacuation of patients, including in-flight treatment and/or surveillance, in accordance with established directives, from forward combat elements or medical facilities as permitted by the tactical situation to appropriate clearing stations and hospitals, and between hospitals as required.
2. Providing emergency movement of medical personnel and material, including blood, in support of military operations in zone.

Although the units supported, and the units they coordinated with, would change from year to year, the mission remained essentially unchanged until the detachment redeployed form Vietnam in 1973.

At the end of 1965, the detachment was awaiting approval of its request to be reorganized under TO&E 8-500D which would authorize six UH-1D helicopter ambulances and a corresponding increase in aviator and enlisted personnel. The 8-500C TO&E authorized only 5 aircraft.

General Order Number 75, Headquarters, 1st Logistical Command, dated 13 December 1965, organized the Medical Company (Air Ambulance) (Provisional) and assigned the new company the mission of providing command and control of the 57th Medical Detachment (Helicopter Ambulance) in the aeromedical evacuation support of counterinsurgency operations within the III and IV Corps Tactical Zones. The company was created in response to the obvious need for a command and control headquarters.

The personnel authorized under TO&E 8-500C with Change 2 was augmented by General Order Number 143, Headquarters, U.S. Army Pacific, dated 31 July 1964. This augmentation increased the unit strength by three additional Medical Service Corps Aviators, MOS 1981, which brought the total authorization for the detachment to ten aviators. This allowed the detachment to meet the command requirement that each aircraft have two aviators aboard for each flight. This was considered essential in combat flying and especially so in Vietnam in order that one aviator would be available to take control of the aircraft in the event the other was hit by enemy fire and was not a requirement in the continental United States when the UH-1 was fielded.

Under the reorganization the detachment had pending on 31 December 1965, authorized aviator personnel would increase to eight rotary wing aviators, which would have to be augmented by four additional aviators to meet the command requirement of two aviators per aircraft. A proposed TOE Unit Change Request would be submitted upon reorganization which would increase the total number of authorized aviators to fourteen, providing for a full complement of medical evacuation pilots plus a commander and operations officer.

Enlisted personnel strength remained at a satisfactory level throughout 1965, which was considered an essential factor to the accomplishment of the unit's mission. A full complement of qualified aircraft maintenance personnel and senior medical aidmen was constantly required as they participated in every evacuation flight.

Aircraft maintenance support and availability of spare parts required to maintain unit aircraft in operational status was adequate, considering the increased load placed on both maintenance facilities and aircraft parts because of the influx of aviation units into Vietnam in 1965. Aircraft availability averaged 86% for the year.

Air evacuation of casualties in the Republic of Vietnam was routine in 1965, as highway insecurity and frequent enemy ambushes along traveled routes prohibited evacuation by ground vehicles.

The majority of aeromedical evacuations were accomplished from field locations at or near the place of injury or from forward medical clearing stations. Initial treatment of the patient was normally affected by air ambulance crew and the ground unit's medical personnel. This may have included bandaging, splinting, positioning, airway control, and the administration of a blood expander and/or pain-killer drug, as indicated. Treatment may have been rendered while in the pickup area or in the air. Crewmembers may also have had the task of assigning evacuation priorities in semi-mass casualty situations where a limited number of evacuation aircraft were available for the number of patients involved.

Medical regulating for American patients had become well established with the induction of more qualified medical personnel and well-equipped installations. Patients may have been evacuated to brigade clearing stations, the 3d Surgical Hospital, 93d Evacuation Hospital, 3d Field Hospital, or the Saigon Navy Hospital as dictated by the nature of the patient's wound and patient density at a specific hospital. Coordination between the Surgeon, U.S. Army Vietnam and the Medical Regulating Officer, U.S. Military Assistance Command, Vietnam effectively controlled the balance between in-country facilities.

Vietnamese patients were evacuated to specific hospitals only as dictated by the initial location of the patient in relation to Saigon's Cong Hoa Hospital and a Korean surgical located in Vung Tau. Degree of injury is a factor in medical regulating for Vietnamese patients only when the patient load includes killed in action, who were taken directly to the Tan Son Nhut ARVN Cemetery.

During 1965, the major workload of the unit shifted from the support of the detachment's secondary mission, which had generated the largest activity since the unit arrived in the Republic of Vietnam, to accomplishment of the primary mission, corresponding to the introduction in the Spring of large American combat units.

USARPAC General Order 37, dated 25 February 1966, authorized the 57th Medical Detachment to operate under TO&E 8-500D. This authorized the detachment to augment this TO&E in three areas:

1. The addition of two 1/4-ton vehicles.
2. The substitution of the M16 rifle for the .45 cal. pistol as the new weapon used by the crew members.
3. The addition of six Warrant Officers.

The addition of a Detachment First Sergeant proved to be invaluable. The larger UH-1D aircraft had vastly improved patient evacuation efficiency and crew safety. Carrying more patients on each flight reduced the number of patient transfers and field pick-ups otherwise required by the smaller UH-1B aircraft. Suggested changes to this TO&E were combined by the Helicopter Ambulance Detachments in the III Corps Tactical Zone and were forwarded along with justification by the 436th Medical Detachment (Company Headquarters) (Air Ambulance). A suggested change based on the 57th's recent experience would include the addition of two medical aidmen to provide backup for the six aidmen already assigned to the Helicopter Ambulance detachments. Under the then-existing personnel allocations, when one aidman was sick or on leave, the First Sergeant or an aidman from an allied unit had to fill in for him.

Problems encountered or areas of concern the detachment experienced included:

Area Coverage: Supported units did not understand the concept of area coverage. This term meant that a Dustoff aircraft would respond to an emergency by proximity and speed, and not necessarily in direct support of a specific unit. At the same time, the 57th was in favor of providing as much close-in direct support as possible when the tactical situation requires it, but not at the expense of the Area Coverage concept. In previous years in Vietnam, commanders had utilized Dustoff aircraft in accordance with this Area Coverage concept. However, there was a case under consideration at the end of 1966 which challenged this concept as compared to direct individual unit coverage. The consequences of this problem area became increasingly important as more and more units arrived in South Vietnam. It would be impossible to provide every major commander with an individual Dustoff and still efficiently meet mission requirements in the country. In addition, it was felt that Dustoff operations had been highly successful in the past, and that the 57th could continue to provide a high caliber evacuation system in the future, provided evacuations continue to be administered through medical channels.

Hoist Missions: The S7th Medical Detachment had equipment and trained personnel capable of performing hoist missions when required. However, problems had arisen in this area which deserve mention here. On some occasions ground commanders had requested hoist missions in areas where a suitable landing zone was close by. At other times hoist missions were requested from an area suitable for a helicopter to land in. Also, the inherent dangers of this type of operation, for the aircraft, crew, and patients could not be overemphasized. In almost all cases, it was evident that continued emphasis was needed in this area, especially by ground commanders and individual requesters.

Field Standby: The 57th routinely Supplied a field standby crew for the 196th Light Infantry Brigade at Tay Ninh, and on various occasions had provided crews to the 25th Infantry Division at Cu Chi, the 1st Infantry Division at Lai Khe, and the 4th Infantry Division at Dau Tieng. This close liaison support worked well during 1965, although at times the detachment had been over committed when combat operations (i.e. Operation Attleboro, etc.) required still additional ships in addition to those already at field standby locations. With the tremendous influx of additional units into Vietnam, this field standby support area was likely to become an acute problem in the future, unless the area coverage concept was fully accepted by the supported units.

Early in 1966 the 57th relocated from the Tan Son Nhut Airport to the Saigon Heliport. This move was considered temporary, pending the final move to Long Binh Post, However, this temporary category extended for more than six months and resulted in many operational restrictions within the detachment, such as back-up reaction time and muster capability. As problems mounted with the construction of a heliport at the new location, billets and other facilities at Long Binh Post were erected by individuals of the 57th. It was anticipated that the move to Long Binh would be completed by mid-January 1967, all but eliminating the many problems that arose out of operating in the highly congested city of Saigon.

Aircraft maintenance support and availability of spare parts required to maintain unit aircraft in operational status was adequate, considering the increased load placed on both maintenance facilities and aircraft parts because of the continued influx of aviation units into the Republic of Vietnam. Aircraft availability average for 1966 was 80.5%

General supply support continued to be a problem because of the escalating numbers of U.S. Forces introduced into the combat zone.

Air evacuation of casualties in the Republic of Vietnam was routine, as general insecurity and frequent ambushes along the traveled routes prohibited evacuation by ground.

The majority of aeromedical evacuations were accomplished from field locations at or near the place of injury or from forward medical clearing stations. Initial treatment of the patients were normally performed by the air ambulance crew and the ground unit's medical personnel. This may have included bandaging, splinting, positioning, airway control, application of oxygen and the administration of a blood expander and/or analgesic, as indicated. Treatment may have been rendered while in the pick-up area or in the air. Crew members may also have the task of assigning evacuation priorities in semi-mass casualty situations where limited numbers of evacuation aircraft were available for the number of patients involved.

Medical regulating for U.S. patients was well established by the end of 1966. Patients may be evacuated to brigade clearing stations, Surgical Hospitals, Evacuation Hospitals, and Field Hospitals as directed by the nature of the patient's wound and the patient density at a specific hospital. Coordination between the Surgeon, U.S. Army, Vietnam and the Medical Regulating Officer, U.S. Military Assistance Command, Vietnam effectively controlled the balance between in-country facilities.

Vietnamese patients were evacuated to specific hospitals according to the nature of the injury, proximity of medical facilities, and as directed by initial treatment facility.

During 1966, the major workload of the detachment more than doubled from the patient load generated during 1965. In November, the 57th evacuated more than 1,000 patients for the highest monthly total since arriving in country This tremendous increase in patient load directly corresponded to the increase of American units and combat operations during the year.

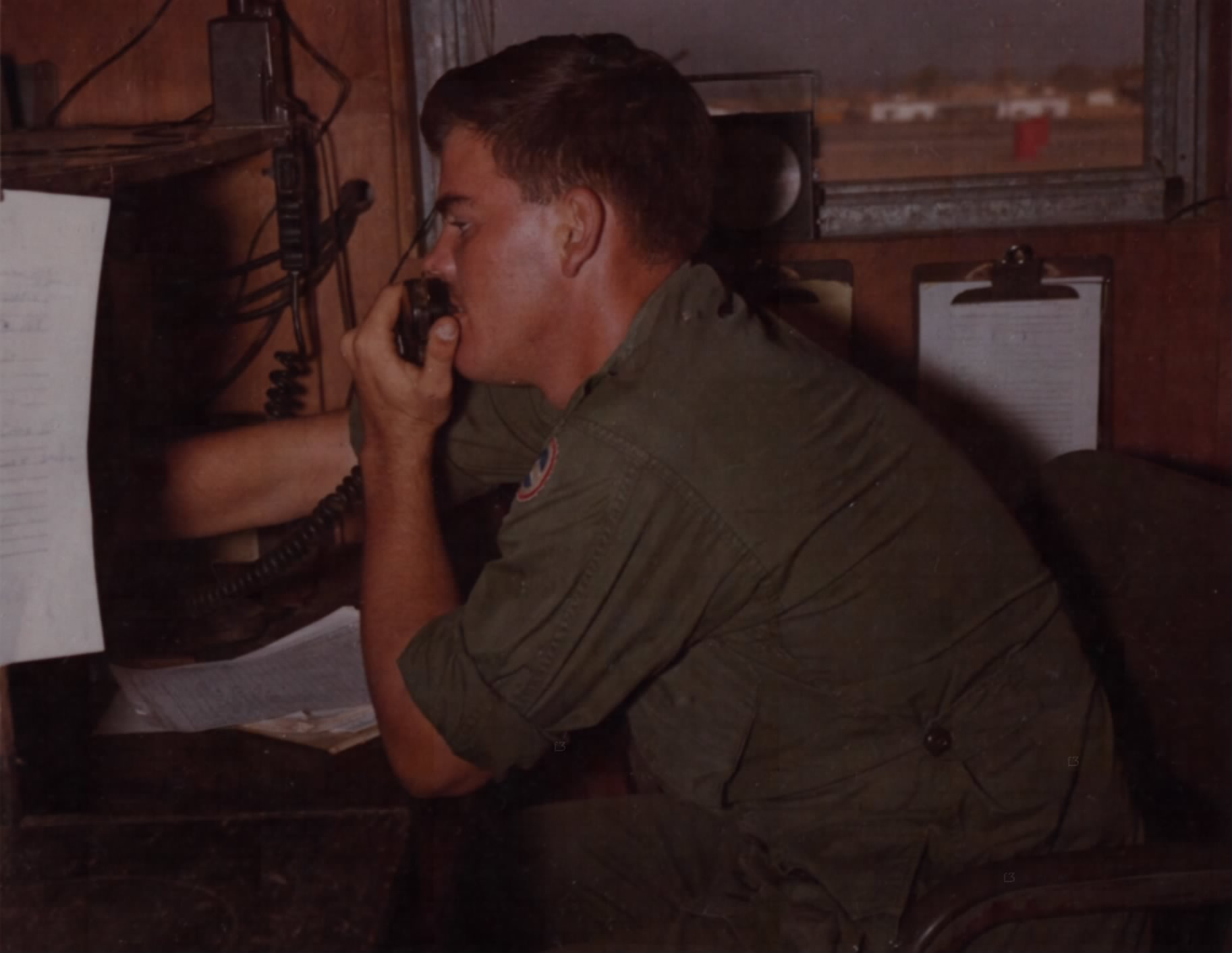
PFC Roger Davis of the 57th Medical Detachment receives a medical evacuation request over the radio, requesting that a soldier be evacuated from the battlefield. The soldier will ultimately be evacuated to the 93d Evacuation Hospital on Long Binh Post, 13 April 1967

The 57th Medical Detachment was organized under TO&E 8-500D implemented by USARPAC General Order number 37 dated 25 February 1966. This was changed by USARPAC General Order number 218, dated 26 October 1967, authorizing the unit to operate under MTOE 8-500D.

From l January to 22 October 1967 the 57th was under the command and control of the 68th Medical Group, 44th Medical Brigade. From 23 October 1967 through the end of 1967 the 57th Medical Detachment was assigned to the 67th Medical Group under the 44th Medical Brigade.

Field Standby: The 57th routinely supplied a field standby crew for 3d Brigade, 25th Infantry Division at Dau Tieng in 1967. This close liaison support worked very well during 1967 and continued to do so through the end of the year. At times the detachment had been heavily committed when combat operations (for example, Operation Yellowstone, Operation Manhattan, and Operation Junction City) required aircraft in addition to those already at field standby locations.

The 57th Medical Detachment successfully completed a move from the Saigon heliport to Long Binh Post in February 1967. The heliport, billets, BOQs and other facilities at Long Binh were erected by the detachment personnel.

The TO&E authorization of 14 aviators was considered adequate. However, the detachment did not have more than 11 aviators assigned at any time for more than short periods. During 1967 the detachment's commitments steadily increased and with casualties and other unforeseen circumstances the assigned aviators were subjected to periods of extremely heavy workload. Although unit aviators did not accumulate high monthly total flying hours in comparison to other aviation units, the medical evacuation mission, (consisting of standby, 24 hours at a time, extensive night flying, periodic extended operations during mass casualty situations, and marginal weather) effectively limited the detachment's ability to schedule a pilot for duty on a continuous basis.

The 57th Medical Detachment received 6 UH-1H aircraft in December equipped with L-13 engines. The 1400 horsepower developed by this engine proved invaluable to the detachment's crews when operating in small, confined areas in the jungle. All the aircraft were equipped with the Decca Navigator System.

Aircraft maintenance support and availability of spare parts required to maintain the detachment's aircraft in operational status was adequate, considering the increased workload placed on both maintenance facilities and aircraft parts because of the influx of aviation units into the Republic of Vietnam. Aircraft availability average for 1967 was an overall 74.8%.

Medical regulating of U.S. patients continued to be well established in 1967. Patients could be evacuated to brigade clearing stations, surgical hospitals, evacuation hospitals, and field hospitals, as directed by the nature of the patient's wound and the patient density at a specific hospital. Coordination between the Medical Regulating Officers of the 44th Medical Brigade and 67th Medical Group effectively controlled the balance between in-country facilities.

During 1967, the increase in the patient load continued to directly correspond to the increase of American units and combat operations during the year.

=== Sustained combat operations, 1968–1969 ===
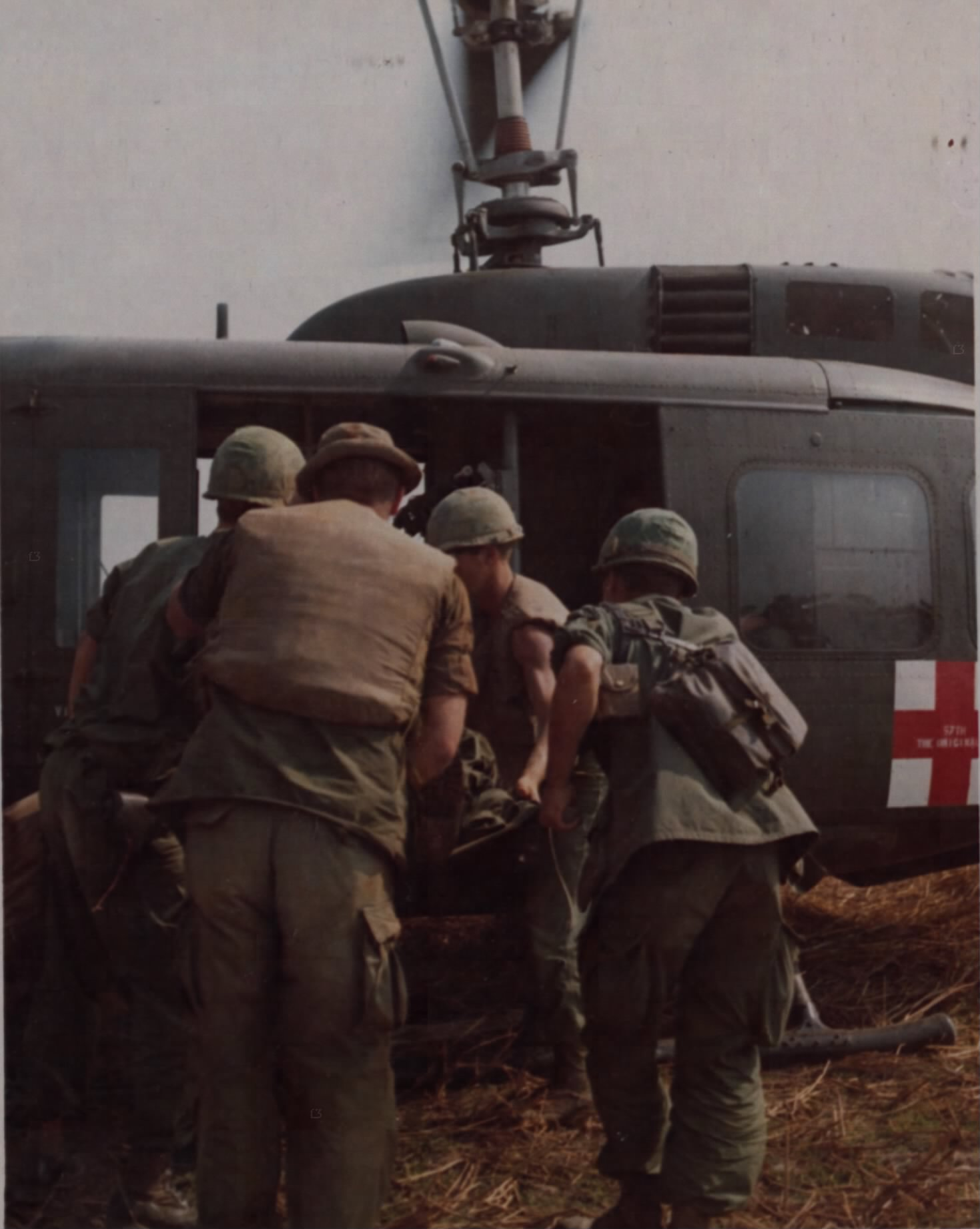
Soldiers of the 3d Brigade, 25th Infantry Division load a wounded soldier aboard an aircraft of the 57th Medical Detachment at Dau Tieng in February 1968. Note the words "The Original Dustoff" stenciled on the red cross on the cargo door

Effective 16 February 1968, the detachment was released from the 67th Medical Group, and assigned to the 68th Medical Group, 44th Medical Brigade, by General Order number 174, dated 14 February 1968. Also effective 16 February 1968, the detachment was attached to the 45th Medical Company (Air Ambulance); 68th Medical Group, by General Order number 17, dated 1 March 1968. The transition was carried out smoothly and without major problems.

The detachment operated under TO&E 8-500D throughout most of 1968. Reorganization took place under Department of the Army General Order number 542, dated 13 September 1968, authorizing the detachment to operate under MTO&E 8-500G effective 2 October 1968. Though it was too early as of the end of 1968 to tell, no foreseeable difficulties were expected under the new TO&E.

In 1968, he 57th Medical Detachment provided coverage to U.S. and Allied Forces operating within their area of responsibility which included III Corps Tactical Zone and the northern part of IV Corps Tactical Zone. The detachment provided a standby crew for its home base at Long Binh Post where it was co-located with the 45th Medical Company (Air Ambulance). In addition, it provided a permanent standby crew at Dau Tieng during the first half of the year; but lost this standby requirement and reverted to providing crews at Saigon, Tan An, Dong Tam and Phan Thiet on a rotational basis with the 45th during the last half of the year. Dustoff operations under this area support concept were extremely effective and were recognized as a tremendous morale factor to all combat troops operating in this area.

The new 1968 TO&E changed the authorized Officer strength from 8 to 4, while the Warrant Officer strength went from 6 to 10. The detachment immediately dropped to 4 Officers to conform to the new TO&E, but with a continuing high quality of Warrant Officers obtained by the detachment, the change was not considered too drastic. Total authorized aviator strength remained at 14, but the detachment had only carried from 11 to 12 throughout the year. The authorized enlisted strength remained at 28, although some changes were made. The detachment gained 1 Senior Helicopter Mechanic, 1 Repair Parts Clerk, and 1 Equipment Records Clerk while losing 1 Aircraft Fuel Specialist, 1 Field Service Specialist, and 1 Radio Telephone Operator. With a large inflow of newly arrived personnel, the detachment was overstrength in enlisted personnel as 1968 drew to a close. All positions were filled throughout most of the year although some individuals were required to work outside of their MOS. This required some additional amount of on-the-job training and understandably caused some difficulties.

The 57th Medical Detachment had six UH-1H aircraft which continued to be a tremendous asset toward accomplishing the detachment's mission. They proved to be durable and highly capable in numerous combat situations. One aircraft was lost during the year due to an accident resulting from a tail rotor failure and was immediately replaced with a new aircraft. Aircraft availability for the year was an overall 76%. Supply and maintenance support, though at times slow, was adequate for the most part.

Air evacuation of casualties proved itself in the Republic of Vietnam as a highly effective means of evacuating patients. The majority of aeromedical evacuations were accomplished from field locations at or near the place of injury. Medical Regulations pertaining to the disposition of U.S. patients was well established by 1968. Patients could be evacuated to clearing stations, surgical stations, surgical hospitals, evacuation hospitals, or field hospitals as dictated by the patient's wound and the patient density at a specific hospital. Coordination with the Medical Groups at the time of evacuation effectively controlled the balance between in-country facilities.

Vietnamese civilian and military personnel could be evacuated to U.S. facilities depending upon the proximity of the various Vietnamese hospitals. Vietnamese hospital quality had improved over 1968 and greater emphasis was placed on evacuating Vietnamese casualties to those hospitals as they became more self-supporting. Life and limb saving procedures could still be undertaken at U.S. facilities if the situation warranted but the majority of those patients were then furtl1er evacuated to Vietnamese hospitals.

Security of landing zones presented problems at times. Security had to be stressed to ground units that even in areas where it may not have seemed necessary, such as "friendly" villages, especially at night. Brief but honest description of the tactical situation given by the ground commanders when applicable prior to landing of the helicopter could often be advantageous.

The Tet Offensive of January - February 1968 tested the capabilities of the detachment to a maximum. The entire detachment met the challenge with determination. Five out of six aircraft remained flyable with the pilots and crews flying steadily on eight-hour shifts around the clock. Most of the time the crews changed without shutting down the aircraft, and during the entire crisis, the unit was able to perform its mission flawlessly.

On 15 February 1969 the detachment relocated from Long Binh Post to Lai Khe, replacing the 4th Flight Platoon, 45th Medical Company (Air Ambulance) due to increased mission requirements in that area. From Lai Khe, it continued throughout the year to support elements of the 1st Infantry Division, the 11th Armored Cavalry Regiment and Army of the Republic of Vietnam (ARVN) Forces operating in the area.

Aircraft maintenance and supply support received from the 605th Transportation Company (Direct Support) was outstanding. Maintenance down time was drastically reduced by technical assistance visits and close maintenance coordination between the detachment and Direct Support element.

=== The drawdown, 1970–1972 ===
On 15 February 1970 the detachment relocated from Lai Khe to Binh Thuy to augment the Dustoff mission in the Military Region IV. From Binh Thuy the detachment supported the ARVN 9th, 21st Divisions and the 44th Special Tactical Zone, and the U.S. and Vietnamese Navies, plus U.S. Advisory Teams.

The Commanding Officer of the 57th Medical Detachment also commanded the 43d Medical Detachment (RB) which provided ground ambulance support on an assigned basis. The 82d Medical Detachment (Helicopter Ambulance) was also under the operational control of the 57th.

A strenuous effort was being made to get the VNAF to perform medical evacuation in Military Region IV. At the end of 1970, there were 3 squadrons of VNAF helicopters in Military Region IV; 2 fully active at Binh Thuy Air Base and 1 at Soc Trang. Senior VNAF officers and USAF advisors revealed a lack of expertise in the area of aeromedical evacuation. Tentative plans were made to provide ground schooling for selectec1 VNAF pilots and then furnish the VNAF with qualified aircraft commanders from the 57th and 82d Medical Detachments to fly combat missions with mixed crews. Considerable interest had been shown by both VNAF and USAF advisors in creating a special unit to conduct medical evacuations.

Some of the problem areas were: Lack of a definitive direction through VNAF channels that the squadrons would perform the mission and the number of aircraft that needed to be tasked for the mission; lack of specific training? in medical evacuation in the VNAF; and communications problems from Military Region IV to the VNAF. At the end of 1970, one officer of the 57th was assigned to draw up training plans for the VNAF and also work on the communication problems.

Aircraft maintenance and supply support received from the 611th Transportation Company (Direct Support) was not satisfactory. Excessive down time and equipment deadlined for parts rates could be traced directly to Direct Support, and higher supporting units.

Updating of existing facilities continued with installation of finished walls, partitions and air conditioning of the detachment orderly room, supply, and operations. All buildings were of permanent type, of either wood or metal construction. Asphalt paving had been accomplished, and steel planking, 80 by 110 feet, had been installed in the aircraft maintenance area through the self-help program.

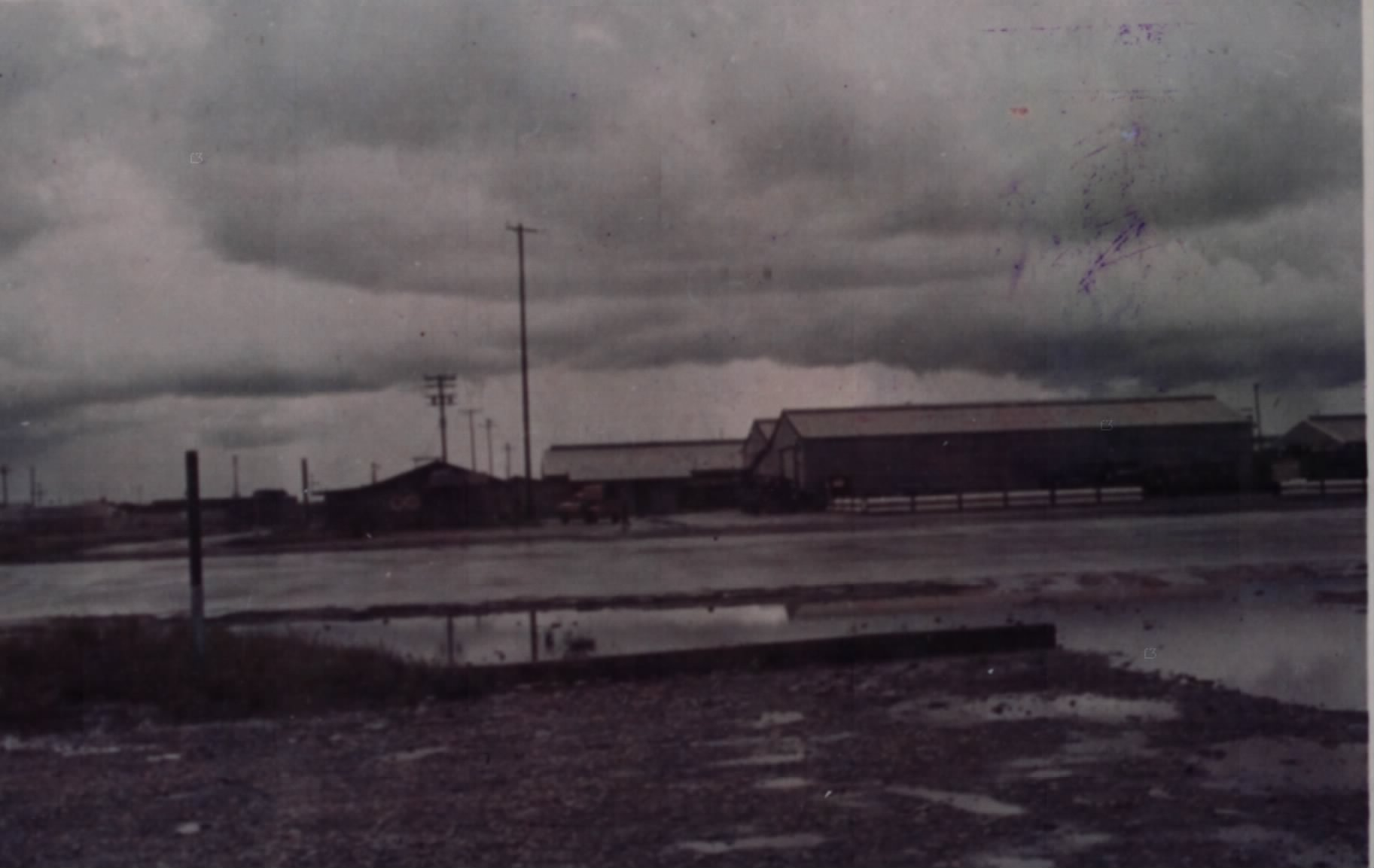
View of the hangar area of the 57th and 82d Medical Detachments—"Delta Dustoff"—at Binh Thuy Air Base, August 1971

The 82d Medical Detachment (Helicopter Ambulance) was under the operational control of the 57th Medical Detachment until 1 November 1971 when the 82d was redeployed to the United States. The 43d Medical Detachment (RB), a ground ambulance detachment which had also been under the operational control of the 57th, was reassigned to the 3d Surgical Hospital in May 1971 for closer coordination of their mission.

From 3 March 1971 to 1 November 1971 the 57th Medical Detachment trained Vietnamese Air Force pilots to perform medical evacuation in Military Region IV. Plans were drawn up out of a meeting with senior VNAF officers, USAF officers, and D.R.A.C. advisors, resulting in a ground school for the Vietnamese pilots and medical aidmen as well as the 57th flying combat missions with the Vietnamese. As of the end of 1971, classes were being planned consisting of a four-week course covering essential medical training for the Vietnamese pilots. The classes had a target date of beginning on 15 January 1972. The course was patterned after the four-week course of instruction being taught at Fort Sam Houston, Texas under the title "Essential Medical Training for AMEDD Aviatiors."

On 10 February 1971 the detachment extended their area of coverage to include the ARVN 7th Division in addition to the 9th and 21st Divisions and the 44th Special Tactical Zones already covered as well as the U.S. and Vietnamese Navies and U.S. Advisory Teams.

The 611th Transportation Company (Direct Support) greatly improved their performance in 1971 over that demonstrated in 1970. During 1971 the 611th had been of great assistance to the detachment in every respect. They gave support not only at their unit facilities, but also provided on-site maintenance and technical assistance whenever it was necessary. They greatly aided the 57th in the accomplishment of the detachment's mission.

Aeromedical evacuation procedures

Night medical evacuation extractions became increasingly hazardous due to the Vietnamese field units not being equipped with necessary signaling devices, such as signaling flares, strobe lights, and so forth.

The Vietnamese command structure was notified of the existing situation, but continued emphasis needed to be placed in this area.

Essential signaling devices, and training in their use for night helicopter operations needed to be made available to units requesting medical evacuation. This problem could be alleviated by attaching specialists equipped to train and utilize this available equipment to various field units.

U.S. and Vietnamese evacuation procedures

With the inception of the integrated flying and cross-training program on 3 March 1971, carried out by U.S. personnel, the program had progressed to the point where the Vietnamese Air Force pilots were accomplishing 85% of the ARVN missions in Military Region IV.

The lack of both English-speaking Vietnamese and Vietnamese-speaking U.S. personnel provided a break of communications between the two forces in radio telephone operations section. The Vietnamese personnel sent missions incorrectly over the air, for example sending frequencies in the clear.

The 57th recommended establishing a separate Vietnamese medical evacuation unit in Military Region IV. At the end of 1971, the necessary cross-trained Vietnamese personnel to establish such a unit were available. This would have served to alleviate communication difficulties and would allow for a separate operation to facilitate Vietnamese Dustoff operations.

Classification of patients

As of the end of 1971, the Vietnamese radiotelephone operators were classifying the Vietnamese patients on a medical evacuation request as either urgent, priority, or routine. This classification was accomplished by word of mouth over the telephone without physically observing the wounded individuals.

With the patient classification being made by detached personnel, many errors were made on the status or urgency of wounded personnel.

All classifications should have been made by medical personnel or the senior ranking individual located with the wounded personnel. Command emphasis needed to be placed there to ensure a more exact classification procedure and, in most instances, speedier response for those who were truly urgent.

U.S. Evacuation Procedures

Many valuable minutes were wasted by going to each U.S. Advisor location, picking up an interpreter (U.S. personnel plus Vietnamese interpreter) for each individual Vietnamese MEDEVAC request in the provinces. There were 16 provinces in Military Region IV with a minimum of four interpreter "backseat" pickups as many as twelve different locations depending on the province concerned. There was virtually no coordination due to a lack of parallel processing by the U.S. personnel of ARVN MEDEVACs.

Missions ran too long due to the requirement to pick up an interpreter for each MEDEVAC where U.S. personnel are not on the ground. This could require picking up twelve different interpreters at twelve different locations for twelve different medical evacuations in a single province, to cite an extreme example.

The 57th recommended that the ARVN establish a Vietnamese officer in charge of coordinating all Vietnamese Dustoff requests for each individual province. This solution would have provided one interpreter for pickup for each province for the MEDEVACs in that province. Coordinating the missions in each province would result.

Establishing a formal Vietnamese dustoff unit

The 57th Medical Detachment had been working since 1 November 1070 toward the Vietnamization of Dustoff in Military Region IV. The following had been directed toward this end:

From 1 November 1970 until 31 December 1970 ground school training was initiated for the Vietnamese pilots and their medics n the procedures of medical evacuation.

On 1 March 1971 the flying program was initiated to test the ground school program initiated by the 57th. For eight months the U.S. aircraft commanders and medics flew over 4,000 hours with VNAF medics and VNAF pilots in order to standardize their approach to medical evacuation in the Mekong Delta. These figures do not reflect in the 57th's overall total for all flying time and patients picked up were logged with VNAF statistics.

From an operational standpoint the 57th had to coordinate and tactfully suggest and push for VNAF higher command support for the Vietnamese Dustoff effort in Military Region IV.

Established Medical Classes—extending to a four-week indoctrination for VNAF pilots who fly Dustoff in order to provide unity to the effort among the Vietnamese pilots and provide impetus to their dedication.

The 57th Medical Detachment loaned equipment and supplies when the Vietnamese Squadron continuously provided minimal support to their Dustoff effort.

Through the efforts of the 57th and 82d Medical Detachments, results were tremendously successful, as illustrated by the fact that the VNAF completed 85% of medical evacuations in the Delta in December 1971.

However, a formal VNAF Dustoff unit could not be created in Military Region IV due to the VNAF system of establishing priorities—that combat assault helicopters must be dedicated before Dustoff aircraft are provided.

A letter was forwarded from the Military Region IV Commanding General to the Commander in Chief of the Vietnamese Armed Forces recommending a formal, dedicated Dustoff unit be created. This met with a negative response.

Though the 57th received some support from the Vietnamese Air Force in supplying aircraft for the Vietnamese Dustoff pilots, emphasis needed to be continued to be placed on a dedicated Vietnamese Dustoff unit.

As an added example, if the Vietnamese Air Force could produce the impressive mission accomplishment figures that they did in the last quarter of 1971 without an operations officer, without consistent guidance and support from the Vietnamese Air Force command structure then common sense allows for accurate prediction of future mission accomplishment if a formal dedicated Vietnamese Dustoff unit were established.

In 1972, the 57th Medical Detachment was organized under MTOE 8-500G, as a six-aircraft, 45-man detachment. Ideally the detachment consisted of four Medical Service Corps Officers, ten warrant officers, and 31 enlisted. For the first three months of 1972 the detachment was based in the Mekong Delta at the Binh Thuy Naval Air Station, where the detachment provided medical evacuation support for Military Region IV. However, due to the dwindling U.S. and FWMAF evacuation mission and the increasing role played by the Dustoff crews of the Vietnamese Air Force, the 57th Medical Detachment was redeployed to Long Binh to join a sister Dustoff unit, the 159th Medical Detachment (Helicopter Ambulance) on 1 April 1972 to form Long Binh Dustoff. These detachments served both Military Regions II and IV, with the 57th Medical Detachment maintaining a one ship standby site at the Can Tho Army Airfield. The two detachments functioned as one unit, with the senior detachment commander serving as the commanding officer. On 15 October 1972 the 159th Medical Detachment was inactivated, its colors returning to Fort Benning, Georgia and the 57th Medical Detachment was again redeployed, this time to Tan Son Nhut Air Base in Saigon.

From the beginning of 1972 until its redeployment to Long Binh Post, the 57th Medical Detachment was responsible for the training of Dustoff crews for the Vietnamese Air Force. Flying with American aircraft commanders, over thirty Vietnamese pilots were trained in this three-month period, becoming remarkably proficient in instrument flying, standardization, night flying, and tactical operations. During this same period the same number of Vietnamese medics and crew chiefs were also trained by the AMerican crew members on actual evacuation missions throughout Military Region IV. The achievement of the 57th Medical Detachment in this program, could not be overstated. As a result of this dedicated training the VNAF Dustoff crews were able to assume their responsibility for providing aeromedical evacuation assistance and support for the ARVN divisions in MR IV well ahead of a planned USARV Vietnamization schedule, thereby allowing the 57th Medical Detachment to redeploy to Long Binh Dustoff in time to offer additional strategic support to the allied forces embattled in the Easter Offensive in the Northwest part of Military Region III. As for the detachment's own training, the 57th Medical Detachment was fortunate enough to have two fine instrument instructor pilots, one a military instrument flight examiner, assigned to the two detachments of Long Binh Dustoff. All of the pilots of the two detachments benefitted tremendously from the ground school classes and training flights conducted by these instructor pilots, but after several months the program was discontinued due to the lack of aircraft that could be made available for training purposes.

Throughout the year, the availability of aircraft parts and related logistics became increasingly harder to procure, and at best the supply of such items could be termed only fair. Vehicle parts were harder to obtain, which often resulted in a low vehicle availability for the detachment.

The two major problems that plagued the 57th Medical Detachment were again a result of the continuing de-escalation of the American forces in Vietnam.

First, due to the dwindling number of missions, the newer pilots and enlisted crew members earned little flight time, thereby preventing them from becoming fully knowledgeable of an extremely large area of operations, as well as from becoming skilled in tactical flying and operations.

Secondly, the aircraft direct support maintenance was contracted to a civilian organization, MHA Field Services. As the 57th Medical Detachment had a low priority for direct support maintenance, aircraft which would normally be grounded for three or four days by military maintenance teams for periodic maintenance and inspections were delayed for as long as three weeks. Nonetheless, the detachment's own maintenance team was able to achieve an availability rate of approximately 85% despite this problem and the fact that aircraft logistical support was considered fair.

A minor problem which continued to arise was the fact that POL stations (refueling points) for the aircraft across Military Regions III and IV were being closed down with the American withdrawal, and flight crews had to take special care to ensure their aircraft were properly refueled for each mission requirement. Inappropriate missions and the overclassification of patients remained continuing dilemmas.

=== Redeployment, 1973 ===
When it redeployed in March 1973, the 57th Medical Detachment (Helicopter Ambulance) had qualified for all 17 campaign streamers that the Army had authorized for service in Vietnam.

This section will explain the areas of stand-down, withdrawal and roll-up for the 57th Medical Detachment (Helicopter Ambulance). Stand-down, as used here, refers to the events and procedures for terminating operations. Withdrawal, as used here, refers to the actual redeployment of personnel. The roll-up phase will cover the transfer or turn-in of unit property.

==== Stand-down phase ====
Planning
With a negotiated settlement to the conflict in the Republic of Vietnam drawing near, the need for a replacement activity for Dustoff was recognized by the U.S. Army Health Services Group, Vietnam (USAHSVCGPV). A contract agreement with Cords Aviation was reached in early January for them to replace the four DUSTOFF units in Vietnam. It was decided that the Cords Aviation corporation personnel would assume the detachment's mission in Military Region IV on X+30 and the mission in Military Region III on X+45. In connection with the Cords responsibilities and to assure a smooth transition, each of the DUSTOFF units would be required to contact their supported units and the Cords representative in their Military Region. The overall coordination responsibility was placed on the operations section of the 57th Medical Detachment.

Taking into consideration the anticipated withdrawal and inactivation it was decided that a fifty percent posture on X+30 was appropriate. This fifty percent status would be reached gradually to insure complete and professional coverage of the detachment's mission. On X+45 the detachment's mission requirements would be terminated, and the remaining assets would be closed. The detachment's field standby would be terminated in two steps. The daily standby in support of the air cavalry units in the 57th's area of operation would be terminated on X-Day as the cavalry units completed their operation. The permanent Can Tho standby would terminate on X+30 as the Cords Aviation assumed the mission.

A mission of great interest and importance was Operation Homecoming. This mission was the detachment's single most important concern, as the intense international interest in the POW releases mounted. Early intelligence indicated the possibility of returnees being released in small groups in remote locations with little prior notice. The detachment's leadership decided to place all personnel on twenty-four-hour alert as the treaty became effective. Each member of the detachment received complete briefings on their duty with concern to Operation Homecoming. As X-Day approached, further intelligence indicated the need to augment the aircraft of the detachment with ships and crews from the 247th Medical Detachment (Helicopter Ambulance), located in Nha Trang. Coordination with the U.S. Army Hospital, Saigon was initiated for means of reporting and delivery of returnees.

Actual events

The contract with Cords Aviation was accepted in late January 1973. Air Operations Offices for Cords Aviation were contacted in each Military Region by the respective DUSTOFF Operations Officers. The purpose of this coordination was to affect a smooth transitioning period, to eliminate possible problem areas and to better understand limitations that would be inherent to such a transfer. With this agreement it was then possible for the DUSTOFF units to proceed with the termination of operations as scheduled.

The termination of the detachment's field standby sites was carried out as planned. The Cavalry Troops in the 57th's area ceased operations on X-Day as planned and so the detachment's daily standby terminated with their requirement. The permanent standby in Can Tho terminated on X+30 as planned and an effective and smooth transition to Cords Aviation was made. As anticipated the withdrawal of troops justified the fifty percent posture on X+30 as planned, however a few problems were encountered (see withdrawal and roll-up phases, below). The fifty percent stand-down was accomplished a little behind schedule but proved appropriate as the detachment's mission decreased sharply as the deactivation period continued. On X+45 the entire operation was terminated, and Cords Aviation assumed the mission with no difficulties.

The 57th Medical Detachment's role in Operation Homecoming was greatly diminished when the actual transfer was made. The two aircraft from Nha Trang arrived in Saigon on 27 January 1973 to augment the 57th Medical Detachment's assets. Two ships were deployed to Can Tho to cover Military Region IV. On X-Day the entire unit was placed on 100% alert bringing to bear six ships with complete crews for the detachment's area of operations. The detachment remained in this overreaction posture until X+10 when reliable intelligence was received to indicate the POWs would be released in large groups at a centralized point. The aircraft and crews from Nha Trang returned to base on X+12. During this same period of 100% readiness posture, a requirement was placed on the detachment for another ship and crew to remain on a three-minute alert at the heliport for Vice President Agnew's visit to Saigon. This additional commitment required another crew to remain on the flight line twenty-four hours a day for the duration of the Vice President's stay. The special crew for Mr. Agnew remained on the flight line, not leaving even for meals for four days. With the additional information available on Operation Homecoming and the special standby completed the unit return to normal alert rotation, that being one ship in Can Tho and two ships on alert in Saigon.

When the first POW release was announced for 12 February 1973, the Detachment was briefed on its role. Since there was going to be a group released at a centralized point the headquarters element responsible for coordinating the operation decided only one Dustoff aircraft would be required. The remaining aircraft would be supplied by the 59th Corps Aviation Company. The detachment was also advised it would only be allowed a three-man crew, which was contrary to normal practices on any medical aircraft, but even over loud protests the three-man crew remained. The crew was chosen on 9 February 1973 and received extensive briefings from the operation commanders. At 0700 hours on 12 February 1973 the ship departed with the advance party for Loc Ninh for the release to take place. After many hours of delay and bickering the contingent returned to Tan Son Nhut Air Base with the returnees at approximately 2100 hours. The Dustoff ship transported one litter patient, Captain David Earle Baker, USAF, the only POW that required immediate medical attention. The next POW release was scheduled for 27 February 1973 but due to difficulties with the major parties the release was delayed until 4 February 1973. The second release took place completely from Hanoi. With this release the detachment's role in the POW releases was completed.

==== Withdrawal phase ====
Planning

When an agreement to end the hostilities in the Republic of Vietnam was imminent a roster of tentative X plus date DEROS was published by the Commanding Officer. The X plus DEROS roster was compiled with the coordination of each section leader to consider mission requirements anticipated and projected strength levels as directed by higher headquarters. Anticipated requirements indicated a fifty percent posture by X+30 would correlate with operational requirements. The drawdown to the fifty percent posture would be made gradually beginning on X+15. The first individuals to be released would be composed of hard DEROS personnel. After the first group the remaining personnel would be released in groups of five as their usefulness or requirement decreased. At X+30 the unit strength would be twenty-two personnel. These twenty-two remaining individuals would then be retained until X+45 to fulfill the mission requirements. At X+46 the personnel in the final group would begin to depart as the unit continued to inactivate. Key personnel, including the Commanding Officer, Operations Officer, Maintenance Officer and Property Book Officer would remain until approximately X+51 to complete the detachment's final closeout.

Actual events

A great influx of personnel and the majority of the redeploying/inactivating units closing ahead of schedule caused initial planning changes to be made shortly after X-day. The detachment was required to amend its personnel rotation schedule to begin on X+29 with the fifty percent posture being reached at X+34. One aviator departed on X+10 as his normal Date of Estimated Return from Overseas (DEROS). On X+30 the departure of U.S. Forces was suspended because of the delay in the release of American POWs. Once again, the detachment's release projections were revised and when the POW problem was resolved on X+35 the detachment's personnel status was reduced to fifty percent. The remaining twenty-two personnel were retained until X+45 as previously planned. As the 57th's mission terminated on X+45 the detachment released personnel in groups of four and five until by X+49 only four personnel remained to complete the final closeout. On X+51 the last four personnel reported to Camp Alpha for their return to the United States.

==== Roll-up phase ====
Planning

The turn-in and/or transfer of unit property was set forth in Operation Countdown (OPLAN 215). According to the guidance received much of the unit property was transferred to the ARVN or RVNAF prior to the peace treaty becoming a reality. The physical transfer of the property going to the Vietnamese Forces would not take place until the treaty became effective and at such a time when the requirement for the equipment by U.S. Forces was non-existent. All items not covered under Operation Countdown were to be turned into the keystone facility at Long Binh Post. The unit's aircraft physical transfer was under the direction of 1st Aviation Brigade G-4 section. The aircraft would be turned over to RVNAF with three being transferred by X+30. The remaining three ships would be physically transferred on or about X+45. All installation property had already been laterally transferred to the keystone processing activity prior to X-Day.

Actual events

As directed in Operation Thunderbolt the appropriate equipment was transferred to ARVN and RVNAF forces prior to X-Day and hand receipted back to the detachment until the requirement for them no longer existed. Following directives from the 1st Aviation Brigade G-4 the 57th's aircraft were held in the detachment until the RVNAF came to sign for them. Originally the direct support unit was going to act as a holding agent, but it was decided this would add unnecessary work and delay, thus the detachment dealt directly with 1st Aviation Brigade and the RVNAF for aircraft transfer. The first actual transfer of an aircraft was 16 February 1973 (X+19) when aircraft 69-15620 was transferred to the RVNAF. The problem in POW release caused a delay in the physical transfer of aircraft 68-15465 and 69–15223. The difficulties were resolved on X+34 and both of these aircraft were physically transferred on X+40. The remaining aircraft, 69–15278, 69–15296, and 69-15181 were held until X+45 to correlate with mission requirements. Three days were allowed for preparation and the remaining aircraft were turned in on X+49.

All weapons, ammunition, and signal grenades were turned in on 1 March 1973 (X+3l). The M-16 rifles were turned over to ARVN forces with the hand receipt. All other weapons to include pistols and grenade launchers were turned into keystone, while the ammunition was given to the Long Binh Depot. All station property was turned in as requirements permitted. The majority of the office equipment was turned into the keystone facility by X+30. With the first turn-in of the station property keystone revised the detachment's procedure. Instead of turning property in directly to keystone, who was acting as a holding agent, the detachment's property was hand receipted to all AFT; the receiving agency. The remaining station property was then physically transferred on X+46. All unit property was turned in by X+49 and the final audit was completed on X+50.

== Support to XVIII Airborne Corps ==
Congress established the Military Aid to Safety and Traffic (MAST) program with an effective date of 1 July 1974. This program was designed to allow Army air ambulance units to provide aeromedical evacuation support to civilian communities where they did not compete with an established civilian air ambulance service. The idea behind the program was that it would increase aviator and crew proficiency in Dustoff units while at the same time provide a much-needed service to local civilian communities. The 57th began MAST operations shortly after the program was established.

The mission of the 57th Medical Detachment (Helicopter Ambulance) at Fort Bragg was to:

1. Provide aeromedical evacuation of selected patients
1. Provide emergency movement of medical personnel and accompanying equipment and supplies to meet a critical requirement
2. Ensure uninterrupted delivery of blood, biologicals, and medical supplies when there was a critical requirement
3. Provide Military Assistance to Safety and Traffic (MAST) effective 1 July 1974

The above mission could be summed up as providing evacuation of patients at Fort Bragg, North Carolina to and from Womack Army Hospital and also to and from civilian hospitals within a 100-kilometer radius of Fort Bragg

The 57th Medical Detachment (Helicopter Ambulance) underwent significant changes to its MTOE due to the consolidated change to MTOE 08660HFC04 FC0176 with an effective date of 21 October 1975. The loss of one vehicle and trailer was felt to hamper the detachment's ability to accomplish a rapid and efficient air-loaded movement.

Of the total flight hours, 249.9 hours were performed for MAST missions in which 109 patients were evacuated.

On 12 October 1980, the 57th Medical Detachment completed its one-thousandth MAST mission.

On 12 April 1982 the 57th Medical Detachment was reorganized from an RA Team to an RG Team. The primary change in the reorganization was that its UH-1 Aircraft were replaced by UH-60 Blackhawks, with the first Blackhawk being received by the detachment on 15 June 1982. As it had been in the late 1950s, the 57th Medical Detachment was the first non-divisional medical evacuation unit to receive advanced aircraft—Eagle Dustoff of the 326th Medical Battalion having received the Army's first operational UH-60 Air ambulance on 15 January 1982.

On 12 February 1983, the 57th Medical Detachment was named runner-up in the U.S. Army Forces Command Commanding General's Award for maintenance excellence.

In June 1983, the detachment deployed to Egypt to participate in Exercise Bright Star.

On 27 February 1985, the 57th Medical Detachment was again named runner-up in the U.S. Army Forces Command Commanding General's award for Maintenance Excellence.

Between 1 July 1974 and 1 March 1985, the 57th Medical Detachment completed more than 1,500 MAST missions in support of civilian communities in Virginia and the Carolinas.

In January and October 1988, the 57th Medical Detachment provided aircraft and crews in support of Joint Task Force Bravo in Honduras.

On 23 December 1989, the 57th Medical Detachment deployed three aircrews to Panama in support of Operation JUST CAUSE. The crews deployed in support of the 214th Medical Detachment (Helicopter Ambulance), which was permanently stationed in Panama, and were integrated into that organization's operations. The detachment itself was not granted campaign participation credit for participation in Operation JUST CAUSE.

In February 1990, the 57th Medical Detachment supported the deployment of aircraft and crews to Honduras in support of Joint Task Force Bravo.

In August 1991, the 57th deployed to support Operation Green Stalk in Santa Fe, New Mexico. Operation Green Stalk was a counter-narcotics operation.

In June 1992 the detachment began receiving additional equipment from the 36th Medical Detachment at Fort Polk, Louisiana in preparation for the 57th's upcoming reorganization.

Two aircrews were deployed to Homestead Air Force Base, Florida in August 1992 as part of Hurricane Andrew relief efforts.

On 16 September 1992, the 57th Medical Detachment was reorganized and redesignated as the 57th Medical Company (Air Ambulance). Although the previous air ambulance companies, dating back to the 1st Air Ambulance Company (Provisional) in the Koran War, had been composed of 25 ships, the new design was of a 15-ship company, with three 3-ship Forward Support MEDEVAC Teams and a six-ship area support team. Each team had the necessary maintenance and refueling capability to operate separately from the company for periods of time, a capability lacking in both the 25-ship company and the 6-ship detachment. And, once again, the 57th led the way, being the first air ambulance company to reorganize under the new structure.

In January 1993, the detachment supported a deployment of aircraft and crews to Honduras in support of Joint Task Force Bravo.

The 57th Medical Company (Air Ambulance) began the 1998 with numerous external missions that required the company to provide additional MEDEVAC coverage to many geographically separated and remote areas. The unit accomplished this mission by providing two UH-60A helicopters to Fort Stewart, Georgia in support of 3rd Infantry Division, one aircraft in support of the 5th Ranger Training Battalion, Dahlonega, Georgia and the continuous 24-hour MEDEVAC mission at Fort Bragg, North Carolina. In addition, the unit maintained two UH-60As with aircrews in the Kingdom of Saudi Arabia providing support to the 4404th Air Wing (Provisional) at Prince Sultan Air Base (PSAB) as part of Operation Southern Watch.

In early January 1998, the unit was tasked to provide six aircraft and crews in support of Operation Purple Dragon, at Fort Bragg, North Carolina. The unit performed the mission flawlessly. The month of March found the company conducting a C-5 loadout with a Forward Support MEDEVAC Team and then further deploying to the field for a Company FTX. The loadout was conducted as part of the unit's effort to remain trained in strategic air deployment activities.

The company redeployed an FSMT (-) from Saudi Arabia in early July utilizing an Air Force C-17. The utilization of the C-17 was an opportunity for the unit to build load plans for the new aircraft. The aircrews had barely returned from the long 14-month deployment when the FORSCOM ARMS arrived at Fort Bragg. The 57th Medical Company (Air Ambulance) received 2 of 3 FORSCOM Commander's coins given for outstanding performance. The unit received several commendable ratings and regained respect among the aviation units on Simmons Army Airfield.

On 6 August 1998, the company conducted a change of command ceremony in which MAJ Harold Abner relinquished command to MAJ Scott Putzier. The unit immediately moved into the planning stages for its first External Evaluation (EXEVAL) in over 5 years. The unit conducted an EXEVAL train-up FTX in AUG as part of its support to the 82d Airborne Division, Division Support Command (DISCOM) Operation Provider Strike Exercise. During the operations the company supported on one level or another all three Forward Support Battalions and the Main Support Battalion. In September the unit conducted a defensive live fire on OP-9, a successful live fire concentrating on a perimeter defense. Also in September the unit conducted a C-5 static load at Pope Air Force Base. On 19 October, the order was issued, and the company began to prepare for its mission. The EXEVAL included a C-5 loadout as part of the scenario prior to the conduct of the EXEVAL. The EXEVAL, from 19 to 23 October, provided an excellent opportunity for the new commander to determine the company's weak areas and develop a training plan for the next year. The unit performed well in most areas and was granted credit for the EXEVAL by the 55th Medical Group Commander.

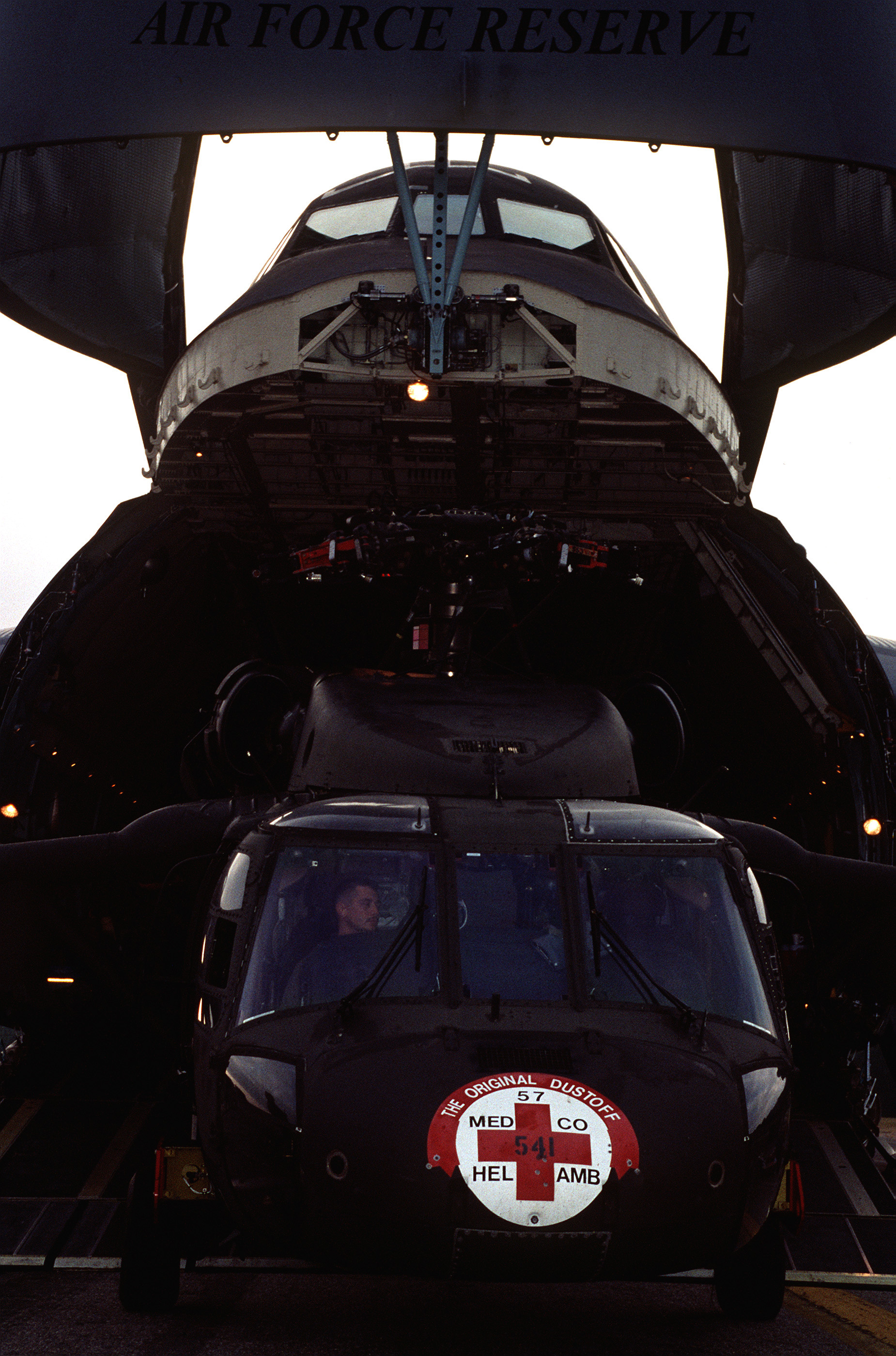
The 57th Medical Company conducts a static load of a UH-60 air ambulance aboard a C-5 Galaxy, here in 1994, at Pope Air Force Base

In November 1998, the 498th Medical Company (Air Ambulance), a sister company at Fort Benning, Georgia, deployed to provide humanitarian relief to several countries in Central America. The 57th Medical Company (Air Ambulance) was tasked to provide support to 5th Ranger Training Battalion-Dahlonga, GA, 6th Ranger Training Battalion-Eglin Air Force Base, FL, 3rd Infantry Division (M) at Fort Stewart, GA in addition to the 24 hour MEDEVAC support to XVIII Airborne Corps and Fort Bragg. Added to the unit's tremendous workload in November was C,FSMT's deployment to JRTC in support of 3rd Brigade, 82nd Airborne Division and the unit's Initial Command Inspection for the new commander.

The 57th Medical Company (Air Ambulance) began 1999 with numerous external missions requiring the unit to provide aeromedical support to Fort Bragg, Fort Stewart, and the Ranger Training Battalions located at Dahlonega Georgia and Eglin Air Force Base Florida.

The 57th Medical Company supported both Ranger Training Battalions for the first two months of the year while the 498th Medical Company (Air Ambulance) recovered its personnel and equipment from their South America deployment.

On 18 May 1999 the 57th Medical Company conducted Deck Landing Qualifications (DLQs) with the USNS Comfort off the North Carolina Coast, qualifying five aircrews, receiving tours of the ship, and providing the USNS Comfort's deck crew and fire fighters emergency engine shutdown and crews extraction training. This was the first time in over two years the unit had conducted DLQs on the USNS Comfort.

August and September 1999 proved to be very busy deploying the FSMT (-) to Kuwait, fielding the ASIP Radio systems, and supporting an 82d Airborne Division Joint Readiness Training Center rotation. The unit provided EFMB Evaluation and testing support to the 44th Medical Brigade EFMB in September running the Litter Obstacle Course and providing the aircraft and evaluators to the Evacuation Lane. The EFMB Testing cycle was disrupted by Hurricane Floyd, which caused the evacuation of the unit's aircraft at Fort Bragg and Fort Stewart.

Hurricane relief efforts in 1999 involved the entire company as the unit flew 58 hours utilizing all available aircrews to include those Battalion staff members on flight status. During the weeklong relief operation, the company provided continuous aircraft support to the disaster/flood area in support of Federal Emergency Management Agency operations which resulted in over 80 patients/individuals rescued or moved shelters.

Within days of the hurricane relief operations ending, the unit again sent an FSMT in support of the 82d Airborne Division to the Joint Readiness Training Center that consumed most of the month of October.

== Operation Urgent Fury ==
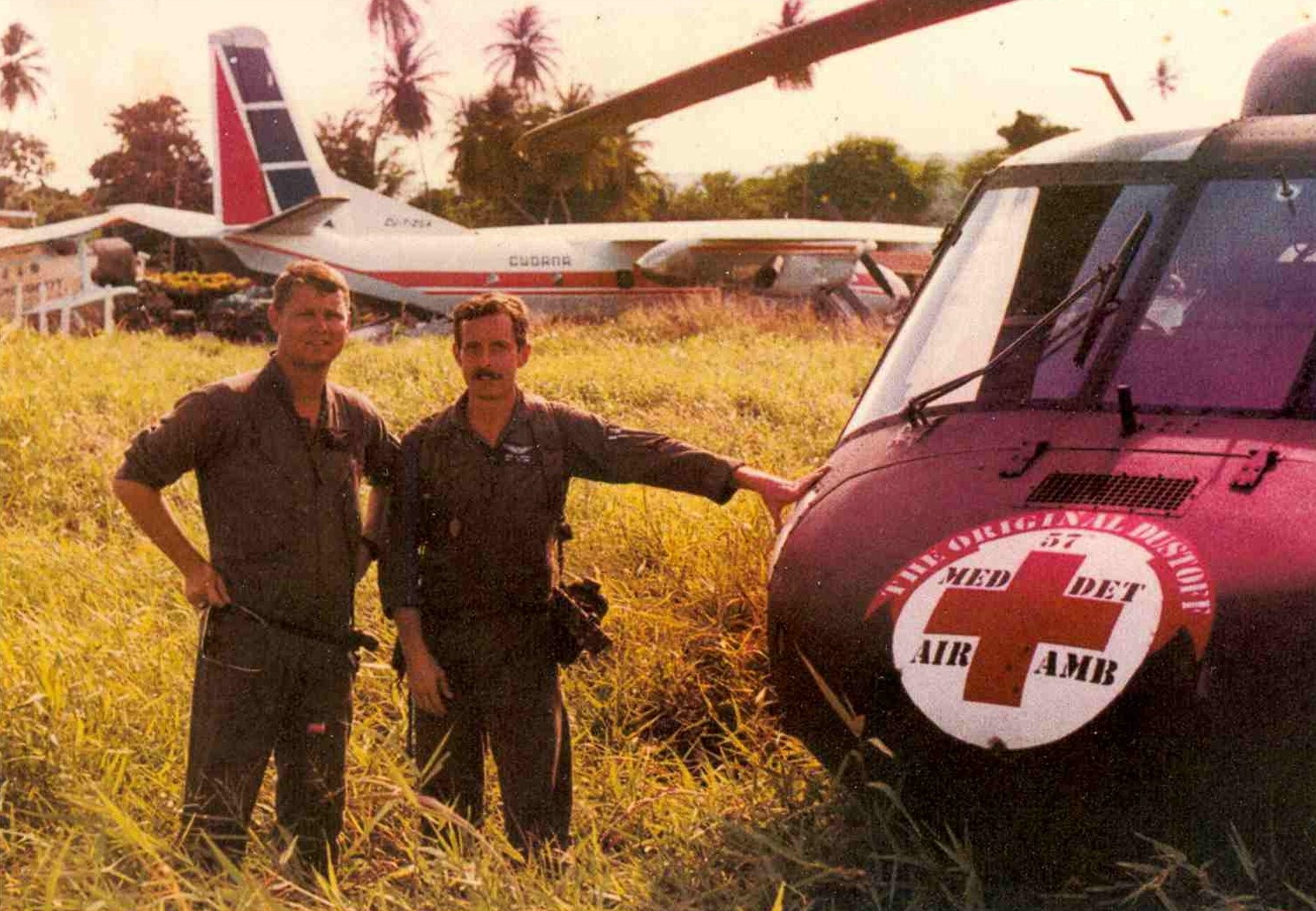
Major Art Hapner (left) and Captain Kevin Swenie of the 57th Medical Detachment in Grenada

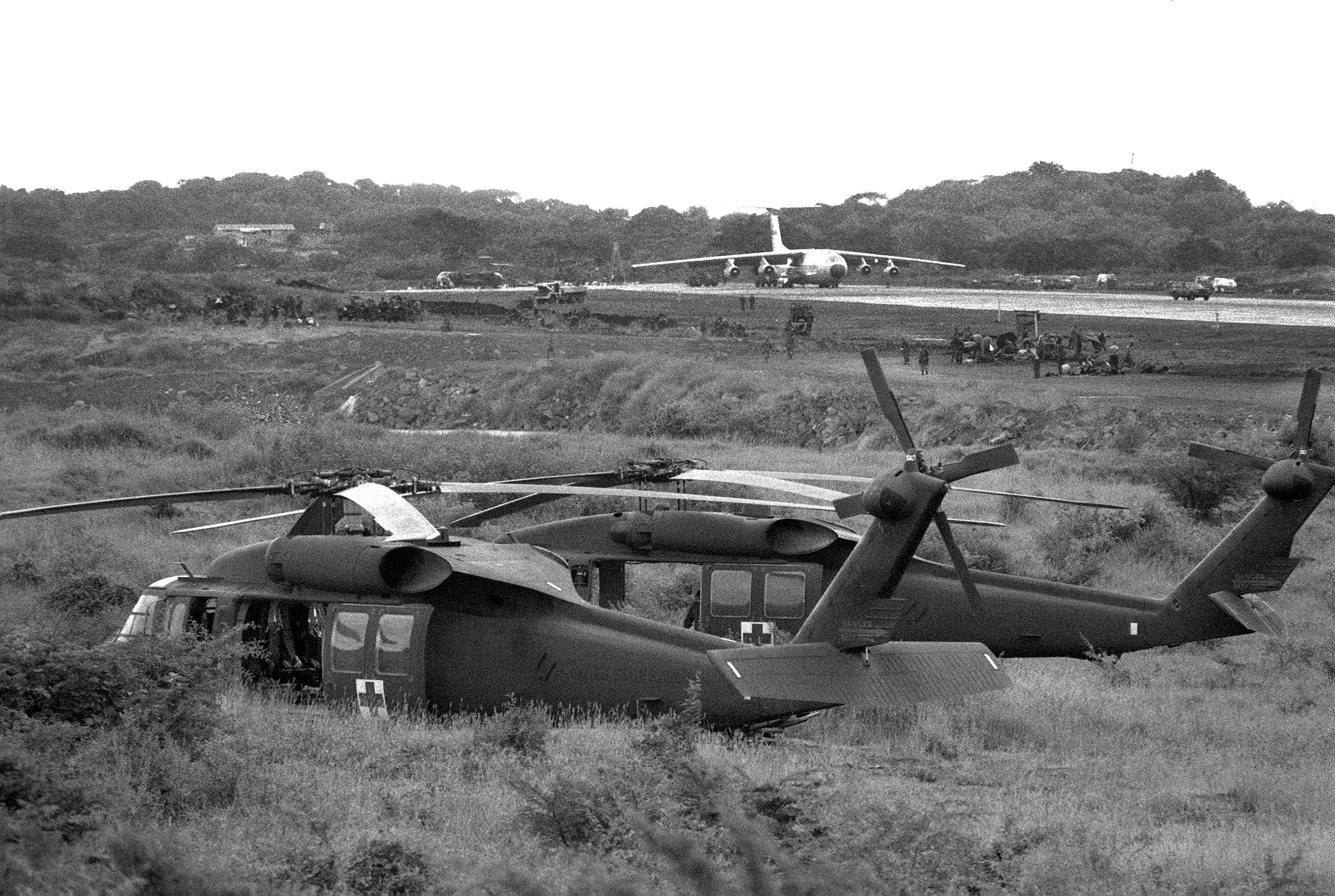
Two UH-60 Black Hawk MEDEVAC helicopters parked in a field near Point Salines Airfield during the multiservice, multinational Operation URGENT FURY. A C-141B Starlifter aircraft is parked on the runway in the background

The 57th Medical Detachment deployed to the Island of Grenada to participate in Operation URGENT FURY on 29 October 1983. The detachment would remain engaged in operations in Grenada in support of the Caribbean Peacekeeping Force until 30 October 1984.

== Operations Desert Shield/Storm ==
On 9 September 1990, the 57th Medical Detachment deployed to Saudi Arabia in support of Operations DESERT SHIELD and DESERT STORM.

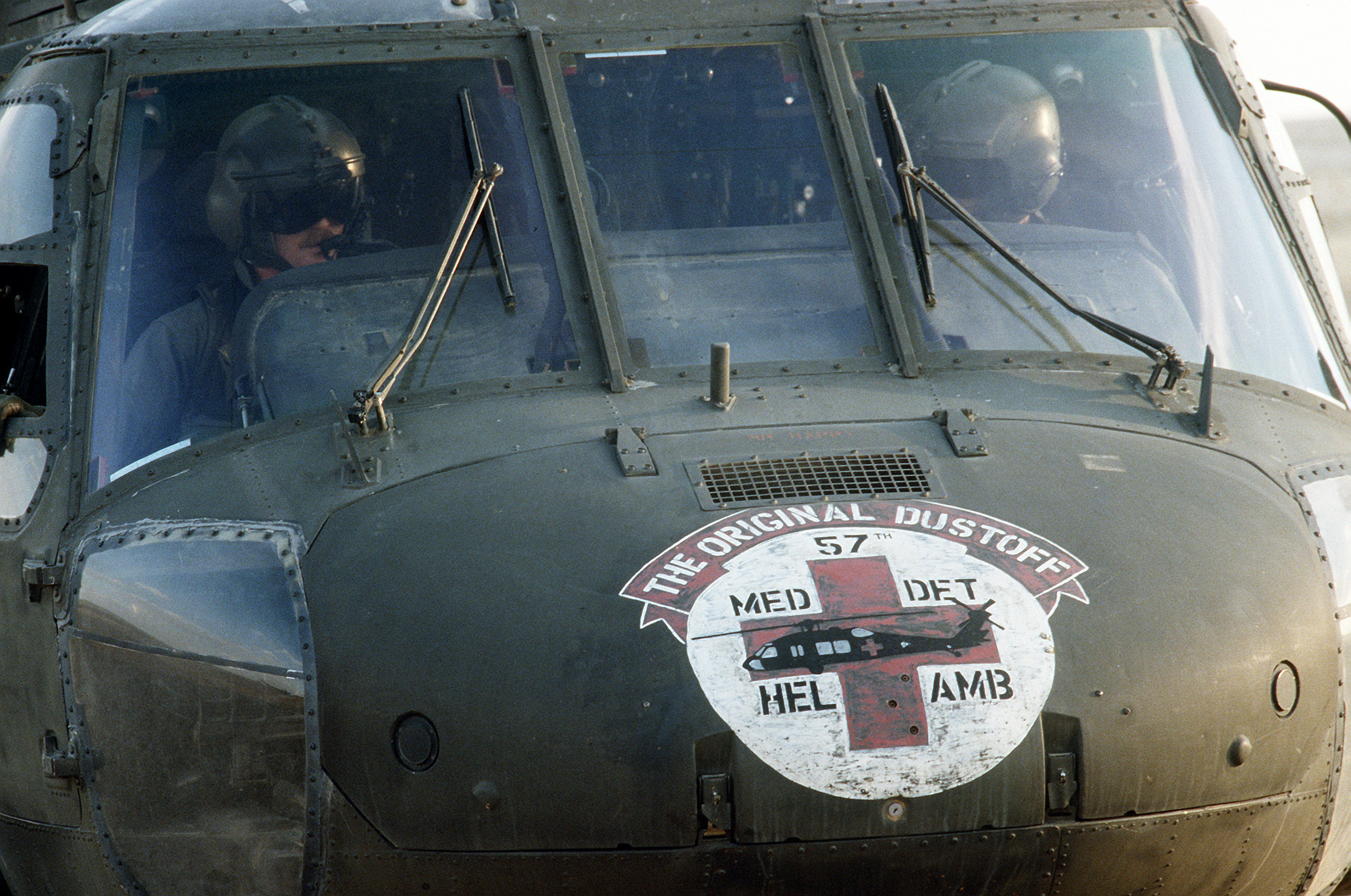
A UH-60 Black Hawk (Blackhawk) ambulance helicopter from the 57th Medical Detachment, Fort Bragg, N.C., prepares to takeoff during Operation Desert Shield

== Operation Uphold Democracy ==
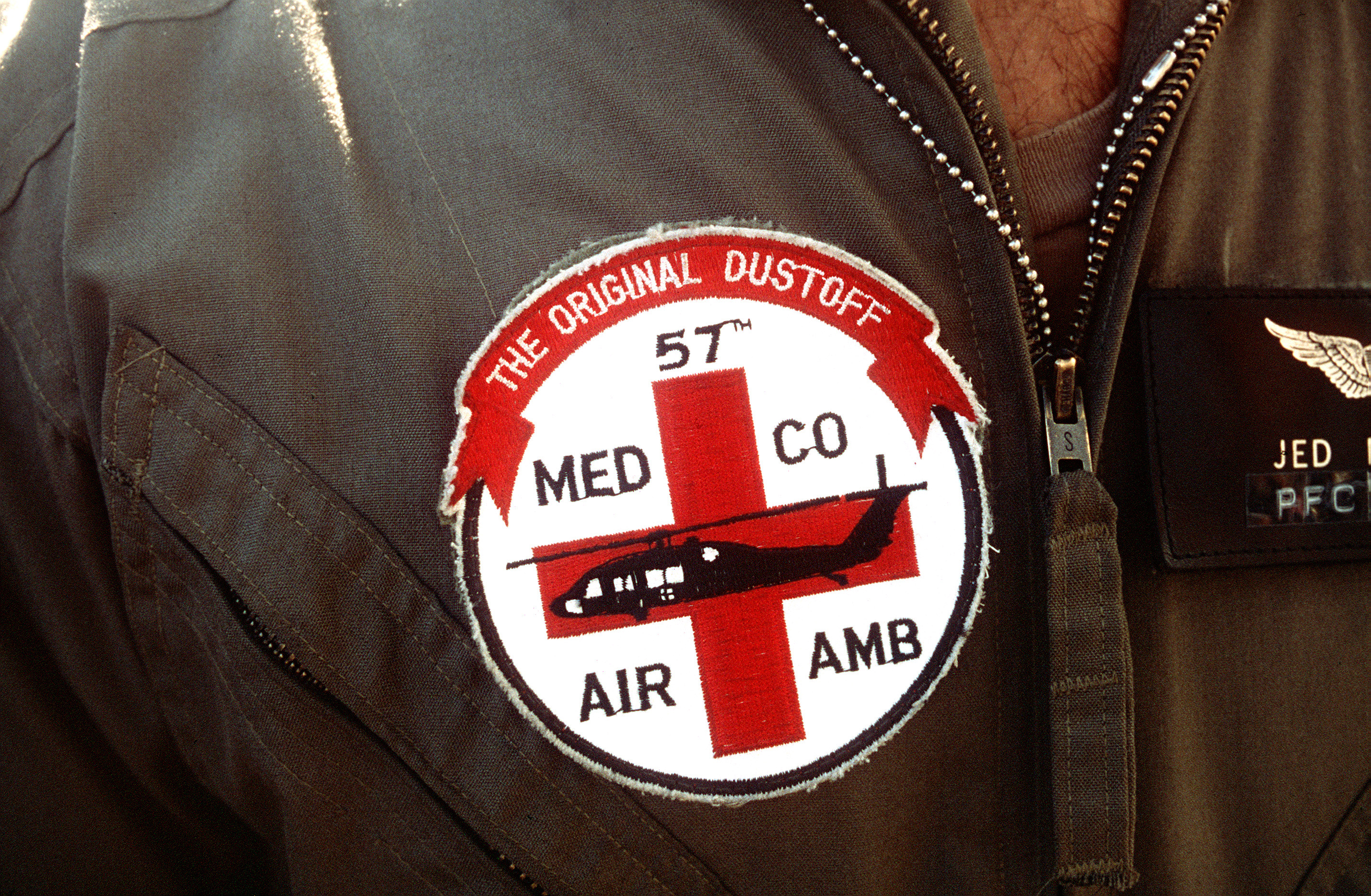
A close-up of 57th Medical Company Air Ambulance Patch. The unit, from Fort Bragg, NC, was deployed with the USS Dwight D. Eisenhower (CVN-69) in support of Operation Uphold Democracy

== Casing the Guidon ==
On 26 January 2007, as part of a reengineering of Army aviation, the 57th Medical Detachment conducted an inactivation ceremony at its hangar at Fort Bragg, North Carolina, named for Major Charles L. Kelly. The keynote speaker was Kelly's son, Charles L. Kelly Jr. Although the unit would not be formally inactivated until 15 June 2007, this marked its end, as personnel and equipment were transferred after that, primarily to form Company C, 3d Battalion, 82d Aviation Regiment, 82d Airborne Division Fort Bragg North Carolina. Although most of the equipment and personnel transferred (as part of the conversion, the divisional MEDEVAC companies were organized as 12 ship companies instead of 15 ship companies), the lineage and honors of the 57th did not transfer to the new unit. The 57th Medical Detachment remains on the inactive rolls of the Army.

== Commanders ==
Rank	Name	Begin date	End date	Notes
Captain	John W. Hammett	27 October 1953		Hammett was the first commander of the 57th Medical Detachment (Helicopter Ambulance). Hammett would later serve as the first S-3 of the 44th Medical Brigade upon its deployment to Vietnam in 1966
				Gap in Data
Captain	Albert G. Benson		October 1957	Reassigned to the 82d Medical Detachment (Helicopter Ambulance) when the 57th moved to Fort Meade, Maryland
1st Lieutenant	Lawrence L. Rusiewicz	October 1957	29 November 1957	
1st Lieutenant	Grady Perry	29 November 1957	28 December 1957	
1st Lieutenant	Joseph I. Martin Jr.	28 December 1957	January 1959	Martin's father, Major General Joseph I. Martin Sr., Medical Corps, U.S. Army, was the namesake of Martin Army Community Hospital, Fort Benning, Georgia.
1st Lieutenant	Lawrence L. Rusiewicz	January 1959	March 1959	
1st Lieutenant	Joseph I. Martin Jr.	March 1959	14 April 1960	
1st Lieutenant	Paul A. Bloomquist	14 April 1960	26 September 1960	As a Lieutenant Colonel, was killed in a terrorist bombing attack at the I.G. Farben Building on 11 May 1972. Inducted into the Dustoff Hall of Fame 22 February 2003.
Captain	John P. Temperilli Jr.	26 September 1960	26 February 1963	Deployed the detachment to Vietnam Inducted into the Dustoff Hall of Fame 24 February 2002
Major	Lloyd E. Spencer	26 February 1963	11 January 1964	Selected the unit callsign "Dustoff"
Major	Charles L. Kelly	12 January 1964	1 July 1964	Killed in Action 1 July 1964 Inducted into the Dustoff Hall of Fame on 17 February 2001
Captain	Paul A. Bloomquist	1 July 1964	9 August 1964	
Major	Howard A. Huntsman Jr.	10 August 1964	1 July 1965	
Major	Thomas C. Christie	1 July 1965	18 July 1965	
Major	Paul A. Bloomquist	18 July 1965	16 August 1965	
Major	William A. Campbell	16 August 1965	15 June 1966	
Major	Charles A. Mateer	15 June 1966	31 December 1966	
Major	Warren K. Hoen	1 January 1967	15 August 1967	
Captain	Frederick M. Harker	15 August 1967	2 September 1967	
Captain	Thomas W. Hill	2 September 1967	30 October 1967	
Lieutenant Colonel	Richard W. Healey	30 October 1967	1 September 1967	
Major	Thomas W. Hill	2 September 1967	5 July 1968	
Captain	John M. Kamenar	6 July 1968	31 July 1968	
Major	Freddie J. Mills	1 August 1968	5 November 1968	
Major	Lillard F. Belcher	6 November 1968	3 July 1969	
Captain	Pierre Allemond	4 July 1969	17 August 1969	
Major	Edward J. Preston	18 August 1969	15 February 1970	
Captain	Thomas C. Jacoby	15 February 1970	10 September 1970	
Captain	Ronny E. Porta	10 September 1970	23 August 1971	
Captain	Aubrey K. Lange	23 August 1971	5 August 1972	
Captain	Harvey H. Hueter	5 August 1972	9 March 1973	Redeployed the detachment
				Gap in Data
Major	Robert D. Rose	9 September 1974		
Captain	Albert Hoffman			in command in April 1975
				Gap in Data
Major	Robert Kornegay		13 July 1982	
Major	Arthur W. Hapner	14 July 1982	5 January 1984	Commanded detachment during Operation Urgent Fury
Major	Kevin Swenie	6 January 1984	July 1985	
Major	Stephen M. Bailey	July 1985	1987	
Major	Leonard Sly	1987	1989	
Major	Butch Wardlaw	1989	1991	Commanded the detachment during Operations Desert Shield and Desert Storm
Major	Robert Hardin	1991	1993	
Major	Wayne Clark	1993	1995	
Major	David MacDonald	1995	1997	Inducted into the Dustoff Hall of Fame 21 May 2022.
Major	Harold Abner	1997	6 August 1998	
Major	Scott Putzier	6 August 1998	2000	
Major	Neal David	2000	2002	
Major	Bradley Pecor	2002	2004	
Major	Brady Rose	2004	January 2007	Cased the guidon and inactivated the company

== Annual evacuation recapitulations ==
=== 1958 recapitulation ===
Evacuation Summary

Month	Patients
January	5
February	8
March	0
April	0
May	0
June	0
July	0
August	0
September	0
October	0
November	0
December	0
Total	13

=== 1959 Recapitulation ===
25 Patients

=== 1960 Recapitulation ===
Evacuation summary

Month	Patients
January	3
February	10
March	5
April	8
May	N/A
June	14
July	2
August	5
September	2
October	1
November	6
December	1
Total	57+

=== Medical evacuations in the Republic of Vietnam ===
==== 1962 Recapitulation ====
As of 30 June 1962, the detachment had carried twelve U.S. patients, fourteen ARVN personnel and transported fifteen doctors and 1,000 pounds of medical supplies.

For the quarter ending 30 September 1962, the detachment had flown 239 hours and evacuated 141 patients.

In the quarter ending 31 December 1962, the detachment flew 216 hours and evacuated 66 patients.

A recapitulation for 1962 reflected a total of 890 hours flown and 235 evacuations.

==== 1963 Recapitulation ====
Statistics for 1963 showed that the 57th Medical Detachment evacuated a total of 1,972 patients. A monthly high was reached in September with 387 patients and a daily high on 10 September with 197 patients evacuated. These figures reflect an 893% increase over the 1962 figure of 235 patients evacuated.

==== 1964 Recapitulation ====
Evacuation Summary

Month	Vietnamese	U.S. and Third Country	Total
January	167	11	178
February	193	19	212
March	416	32	448
April	470	37	507
May	320	34	354
June	557	33	590
July	711	57	768
August	308	38	346
September	377	31	408
October	193	31	224
November	169	28	197
December	193	24	217

Aircraft utilization

Total Hours flown	4029.8
Day hours flown	3223.2
Night hours flown	806.6
Average hours per month	335.8
Total Patient evacuations	4442
Average per month	370
Total Missions flown	3670
Total night missions flown	575
Total assaults covered	788
Total passengers carried	957

==== 1965 Recapitulation ====
Evacuation Summary

Month	Patients Flown
January	236
February	139
March	261
April	260
May	312
June	372
July	336
August	237
September	361
October	636
November	437
December	385
Total	3572

==== 1966 Recapitulation ====
Evacuation Summary

Month	Patients Flown
January	531
February	370
March	468
April	625
May	642
June	825
July	880
August	671
September	638
October	921
November	1001
December	832
Total	8384

==== 1967 Recapitulation ====
Evacuation Summary

Month	Patients Flown	Missions
January	959	492
February	1,148	552
March	623	246
April	913	382
May	768	401
June	1,356	383
July	568	244
August	774	236
September	742	243
October	919	454
November	691	390
December	846	539
Total	10,307	5,562

==== 1968 Recapitulation ====
The total patient evacuations, number of missions, and aircraft hours flown for the year 1968 are broken down as follows:

Month	Patients Flown	Missions	Hours
January	812	427	391
February	1,116	455	345
March	725	372	314
April	820	380	307
May	1,259	508	415
June	873	385	355
July	549	350	281
August	1,003	453	533
September	847	363	309
October	794	532	333
November	467	336	388
December	720	416	414
Total	9,985		

==== 1969 Recapitulation ====
Evacuation statistics compiled by the detachment for 1969 are as follows:

Month	Patients Flown	U.S.	ARVN	Other	Total Hours	AVG AVN Time
January	831	463	231	137	370	51
February	738	461	160	117	351	59
March	883	730	50	103	450	75
April	1,033	671	121	241	314	65
May	784	570	100	94	316	59
June	982	650	150	182	386	62
July	1,329	978	157	194	397	65
August	1,408	1,042	268	98	432	69
September	1,555	955	400	200	367	53
October	1,896	1,090	525	281	438	77
November	1,899	1,214	380	305	450	57
December	2,782	1,515	614	653	504	91
Total	16,120	10,339	3,156	2,605	4,775	65.3

==== 1970 Recapitulation ====
Evacuation statistics compiled by the detachment for 1970 are as follows:

Month	Patients Flown	U.S.	ARVN	Civilian	Total Hours
January	1,097	42	758	297	453
February	1,831	51	1,041	739	686
March	1,298	53	832	413	580
April	1,300	68	835	397	561
May	1,697	125	1,170	402	649
June	1,380	66	970	344	530
July	1,387	106	898	383	712
August	1,175	60	767	348	508
September	1,392	75	996	321	609
October	1,307	103	1,016	188	534
November	994	70	719	205	478
December	392	43	659	690	571
Total	15,897	862	10,661	4,727	6,871

==== 1971 Recapitulation ====
Evacuation statistics compiled by the detachment for 1971 are as follows:

Month	Patients Flown	U.S.	ARVN	Other	Missions	Total Hours
January	544	38	397	100	309	253
February	880	42	748	90	497	441
March	871	55	730	86	481	437
April	426	17	372	37	307	333
May	448	21	380	47	292	329
June	432	34	359	39	256	243
July	257	12	227	18	215	220
August	257	14	218	25	238	246
September	243	23	191	29	192	244
October	224	27	177	20	147	233
November	226	37	170	19	193	243
December	212	36	167	9	154	296
Total	5,020	356	4,136	519	3,281	3,518

==== 1972 Recapitulation ====
Evacuation statistics compiled by the detachment for 1972 are as follows:

Month	Flight Hours Day	Flight Hours Night	U.S. Patients	FWMAF Patients	ARVN Patients	POW Patients	Vietnamese Civilian Patients	Other Patients	Aircraft Availability	Day Patients	Night Patients
January	340	102	110	75	212	0	10	3	90%	330	80
February	302	78	98	53	150	0	10	0	100%	261	50
March	275	83	84	62	173	0	10	0	85%	269	60
April	148	60	54	9	80	0	0	0	74%	120	23
May	102	28	21	2	16	0	0	0	73%	25	14
June	148	78	70	9	17	0	0	0	92%	76	20
July	113	62	109	9	11	0	0	0	75.7%	105	24
August	142	73	71	14	16	0	3	0	82%	82	20
September	140	55	69	5	14	0	0	0	80%	70	18
October	165	80	71	37	31	0	3	0	78%	101	41
November	104	60	58	5	9	0	0	0	84%	60	12
December	141	63	63	33	11	0	0	0	82%	97	29
Total	2120	830	878	313	740	0	36	3	83%	1,596	391

=== Total evacuations in the Republic of Vietnam ===
Total patients evacuated in the Republic of Vietnam between 5 May 1962 and 31 December 1972 totaled 77,940

Year	Patients Evacuated
1962	235
1963	1,972
1964	4,442
1965	3,572
1966	8,384
1967	10,307
1968	9,985
1969	16,120
1970	15,897
1971	5,020
1972	1,970
Total	77,940

=== 1975 Recapitulation ===
During 1975 the 57th Medical Detachment (Helicopter Ambulance) flew 839.2 flight hours and evacuated a total of 669 patients.
