= Valley Forge General Hospital =

U.S. Army hospital, 1942-1974

Coordinates: 40.1186°N 75.5484°W

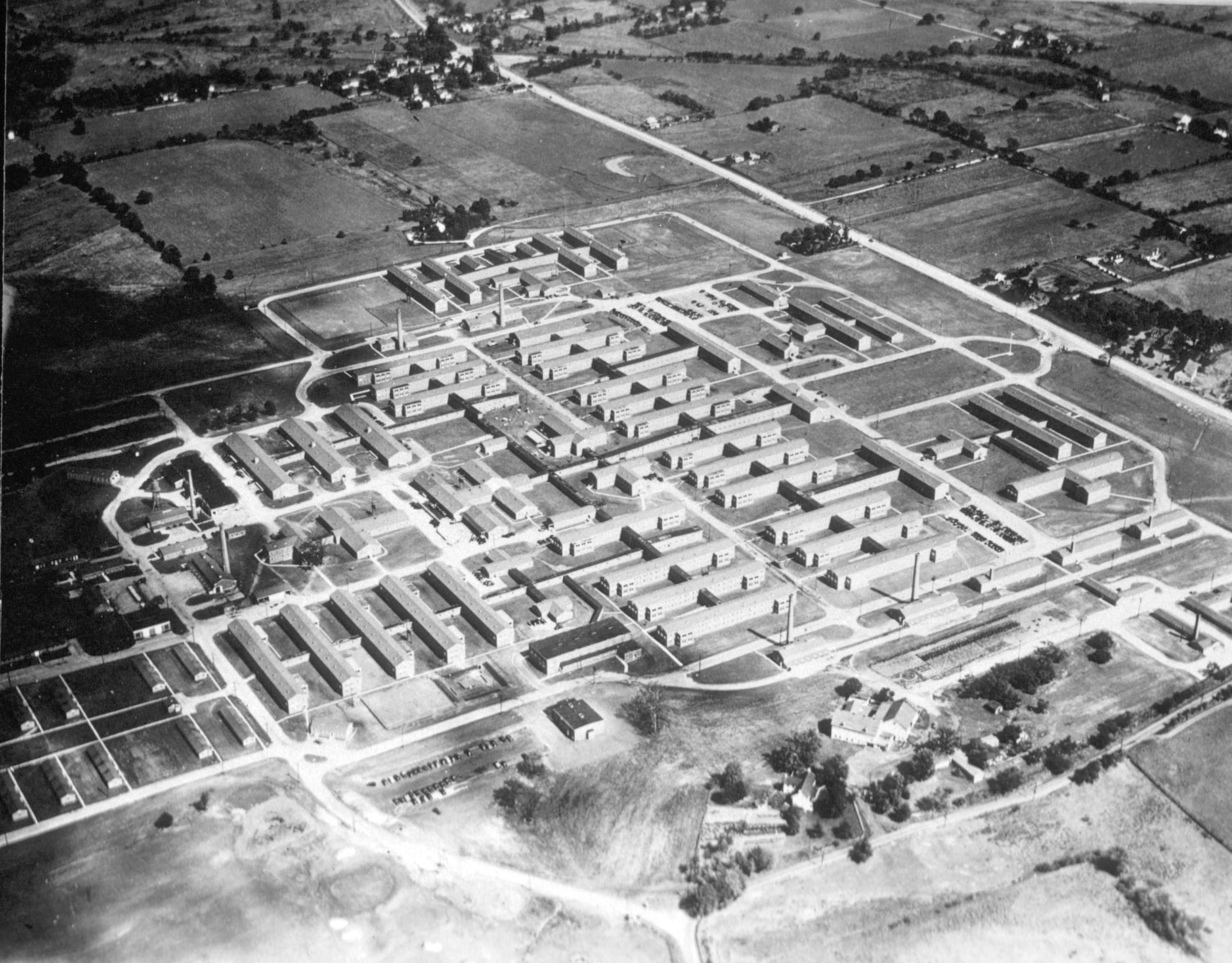
An aerial photo of the Valley Forge General Hospital, a United States Army hospital that operated from 1943 to 1974 in Phoenixville, Pennsylvania

Valley Forge General Hospital is a former military hospital in Phoenixville, Pennsylvania. The hospital was near both Philadelphia, Pennsylvania and Valley Forge. It was the only United States Army General Hospital named for a place.

== History ==
=== World War II ===
The hospital was built in 1942, and opened on Washington's Birthday in 1943 to care for the wounded of World War II. It became the largest military hospital in the United States. Eventually, the hospital had well over 3,000 patients and over 100 separate buildings. One feature of the hospital was its design of primarily two story buildings, interconnected by corridors. There were very long ramps leading from one floor to the other, to facilitate movement of wheelchairs and gurneys.

By early 1944, Valley Forge General Hospital had been identified as one of two general hospitals, the other being Letterman General Hospital at the Presidio of San Francisco—which specialized in the treatment of patients who had suffered blinding eye injuries. The Army's goal was to get newly identified cases of blindness to one of those hospitals as soon as possible, and if the patient could not be moved, to send a representative from the hospital to the patient's location to begin coordinating care as soon as possible. In addition to physical treatment, the centers also focused on "social rehabilitation," helping the patients to adjust to their new condition before handing them over to the Veterans' Administration for further care—holding them past the point of "maximum medical benefit," in other words, in order to complete their social training.

By 1945, three dentists were assigned to Valley Forge after the Surgeon General discovered that their independent work had developed a new type of artificial eye which was described as "superior in every way to the current glass eyes." After perfecting their production techniques and teaching the staff at Valley Forge how to fabricate the eyes, the three dentists, Captain Stanley F. Erpf, Major Milton S. Wirtz, and Major Victor H. Dietz, were all transferred to other hospitals where they could further expand the number of people using their new techniques. They were also each awarded the Legion of Merit for their work, and published their procedure in the Bulletin of the U.S. Army Medical Department, further spreading knowledge of the procedure.

In January 1962, Valley Forge General Hospital was one of four Army general hospitals chosen to offer a six-month supervised clinical training program in psychiatric nursing for Army Nurse Corps officers, qualifying them for award of the psychiatric nurse military occupational specialty upon completion of the course.

In January 1967 the U.S. Army Medical Materiel Agency, which was a tenant of the hospital, began teaching the Medical Depot Inventory Management Course. The course, along with the Medical Materiel Agency, moved to Fort Detrick, Maryland in 1974 in preparation for the hospital's closing.

In the late 1960s, Valley Forge General Hospital, along with seven other major Army hospitals, became the home of a "Clinical Specialist" training program (military MOS 91C). At that time, a person had to have been a medic for at least two years, and have a minimum of two years remaining on their enlistment after completing the school, in order to be accepted. This was advanced training for ten months, on top of all previous training and experience. This program was considered equivalent to a civilian LPN or LVN course but also included many military medicine oriented training objectives.

=== Vietnam War ===
Patient flow during the Vietnam War had patients flying into McGuire Air Force Base, New Jersey. Army patients would then be moved by Air Force ambulance bus to Walson Army Hospital at the adjacent Fort Dix, where they would be further prepared for movement, typically by Army ambulance buses if they were moving to Valley Forge. In 1969, the 212th Medical Detachment (Helicopter Ambulance) was activated at Fort Meade, Maryland. One of its primary missions was to transport patients from Fort Dix, New Jersey to Valley Forge. The need was clearly there; between January 1, 1968 and September 30, 1970, 7,033 patients were moved from Dix to the Valley Forge General Hospital. The 22nd Ambulance Train was activated at Fort Dix on January 22, 1969, for the purpose of moving patients from Dix to Valley Forge, but the Penn Central Railroad informed the Army that due to the deteriorated condition of the tracks between Dix and Valley Forge, the rail line could not be used for passenger service, and the 22nd Ambulance Train never moved a single patient from the time their newly renovated train arrived on July 17, 1969, and the unit was inactivated on 20 December 1969. The 212th Medical Detachment was inactivated at Fort Meade on March 29, 1973.

As part of a general reorganization of the Army Medical Department, the United States Army Health Services Command was activated at Fort Sam Houston under the command of Major General Spurgeon Neel. As part of that reorganization plan, all Class II Medical Department Activities and installations were transferred from the direct control of the Office of the Surgeon General to the new command. Among the units transferred was the Valley Forge General Hospital, as well as its security force, the 250th Military Police Detachment, effective on April 1, 1973. The Medical Equipment Test and Evaluation Activity, which had been part of the United States Army Academy of Health Sciences at Fort Sam Houston, Texas, had already been transferred to the United States Army Medical Materiel Agency, a tenant activity on the Valley Forge General Hospital Installation, on February 1, 1973.

In 1972, the Valley Forge General Hospital became host to a program for training Occupational Therapy Specialist (MOS 91L). The course was 21 weeks long, and converted what had been an on-the-job training program into a formal course of instruction, providing classroom training coupled with clinical experience with Valley Forge's patients. The course was fully accredited by a civilian certification agency, the Association of Occupational Therapy Assistants. Seventeen students graduated from the first class and became Certified Occupational Therapy Assistants.

In early 1973, as part of Operation Homecoming, Valley Forge General Hospital received 16 former Army Prisoners of War who had been released by the Vietnamese—the most received by any of the eight Army hospitals which received POWs. These 16 men, including the only Army Medical Department officer (who was also the only military physician) to be captured, were sent to Valley Forge for comprehensive medical examinations before being released to reunite with their families. This was part of a program to send the former POWs to the medical treatment facility closest to their homes.

=== Closure ===
On April 17, 1973, Col Phillip Deffer, the hospital commander, announced that the hospital would be closing, stating that:

Valley Forge General Hospital, over the past 31 years, has faced many challenges of great complexity, and it has met each head on, has succeeded and has walked away proud that it accomplished such a mission. It's now my duty to officially inform you of the next challenge facing us. "At this hour in Washington, the Secretary of Defense is having a public news conference, at which he is announcing the entire base realignment package ... Valley Forge will be closed.

The Valley Forge General Hospital was placed in an inactive status effective March 31, 1974, by Department of the Army General Order number 4, dated February 11, 1974 and it became a sub-installation of Fort Detrick, Maryland effective July 1, 1974, by Department of the Army General Order number 18, dated June 10, 1974.

The site of the Valley Forge General Hospital was occupied in 1976 by the Valley Forge Christian College, now the University of Valley Forge.

== Popular culture ==
The hospital is the setting for the 1951 film Bright Victory. After the film Bright Victory was released, all personnel assigned to the hospital were required to view the film.

Actor Gene Wilder was a neuropsychiatric technician at Valley Forge General Hospital in the late 1950s.

== Commanders ==
Image	Rank	Name	Start date	End date
Henry Beeuwkes	Colonel	Henry Beeuwkes	February 1942	March 1945
William W. Vaughan	Brigadier General	William W. Vaughan	March 1945	May 1946
Cleon J. Gentzkow	Colonel	Cleon J. Gentzkow	May 1946	August 1948
Kenneth A. Brewer	Colonel	Kenneth A Brewer	August 1948	June 1950
George R. Carpenter	Colonel	George R. Carpenter	June 1950	September 1950
John M. Welch	Colonel	John M. Welch	September 1950	August 1952
Kenneth A. Brewer	Colonel	Kenneth A Brewer	September 1952	June 1955
Mack M. Green	Brigadier General	Mack M. Green	July 1955	July 1956
Sam F. Seeley	Brigadier General	Sam F. Seeley	July 1956	March 1957
Carl W. Tempel	Brigadier General	Carl W. Tempel	May 1957	August 1958
	Colonel	Carl D. MacMillan	August 1958	April 1959
	Brigadier General	James L. Snyder	April 1959	July 1959
Alvin L. Gorby	Major General	Alvin L. Gorby	August 1959	January 1961
	Brigadier General	Henry S. Murphey	February 1961	May 1962
	Colonel	Kenneth Drew Orr	June 1962	May 1966
	Colonel	Alton B. Peyton	May 1966	August 1966
John Boyd Coates Jr.	Brigadier General	John Boyd Coates Jr.	September 1, 1966	June 1, 1969
	Colonel	Thomas L. Robbins	June 1969	July 1969
	Colonel	Kryder E. Van Buskirk	July 1969	August 1971
Philip A. Deffer	Colonel	Phillip A. Deffer	August 1971	August 1973
	Colonel	Ekrem S. Turan	August 1973	closure
