= 15th Medical Battalion =

15th Medical Battalion may refer to

- 15th Medical Battalion (United States Army), now the 15th Brigade Support Battalion (United States)
- 15th Medical Battalion (German Army)
