= United States Army Medical Command, Europe =

Former medical command of the U.S. Army Europe (1968-1978)

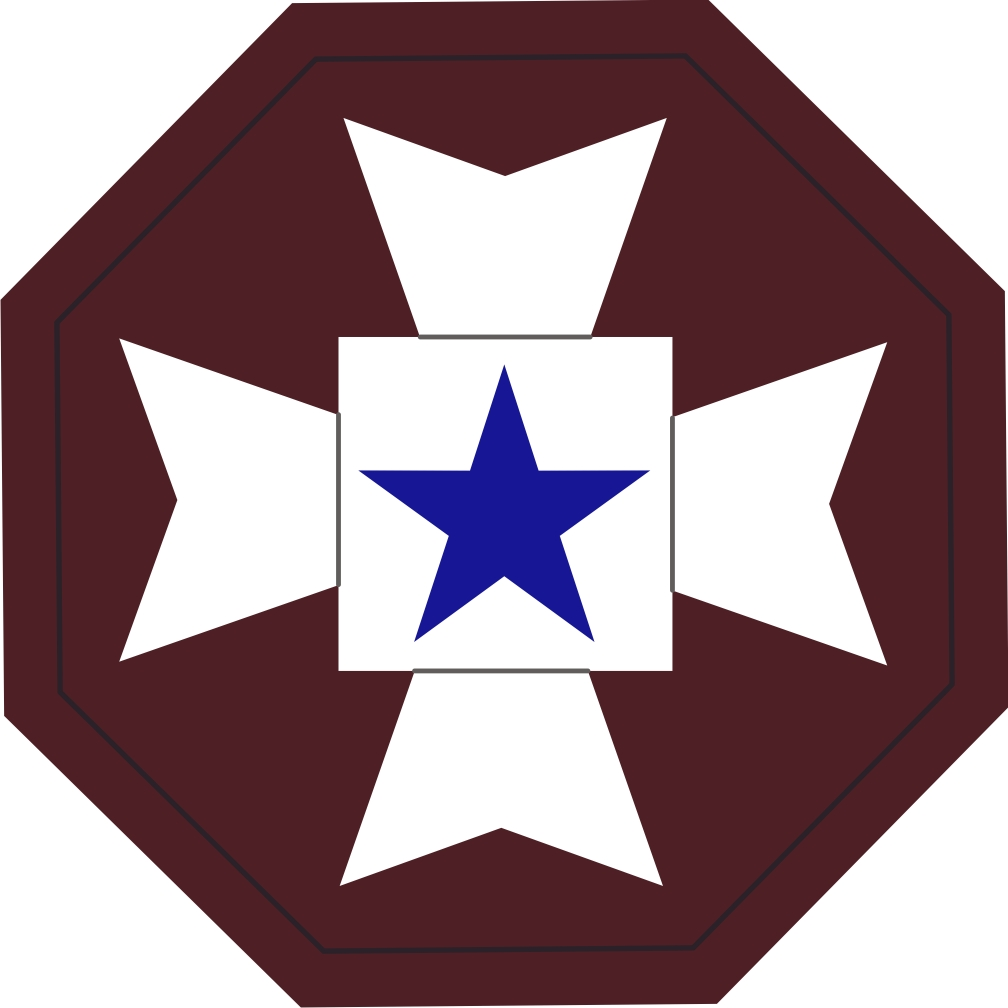
- United States Army Medical Command, Europe Shoulder Sleeve Insignia
- Active: 1 July 1968 - 21 September 1978
- Country: United States
- Allegiance: Regular Army
- Branch: U.S. Army
- Type: Medical Command
- Role: Echelon/Roles 3 and 4 Health Service Support to the U.S. Army Europe
- Garrison/HQ: Nachrichten Kasserne, Heidelberg, Germany
- Colors: Maroon and White

Commanders
- Notable commanders: Major General Marshall E. McCabe

The United States Army Medical Command, Europe (USAMEDCOMEUR) formerly provided Echelon/Roles 3 and 4 Health Service Support to units of the United States Army Europe. It was a Table of Distribution and Allowances organization that consolidated Role 3 and 4 Health Service Support under a single command. Upon the inactivation of the United States Army Medical Command, Europe in 1978, the Role 4 mission was assumed by the 7th Medical Command, while the Role 3 mission was assumed by the 68th Medical Group in support of the V Corps and the 30th Medical Group in support of the VII Corps.

== Lineage ==
- Organized in the Regular Army as Headquarters and Headquarters Company, United States Army Medical Command, Europe (Provisional) on 1 July 1968 in Germany
- Constituted 1 January 1969 in the Regular Army as Headquarters and Headquarters Company, United States Army Medical Command, Europe and activated in Germany
- Inactivated 21 September 1978 in Germany

== History ==
The USAMEDCOMEUR was activated as a provisional organization in Heidelberg, Federal Republic of Germany, on 1 July 1968 as part of the Command, Control and Logistics System 1970. Initially assigned to USAMEDCOMEUR were the 9th Hospital Center, its hospitals, dispensaries and activities; the US Army Veterinary Detachment, Europe; the 8th Finance Disbursing Section; the 10th Medical Laboratory; the 26th Medical Detachment (Illustration); the USAREUR Medical Regulating Office; the 655th Medical Company (Blood Bank); the USAREUR Preventive Medicine Detachment; the 8000th Civilian Labor Group; and the Benelux (SHAPE) Medical Service Area.

The headquarters was organized by combining the personnel assigned to the Office of the Surgeon, HQ, USAREUR and Seventh Army with the HQ, US Army Communications Zone, Europe Hospital Center (Provisional) and elements of the HQ, 9th Hospital Center.

The commanding general of the medical command continued to serve as the theater surgeon and his staff provided medical support to HQ, USAREUR and Seventh Army. The Medical Command headquarters was located at Nachrichten Kasserne, Heidelberg, in the building formerly occupied by the 9th Hospital Center headquarters; the 9th Hospital Center headquarters, in turn, relocated to Marceau Kasserne, Landstuhl.

The Medical Command's mission was to provide health service support to the 400,000-plus military personnel and dependents and to have the capability to provide support to combat forces after the transition to combat operations.

Once fully operational, the command would control all medical functions, facilities, and resources in USAREUR and Seventh Army except those organic to major troop units. The reorganization was expected to provide greater flexibility in meeting requirements for the Army Medical Service in Europe, while health service support of "NATO committed forces" remained unchanged.

On 1 October 1968, the 7th Medical Brigade with its major units—the 30th and 31st Medical Groups and the 421st Medical Company (Air Ambulance)—was added to the Command. On that same date, the Medical Depot at Einsiedlerhof and the medical section of the Supply and Maintenance Agency were formed into the US Army Medical Materiel Center, Europe, marking the first time that all medical logistics functions in Europe were under the control of the USAREUR Chief Surgeon.

On 1 January 1969, the medical facilities in Berlin and those in Italy were assigned to USAMEDCOMEUR. The 9th Hospital Center was phased down in December 1970, and hospitals in that command became Medical Department Activities (MEDDACs) reporting directly to USAMEDCOMEUR. In March 1971, USAMEDCOMEUR became subordinate to the Theater Army Support Command (TASCOM), while the Office of the Chief Surgeon remained an integral part of Headquarters, USAREUR. On 21 July 1973, the 7th Medical Brigade was inactivated and the 30th and 31st Medical Groups, the 421st Medical Company and all other units subordinate to the 7th Medical Brigade were assigned directly to USAMEDCOMEUR.

On 1 July 1973, USAMEDCOMEUR was relieved from assignment to TASCOM and became a major subordinate command of USAREUR. On 1 July 1974, the Teheran MEDDAC was activated and assumed responsibility for Army medical support in the Middle East area. On 1 April 1975, the 31st Medical Group was inactivated, placing all combat support hospitals and other field medical units under the 30th Medical Group.

== Shoulder Sleeve Insignia ==
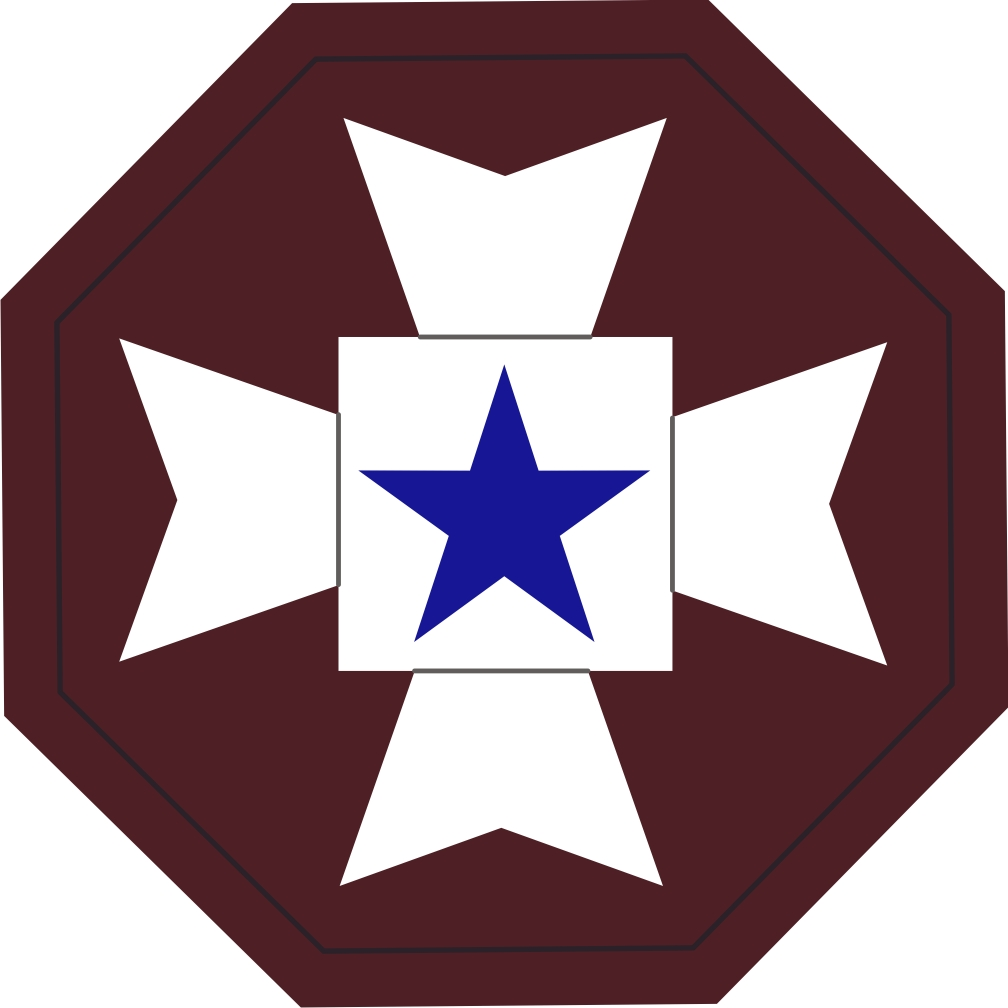
Shoulder Sleeve Insignia, United States Army Medical Command, Europe

=== Description ===
On a maroon octagon 2 1/4 inches (5.7 cm) in height and 2 1/4 inches (5.7 cm) in width a white Maltese cross with a white square at its center charged with a blue five-pointed star with one point up.

=== Symbolism ===
White and maroon are the colors of the Medical Department. The Maltese cross is a symbol which has been associated with medicine since medieval times as an emblem of the Knights Hospitallers. The octagon is symbolic of health and regeneration, and the star alludes to the command function.

=== Background ===
The shoulder sleeve insignia was approved on 6 May 1970. (TIOH Dwg. No. A-1-538)

== Distinctive unit insignia ==
No Distinctive unit insignia was authorized for the United States Army Medical Command, Europe by the United States Army Institute of Heraldry.

== Combat Service Identification Badge ==
No Combat Service Identification Badge was authorized for the United States Army Medical Command, Europe by the United States Army Institute of Heraldry.

== Commanders ==
All commanders of the 7th Medical Command were Medical Corps officers.

Image	Rank	Name	Begin date	End date	Notes
James T. McGiboney	James T. McGiboney	Major General	17 July 1968	1 September 1970	McGiboney assumed command of the U.S. Army Medical Command (Provisional).
Frederic J. Hughes, Jr.	Frederic J. Hughes, Jr.	Major general	1 September 1970	31 March 1974	Frederic J. Hughes Jr. commanded the Walter Reed General Hospital during Dwight David Eisenhower's final illness and provided him personal care on a daily basis. He retired out of the USAMEDCOMEUR position on 31 March 1974.
Philip A. Deffer	Phillip A. Deffer	Brigadier general	1 April 1974	April 1974	Deffer had been serving as the deputy commander of USAMEDCOMEUR as a Colonel. He was promoted to Brigadier General on 1 April 1974, and assumed command of the MEDCOM upon the retirement of MG Hughes until MG McCabe "assume[d] command of Medical Command in Mid-April."
Marshall E. McCabe	Marshall E. McCabe	Major general	April 1974	October 1977	McCabe would assume command of the United States Army Health Services Command after leaving Europe
Spencer B. Reid	Spencer B. Reid	Major general	October 1977	21 September 1978	Reid would assume command of the 7th Medical Command upon its activation
