= 7th Medical Command =

Former medical command of the U.S. Army stationed in Germany (1978-1994)

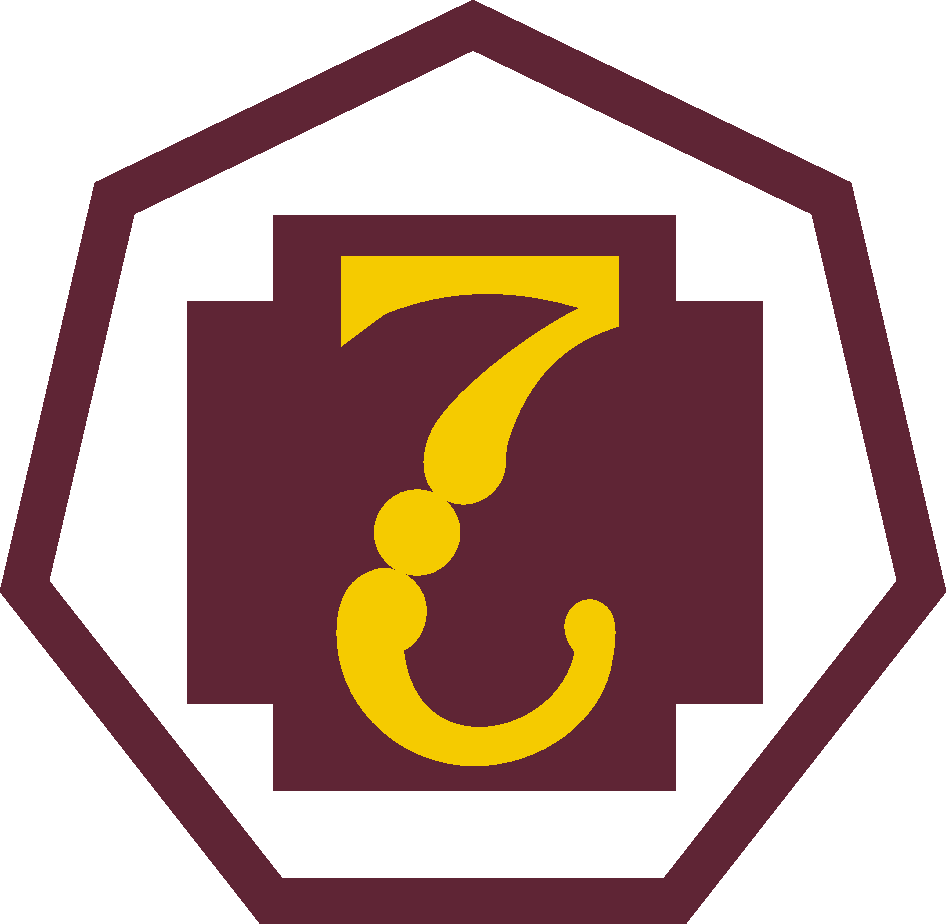
- 7th Medical Command Shoulder Sleeve Insignia
- Active: 21 September 1978 - 15 October 1994
- Country: United States
- Allegiance: Regular Army
- Branch: U.S. Army
- Type: Medical Command
- Role: Echelon/Role 4 Health Service Support to the U.S. Army, Europe
- Garrison/HQ: Nachrichten Kasserne, Heidelberg, Germany
- Motto: The Seventh Serves
- Colors: Maroon and White

Commanders
- Notable commanders: LTG Quinn H. Becker; LTG Frank F. Ledford

Insignia
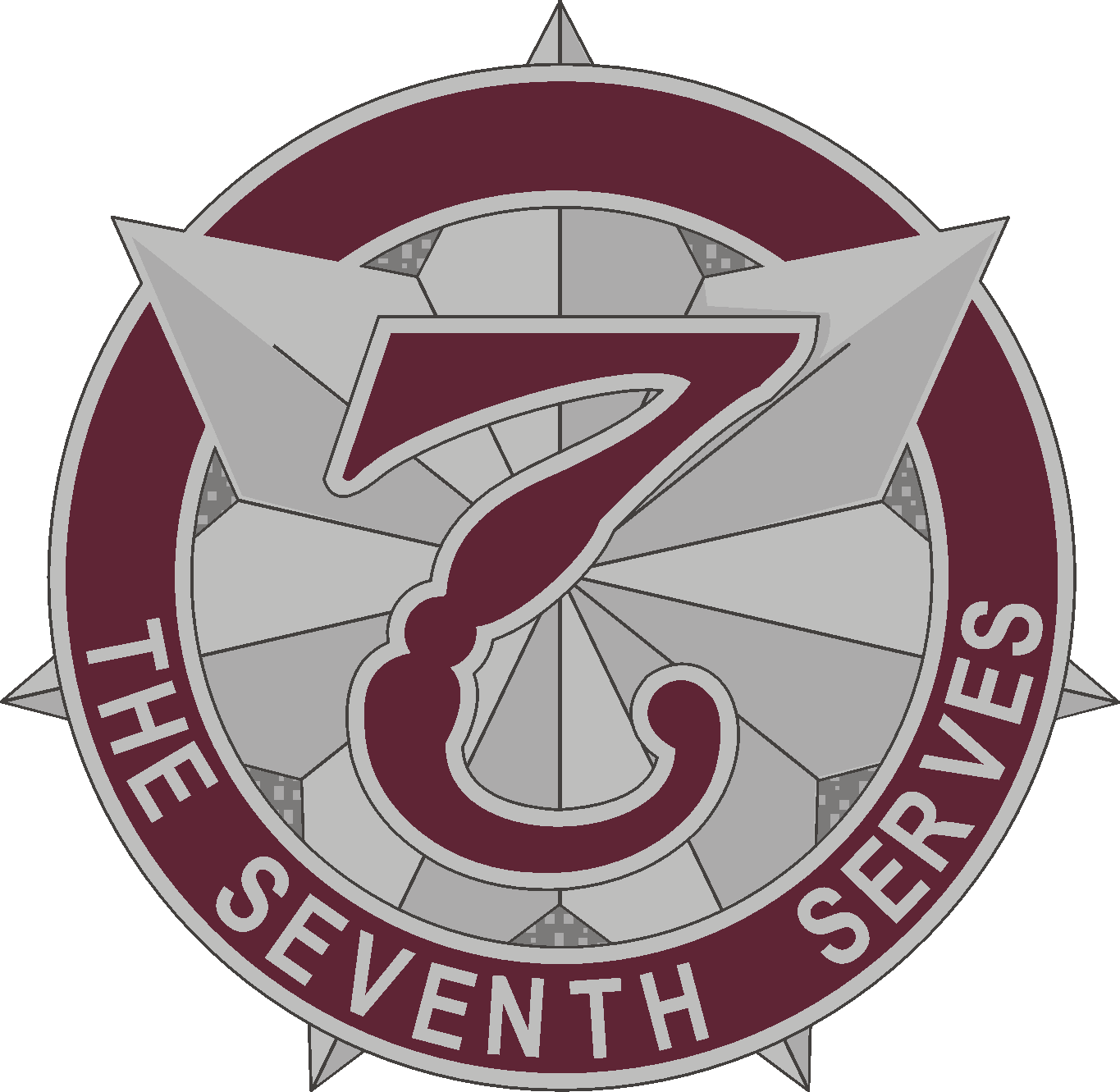
- Distinctive unit insignia

The 7th Medical Command provided Echelon/Role 4 Health Service Support to units of the United States Army Europe. It was a Table of organization and equipment organization that replaced the United States Army Medical Command, Europe, a Table of distribution and allowances-based organization that had provided both Role 3 and Role 4 Health Service Support from 1970 to 1978. Upon the inactivation of the 7th Medical Command in 1994, the Role 4 mission was assumed by the United States Army Medical Command through its European Health Service Support Area, while the remaining Role 3 mission was assumed by the 30th Medical Brigade.

== Lineage ==
- Constituted 21 September 1978 in the regular Army as Headquarters and Headquarters Company, 7th Medical Command and activated in Germany
- Inactivated 15 October 1994 in Germany

== Honors ==
=== Campaign participation credit ===
- None

=== Decorations ===
- None

== History ==
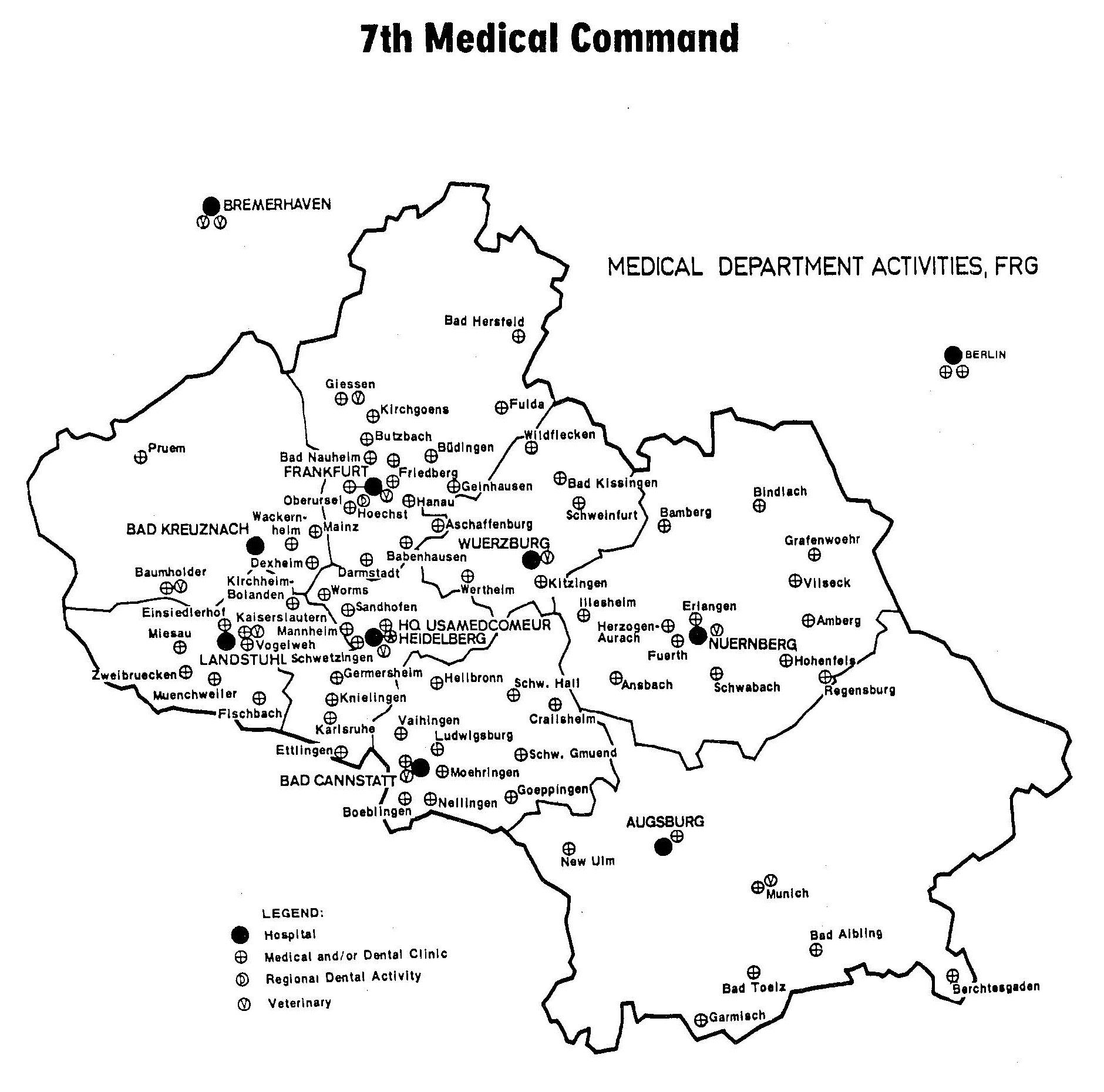
Map showing the location of 7th Medical Command facilities as of late 1978, immediately after stand-up

With its activation on 21 September 1978, the 7th Medical Command became the first unit of its type in the US Army. It would be joined by the 18th Medical Command on 16 August 1984, the 3d Medical Command on 16 September 1990, and the 807th Medical Command on 17 September 2002.

The basic mission of the 7th Medical Command was to be prepared to provide medical support to US Army Forces in the European Theater in the event of war and to provide peacetime health care services within the theater. The significance of the 7th Medical Command designation was that this wartime mission was being recognized as an on-going task, and the necessary equipment and personnel for the combat role were identified. Thus, the reorganization under the 7th Medical Command banner had a direct effect on the unit's readiness for combat. The predecessor organization of the 7th Medical Command—the US Army Medical Command, Europe (USAMEDCOMEUR)—did not have the necessary equipment and personnel authorized for a combat mission, although many of the subordinate units and activities remained the same.

The USAMEDCOMEUR was activated in Heidelberg, Federal Republic of Germany, on 1 July 1968 as part of the Command, Control and Logistics System 1970. Initially assigned to USAMEDCOMEUR were the 9th Hospital Center, its hospitals, dispensaries and activities; the US Army Veterinary Detachment, Europe; the 8th Finance Disbursing Section; the 10th Medical Laboratory; the 26th Medical Detachment (Illustration); the USAREUR Medical Regulating Office; the 655th Medical Company (Blood Bank); the USAREUR Preventive Medicine Detachment; the 8000th Civilian Labor Group; and the Benelux (SHAPE) Medical Service Area.

On 1 October 1968, the 7th Medical Brigade with its major units—the 30th and 31st Medical Groups and the 421st Medical Company (Air Ambulance)—was added to the Command. On that same date, the Medical Depot at Einsiedlerhof and the medical section of the Supply and Maintenance Agency were formed into the US Army Medical Materiel Center, Europe, marking the first time that all medical logistics functions in Europe were under the control of the USAREUR Chief Surgeon.

On 1 January 1969, the medical facilities in Berlin and those in Italy were assigned to USAMEDCOMEUR. The 9th Hospital Center was phased down in December 1970, and hospitals in that command became Medical Department Activities (MEDDACs) reporting directly to USAMEDCOMEUR. In March 1971, USAMEDCOMEUR became subordinate to the Theater Army Support Command (TASCOM), while the Office of the Chief Surgeon remained an integral part of Headquarters, USAREUR. On 21 July 1973, the 7th Medical Brigade was inactivated and the 30th and 31st Medical Groups, the 421st Medical Company and all other units subordinate to the 7th Medical Brigade were assigned directly to USAMEDCOMEUR.

On 1 July 1973, USAMEDCOMEUR was relieved from assignment to TASCOM and became a major subordinate command of USAREUR. On 1 July 1974, the Teheran MEDDAC was activated and assumed responsibility for Army medical support in the Middle East area. On 1 April 1975, the 31st Medical Group was inactivated, placing all combat support hospitals and other field medical units under the 30th Medical Group.

On 21 October 1978, in another major move to improve combat readiness, another medical group—the 68th Medical Group—was reactivated and certain medical units previously assigned to USAMEDCOMEUR (such as ground ambulance companies and combat support hospitals) came under the command & control of the V and VII Corps. The 68th Medical Group assumed command of units providing V Corps Role III support, and the 30th Medical Group assumed command of units providing VII Corps Role III support. The 421st Medical Company(Air Ambulance) remained under the control of the 7th Medical Command and continued to provide air ambulance service throughout the theater.

After the completion of the actions in October 1978, the 7th Medical Command controlled all fixed medical and dental activities throughout the European Theater, provided medical care services to members of the US Forces and their dependents, and maintained a readiness for combat.

== Shoulder Sleeve Insignia ==
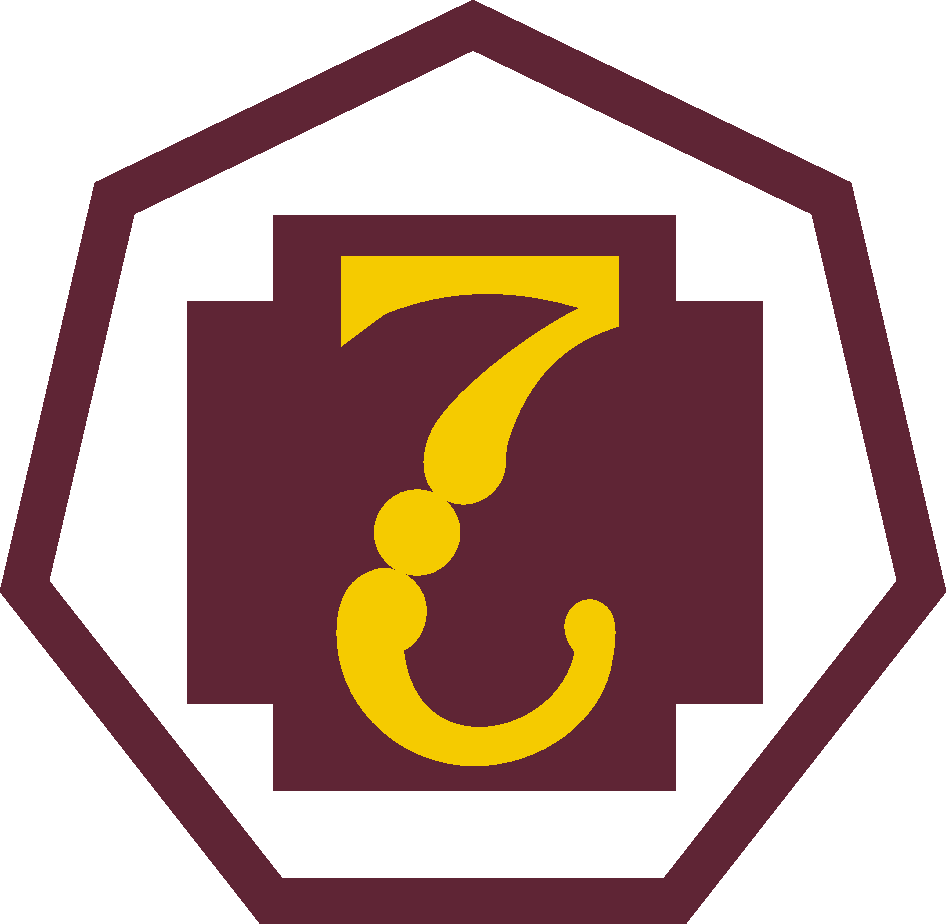
Shoulder Sleeve Insignia, 7th Medical Command

=== Description ===
A heptagonal device 2 1/2 inches (6.4 cm) in diameter, with one angle at top center, consisting of a maroon cross humetty on a white background bearing a yellow fleam, all within a 1/8 inch (0.32 cm) maroon border.

=== Symbolism ===
The colors maroon and white, in conjunction with the cross, are indicative of the unit's medical mission. The fleam is a heraldic symbol for a surgical lancet and its form simulates the unit's numerical designation, which is repeated in the shape of the device.

=== Background ===
The shoulder sleeve insignia was approved on 19 October 1978. (TIOH Drawing Number A-1-626)

== Distinctive unit insignia ==
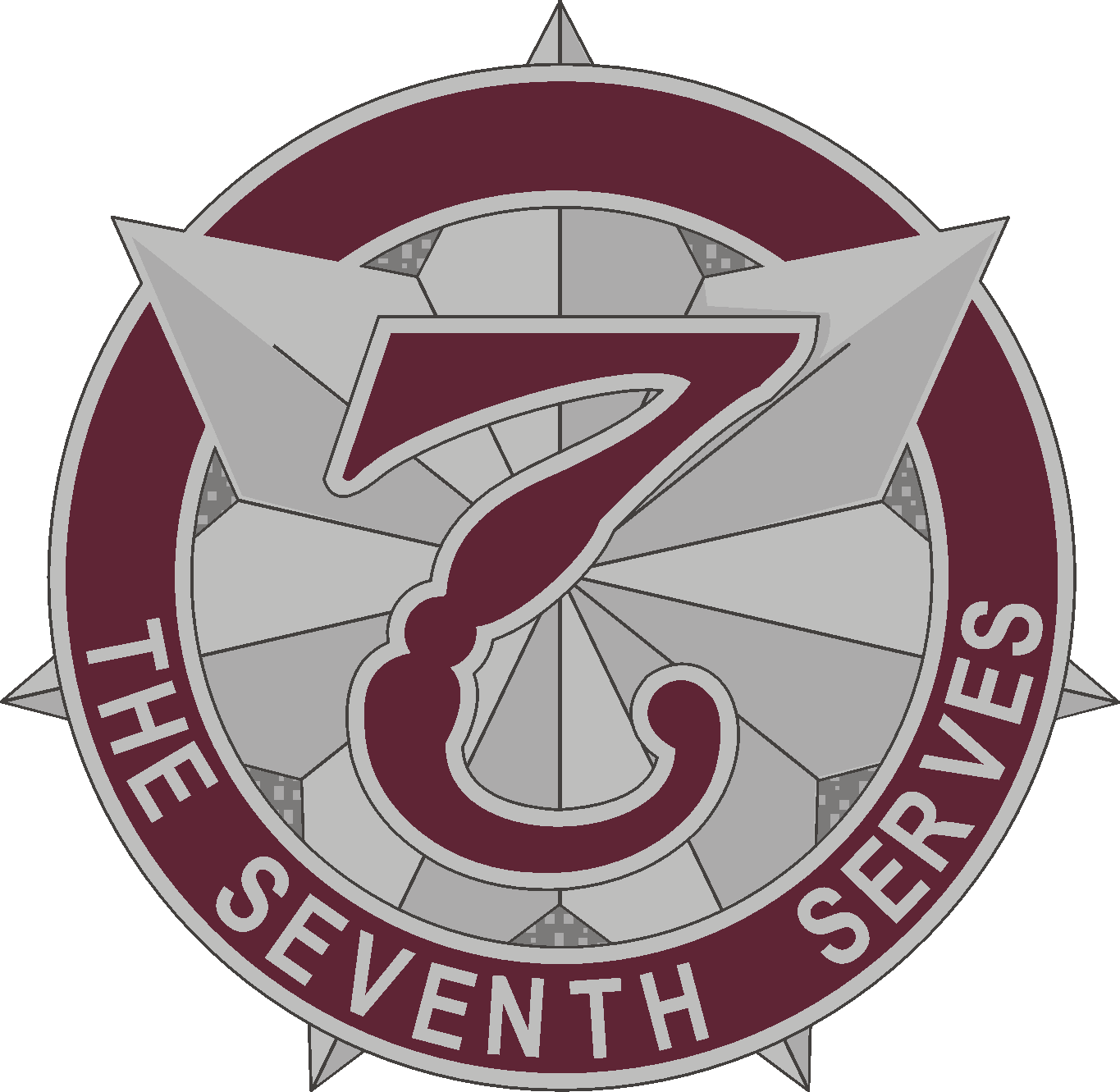
Distinctive Unit Insignia, 7th Medical Command

=== Description ===
A silver color metal and enamel device 1 3/16 inches (3.0 cm) in height overall consisting of a seven-pointed silver star, one point up, bearing in center a maroon fleam and interwoven through the points of the star a circular maroon scroll inscribed in base "THE SEVENTH SERVES" in silver letters.

=== Symbolism ===
The colors maroon and white are traditional to the Medical Corps. The fleam is a heraldic symbol for a surgical lancet and its form simulates the unit's numerical designation; the star alludes to the command position of the unit.

=== Background ===
The distinctive unit insignia was approved on 4 December 1978.

== Combat Service Identification Badge ==
No Combat Service Identification Badge was authorized for the 7th Medical Command by the United States Army Institute of Heraldry.

== Commanders ==
All commanders of the 7th Medical Command were Medical Corps officers.

Image	Rank	Name	Begin date	End date	Notes
Spencer B. Reid	Spencer B. Reid	Major General	21 September 1978	February 1981	Reid had been serving as Commander, United States Army Medical Command, Europe
Floyd W. Baker	Floyd W. Baker	Major General	March 1981	June 1983	
Quinn H. Becker	Quinn H. Becker	Major General	July 1983	February 1985	Army Surgeon General February 1, 1985 – May 31, 1988
Frank F. Ledford	Frank F. Ledford Jr.	Major General	March 1985	June 1988	Army Surgeon General June 1, 1988 – June 30, 1992
Richard T. Travis	Richard T. Travis	Major General	July 1988	December 1990	
Michael J. Scotti, Jr.	Michael J. Scotti, Jr.	Major General	January 1991	15 October 1994	

== Deputy Commanders ==
All deputy commanders of the 7th Medical Command were Dental Corps officers, and also served as the U.S. Army Europe Chief Dental Surgeon.

Image	Rank	Name	Begin date	End date	Notes
George Kuttas	George Kuttas	Brigadier General		1979	Served as Chief, United States Army Dental Corps, 1979-1983
H. Thomas Chandler	H. Thomas Chandler	Brigadier General	March 1979	November 1982	Served as Chief, United States Army Dental Corps, December 1982-November 1986
Billy Johnson	Billy Johnson	Brigadier General	January 1983	July 1984	Died of a heart attack after PT while serving as Deputy Commander, US Army Health Services Command
Billie B. Leffler	Billie B. Leffler	Brigadier General	August 1984	November 1986	Served as Chief, United States Army Dental Corps, November 1986-November 1990
Thomas R. Tempel, Sr.	Thomas R. Tempel, Sr.	Brigadier General	January 1987	December 1990	Served as Chief, United States Army Dental Corps, December 1992-March 1996
John J. Cuddy	John J. Cuddy	Brigadier General	March 1991	July 1991	Served as Chief, United States Army Dental Corps, February 1996-December 1998
Robert E. Brady	Robert E. Brady	Brigadier General	July 1991	15 October 1994	Assumed command of the 30th Medical Brigade upon the inactivation of the 7th Medical Command.
