= General Becker =

General Becker may refer to:

- Bradley Becker (fl. 1980s–2020s), U.S. Army lieutenant general
- Carl Becker (general) (1895–1966), German Army lieutenant general
- Fritz Becker (general) (1892–1967), German Wehrmacht lieutenant general
- Hellmuth Becker (SS officer) (1902–1953), German SS brigadier general
- Quinn H. Becker (1930–2022), U.S. Army lieutenant general
