= 91st Engineer Battalion (United States) =

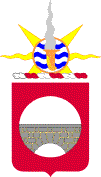
- coat of arms
- Active: 1941–1946; 1952–1971; 1992–2005; 2013–Present
- Country: United States
- Branch: United States Army Corps of Engineers
- Type: Engineer battalion
- Motto(s): Acts Not Words
- Engagements: World War II: Kokoda Track campaign New Guinea campaign Philippines campaign Yugoslav Wars Iraq War
- Decorations: Presidential Unit Citation; Meritorious Unit Commendation (2) Army Superior Unit Award

Insignia
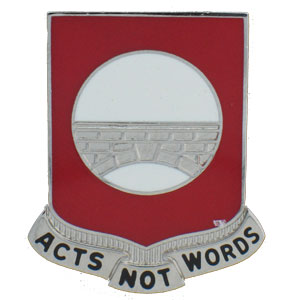
- DUI

The 91st Engineer Battalion is a military engineer unit in the United States Army. The battalion, which was composed mainly of African-American troops, served in the Pacific Theater of Operations during World War II, when it was known as the 91st Engineer General Service Regiment. After the war, the unit was deactivated as part of the demobilization process. It was reactivated in 1952 and remained in existence until the early 1970s. In 1991 it was reactivated, after which it was employed on operations in Yugoslavia, Kuwait, Chad, and Iraq before being deactivated again in 2005. On 16 October 2013, it was assigned to the 1st Brigade Combat Team, 1st Cavalry Division, and activated at Fort Hood, Texas.

== History ==
=== World War II ===
The 91st Engineer Battalion was constituted in the Regular Army on 1 October 1933 as the 50th Engineer Battalion (Separate). It was redesignated the 91st Engineer Battalion (Separate) on 1 January 1938, but it was not until 10 February 1941 that it was activated at Camp Shelby, Mississippi.

On 20 July 1941, it left Camp Shelby to participate in the Louisiana Maneuvers. It bivouacked near Lake Charles, Louisiana, and was engaged in the construction and improvement of airports, roads and railheads. On 20 October, it moved to an area near Camp Claiborne, Louisiana, where it worked on constructing a railroad between Fort Polk and Camp Claiborne.

The 91st Engineer Battalion (Separate) departed the New York Port of Embarkation on 4 March 1942 and arrived in Brisbane on 9 April. The unit worked on airfields around Woodstock, Queensland and Giru, Queensland. On 10 July, it was redesignated the 91st Engineer Regiment (General Service), before becoming the 91st Engineer General Service Regiment on 6 August 1942.

The regiment began moving to Port Moresby in August 1942, but the 1st Battalion did not arrive until 19 December. In the Port Moresby area, the 91st Engineer General Service Regiment worked on the Durand Airfield, a water supply system using water from Laloki River, and road building. The regiment moved up to Townsville, Queensland where it continued airbase construction activities. The regiment received a Presidential Unit Citation for its service in Papua from 23 July 1942 to 23 January 1943. By December 1943, it was the only major US engineer unit in the Port Moresby area, and was charged with a full range of base maintenance functions. The 91st Engineer General Service Regiment arrived on Biak on 8 October 1944. It moved to the Philippines on 25 August 1945, where it was inactivated on 20 January 1946. It received a Meritorious Unit Commendation for the period from 1 January 1944 to 10 April 1945.

=== Post World War II ===
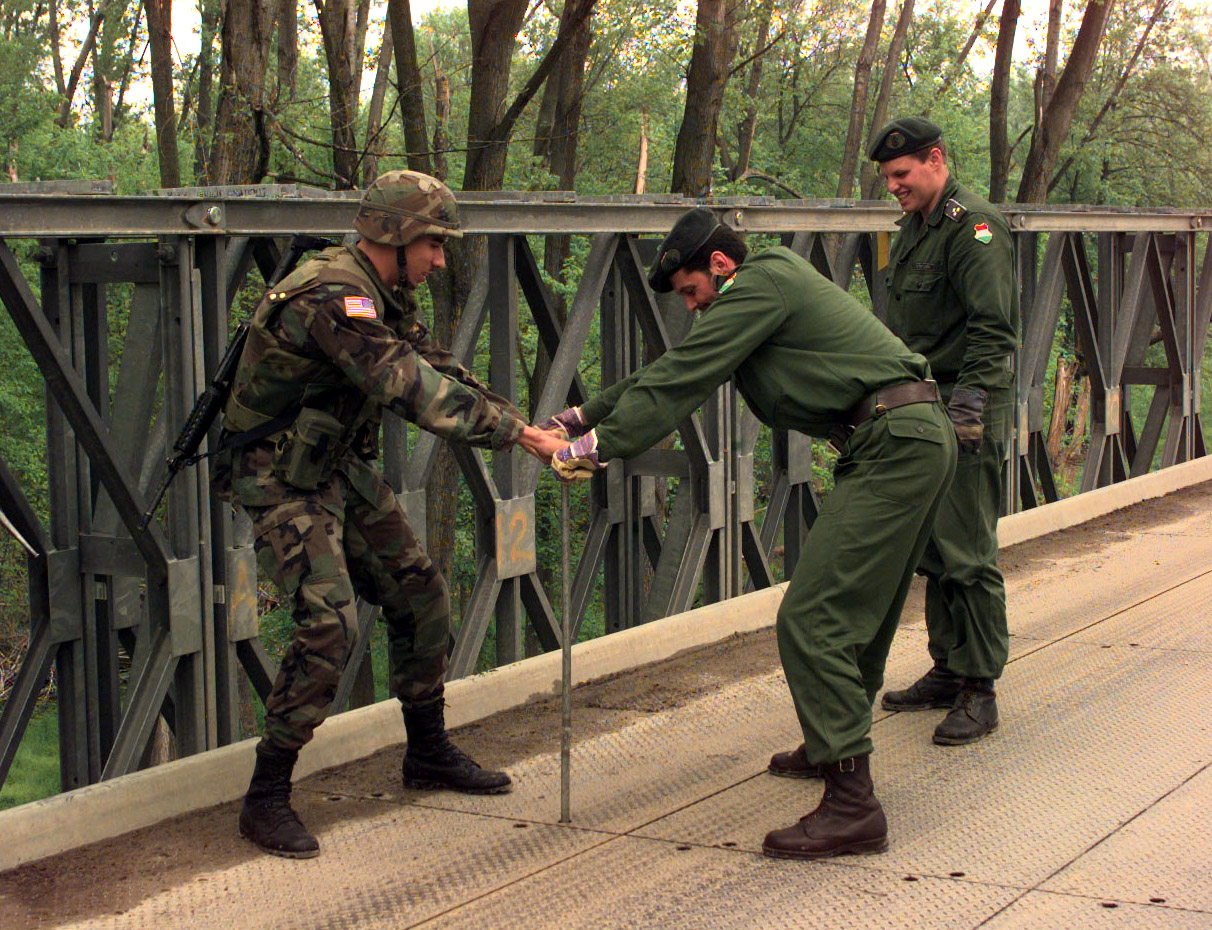
A member of the battalion working with Hungarian Army Engineers on the Brcko Bridge in Bosnia and Herzegovina, on 26 April 1999

On 28 November 1951, the 91st Engineer General Service Regiment was redesignated the 91st Engineer Combat Battalion, and on 14 January 1952 it was reactivated at Fort Belvoir, Virginia. It was redesignated the 91st Engineer Battalion (Combat) on 20 May 1953. It remained at Fort Belvoir until it was inactivated on 20 May 1971.

The 91st Engineer Battalion was reactivated at Fort Hood, Texas, on 16 October 1992, this time as part of the 1st Cavalry Division. Parts of the battalion served in Bosnia and Herzegovina during the Yugoslav Wars, and in 1995 deployed to Kuwait as part of Operation Intrinsic Action. A company also served in Chad. In November 2001, Alpha Company deployed to Kuwait as part of Operation Enduring Freedom. From January 2004 to January 2005, the 91st Engineer Battalion served in Iraq as part of Operation Iraqi Freedom, for which it was awarded a second Meritorious Unit Commendation. The battalion was assigned an area of operations encompassing most of the Mansour District of Baghdad, including the neighborhoods of Ghazilyah, Al Shula, Al Khadra, and Al Amiriyah. 5 soldiers from the battalion were killed during combat operations.

The 91st Engineer Battalion was deactivated at Fort Hood on 8 July 2005 as a result of the transformation of the United States Army. On 16 October 2013, it was assigned to the 1st Brigade Combat Team, 1st Cavalry Division, and activated at Fort Hood, Texas.

== Distinctive unit insignia ==
- Description

A silver color metal and enamel device 1 1/8 inches (2.86 cm) in height overall consisting of a shield blazoned: Gules, a plate charged throughout with a masoned stone arched bridge Proper. Attached below the shield is a scroll inscribed "ACTS NOT WORDS" in black letters.

- Symbolism

Red and white are colors associated with the Corps of Engineers, and the masoned bridge represents Engineering accomplishment.

- Background

The distinctive unit insignia was approved on 22 Nov 1939.

== Coat of arms ==
=== Blazon ===
- Shield

Gules, a plate charged throughout with a masoned stone arch bridge Proper.

- Crest

From a wreath Argent and Gules a demi-sunburst Or charged with a fountain fimbriated Tenné, overall an Indonesian kris hilt to base Proper. Motto ACTS NOT WORDS

=== Symbolism ===
- Shield

The shield is red with a plate (white), which are the colors of the Corps of Engineers, and the masoned bridge charged thereon represents Engineering accomplishment.

- Crest

The demi-sunburst refers to World War II campaigns in the East Indies. The fountain represents the Pacific Ocean and the Asiatic-Pacific theater of the war. The kris, a typical weapon of Indonesia and Papua, symbolizes that region of the Pacific and its significance during World War II. Gold denotes excellence.

- Background

The coat of arms was originally approved on 22 Nov 1939. It was amended on 16 Mar 1999 to add a crest.

== See also ==
- Coats of arms of U.S. Engineer Battalions
