= 115th Brigade Support Battalion =

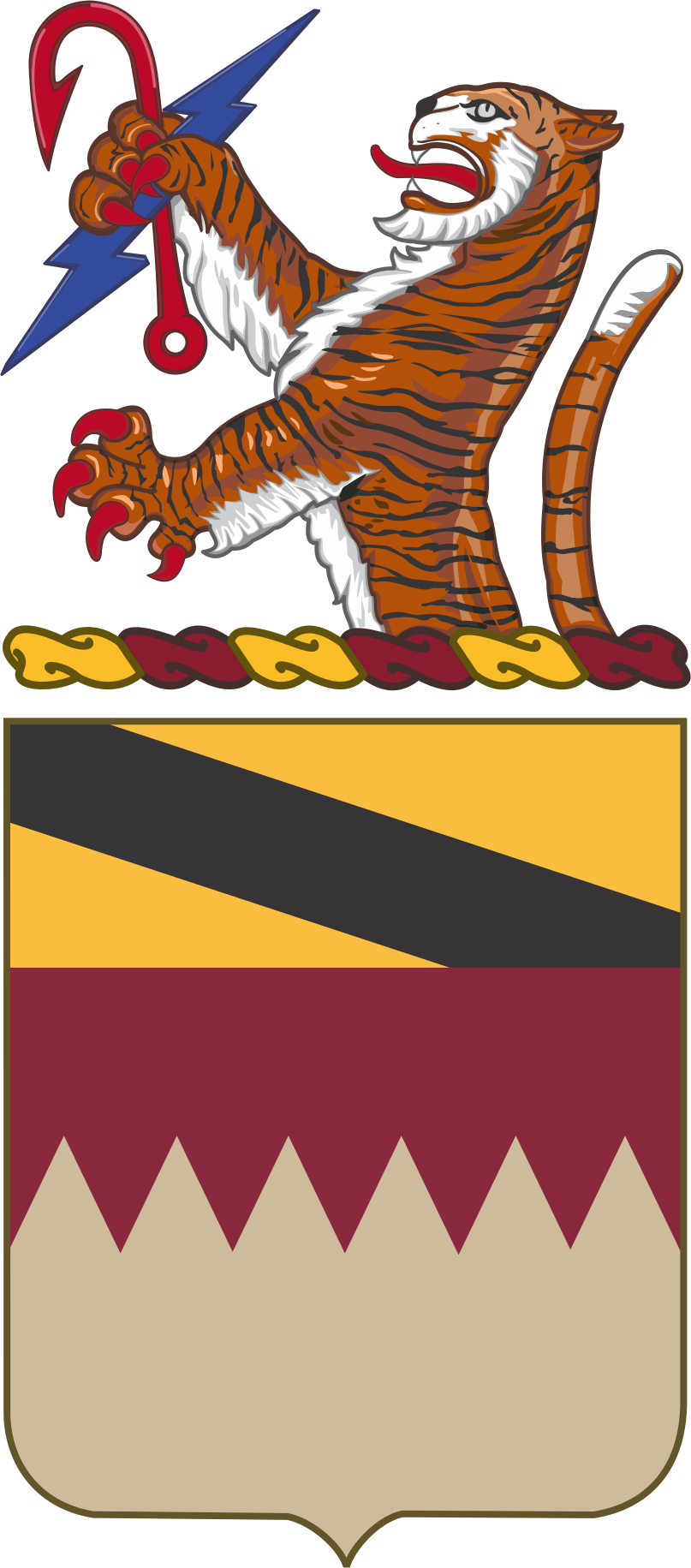
- Coat of arms
- Country: United States
- Branch: United States Army
- Type: Support Battalion
- Garrison/HQ: Fort Cavazos
- Motto: Mule Skinners
- Colors: Buff, Red, Gold

Insignia
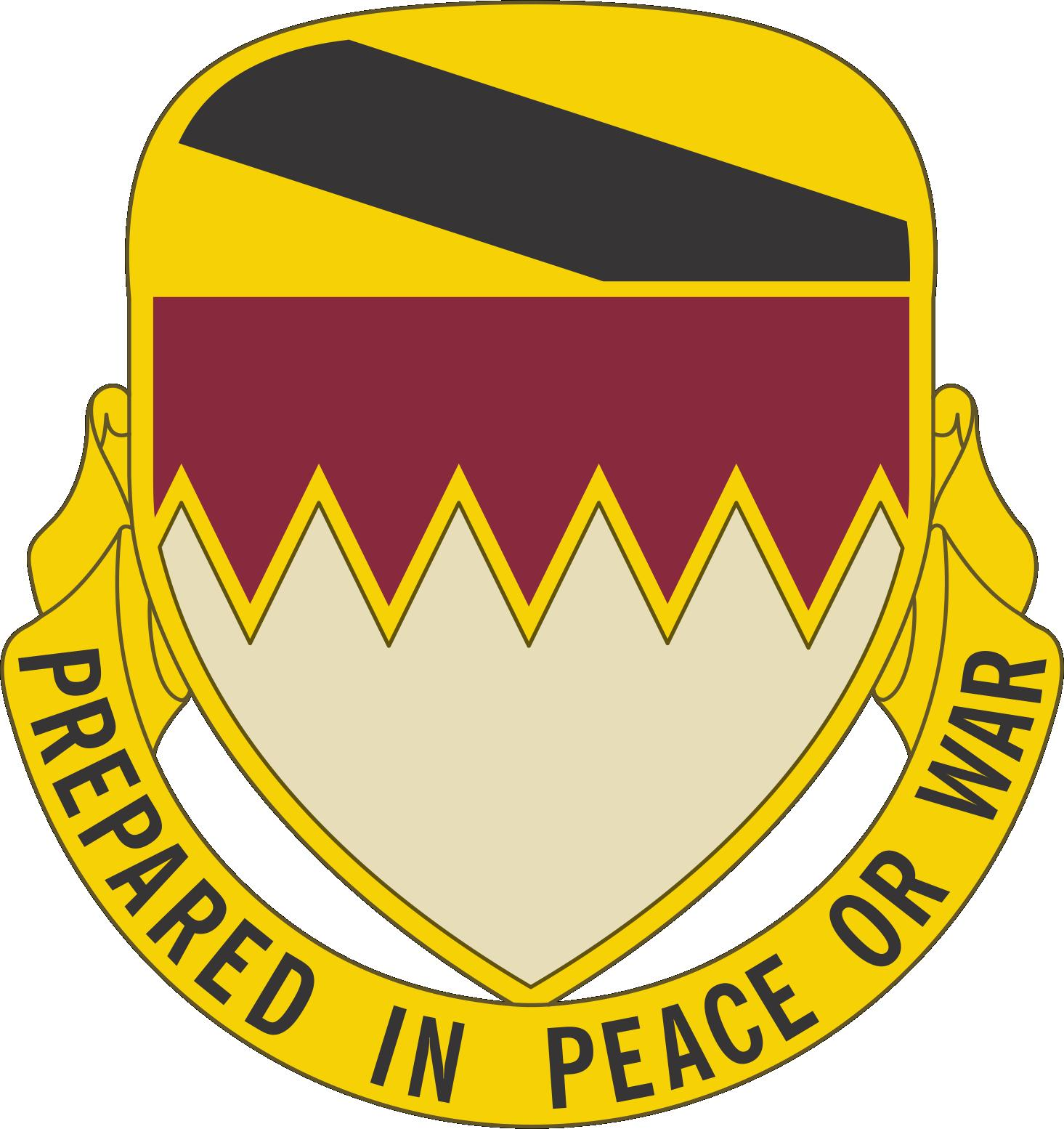
- Distinctive Unit Insignia

The 115th Brigade Support Battalion is a battalion of the United States Army. Organized at Camp Henry Knox, Kentucky in 1919 as the 657th Motor Transport Company, it was re-designated the 84th Motor Transport Company on 1 December 1919. Since that time, many re-designations have occurred as the United States Army has changed.

== History ==
=== Interwar years ===
The 115th Brigade Support Battalion carries the history, lineage, and colors of the 15th Supply Transport Battalion. It was originally organized at Camp Henry Knox, Kentucky in 1919 as the 657th Motor Transport Company, it was re-designated the 84th Motor Transport Company on 1 December 1919 and demobilized 31 December 1920 at Camp Dix, New Jersey. The unit was reconstituted 1 May 1936 in the Regular Army as Troop D, 16th Quartermaster Squadron, an element of the 1st Cavalry Division.

=== World War II ===
Troop D, 16th Quartermaster Squadron, activated 15 January 1941 at Fort Ringgold, Texas. The troop traveled with the division throughout its World War II campaigns in the Pacific theater earning campaign credit for Bismarck Archipelago, Leyte, Luzon, and New Guinea as well as two Meritorious Unit Commendations for actions in support of the 1st Cavalry Division.

Troop D was moving with the division when it earned its initial first designation, "First in Manila" during the campaign to retake the Philippine Islands. As the Japanese worsened due to the nuclear bombs dropped on Hiroshima and Nagasaki, Troop D marched into Japan when the division achieved its second motto, "First in Tokyo". During the occupation, the troop became the quartermaster support unit for the division.

=== Korean War ===
In 1949, the troop became the 15th Quartermaster Company and moved to Korea in 1950 to participate in combat supplying of the 5th, 7th, and 3rd Cavalry Regiments, Division Artillery, and Special Troops. The 15th Quartermaster Company fought with the division north across the 38th Parallel. In the invasion of North Korea, the First Team’s third accolade, "First in Pyong Yang" was added to the battle honors of the division and its quartermaster company.

The 15th Quartermaster Company remained in Korea after the war and with the activation of "ROAD" division in 1963 was combined with the 23rd Transportation Battalion and re-designated as the 15th Supply and Transport Battalion.

=== Vietnam War ===
In 1965, the 15th Supply and Transport Battalion returned to Fort Benning, Georgia with the 1st Cavalry Division and organized as a part of the Army’s first airmobile division. From 1 July 1971 until the end of the year, the unit served in the Republic of Vietnam. During its tenure in Vietnam, it participated in many campaigns to include the Tet Counteroffensive. While in Vietnam, the 15th Supply and Transport Battalion received the Presidential Unit Citation, the Valorous Unit Award, three Meritorious Unit Commendations, and three Republic of Vietnam Crosses of Gallantry and the Republic of Vietnam Civil Actions Honor Medal.

=== Cold War ===
Upon its return to the United States in 1971, the 15th Supply and Transport Battalion and the 1st Cavalry Division moved to Fort Hood under the TRICAP concept. In January 1975, the 1st Cavalry Division was reorganized, becoming the Army’s newest armored division. The 15th Supply and Transport Battalion adapted itself quickly to meet the ever-changing logistical needs of the division.

In 1984, the entire structure of the Division Support Command (DISCOM) underwent a dynamic change. Support battalions were activated, incorporating previous elements of the 15th Supply and Transport Battalion, the 15th Medical Battalion, and the 27th Maintenance Battalion. These units had previously provided brigade-level combat service support as forward area support teams; thus was born the 1st Forward Support Battalion on 1 October 1984. The 1st Forward Support Battalion took on the mission of supporting 1st Brigade, 1st Cavalry Division.

Under the initial support battalion concept, the newly formed battalions had no history and lineage and only generic colors. This problem was corrected in 1987 when the Department of the Army and the Institute of Heraldry re-designated all support battalions. The 1st Forward Support Battalion became the 115th Support Battalion (Forward) on 15 May 1987 and given the full lineage, honors and colors of 15th Supply and Transport Battalion.

=== Gulf War ===
In October 1990, the 115th Forward Support Battalion deployed to Saudi Arabia for Operations Desert Shield and Desert Storm and provided logistical support to the soldiers of the 1st Brigade Task Force. During Operation Desert Storm, traversing 260 kilometers into the heart of Iraq, the 115th Forward Support Battalion met the challenge of providing continuous logistical support.

In the spring of 2003, the 1st Cavalry Division was organized under the FORCE XXI structure. The creation of multi-functional logistics companies with the FORCE XXI Forward Support Battalion consolidates all classes of supply and maintenance organizational elements currently embedded within the maneuver battalions with the direct support capability currently in the Forward Support Battalion.

The new 115th Forward Support Battalion, with "centralized" combat service support, provides all logistical support, and tied together the entire spectrum of supplies and services for the maneuver battalions within the 1st Brigade Combat Team (BCT). It consisted of three forward support companies (FSCs), a brigade support company, a medical company, and a headquarters and distribution company.

=== Modern era ===
In March 2004, the 115th Forward Support Battalion deployed to the Persian Gulf for Operation Iraqi Freedom II. The battalion faced new tasks and challenges as it adapted to the rapidly changing environment in and around Baghdad during their year-long deployment. The 115th Forward Support Battalion then provided successful logistical support to the 1st Brigade Combat Team during periods of intense combat in Sadr City, and during the landmark first free Iraqi election.

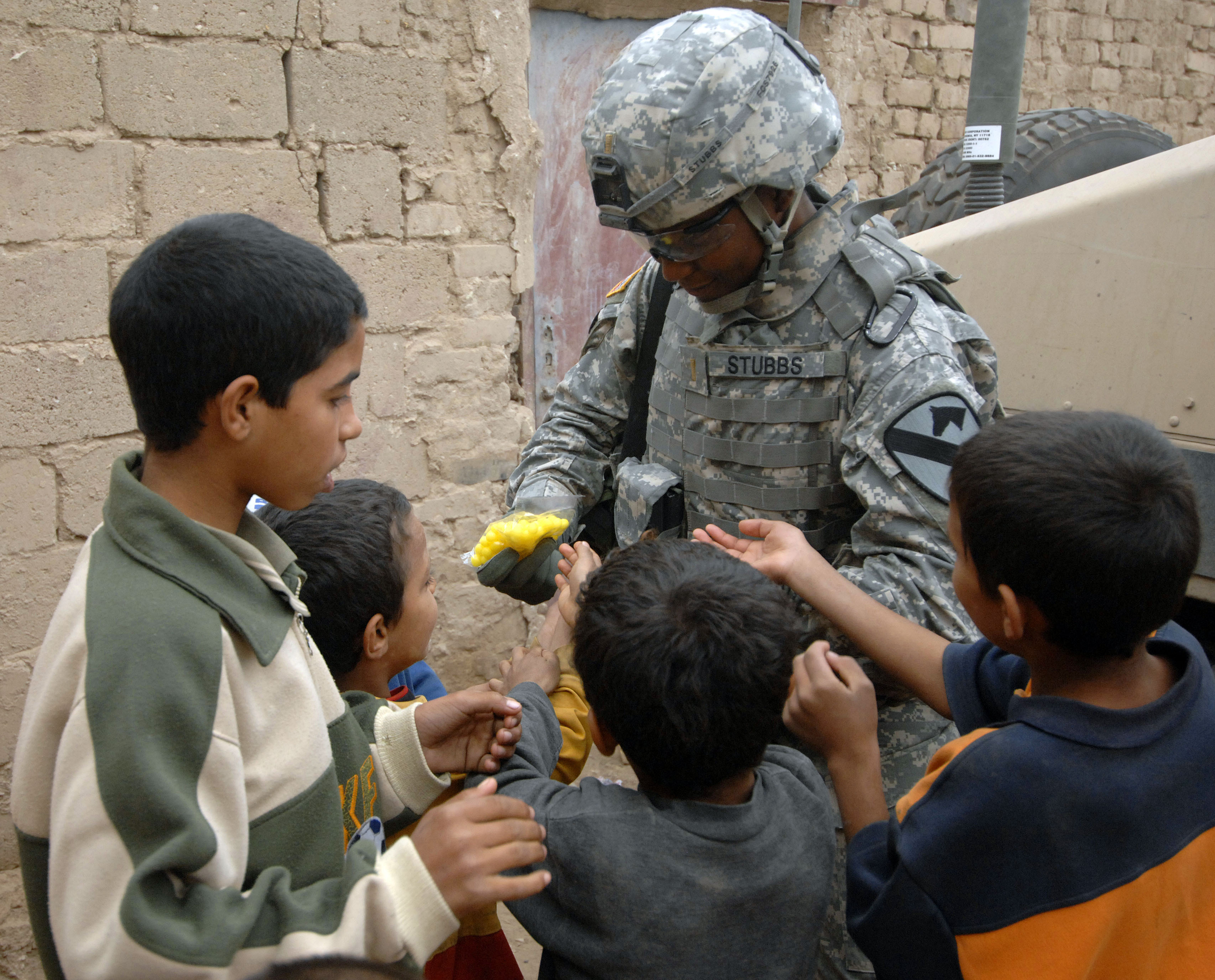
115th in Iraq 2007

In 2005, the Army moved from a division-based force structure to brigade-based. The 1st Brigade Combat Team re-structured as Interim Brigade Combat Team, incorporating the previous elements of the 1st Battalion, 82d Field Artillery Regiment; 312th Military Intelligence Battalion; 20th Engineer Battalion; 13th Signal Battalion; and 115th Forward Support Battalion.

On 12 July 2005, the 115th Forward Support Battalion became the 115th Brigade Support Battalion and re-aligned from DISCOM to the 1st Brigade Combat Team under the new structural concept. The 115th Brigade Support Battalion provides distribution-based, centrally-managed combat service support to 1st Brigade Combat Team to sustain its operational employment in small scale contingencies.

== Awards and decorations ==
=== Campaign credit ===
Conflict	Streamer	Years
World War II	Bismarck Archipelago	
World War II	Leyte	
World War II	Luzon	
World War II	New Guinea	
Vietnam War		

=== Unit decorations ===
Ribbon	Award	Year	Notes
	Presidential Unit Citation (Army)	23 Oct – 26 Nov 65	
	Valorous Unit Award	1 May – 29 Jun 70	
	Meritorious Unit Commendation (Army)	25 Feb - 25 Jun 1944	
	Meritorious Unit Commendation (Army)	26 Jun – 25 Dec 44	
	Meritorious Unit Commendation (Army)	1 Jun 67 – 31 May 68	
	Meritorious Unit Commendation (Army)	1 Jun 68 – 30 Nov 69	
	Meritorious Unit Commendation (Army)	1 Jan 70–31 Jan 71	
	Philippine Republic Presidential Unit Citation (Army)	7 Dec 41 – 10 May 42 or 17 Oct 44 – 4 Jul 45	
	Republic of Vietnam Cross of Gallantry, with Palm	9 Aug 65 – 19 May 69	For service in Vietnam
	Republic of Vietnam Cross of Gallantry, with Palm	May 69 – Feb 70	For service in Vietnam
	Republic of Vietnam Cross of Gallantry, with Palm	21 Feb 70 – 28 Feb 71	For service in Vietnam
	Republic of Vietnam Civil Action Unit Citation	1 Jan 69 – 1 Feb 70	For service in Vietnam
