= Catecka Base Camp =

Former U.S. Army base near Pleiku, Vietnam

Catecka Base Camp (Catecka Airfield)
- Pleiku, Central Highlands in Vietnam

Site information
- Type: Army Base
- Operator: Army of the Republic of Vietnam (ARVN); United States Army (U.S. Army)
- Condition: Abandoned

Location
- Shown within Vietnam
- Coordinates: 13.865°N 107.962°E

Site history
- Built: 1965
- In use: 1965-1966
- Battles/wars: Vietnam War

Garrison information
- Garrison: 1st Cavalry Division (Airmobile)

Airfield information
- Elevation: 2,385 feet (727 m) AMSL
Runways
Direction	Length and surface
00/00	Unknown

Catecka Base Camp (also known as Catecka, Catecka Tea Plantation or The Stadium) is a former U.S. Army base southwest of Pleiku in central Vietnam.

== History ==
The base was first established in October 1965 by the 1st Brigade, 1st Cavalry Division (Airmobile) to support the relief of the Siege of Plei Me. The base was beside QL-19 next to the Catecka Tea Plantation and approximately 12 km southwest of Pleiku. The base was originally called the Stadium but by November 1965 when it was taken over by the 3rd Brigade, 1st Cavalry (Airmobile) it was called Catecka.

== Current use ==
The base is abandoned and is turned over to farmland. The Bàu Cạn Tea Plantation remains in operation.
