= 30th Medical Brigade =

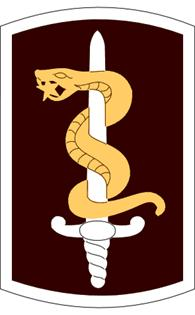
- Shoulder sleeve insignia
- Active: 1933 - Present
- Country: United States
- Branch: United States Army
- Type: Medical
- Size: Brigade
- Part of: 21st Theater Sustainment Command
- Garrison/HQ: Sembach, Germany
- Nickname: Victory Medics
- Motto: "In Cruce Mea Fides" ("My Faith is in the Cross")
- Engagements: World War II; Korean War; Desert Storm

Commanders
- Current commander: COL Nathanael C. Forrester, MS
- Notable commanders: MG Spurgeon Neel; MG George Weightman; MG David A. Rubenstein; LTG Eric Schoomaker; LTG R. Scott Dingle

Insignia
- Distinctive unit insignia

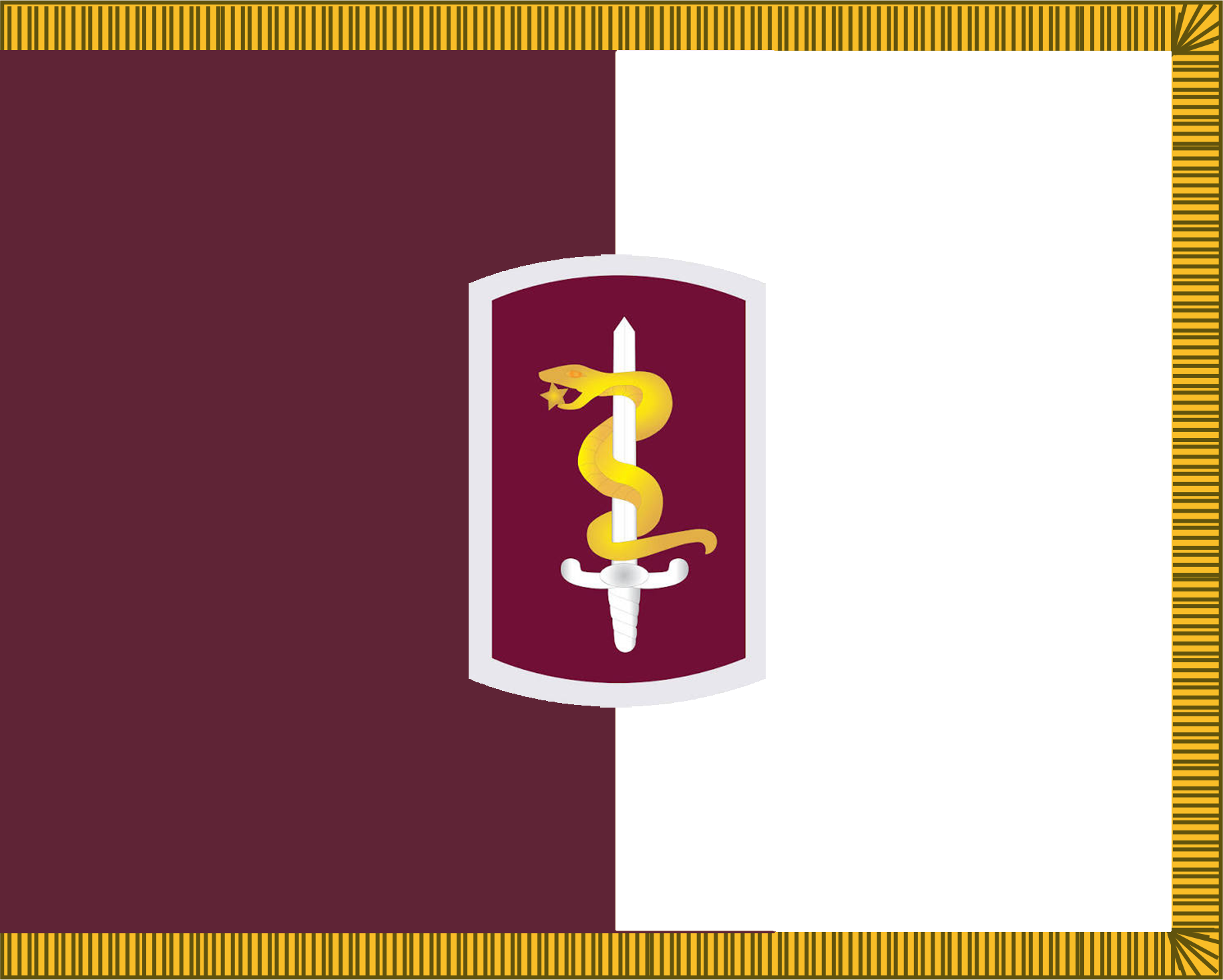
- 30th Medical Brigade Flag

The 30th Medical Brigade is a US Army medical brigade, which provides medical support to United States Army Europe and Africa. The brigade headquarters is located in Sembach, Germany, and the brigade is assigned to the 21st Theater Sustainment Command.

== Lineage and Honors ==
=== Lineage ===
- Constituted 1 October 1933 in the Regular Army as Headquarters and Headquarters Detachment, 30 Medical Regiment.
- Redesignated Headquarters, Headquarters and Service Company 30th Medical Regiment October 1939.
- Activated 25 July 1942 at Camp Barkeley, Texas.
- Reorganized and redesignated 8 September 1943 as Headquarters and Headquarters Detachment, 30th Medical Group.
- Inactivated 6 June 1949 at Fort Benning, Georgia
- Activated 25 March 1953 in Korea.
- Reorganized and redesignated 17 June 1993 as Headquarters and Headquarters Detachment, 30th Medical Brigade.
- Reorganized and redesignated 2008(?) as Headquarters and Headquarters Company, 30th Medical Command.
- Reorganized and redesignated 2013(?) as Headquarters and Headquarters Company, 30th Medical Brigade.

=== Honors ===
==== Campaign Participation Credit ====
- World War II
  - Rhineland
  - Central Europe
- Korean War
  - Third Korean Winter
  - Korea, Summer 1953
- Southwest Asia
  - Defense of Saudi Arabia
  - Liberation and Defense of Kuwait
  - Cease-Fire
- Iraq
  - Campaigns to be Determined
- Afghanistan
  - Campaigns to be Determined

==== Decorations ====
- Meritorious Unit Commendation, streamer embroidered “KOREA” (HHD 30th Medical Group, 4 June 1953 – Jan 1954)
- Army Superior Unit Award, streamer embroidered “1995-1996” (HHD 30th Medical Brigade 15 Oct 1995 – Dec 1996)
- Meritorious Unit Commendation, streamer embroidered “IRAQ” (HHC 30th Medical Command, 10 Oct 2005 - 15 Sep 2006)
- Meritorious Unit Commendation, streamer embroidered “AFGHANISTAN” (HHC 30th Medical Command, 1 May 2009 - 20 Apr 2010)
- Army Superior Unit Award, streamer embroidered “2016-2017” (HHD 30th Medical Brigade, 1 Apr 2016 - 30 Apr 2017)

== Insignia ==
=== Shoulder sleeve insignia ===
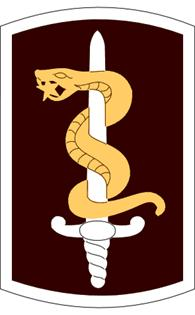
Shoulder Sleeve Insignia, 30th Medical Brigade

==== Description ====
On a maroon rectangle arced at the top and bottom with a 1/8 inch (0.32 cm) white border, 2 inches (5.1 cm) in width and 3 inches (7.6 cm) in height overall, a white sword entwined by a gold serpent grasping a gold star in its jaws.

==== Symbolism ====
Maroon and white are the colors traditionally associated with the Medical Corps. The upright sword symbolizes military preparedness and is entwined by a serpent recalling the Staff of Aesculapius and a heritage of medical service. The star represents the state of Texas, where the 30th Medical Regiment was first activated.

==== Background ====
The shoulder sleeve insignia was originally approved for the 30th Medical Brigade on 10 December 1993. It was redesignated for the 30th Medical Command on 19 August 2008. The insignia was redesignated for the 30th Medical Brigade effective 16 October 2013. (TIOH Dwg. No. A-1-810).

=== Distinctive unit insignia ===
Distinctive Unit Insignia, 30th Medical Brigade

==== Description ====
A Silver color metal and enamel device 1 1/8 inches (2.9 cm) in height overall consisting of a shield blazoned: Sanguine a sword in pale Argent, point upward entwined by a serpent Vert, holding in its mouth a mullet Or, between two daggers fesswise in cross, points to center of the second, hilts and pommels of the fourth. Attached below the shield a Silver scroll doubled and inscribed "IN CRUCE MEA FIDES" in Black letters.

==== Symbolism ====
Maroon and white are the colors traditionally associated with the Medical Corps. The sword and daggers characterize the unit as a military organization, while their position in the form of a cross entwined by a serpent, indicates it is a medical unit. The star in the mouth of the serpent is representative of the state of activation, Texas. The motto, "In Cruce Mea Fides" (In The Cross Is My Faith), is expressive of the confidence placed in the medical functioning of the original organization.

==== Background ====
The distinctive unit insignia was originally approved for the 30th Medical Regiment on 10 February 1943. It was amended to correct the description on 26 June 1943. On 3 February 1959, the insignia was rescinded. It was reinstated and redesignated for the 30th Medical Group on 16 June 1966. The insignia was redesignated for the 30th Medical Brigade with description and symbolism revised on 10 December 1993. It was redesignated for the 30th Medical Command on 19 August 2008. The insignia was redesignated for the 30th Medical Brigade effective 16 October 2013.

== History ==
=== World War II ===
The 30th Medical Regiment was constituted in the Regular Army on 1 October 1933, allotted to the Ninth Corps Area, and assigned to the Fourth Army. It was activated in June 1934 in Texas, and was organized by December 1934 with Organized Reserve personnel as a "Regular Army Inactive" (RAI) unit with headquarters at Butte, Montana. It was withdrawn from the Ninth Corps Area 5 June 1936 and allotted to the Seventh Corps Area, at the same time being returned to an inactive status. Its designated mobilization training station was Fort Francis E. Warren, Wyoming, 1933-36.

The regiment was mobilized on 25 June 1942 at Camp Barkeley, Texas as the 30th Medical Regiment (Armored), and was broken up during the middle of the 1943 Louisiana Maneuvers at Rosepine, Louisiana on 8 September 1943 with the regimental headquarters redesignated as the Headquarters and Headquarters Detachment, 30th Medical Group, its subordinate organic battalion headquarters reorganized as separate numbered battalion headquarters, and its organic companies reorganized into separate numbered clearing and collecting companies.

In 1944, the group was transferred to Liverpool, England in November 1944 and onward to Omaha Beach. After arriving on the continent, the group provided area medical support to the staging area at Valognes, France until it was assigned to the Ninth United States Army on 4 December 1944. There, it served alongside the 1st, 31st, and 64th Medical Groups in providing Echelon III support to the soldiers of the Ninth Army. There, the groups supported the Ninth Army in its drive through the Rhine and Ruhr valleys, through the Battle of the Bulge, and the advance to the Elbe river.

After the end of hostilities, the group found itself supervising the hospitalization of repartiated former allied Prisoners of War, displaced civilians, and former allied military personnel. The group's area of operation covered some 350 square miles in the area of Wittenberg, Salzwedel, Hannover, Braunschweig, and Magdeburg. Once they completed this mission, the group headquarters staged at Kappel, Germany to prepare for redeployment to the United States to refit and reequip for the fight against Japan. The group left Germany on 27 June 1945 for Camp Philadelphia, near Reims, France for preparation for overseas movement. The group left Camp Philadelphia on 8 August 1945 for the Calais Staging Area near Marseille and was in the staging are when World War II ended. The group departed France aboard the UAST Borinquen, arriving at the New York Port of Embarkation on 30 August 1945, when it proceeded to Camp Kilmer, New Jersey.

After returning to the United States, the group was assigned to the general reserve (those active-duty forces retained in the Continental United States for commitment worldwide). The group served in a training status at Camp Swift, Texas, Camp Polk, Louisiana, and Fort Benning, Georgia before finally being inactivated at Fort Benning on 6 June 1949.

=== Korean War ===
In the spring of 1953, Brigadier General L. Holmes Ginn, an Army Medical Department general officer who served as the Eighth Army Surgeon, requested the addition of a medical group headquarters to provide command and control of the medical units which were then reporting directly to the Eighth Army Surgeon's Office, in accordance with then-current doctrine. This, he felt, would enhance the management and integration of medical support operations at the army level and improve the quality of medical care.

The Department of the Army granted authority to reactivate the 30th Medical Group to serve as this command and control headquarters, and the group was reactivated on 25 March 1953 but remained at zero strength until it received its first personnel on 25 May 1963. The original cadre for the group came from the Surgeon's Office of the Eighth Army Headquarters, and the first commander of the reactivated group was Lieutenant Colonel Douglas Lindsay, MC, who had been serving as the medical operations officer on the Surgeon's staff.

The group headquarters became operational on 4 June 1953, assuming operational control over all separate Eighth Army medical units except for two evacuation hospitals, a medical intelligence detachment, and a military history detachment, all of which remained under the direct control of the Eighth Army Surgeon.

=== Cold War ===
30th Medical Group staff on Operation Wintershield, 1964

== Former Commanders ==
Image	Rank	Name	Branch	Begin date	End date	Notes
		Data Missing		1 June 1934	5 June 1936	
		Inactive		5 June 1936	24 June 1942	
		Data Missing		25 June 1942		
	Lieutenant Colonel	Wendell Walker	MC			In command when group was at Camp Swift; moved group to Fort Moore
	Lieutenant Colonel	Spurgeon H. Neel, Jr.	MC	6 September 1947	6 June 1949	Assumed command of the group at Fort Benning; inactivated the group. Commanded the 44th Medical Brigade in Vietnam; first commander of United States Army Health Services Command; retired as a Major General
		Inactive		7 June 1949	24 March 1953	
		Vacant		25 March 1953	24 May 1953	Unit at zero strength
	Lieutenant Colonel	Douglas Lindsay	MC	25 May 1953	12 September 1953	Lindsay had been the medical operations officer in the Eighth Army Surgeon's Office
	Lieutenant Colonel	Spurgeon H. Neel, Jr.	MC	13 September 1953	November 1954	Second time commanding the group.
		Data Missing		December 1954	February 1958	
	Colonel	John J. Pelosi				In command in March 1958.
	Lieutenant Colonel	Tillman D. Johnson	MC		July 1959	
	Colonel	William Horace Byrne	MC	July 1959	August 1962	Retired 30 August 1962.
	Lieutenant Colonel	Richard B. Austin, III	MC	August 1962		
	Colonel	Raoul C. Psaki	MC		July 1965	Assumed command of the U.S. Army Hospital, Neubrucke
	Lieutenant Colonel	Harold W. Meuller			July 1967	Assumed command of the U.S. Army Hospital, Bremerhaven
	Colonel	Roger A. Juel	MC	July 1967	June 1968	Assumed command of the 7th Medical Brigade
	Lieutenant Colonel	Valentine B. Sky	MC	June 1968		Had been Group Surgeon, 10th Special Forces Group (Airborne).
	Colonel	Harry J. Misch	MC		July 1971	Assumed command of the 7th Medical Brigade
		Data Missing		July 1971	August 1973	
	Colonel	William J. Plewes	MS	August 1973	1974	
	Lieutenant Colonel	Robert F. Heinz, Jr.	MS	1974	1975	
	Colonel	Gilbert Beltran	MS	1975	1976	May have left command later than indicated
		Data Missing		1976	1981	
	Colonel	Raymond Salmon	MS	1981	1983	
	Colonel	John MacIntyre	MS	1983	1985	
		Data Missing		1985	1987	
	Colonel	George E. Hammond, Jr.	MS	1987	1989	
	Colonel	Jesse Fulfer	MS	1989	1991	Dates approximate. Deployed the group to Southwest Asia in support of VII (US) Corps
		Reduced to Zero Strength		1991	15 October 1994	
	Brigadier General	Robert Edward Brady	DC	16 October 1994	July 1995	Had been deputy commander of 7th Medical Command until its inactivation. Retired out of command of the 30th Medical Brigade
	Colonel	Thomas Clements		July 1995	July 1997	
	Colonel	George W. Weightman	MC	July 1997	9 July 1999	Later commanded 44th Medical Command, AMEDD Center & School, Walter Reed Army Medical Center, and U.S. Army Medical Research and Materiel Command Retired as a Major General
	Colonel	C. William Fox, Jr.	MC	9 July 1999	April 2001	Later commanded 44th Medical Command and Brooke Army Medical Center. Retired as a Brigadier General
	Colonel	Eric D. Schoomaker	MC	April 2001	June 2002	42nd Surgeon General of the Army
	Colonel	Donald Gagliano	MC	June 2002	June 2004	
	Colonel	David A. Rubenstein	MS	June 2004	July 2005	Later served as Deputy Chief of Staff for Sustainment, United States Army Medical Command; Commander, European Regional Medical Command; Deputy Surgeon General of the Army, and Commander, Army States Army Medical Department Center and School; Retired as a Major General
	Colonel	Steven W. Swann	MC	July 2005	August 2007	Deployed the Brigade to Iraq
	Colonel	Bernard DeKoning	MC	August 2007	April 2009	
	Colonel	Dennis D. Doyle	MS	April 2009	May 2011	Later served as Commander, William Beaumont Army Medical Center; Commander, Pacific Regional Medical Command; Deputy Chief of Staff, Operations (G-3/5/7), United States Army Medical Command. Retired as a Brigadier General
	Colonel	John M. Cho	MC	May 2011	19 April 2012	Later served as Deputy Commanding General (Support), United States Army Medical Command; Commander, Western Regional Medical Command; Deputy Chief of Staff for Support, United States Army Medical Command. Retired as a Brigadier General
	Colonel	Koji D. Nishimura	MC	19 April 2014	21 May 2014	Deployed the Brigade to Afghanistan
	Colonel	R. Scott Dingle	MS	21 May 2014	30 June 2015	45th Surgeon General of the Army
	Colonel	William M. Stubbs	MS	30 June 2015	9 June 2017	
	Colonel	Timothy G. Bosetti	MS	9 June 2017		
	Colonel	Jason Weiman	MS			
	Colonel	Jordon Henderson	MC	6 July 2021	30 June 2023	

== Organization ==
=== Organization ~1946 ===
Incomplete

- HHD, 30th Medical Group
- 121st Evacuation Hospital
- 651st Medical Company (Ambulance)
- Medical Company (Collecting)

=== Organization 1953 ===
As of 1 October 1953

- HHD, 30th Medical Group
- 43d Surgical Hospital (Mobile) (Army)
- 44th Surgical Hospital (Mobile) (Army)
  - 227th Medical Detachment (Neurosurgical)
- 45th Surgical Hospital (Mobile) (Army)
- 46th Surgical Hospital (Mobile) (Army)
  - 160th Medical Detachment (Neurosurgical)
- 47th Surgical Hospital (Mobile) (Army)
- 48th Surgical Hospital (Mobile) (Army)
- 64th Field Hospital
- 1st Mobile Field Laboratory
- 560th Medical Company (Ambulance)
- 6th Medical Depot
  - 554th Medical Detachment (Optical Fabrication)
  - 555th Medical Detachment (Optical Fabrication)
- 207th Medical Detachment (Preventive Medicine Services)
- 1st Helicopter Ambulance Company (Provisional)
  - 37th Medical Detachment (Helicopter Ambulance)
  - 49th Medical Detachment (Helicopter Ambulance)
  - 50th Medical Detachment (Helicopter Ambulance)
  - 52d Medical Detachment (Helicopter Ambulance)
  - 54th Medical Detachment (Helicopter Ambulance)
  - 56th Medical Detachment (Helicopter Ambulance)
- 52d Medical Battalion
  - 514th Medical Company (Clearing)
  - 618th Medical Company (Clearing)
  - 567th Medical Company (Ambulance)
  - 37th Medical Unit (Preventive Medicine Services) (Field)
  - 123d Medical Company (Holding)
    - 212th Medical Detachment (Neuropsychiatric)
  - 542d Medical Detachment (Ambulance)
  - 548th Medical Detachment (Ambulance)
  - 8245th Army Unit
  - 665th Medical Detachment (Dental Services)
    - 462d Medical Detachment (Dental Prosthetics)
  - 60th Medical Detachment (Medical Intelligence)
  - 138th Medical Detachment (Ambulance)
  - 106th Medical Detachment (Veterinary Service)
  - 150th Medical Detachment (Veterinary Service)
  - 157th Medical Detachment (FS)
  - 10th Medical Detachment (PMC)
  - 28th Medical Detachment (PMC)
  - 121st Medical Detachment (Dispensary)
  - 129th Medical Detachment (Dispensary)
  - 137th Medical Detachment (Dispensary)
- 34th Medical Battalion
  - 452d Medical Company (Clearing)
  - 563d Medical Company (Ambulance)
  - 120th Medical Detachment (Dispensary)
- 163d Medical Battalion
  - 629th Medical Company (Clearing)
  - 559th Medical Company (Ambulance)
  - 562d Medical Company (Ambulance)
  - 568th Medical Company (Ambulance)
  - 584th Medical Company (Ambulance)
  - 78th Medical Detachment (PMC)
  - 151st Medical Detachment (PMC)
  - 153d Medical Detachment (PMC)
  - 166th Medical Detachment (PMC)
  - 126th Medical Detachment (Dispensary)
  - 128th Medical Detachment (Dispensary)
  - 130th Medical Detachment (Dispensary)
  - 136th Medical Detachment (Dispensary)
  - 156th Medical Detachment (FS)
  - 559th Medical Detachment (Ambulance)
  - 544th Medical Detachment (Ambulance)
  - 477th Medical Detachment (VFI)
  - 666th Medical Detachment (Dental Services)
    - 461st Medical Detachment (Dental Prosthetics)

=== Organization 1992 ===
As of 19 March 1992

- HHC, 30th Medical Brigade, Heidelberg
- Berlin Medical Department Activity, Heidelberg
- 2d General Hospital, Landstuhl
- 5th General Hospital, Bad Cannstatt
- 34th General Hospital,
- 97th General Hospital, Frankfurt
- 98th General Hospital,
- 2d Field Hospital,
- 45th Field Hospital,
- 130th Station Hospital, Heidelberg
- 196th Station Hospital,
- 67th Evacuation Hospital, Wurzburg
- 10th Medical Laboratory,
- 421st Evacuation Battalion, Nelligen Barracks, Stuttgart
  - 45th Medical Company (Air Ambulance), Nelligen
  - 159th Medical Company (Air Ambulance), Darmstadt
  - 236th Medical Company (Air Ambulance), Landstuhl
- 428th Medical Supply, Optical Fabrication, and Maintenance (MEDSOM), Pirmasens
- Berlin Dental Activity, Berlin
- SHAPE Dental Activity,
- 87th Medical Detachment (Dental Services)
- 89th Medical Detachment (Dental Services)
- 90th Medical Detachment (Dental Services)
- 102d Medical Detachment (Dental Services)
- 122d Medical Detachment (Dental Services), Frankfurt
- 123d Medical Detachment (Dental Services)
- 464th Medical Detachment (Dental Services)
- 576th Medical Detachment (Dental Services)
- 769th Medical Detachment (Dental Services)

=== Organization 2026 ===
- 30th Medical Brigade, in Sembach (Germany)
  - 519th Hospital Center, in Kaiserslautern (Germany)
    - Headquarters and Headquarters Detachment
    - 512th Field Hospital (32 Bed)
    - 67th Medical Detachment Team (Forward Resuscitative and Surgical)
    - 160th Medical Detachment Team (Forward Resuscitative and Surgical)
    - 167th Medical Detachment (Hospital Augmentation, Medical 32 Bed)
  - 421st Medical Battalion (Multifunctional), in Baumholder (Germany)
    - Headquarters and Headquarters Detachment
    - 8th Medical Company (Logistics)
    - 64th Medical Detachment (Veterinary Services)
    - 71st Medical Detachment (Preventive Medicine)
    - 254th Medical Detachment (Combat and Operational Stress Control)
    - 557th Medical Company (Area Support)
