= 1st Brigade Combat Team, 1st Cavalry Division =

One of three basic maneuver units of the 1st Cavalry Division, US Army

1st Brigade
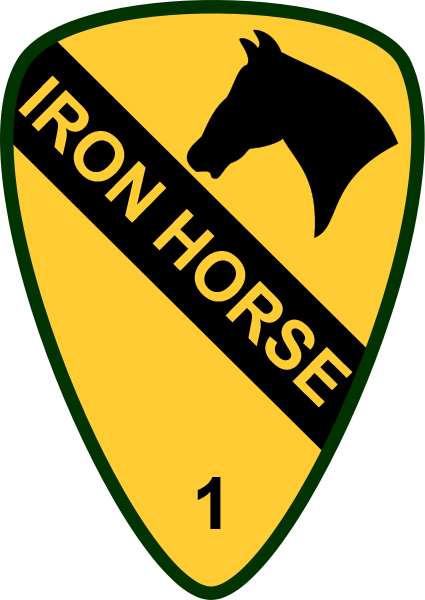
- Active: 1917 – present
- Country: United States
- Branch: United States Army
- Nickname: "IRONHORSE"
- Motto: IRONHORSE Never Quits
- Engagements: Mexican Revolution; Border War; Mexican Expedition; World War II; Pacific War; New Guinea Campaign; Philippines Campaign; Battle of Leyte; Vietnam War; Operation Hump; Tet Offensive; Cambodian Campaign; Gulf War; Operation Desert Storm; Bosnian Intervention; Operation Joint Forge; War on terrorism; Iraq War; Operation Iraqi Freedom
- Website: Official Homepage

The 1st Armored Brigade Combat Team, 1st Cavalry Division (the "First Iron Horse Brigade, First Cavalry Division") is a cavalry unit of the United States Army based in Fort Hood, Texas.

== History ==
It was constituted 29 August 1917 in the United States Army as Headquarters, 1st Cavalry Brigade. The brigade was organized as part of the 15th Cavalry Division in February 1917 at Fort Sam Houston, Texas. Brigadier General James A. Ryan was assigned as its first commander.

The brigade's initial wartime service was patrolling the United States–Mexico border, until demobilization on 14 July 1919, at Brownsville, Texas. Operating from horseback, the cavalry was charged with halting the band of smugglers that operated along the desolate Mexican border, performing duties that are today performed by the United States Border Patrol.

The brigade was later reconstituted 20 August 1920 in the Regular Army as Headquarters and Headquarters Troop, 1st Cavalry Brigade, an element of the 1st Cavalry Division. On 1 September 1921, the unit organized at Camp Harry J. Jones, in Douglas, Arizona.

The brigade fought as infantry in the Pacific Theater of World War II, as did the entire 1st Cavalry Division. It fought on New Guinea, the Bismarck Archipelago, and the Philippines, earning both the United States and the Philippines Presidential Unit Citation. The brigade deactivated 2 March 1949 in Japan and was relieved from assignment from the 1st Cavalry Division.

The 1st Brigade Headquarters was converted and redesignated as Headquarters, 1st Constabulary Brigade, on 20 May 1949, and served in Germany. The brigade was relieved from assignment to the United States Constabulary on 24 November 1950. On 15 August 1951, they deactivated in Germany and disbanded on 5 December 1951.

The brigade was again reconstituted in the Regular Army, converted, and redesignated on 15 July 1963, as Headquarters and Headquarters Company, 1st Brigade, 1st Cavalry Division. The unit was activated on 1 September 1963 in South Korea.

The 1st Brigade was transferred to Fort Benning, Georgia, in July 1963 and deployed to South Vietnam with the 1st Cavalry Division in 1965; and existed as an Airborne Brigade from July 1965 to July 1966. It established Catecka Base Camp in October 1965. Major operations included the Pleiku Campaign, operations in War zone C (III Corps), the Cambodian Campaign and operations throughout War Zone D. The brigade returned to Fort Hood in July 1971. In June 1972, the brigade received the official designation of "IRONHORSE".

The brigade deployed to Operation Desert Shield/Storm in October 1990 and conducted military operations with allied forces throughout the 6-month Gulf War. The 1st Brigade redeployed to Fort Hood, Texas, in April 1991.

Since then, elements of the brigade have deployed to Guantanamo Bay from May–June 1992 for Operation Island Sentinel, to the Emirate of Kuwait, and the National Training Center at Fort Irwin, California, for annual training.

In April 1998, the brigade was alerted for peace enforcement duty in Bosnia and Herzegovina as part of Stabilization Forces (SFOR) 4 on Operation Joint Forge. For this mission, the 8th Cavalry Regiment from the 2nd Blackjack Brigade was attached to the 1st Brigade. The 12th Cavalry Regiment was attached to the 2nd Brigade since at the time of deployment they were receiving and fielding the M1A2 tank. The brigade deployed to Bosnia from August 1998 until March 1999 and was crucial to maintaining peace and stability during a very critical and potentially violent time in Bosnia where new governments were forming and the post-war tension was at its peak.

In 2002 the 1st brigade was the first brigade in the First Cavalry Division to transition to Force XXI and received the new M1A2 SEP (System Enhancement Package) tank into its two tank battalions (1–12 Cav and 2–8 Cav) in addition to other modernized, digitally enhanced equipment. In March 2004 the 1st Bde. Deployed along with the rest of the 1st Cav in support of Operation Iraqi Freedom II. It was responsible for securing the eastern part of Baghdad, specifically Sadr City and the surrounding area. After a grueling year of combat operations, mostly against Shia Militias, the 1st Brigade redeployed to Ft Hood in March 2005. In November 2006 the 1st deployed yet again to Iraq for OIF 06–08, this time securing the area around Taji 30 miles north of Baghdad. The brigade redeployed to Ft Hood in January 2008.

About 600 soldiers from the US Army's 1st Brigade, 1st Cavalry Division deployed to Poland and the Baltic States in October 2014 under the umbrella of Operation Atlantic Resolve

In May 2018, the Ironhorse Brigade again deployed to Poland and Eastern Europe in support of Operation Atlantic Resolve. In February 2019, the brigade redeployed back to Ft. Hood relinquishing the mission to 1-1 Infantry Division.

In October 2020, the 1st Armored Brigade Combat Team, 1st Cavalry Division, deployed to Europe in October of 2020 for a nine-month rotation in support of Operation Atlantic Resolve, replacing the 2nd ABCT, 3rd Infantry Division. In August of 2021 the Brigade completed its redeployment to Ft. Hood, relinquishing the mission to the 1st Armored Brigade Combat Team, 1st Infantry Division.

== Lineage ==
- Constituted 29 August 1917 in the Regular Army as Headquarters, 1st Cavalry Brigade
- Organized in February 1918 at Fort Sam Houston, Texas, as an element of the 15th Cavalry Division
- Relieved 12 May 1918 from assignment to the 15th Cavalry Division
- Demobilized 14 July 1919 at Brownsville, Texas
- Reconstituted 20 August 1921 in the Regular Army as Headquarters, 1st Cavalry Brigade, and assigned to the 1st Cavalry Division (later redesignated as the 1st Cavalry Division, Special)
- Organized 1 September 1921 at Camp Harry J. Jones, Arizona
- Inactivated 25 March 1949 in Japan and relieved from assignment to the 1st Cavalry Division, Special
- Converted and redesignated 20 May 1949 as Headquarters, 1st Constabulary Brigade, and activated in Germany
- Inactivated 15 August 1951 in Germany
- Disbanded 5 December 1951
- Reconstituted 15 July 1963 in the Regular Army as Headquarters and Headquarters Company, 1st Brigade, 1st Cavalry Division
- Activated 1 September 1963 in Korea
- Headquarters, 1st Brigade, 1st Cavalry Division, reorganized and redesignated 17 October 2005 as Headquarters, 1st Brigade Combat Team, 1st Cavalry Division (Headquarters Company, 1st Brigade, 1st Cavalry Division – hereafter separate lineage)

== Campaign participation credit ==
Conflict
| World War II | New Guinea | 1943 |
| World War II | Bismarck Archipelago | 1943 |
| World War II | Leyte with Arrowhead | 1944 |
| World War II | Luzon | 1944 |
| Vietnam War | Defense | 1965 |
| Vietnam War | Counteroffensive | 1965–1966 |
| Vietnam War | Counteroffensive, Phase II | 1966–1967 |
| Vietnam War | Counteroffensive, Phase III | 1967–1968 |
| Vietnam War | Tet Counteroffensive | 1968 |
| Vietnam War | Counteroffensive, Phase IV | 1968 |
| Vietnam War | Counteroffensive, Phase V | 1968 |
| Vietnam War | Counteroffensive, Phase VI | 1968–1969 |
| Vietnam War | Tet 69/Counteroffensive | 1969 |
| Vietnam War | Summer–Fall 1969 | 1969 |
| Vietnam War | Winter–Spring 1970 | 1969–1970 |
| Vietnam War | Sanctuary Counteroffensive | 1970 |
| Vietnam War | Counteroffensive, Phase VII | 1970–1971 |
| Gulf War | Defense of Saudi Arabia | 1991 |
| Gulf War | Liberation and Defense of Kuwait | 1991 |
| Iraq | Iraqi Governance | 2004 |
| Iraq | National Resolution | 2005 |
| Iraq | Iraqi Surge | 2007 |

== Unit decorations ==
| Ribbon | Award | Year | Notes |
|---|---|---|---|
| | Presidential Unit Citation (Army) | 1965 | Pleiku Province |
| | Valorous Unit Award (Army) | 1970 | Fish Hook |
| | Meritorious Unit Commendation (Army) | 2003–2008 | Iraq |
| | Philippine Republic Presidential Unit Citation | 1944–1945 | Philippines campaign |
| | Republic of Vietnam Cross of Gallantry, with Palm | 1965–1969 | For service in Vietnam |
| | Republic of Vietnam Cross of Gallantry, with Palm | 1969–1970 | For service in Vietnam |
| | Republic of Vietnam Cross of Gallantry, with Palm | 1970–1971 | For service in Vietnam |
| | Republic of Vietnam Civil Action Unit Citation | 1969–1970 | For service in Vietnam |

== Units ==
- Headquarters and Headquarters Troop
- C Troop, 10th Cavalry Regiment (Brigade Armored Cavalry Troop) "Cowboy"
- 2nd Battalion, 5th Cavalry Regiment "Lancers"
- 2nd Battalion, 8th Cavalry Regiment "Stallions"
- 2nd Battalion, 12th Cavalry Regiment "Thunder Horse"
- 1st Battalion, 82nd Field Artillery Regiment "Dragons"
- 91st Brigade Engineer Battalion (formerly 1st Brigade Special Troops Battalion)
- 115th Brigade Support Battalion "Muleskinners"
