= Civilian Labor Group =

Civilian Labor Group or CLG are organisations of German or other European nationals employed by the US Army in Europe. They often wear American fatigues or a blue uniform with various insignia identifying them as CLG members.

== History ==
The Labor Service Units were created to support the Berlin Airlift of 1948–1949. With the creation of the Bundeswehr in 1955, the Labor Service Units were renamed Civilian Labor Groups. The units performed a variety of functions such as Signals, Construction, Bridging, and Security. One CLG was assigned to the US Army's 565th Engineer Battalion.

== See also ==
- Polish Armed Forces in the West
