= 15th Medical Battalion (German Army) =

Former medical unit of the German Army

- Sanitätsabteilung 15
- Active: 1914 - 1945
- Country: Germany; Germany; Germany
- Branch: Imperial German Army; German Army
- Role: Combat service support
- Size: Battalion
- Part of: XXII Army Corps, 15th Infantry Division
- Garrison/HQ: Frankfurt, Kassel
- Engagements: World War I, World War II

The red cross, the protective sign used by the Army Medical Service

The 15th Medical Battalion (German: Sanitätsabteilung 15) was a non-combat battalion of the German Army Medical Service during the First World War, the interwar period and the Second World War. It was based in Frankfurt and Kassel and consisted of personnel from Hesse.

== Organization ==
It consisted of the following squadrons:

- Aschaffenburg Medical Squadron
- Büdingen Medical Squadron
- Frankfurt/Main Medical Squadron
- Fulda Medical Squadron
- Hanau Medical Squadron
- Ohrdruf Medical Squadron

== History ==
The battalion was established during the German Empire as a battalion of the Royal Prussian Army and saw active service during the First World War. In 1919, its headquarters was moved to Kassel and it was merged with the 11th Medical Battalion. From the 1930s it was attached to the IX Army Corps and headquartered in Frankfurt. The battalion exclusively saw service in a medical capacity and thus held non-combatant status under the laws of war.

== Personnel ==
Most of the personnel of the 15th Medical Battalion were conscripted officers and soldiers, and included military physicians and other medics.

=== Commanding officers ===
- Colonel (later Major-General) Dr August Blum (1889–1952), 1938–26 August 1939
- Colonel (later Brigadier General) Dr Georg Ludewig (1887–1962), 11 June 1940 – 11 June 1941

== Literature ==
- Alex Buchner, The German Army Medical Corps in World War II, Schiffer Publishing (Schiffer Military History), 1999, ISBN 0764306928, originally published in German as Der Sanitätsdienst des Heeres 1939–1945, Podzun-Pallas, 1995, ISBN 3790905542
