= Quinn H. Becker =

Surgeon General of the US Army (1930–2022)

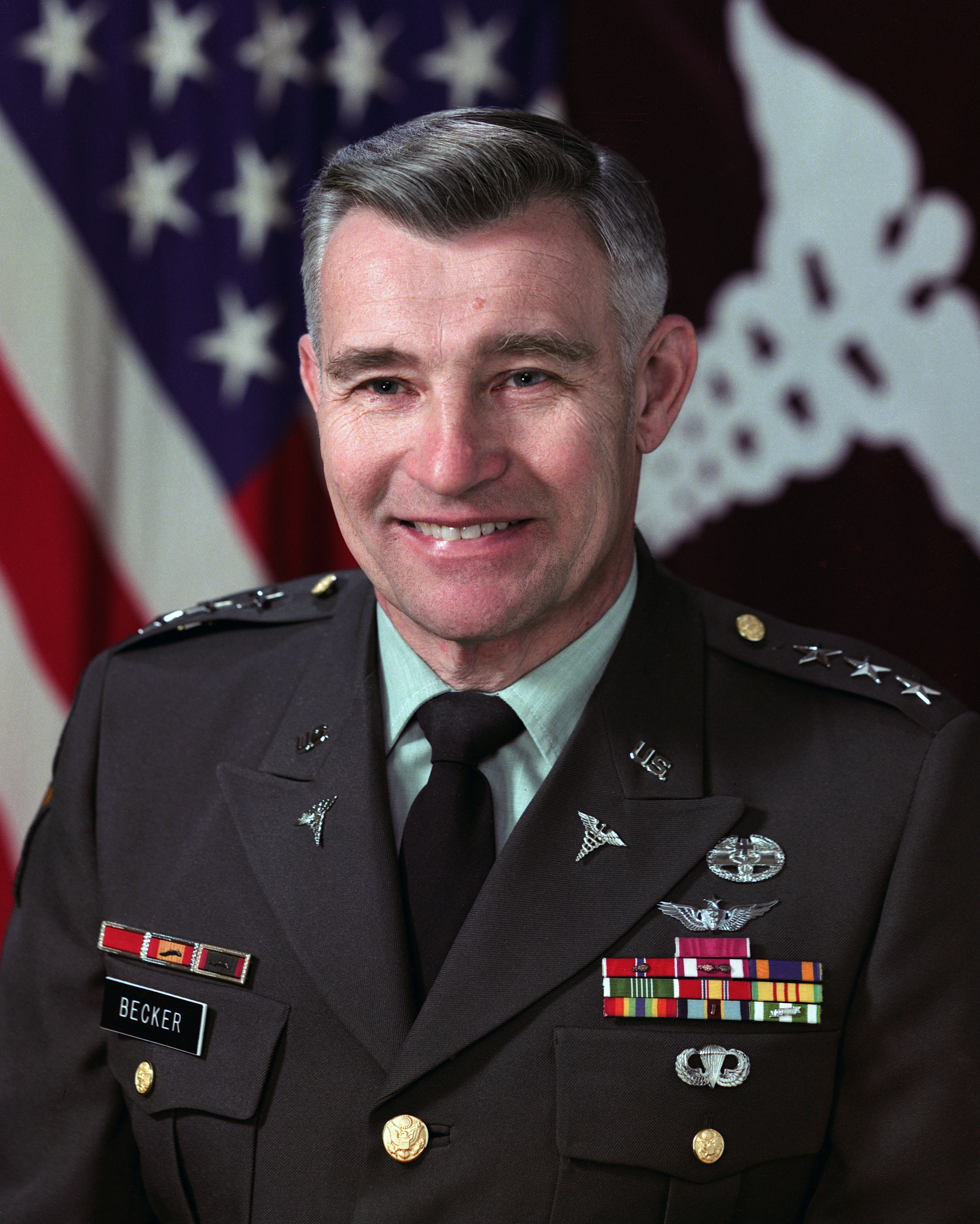
- Born: June 11, 1930; Kirksville, Missouri, U.S.
- Died: March 13, 2022 (aged 91); San Antonio, Texas, U.S.
- Military career
- Allegiance: United States of America
- Branch: United States Army
- Service years: 1956–1988
- Rank: Lieutenant general
- Commands: 15th Medical Battalion, 1st Cavalry Division (Airmobile) 7th Medical Command Surgeon General of the United States Army
- Awards: Army Distinguished Service Medal; Legion of Merit

Quinn Henderson Becker (June 11, 1930 – March 13, 2022) was a lieutenant general in the United States Army. He was Surgeon General of the United States Army from February 1985 to May 1988. Becker, who attended Louisiana State University's School of Medicine, was an orthopedic surgeon. He earned a B.S. degree from Northeast Louisiana State College in 1952 and then received his M.D. degree and Army commission in 1956. Before this stint as surgeon general, Becker was commandant of the United States Army Academy of Health Sciences, Deputy Surgeon General of the Army, and Chief Surgeon of the U.S. European Command. He was promoted to lieutenant general in March 1985. Becker died on March 13, 2022, at the age of 91.

== Awards and recognitions ==
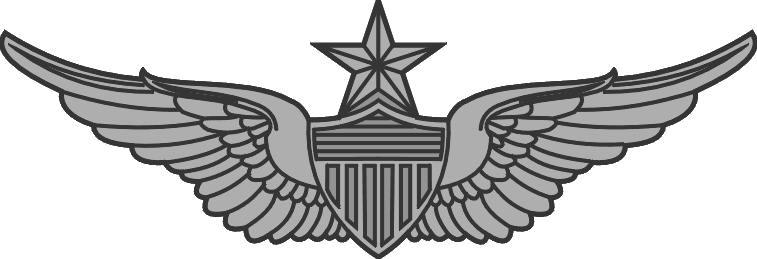
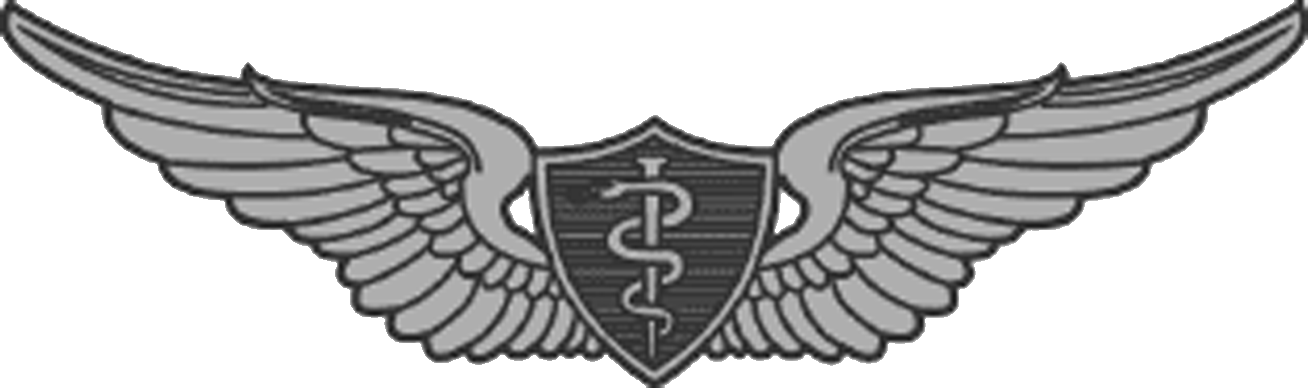
Combat Medical Badge
Senior Flight Surgeon Badge
Basic Parachutist Badge

Army Distinguished Service Medal
Legion of Merit
Bronze Star with one bronze oak leaf cluster
Meritorious Service Medal with two oak leaf clusters
Air Medal
Army Commendation Medal
Army Meritorious Unit Commendation
National Defense Service Medal
Vietnam Service Medal
Army Service Ribbon
Army Overseas Service Ribbon with bronze award numeral 1
Republic of Vietnam Gallantry Cross Unit Citation
Republic of Vietnam Civil Actions Medal Unit Citation
Vietnam Campaign Medal
