= Spurgeon Neel =

Spurgeon H. Neel Jr.
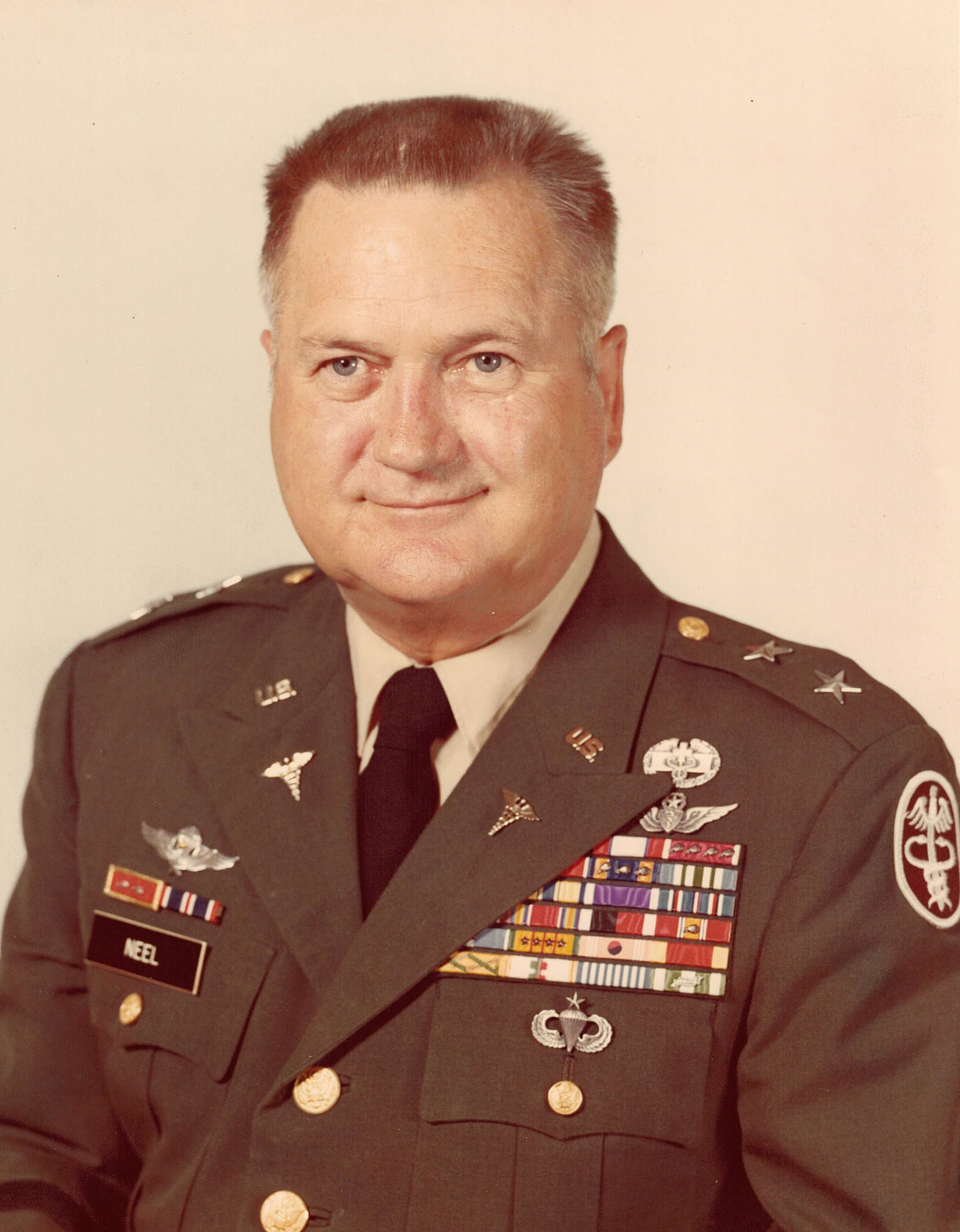
- Major General Spurgeon H. Neel Jr.
- Born: September 24, 1919; Memphis, Tennessee
- Died: June 6, 2003 (aged 83); San Antonio, Texas
- Military career
- Allegiance: United States of America
- Branch: United States Army
- Service years: 1943–1977
- Rank: Major General
- Commands: U.S. Army Health Services Command; 44th Medical Brigade; 30th Medical Group
- Conflicts: World War II; Korean War; Vietnam War
- Awards: Distinguished Service Medal; Legion of Merit w/4 oak leaf clusters; Bronze Star Medal w/one oak leaf cluster; Purple Heart

Major General Spurgeon Neel, MD, (September 24, 1919 – June 6, 2003) was a United States Army physician who pioneered the development of aeromedical evacuation of battlefield casualties.

== Biography ==
=== Early life ===
Spurgeon Hart Neel Jr, was born on September 24, 1919, in Memphis, Tennessee. His parents were Spurgeon Hart Neel and Leola Pearl Neel.

Spurgeon Neel graduated from the Memphis State University in 1939, majoring in pre-med. He earned his Doctorate of Medicine in 1942 from the University of Tennessee. Dr. Neel was a member of Phi Chi medical fraternity's Alpha Beta chapter.

Neel completed an internship at the Methodist Hospital in Memphis in 1943. He then entered military service, completing his residency in radiology at Santa Ana Army Air Base in California in 1944.

Neel married his wife, Alice T. Neel, in 1940. They had a son, Spurgeon H. Neel III, and daughter, Dr. Leah Neel Zartarian.

=== World War II ===
Neel commanded a medical company in Europe during World War II.

=== Aeromedical evacuation ===
From 1949 to 1951, Neel served as Division Surgeon of the 82nd Airborne Division at Fort Bragg, North Carolina.

In 1949, Neel chaired a board that tested, evaluated, and recommended the use of the helicopter in medical evacuation roles. The concept of utilizing rotary wing aircraft for the evacuation of seriously wounded casualties was not a new one. In 1936, at the Medical Field Service School at Carlisle Barracks, Pennsylvania, an autogyro was field-tested as an evacuation vehicle. The idea was discarded at that time for engineering and budgetary reasons more than any defect in the basic concept. During World War II the Air Force and Navy began to use helicopters for the rescue of pilots and other personnel lost at sea or in inaccessible terrain.

However, helicopters were still a novelty in 1949 when Neel began examining the idea of flying wounded soldiers out of war zones. Neel's widow, Alice Neel, told the San Antonio Express-News that Neel had said, "My job is to take care of those boys. And I'm going to do it, and I want to be able to get them to the hospital as quickly as possible, and I want the helicopter to be dedicated for that purpose and to be available for that mission.'"

As part of his 1949 study, Neel tested an early Kaman helicopter with forward clamshell doors.

Neel also explored other medical aspects of army aviation. In 1951, he published the paper "Medical Aspects of Military Parachuting," which was recognized by the Association of Military Surgeons of the United States as the best military medical essay of the year.

In March 1951, Neel became the first Army graduate of the United States Air Force School of Aerospace Medicine at Randolph Air Force Base in San Antonio, Texas.

=== Korean War ===
It was in the Korean War that helicopter evacuation became a reality. The helicopter had finally been accepted as an organic vehicle of the Army, and rugged terrain of Korea made surface transport arduous. In addition, the scarcity of hard-surface roads and harsh climate often made it extremely difficult to transport casualties from forward units.

Helicopter evacuation in Korea was not the result of any preconceived plan; it was the result of expediency. In the early days of the war, a U.S. Air Force helicopter detachment of the Third Air Rescue Squadron began to receive requests from ground elements for the evacuation of casualties from difficult terrain. Since this detachment was not fully occupied with its primary mission of rescuing downed pilots, it responded to these calls. By August 1950, this Air Force unit was answering so many calls that it found itself in the medical evacuation business.

Quick to note the advantages of helicopter evacuation in terrain such as Korea, the Eighth Army developed an increased interest in the program. During a significant test conducted by Army and Air Force representatives on August 3, 1950, in the school yard of the Taegu Teachers College, Army helicopters were adopted for the evacuation of casualties and the first procedures were established. On 22 November 1950 the Army's Second Helicopter Detachment arrived in Korea, equipped with four H-13 aircraft.

Army helicopter evacuation was officially established on 1 January 1951 when the Second Helicopter Detachment became operational and was attached to the 8055th Mobile Army Surgical Hospital. In January 1951, two more helicopter detachments, the Third and Fourth, arrived in Korea with minimum operating personnel and four H-13 aircraft, followed in February by the First Helicopter Detachment. At this time all helicopter detachments used in medical evacuation were assigned to the 8085th Army Unit, Eighth Army Flight Detachment, and attached to forward surgical hospitals.

Before the armistice ended the war in 1953, army helicopters would fly 18,000 U.N. casualties to hospitals, helping save seven of every 10 victims.

Neel spent most of the war in the U.S., first in Washington, D.C., and then in San Antonio, Texas. From 1952 to 1953, Neel served as Chief of the Field Medical Service Branch of the Medical Field Service School at Fort Sam Houston near San Antonio. He led the establishment of helicopter ambulance units and supervised the activation, training, and deployment of five helicopter ambulance detachments at Brooke Army Medical Center.

Neel transferred to Korea in 1953 before the armistice ended active hostilities on July 27. Neel served as commander of the 30th Medical Group in Korea from 1953 to 1954. He established the Eighth Army aviation medical program in 1954, which became the prototype for the Army-wide aviation medical program.

The aeromedical evacuation doctrine espoused by Neel called for medical control of evacuation and the need for pilots and aircraft dedicated to that mission alone. Field maneuvers after Korea included use of aeromedical evacuation.

=== Post war ===
From 1954-1957, Neel served at the U.S. Army Office of the Surgeon General in Washington, D.C.

After the Korean War the Surgeon General's Office applied itself to assessing the potential of helicopter ambulances in future conflicts. In particular, Lt. Col. Neel, in a number of medical and aviation journals, publicized and promoted the Army's air ambulances. The Korean experience, he realized, could not serve as an infallible guide to the use of helicopters in other types of wars and different geographical regions, but it certainly showed that helicopters had made possible at least a modification of the first links in Letterman's chain of evacuation. A superior communications system would allow a well-equipped and well-staffed ambulance to land at or near the site of the wounding, making much ground evacuation unnecessary. If the patient's condition could be stabilized briefly, it might prove helpful to use the speed of the helicopter to evacuate the patient farther to the rear, to more complete medical facilities than those provided at a rudimentary division clearing station. Triage might be carried out better at a hospital than in the field.

Based on experience during the Korean War, Neel developed medical evacuation policies, procedures, and organizations which are the foundation of current aeromedical operations.

In 1954, Neel became the Army's first Aviation Medical Officer. In 1955 he served on the Department of the Army board which conducted a design competition to select the new standard Army utility helicopter, which ultimately became the UH-1. The same year he established flying status for Aviation Medical Officers and was the first Aviation Medical Officer to receive flying status.

In 1956, Neel established the Aviation Branch within the Office of the Surgeon General and became its first chief, later designing the Aviation Medical Officer Badge and becoming its first recipient. Neel also established a formal program for Board Certification of Army Medical Officers in Aviation Medicine and laid the groundwork for the Army Aviation Medical Training and Research Program.

Neel designed the Aviation Medical Officer badge in 1957. Neel was the first to be awarded the badge.

From 1957 to 1958, Neel was a student at the Harvard School of Public Health in Boston, where he received the degree Master of Public Health.

United States Air Force School of Aerospace Medicine at Brooks Air Force Base from 1959 to 1960.

Neel assumed command of the U.S. Army Hospital at Fort Rucker, Alabama, in 1961. He established the Army Aeromedical Research Laboratory at Ft. Rucker. He also initiated construction of the Lyster Army Hospital, a modern facility with specialized aviation medicine capability.

Neel was awarded a Master's of Science in Business Administration from George Washington University in 1965.

=== Vietnam ===
During the Vietnam War, Neel served as surgeon with the Military Assistance Command, Vietnam from 1965 to 1966. Neel served as Senior Medical Advisor to General William Westmoreland.

Neel coordinated introduction of medical air ambulance units during the build-up. He also established the Saigon office of the Far East Joint Medical Regulating Office to manage patient movements within and from the Republic of Vietnam during the war. He coordinated U.S. Army aeromedical evacuation in support of U.S. and South Vietnam forces and Vietnamese civilians.

In Vietnam, the Army formed "dustoff" units, named for a radio call sign, which evacuated about 380,000 patients.

In recognition of his role in the development and execution of combat zone medical operations, Neel was awarded the Major Gary P. Wratten Award of the Association of Military Surgeons of the United States in 1967.

Neel returned to the U.S. in 1966 and was assigned to the U.S. Army's Office of the Surgeon General in Washington, D.C., as Director of Plans, Supply, and Operations.

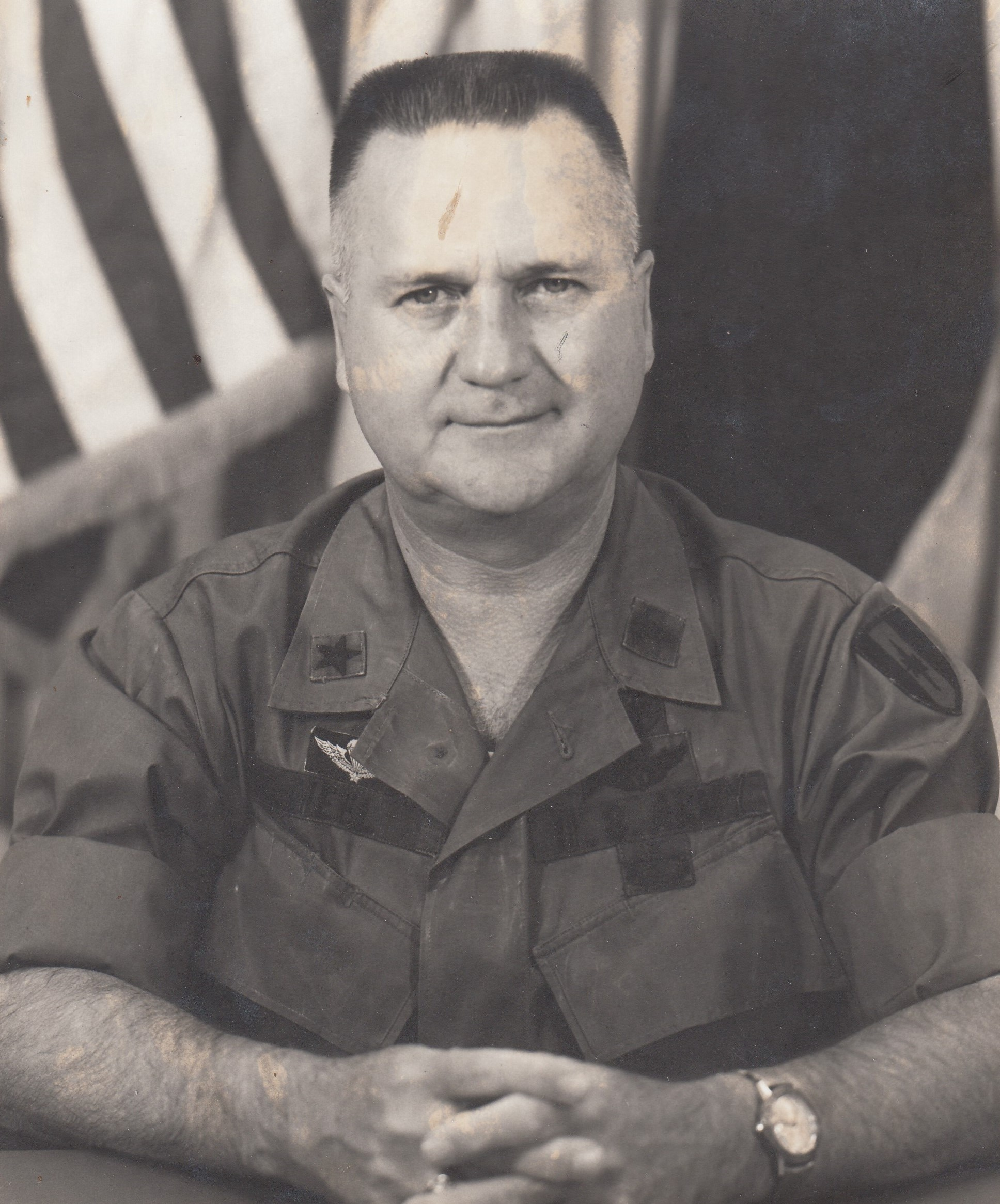
Command Photograph of Brigadier General Spurgeon Neel, 44th Medical Brigade, 1968-1969

Neel served a second tour in Vietnam from 1968 to 1969. He served as Commanding General of the 44th Medical Brigade and as Surgeon of the United States Army, Vietnam

Neel's innovations in battlefield medicine greatly improved the survival rates for wounded soldiers. In World War I, 8 percent of all injured men died of their injuries; in World War II, 4.5 percent; in Korea, 2.5 percent; and in Vietnam, 1.5 percent. Neel attributed the lowering mortality rate to (1) the helicopter, (2) whole blood, (3) hospitals, and (4) highly trained personnel. As Neel pointed out, it was the medic under fire in whose hands rested the life-or-death decision for the wounded man.

The length of hospitalization for Vietnam victims was half of what it was for injured men in Korea-—48 days for Vietnam compared to 91 days for Korea. Neel attributed this improvement to the swiftness of helicopter evacuation and the advances in medical technology.

=== Return to U.S. ===
Neel served as Deputy Surgeon General of the U.S. Army in Washington, D.C., from 1969 to 1973.

Neel wrote a book entitled Medical Support of the U.S. Army in Vietnam 1965-1970 that was published by the Department of the Army in 1973.

Neel moved to San Antonio in 1973 to become the first Commanding General of the U.S. Army Health Services Command. Health Services Command was activated on 1 April 1973 as part of reorganizing the Army Medical Department. It took control of almost all Army medical facilities in the continental US, including medical education. It answered directly to the Chief of Staff of the Army. This allowed the Office of the Surgeon General to focus more on staff and technical supervisory duties as the principal adviser to the Chief of Staff of the Army on health and medical matters. In 1994, the HSC and Office of the Surgeon General were merged again.

Neel advocated civilian air ambulance systems and oversaw formation of the 507th Medical Company, which provided military assistance to safety and traffic. By rescuing more than 5,000 civilians from car wrecks, floods and trauma cases in and around San Antonio, the Military Assistance to Safety and Traffic (MAST) program further promoted air ambulance service.

=== Retirement ===
Neel retired from the U.S. Army in 1977 with the rank of Major General. After his army retirement, Neel served as Professor in Occupational and Aerospace Medicine at the University of Texas Health Science Center.

Neel served as honorary colonel of the Army Medical Department Regiment from 1986 to 1994. The regiment was activated on 28 July 1986 as part of the creation of the Army Regimental System to foster and cohesion. All medical officers and enlisted personnel were formally affiliated with the regiment, to include wearing the departmental crest on their uniforms. Neel was the first honorary colonel. Primarily a ceremonial position, Neel's role was to enhance morale and esprit de corps through the perpetuation of the regiment's traditions and customs.

During retirement, Neel also served as Medical Director of USAA, the insurance association serving military personnel. He also served on the Board of Directors at Eisenhower National Bank for 10 years.

Neel helped establish the Army Medical Department (AMEDD) Museum at Fort Sam Houston. Neel served as chairman of the museum board that was responsible for the expansion of the museum.

=== Death ===
Neel died at the age of 83 on June 6, 2003, in San Antonio, Texas. He was buried at Fort Sam Houston National Cemetery, Section A1, Site 526.

== Awards ==
Neel was award the Distinguished Service Medal, the Legion of Merit with four oak leaf clusters, the Bronze Star with one oak leaf cluster, and the Purple Heart.

Neel was inducted into the Army Aviation Hall of Fame in 1976.

== Legacy ==
- In 2006, the Spurgeon Neel Evacuation Pavilion was established at the Army Medical Department Museum at Fort Sam Houston as a memorial to Neel's work. The pavilion houses an H-13 helicopter from the Korean War and the UH-1 "Huey" helicopter that Neel helped develop.
- The Neel Aeromedical Science Center at Fort Rucker, Alabama, was also dedicated in his honor. The Neel Aeromedical Science Center houses the U.S. Army Aeromedical Research Laboratory (USAARL) and was dedicated on April 2, 2004.
