= 15th Brigade Support Battalion (United States) =

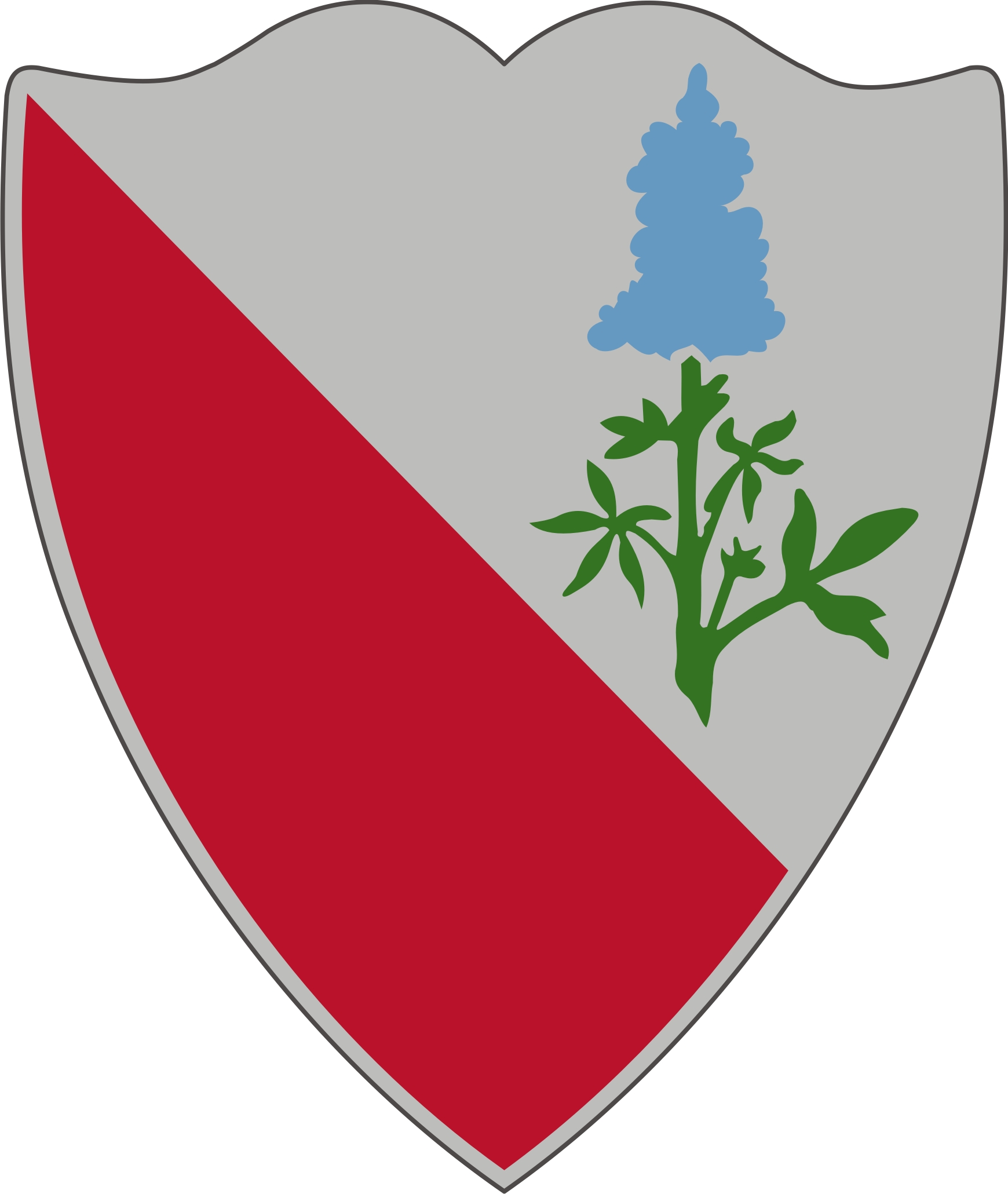
- Distinctive Unit Insignia for the 15th BSB
- Active: 23 March 1925– Present
- Country: United States
- Branch: Logistics
- Type: Command
- Size: battalion
- Garrison/HQ: Fort Cavazos, Texas

Commanders
- Notable commanders: LTG Quinn H. Becker

The 15th Medical Battalion is a battalion of the United States Army.

== Organization ==
The 15th Medical Battalion was a non-combat battalion of the United States Army Medical Department, originally formed on 23 March 1925 as the 1st Medical Squadron and redesignated as the 15th Medical Battalion on 25 March 1949.

In 1965 the 15th Medical Battalion and the 1st Cavalry Division colors in Korea were exchanged with the 11th Air Assault Division (Test) and the 2d Infantry Division at Fort Benning, Georgia. The personnel and equipment of the 2d and 11th divisions were merged to become the 1st Cavalry Division (Airmobile) and the colors of the 2d Infantry Division were sent to Korea. Within months the 1st Cavalry Division (Airmobile) was on its way to South Vietnam.

On 1 October 1984 the 15th Medical Battalion was redesignated the 2nd Forward Support Battalion. There were three companies A, B, C, in the 15th Medical Battalion. Major Zmnbrasky was the Battalion Commander. Two of the three Medical companies were reassigned and a Quartermaster company from the 15th Supply & Transportation Battalion became the new Company A, while Company B came from the 27th Maintenance Battalion. On 15 May 1987, the 15th Medical Battalion became the 15th Support Battalion (Forward). The Battalion has been assigned to the 1st Cavalry Division since it was formed on 29 December 1950.

== Service ==
The unit saw service during the Second World War, the Korean War, the Vietnam War, the Gulf War (Operations Desert Shield and Desert Storm), the Bosnian War (as part of rotation SFOR 5), the war in Iraq (Operation Iraqi Freedom), Hurricane Katrina, and the war in Afghanistan (Operation Enduring Freedom). It is currently designated the 15th Brigade Support Battalion, providing logistics support to the 2nd Brigade Combat Team, 1st Cavalry Division.
