= United States Army Health Services Command =

Former command of the U.S. Army Medical Department

The U.S. Army Health Services Command was activated on 1 April 1973 as part of a reorganization of the Army Medical Department. It took control of almost all Army medical facilities in the continental US, including medical education.

== Purpose ==
The Health Services Command answered directly to the Chief of Staff of the United States Army. This allowed the Office of the Surgeon General to focus more on staff and technical supervisory duties as the principal adviser to the Chief of Staff of the Army on health and medical matters. In 1994, the HSC and Office of The Surgeon General were merged again.

== Commanders ==
Commanders of the Health Services Command were the following:

- Major General Spurgeon Neel, April 1973 – October 1977
- Major General Marshall E. McCabe October 1977 – April 1980
- Major General Raymond H. Bishop Jr., April 1980 – July 1983
- Major General Floyd W. Baker, July 1983 – July 1986
- Major General Tracey E. Strevey Jr., July 1986 – September 1988
- Major General John E. Major, September 1988 0 28 December 1990
- Major General Alcide M. Lanoue, December 1990 – August 1992
- Brigadier General John J. Cuddy, August 1992 – October 1992
- Major General Richard D. Cameron, November 1992 – October 1994
