= 326th =

326th may refer to:

- 326th Aeronautical Systems Wing (326 ASW), a wing of the US Air Force assigned to the Aeronautical Systems Center at Wright-Patterson Air Force Base, Ohio
- 326th Air Division, an inactive United States Air Force organization
- 326th Airlift Squadron (326 AS), part of the 512th Airlift Wing at Dover Air Force Base, Delaware
- 326th Bombardment Squadron, an inactive United States Air Force unit
- 326th Fighter-Interceptor Squadron, an inactive United States Air Force unit
- 326th Infantry Division (Wehrmacht), formed on November 9, 1942, to serve as an occupation force in France
- 326th Medical Battalion (United States), now the 626th Brigade Support Battalion, a unit of the 101st Airborne Division

== See also ==
- 326 (number)
- 326, the year 326 (CCCXXVI) of the Julian calendar
