= 326th Medical Battalion (United States) =

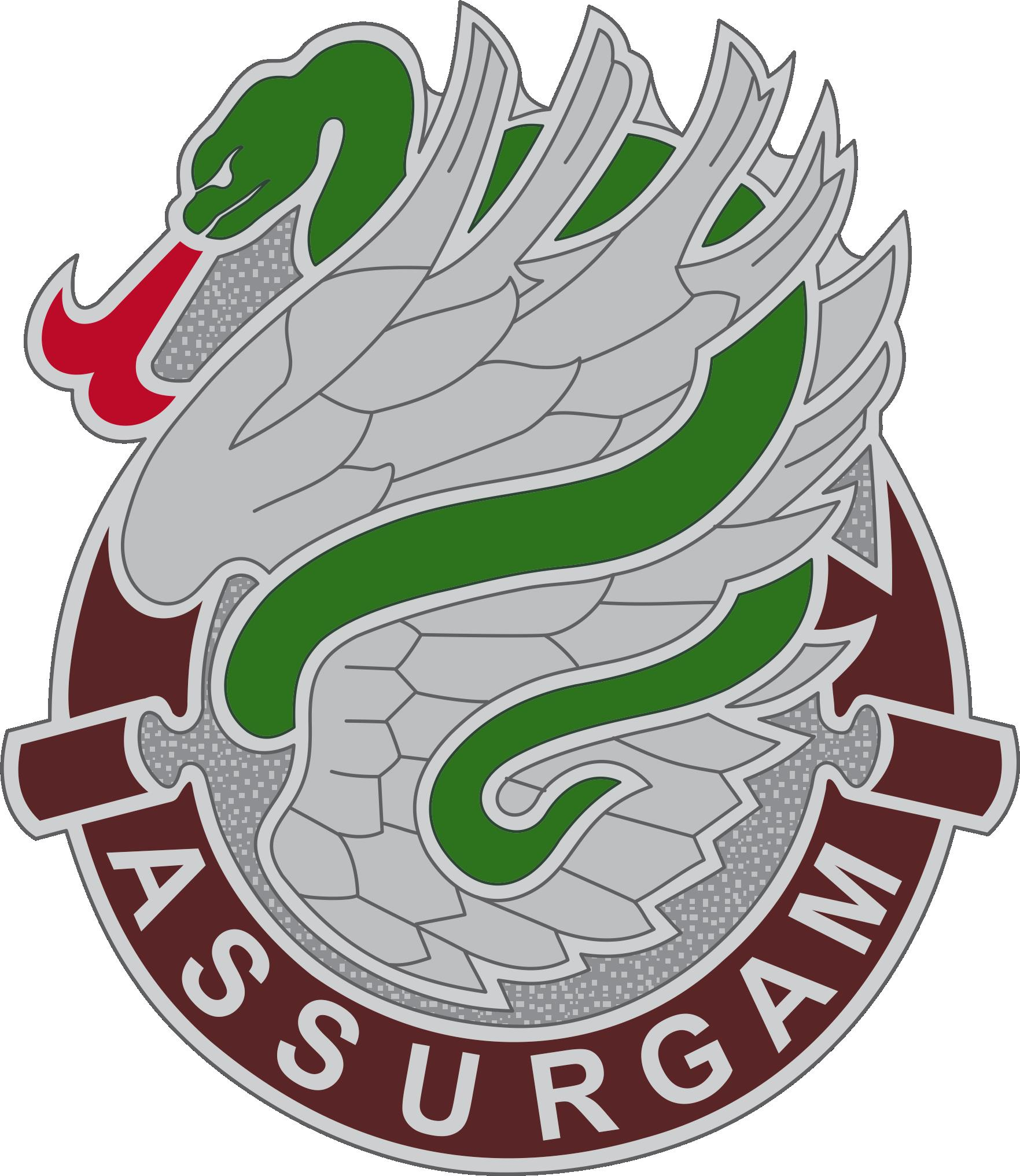
- 326th Medical Battalion Distinctive Unit Insignia
- Active: 1942 – 1946; 1948 - 1949; 1950 - 1953; 1954 – 1994
- Country: United States
- Branch: United States Army
- Type: Medical
- Size: Battalion
- Part of: 101st Airborne Division
- Garrison/HQ: Fort Campbell, Kentucky
- Engagements: World War II, Vietnam, Saudi Arabia, Iraq, Afghanistan
- Battle honours: Presidential Unit Citation (Army), Streamer embroidered NORMANDY; Presidential Unit Citation (Army), Streamer embroidered BASTOGNE; Meritorious Unit Commendation (Army), Streamer embroidered VIETNAM 1968-1969; French Croix de Guerre with Palm, World War II, Streamer embroidered NORMANDY; Netherlands Orange Lanyard; Belgian Fourragere 1940; Cited in the Order of the Day of the Belgian Army for action in FRANCE and BELGIUM; Belgian Croix de Guerre with Palm 1940, Streamer embroidered BASTOGNE; Republic of Vietnam Cross of Gallantry with Palm, Streamer embroidered VIETNAM 1968-1969; Republic of Vietnam Cross of Gallantry with Palm, Streamer embroidered VIETNAM 1971; Republic of Vietnam Civil Action Honor Medal First Class, Streamer embroidered VIETNAM 1968-1970

Commanders
- Notable commanders: LTG Bernard T. Mittemeyer MG Floyd W. Baker; MG Patrick Henry Brady; BG Jerome V. Foust BG Ran L. Phillips, Jr.

The 326th Medical Battalion was a divisional support medical unit of the United States Army. It supported the 101st Airborne Division, located at Fort Campbell, Kentucky. Its lineage and honors are perpetuated by the 626th Light Support Battalion, 101st Sustainment Brigade, 101st Airborne Division.

== Lineage ==
- Constituted 23 July 1918 in the National Army as the 326th Sanitary Train and assigned to the 101st Division
- Organized October–November 1918 at Camp Shelby, Mississippi
- Disbanded 11 December 1918
- Reconstituted 24 June 1921 in the Organized Reserves as the 326th Medical Regiment and assigned to the 101st Division (later redesignated as the 101st Airborne Division)
- Organized in November 1921 at Milwaukee, Wisconsin
- Reorganized and redesignated 30 January 1942 as the 326th Medical Battalion
- Disbanded 15 August 1942;
  - Concurrently reconstituted in the Army of the United States, and consolidated with the 326th Airborne Medical Company (constituted 6 August 1942 in the Army of the United States and assigned to the 101st Airborne Division) and consolidated unit designated as the 326th Airborne Medical Company, an element of the 101st Airborne Division and activated at Camp Claiborne, Louisiana
- Inactivated 30 November 1945 in France
- Redesignated 18 June 1948 as Headquarters and Headquarters Company, 501st Airborne Medical Battalion
  - Medical Detachment, 907th Glider Field Artillery Battalion [constituted 24 June 1921 in the Organized Reserves as Part, 307th Ammunition Train] redesignated as Clearing Company, 501st Medical Battalion
  - 595th Motor Ambulance Company [constituted 25 February 1943 in the Army of the United States as Company C, 430th Medical Ambulance Battalion] redesignated as Ambulance Company, 501st Airborne Medical Battalion
- Battalion allotted 25 June 1948 to the Regular Army
- Activated 6 July 1948 at Camp Breckinridge, Kentucky
- Inactivated 22 April 1949 at Camp Breckinridge, Kentucky
- Activated 25 August 1950 at Camp Breckinridge, Kentucky
- Inactivated 1 December 1953 at Camp Breckinridge, Kentucky
- Activated 15 May 1954 at Fort Jackson, South Carolina
- Headquarters and Headquarters Company, reorganized and redesignated 1 July 1956 as the 326th Airborne Medical Company
- Reorganized and redesignated 25 April 1957 as the 326th Medical Company
  - Clearing and Ambulance companies concurrently inactivated, relieved from assignment to the 101st Airborne Division, and redesignated as the 226th and 595th Medical Companies, respectively — hereafter separate lineages
- Reorganized and redesignated 3 February 1964 as Headquarters and Company A, 326th Medical Battalion (organic elements concurrently constituted as elements of the 101st Airborne Division and activated)
- Reorganized and redesignated as the 626th Support Battalion in 1994.

== Honors ==
=== Campaign participation credit ===
- World War II
  - Normandy (with Arrowhead)
  - Rhineland (with Arrowhead)
  - Ardennes—Alsace
  - Central Europe
- Vietnam
  - Counteroffensive, Phase III
  - Tet Counteroffensive
  - Counteroffensive, Phase IV
  - Counteroffensive, Phase V
  - Counteroffensive, Phase VI
  - Tet 69/Counteroffensive
  - Summer—Fall 1969
  - Winter-Spring 1970
  - Sanctuary Counteroffensive
  - Counteroffensive, Phase VII
  - Consolidation I
  - Consolidation II
- Southwest Asia
  - Defense of Saudi Arabia
  - Liberation and Defense of Kuwait

Company C additionally entitled to:

- Vietnam:
  - Defense
  - Counteroffensive
  - Counteroffensive, Phase II

=== Decorations ===
- Presidential Unit Citation (Army), Streamer embroidered NORMANDY
- Presidential Unit Citation (Army), Streamer embroidered BASTOGNE
- Meritorious Unit Commendation (Army), Streamer embroidered VIETNAM 1968-1969
- French Croix de Guerre with Palm, World War II, Streamer embroidered NORMANDY
- Netherlands Orange Lanyard
- Belgian Fourragere 1940
- Cited in the Order of the Day of the Belgian Army for action in FRANCE and BELGIUM
- Belgian Croix de Guerre with Palm 1940, Streamer embroidered BASTOGNE
- Republic of Vietnam Cross of Gallantry with Palm, Streamer embroidered VIETNAM 1968-1969
- Republic of Vietnam Cross of Gallantry with Palm, Streamer embroidered VIETNAM 1971
- Republic of Vietnam Civil Action Honor Medal First Class, Streamer embroidered VIETNAM 1968-1970

Company A additionally entitled to:

- Republic of Vietnam Cross of Gallantry with Palm, Streamer embroidered VIETNAM 1968
- Republic of Vietnam Cross of Gallantry with Palm, Streamer embroidered 1968 — 1969

Company B additionally entitled to:

- Meritorious Unit Commendation (Army), Streamer embroidered VIETNAM 1968

Company C additionally entitled to:

- Presidential Unit Citation (Army), Streamer embroidered DONG AP BIA MOUNTAIN

== History ==
The 326th Medical Battalion was initially constituted on 23 July 1918 as the 326th Sanitary Train and was assigned to the 101st Division. The 101st Sanitary Train, to include Ambulance Companies 401 through 404 and Field Hospital Companies 401 through 404, was never fully organized before the War Department ordered the demobilization of the 101st Division on 30 November 1918, and the unit was formally demobilized on 11 December 1918.

The 326th Medical Regiment was constituted in the Organized Reserves on 24 June 1921. It was assigned to the 101st Division and allotted to the VI Corps Area. The Regiment was initiated on 17 October 1921 with the regimental headquarters located in Milwaukee, Wisconsin. The regiment's Sanitary Battalion (later redesignated as the Collecting Battalion) was organized with its headquarters at Holcombe, Wisconsin and its Hospital Battalion was organized with its headquarters at Prairie du Chien, Wisconsin, and its Ambulance Battalion with headquarters at Elroy, Wisconsin. By 1934 the Hospital Battalion and the Collecting Battalion Headquarters relocated to Milwaukee. During most years, the Regiment conducted its annual training at Fort Snelling, Minnesota, hosted by the post's station hospital.

On 30 January 1942, the Regiment was reorganized and redesignated as the 326th Medical Battalion of the 101st Division as part of the Army's reorganization from Square to Triangular divisions. The Army, in preparation for the war in Europe, withdrew the Battalion from the organized reserves and assigned it to the Army of the United States on 15 August 1942, once more reorganizing and redesignating the unit, this time as the 326th Airborne Medical Company. Along with the rest of the division, the company was inactivated on 30 November 1945 at Auxerre, France.

In 1964, just before the division deployed elements to Vietnam, the 326th Medical Company was expanded into the 326th Medical Battalion.

As part of an Army-wide reorganization of combat forces, In 1992 the 326th Medical Battalion was reorganized and redesignated as the 626th Forward Support Battalion. Its companies were redesignated as Forward Support Medical Companies (FSMCs) and reassigned to the Brigade Combat Teams (BCT), 101st Airborne Division (Air Assault). A Company was designated as the Company C, 426 FSB, B Company was designated as Company C, 525 FSB, and C Company remained as the medical company of the 626 FSB.

== Vietnam ==
Stanton's Vietnam Order of Battle, 213, says Co D (Airborne) arrived in Vietnam with the 1st Brigade (separate) at Phan Rang in July 1965. In 1966 the authorized strength of the company was 76. The main body of the 326th Medical Battalion arrived in Vietnam on 22 July 1967 and departed on 23 December 1971. The battalion's authorized strength was 380.

== Aeromedical evacuation in Desert Shield/Desert Storm ==
Company D, an Aero Medical Evacuation (Medevac) Unit active until 2015, was often referred to by its callsign, "Eagle Dustoff". It traced its history from the 50th Medical Detachment (Helicopter Ambulance).

On 1 July 1968, the 50th Medical Detachment (Helicopter Ambulance) was attached to the 326th Medical Battalion, was inactivated on 14 August 1968, and its personnel and equipment used to form the nucleus of the Air Ambulance Platoon of the 326th Medical Battalion.

During the 1990 Gulf War (Desert Shield/Desert Storm), Eagle Dustoff (D Co, 326 Med Bn) was deployed to the Saudi Arabian Theatre of operations on Aug 22 1990 and was the first US Army Medevac unit in country. When Eagle Dustoff landed in Dhahran Saudi Arabia and unloaded the 3 UH60A Medevac birds from the C5A Galaxy, Eagle Dustoff immediately began taking missions with the evacuation of an injured US Marine with a broken leg. Two days after assuming duty, Eagle Dustoff moved 40 miles Northwest of Dhahran to King Fahd International Airport where Medevac operations remained until Jan 18, 1991 when all 12 Medevac birds were moved 700 miles NW to TAA Campbell at the start of Operation Desert Storm.

During the time at TAA Campbell birds from Eagle Dustoff ventured into Iraq to support air operations connected to the Air War against Baghdad. On February 28, 1991, the remaining personnel from Eagle Dustoff convoyed with the 326 Med Bn and the rest of the 101st Airborne 115 miles into Iraq to FOB Cobra. Operations at FOB Cobra lasted until after the cease fire with Iraq and for a week after when the unit returned to TAA Campbell. Eagle Dustoff then completely returned to King Fahd International on Mar 28, 1991.

The last member of Eagle Dustoff to arrive back at Fort Campbell did so on April 24, 1991.

When the 326th Medical Battalion was reorganized and redesignated as the 626th Forward Support Battalion, Company D was redesignated as the 50th Medical Company (Air Ambulance), with the lineage and honors of the original 50th Medical Detachment (Helicopter Ambulance).

== Distinctive unit insignia ==
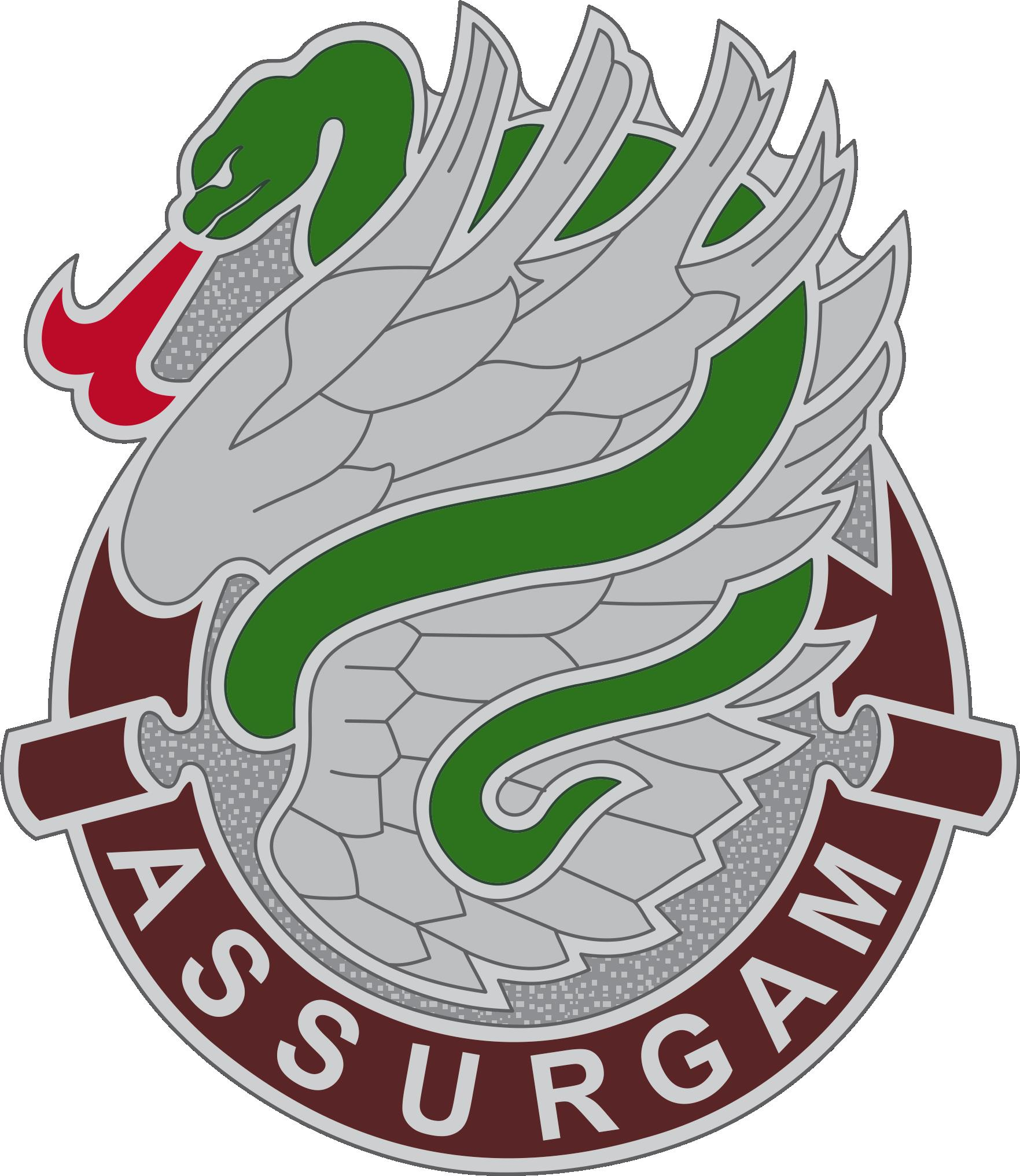
Distinctive Unit Insignia, 326th Medical Battalion

=== Description ===
A silver eagle wing entwined by a green serpent with red fangs above a maroon scroll with the motto “ASSURGAM” in silver lettering. The overall height is 1 1/8 inches (2.86 cm).

=== Symbolism ===
The eagle's wing signifies flight. The serpent represents the Medical Corps, the assignment of the original organization. The motto translates to “I Rise Up.”

=== Background ===
The distinctive unit insignia was originally approved for the 326th Airborne Medical Company on 24 November 1942. It was amended to place the insignia on a shield with motto below and authorized for the 501st Airborne Medical Battalion on 29 August 1952. It was rescinded on 29 October 1957. The original design of the insignia was reinstated with motto added, for the 326th Medical Company on 29 October 1957. It was redesignated for the 326th Medical Battalion on 5 April 1965. It was redesignated for the 626th Support Battalion with the description and symbolism revised effective 16 April 1994.

== Coat of arms ==
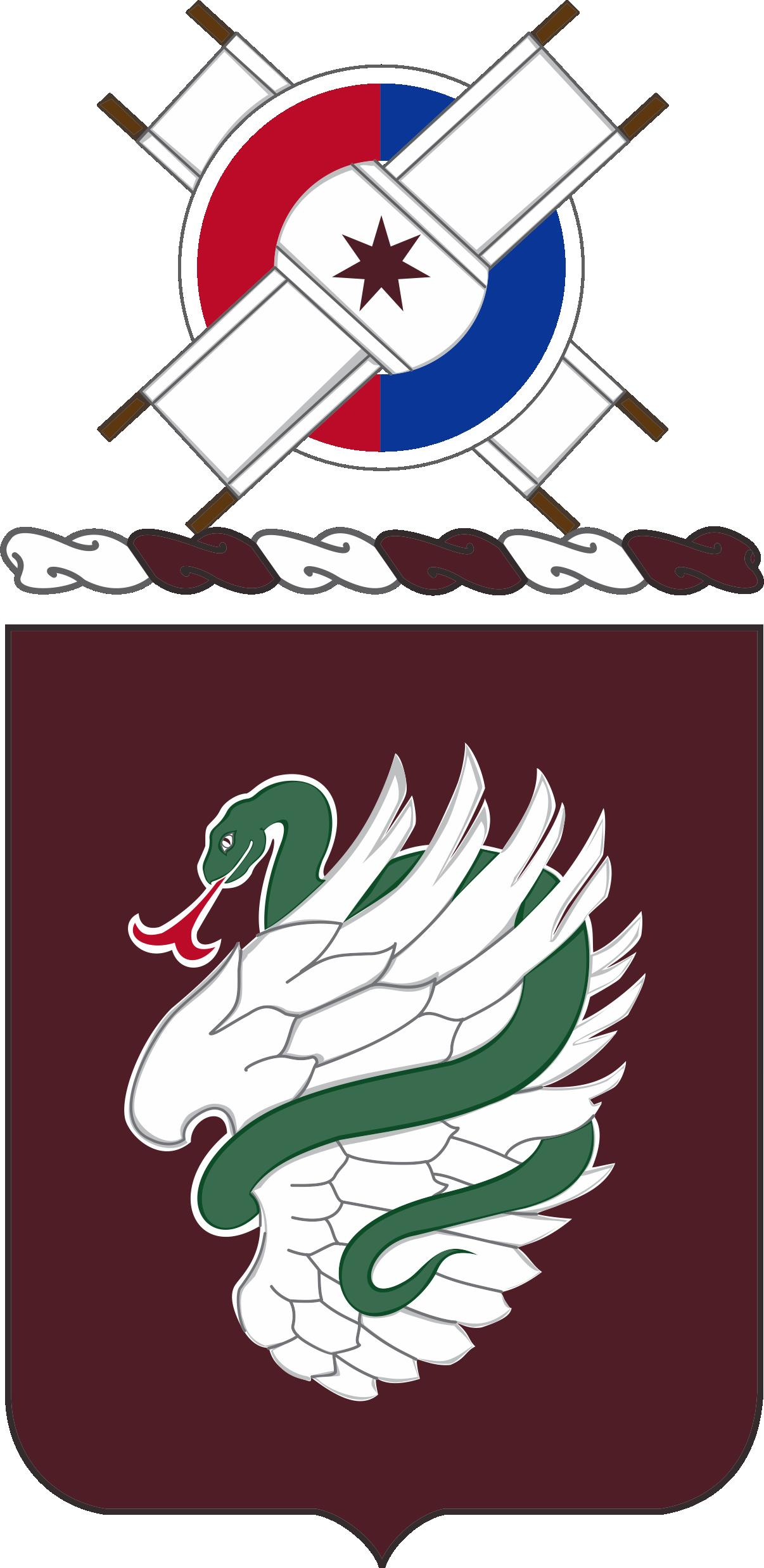
Coat of Arms, 326th Medical Battalion

=== Blazon ===
==== Shield ====
Sanguine, a wing Argent entwined with a serpent Vert langued Gules fimbriated of the second.

==== Crest ====
From a wreath Argent and Sanguine, two stretchers saltirewise Proper interlaced with an annulet per pale Gules and Azure, the outer edge fimbriated of the first, and charged with a mullet of seven points of the second.

==== Motto ====
ASSURGAM (I Rise Up).

=== Symbolism ===
==== Shield ====
Maroon and white are colors of the Army Medical Service. The design is adapted from the badge of the 326th Airborne Company, from which the Battalion is descended. The wing illustrates the parent organization's airborne function and the serpent represents its medical function.

==== Crest ====
The annulet and crossed stretchers refer to the crossroads and the encirclement of Bastogne. Red and blue are adapted from the coat of arms of Bastogne. The seven-pointed star, symbolic of the unit's skill, alludes to the original unit's seven decorations, World War II.

=== Background ===
The coat of arms was originally approved for the 501st Airborne Medical Battalion on 29 August 1952. It was rescinded on 29 October 1957. It was reinstated and redesignated for the 326th Medical Battalion on 5 April 1965. The insignia was amended to add a crest on 2 July 1965. It was redesignated for the 626th Support Battalion with the blazon and symbolism revised effective 16 April 1994.

== Background trimming and beret flash ==
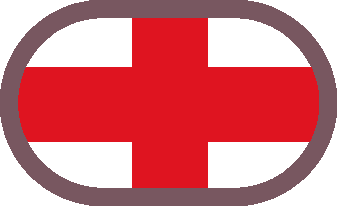
326th Medical Battalion Airborne Background Trimming, now worn by the 626th Light Support Battalion

626th Light Support Battalion Beret Flash

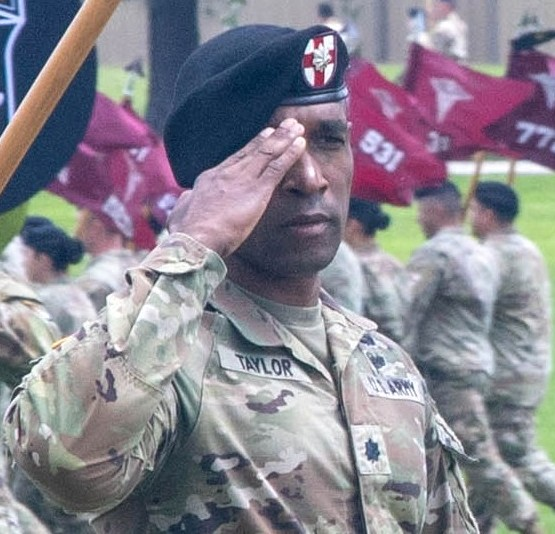
Commander of the 626th Light Support Battalion, during pass in review at the 101st Airborne Division's change of command ceremony (2025)

As a World War II airborne unit, the 326th Airborne Medical Company was authorized an airborne background trimming that was worn behind a paratrooper's Parachutist Badge. Today, as a formation within the 101st Airborne Division (Air Assault), the 326th's continues to wear their airborne background trimming but behind its soldier's Air Assault Badge. With the 626th Support Battalion assuming the heraldry of the 326th, the US Army Institute of Heraldry redesigned the 326th's airborne background trimming as the 626th's.

In 2024, soldiers assigned to the 101st Airborne Division began wearing their unit's historical organizational beret flashes from the 1970s, as well as new beret flashes patterned after their battalion's airborne background trimming, on the Army black beret, as illustrated in photographs of the 626th Light Support Battalion at the 101st's change of command ceremony on May 30th, 2025. Note that no documentation authorizing the creation and/or wear of the 626th Light Support Battalion Beret Flash has yet to be identified.

== Former Commanders ==
Rank	Commander Name	Branch	Start Date	End Date	Remarks
	Unknown		23 July 1918	11 December 1918	Not fully organized
			11 December 1918	16 October 1921	Inactive
COL	Gustavus I. Hogue	MC, ORC	17 October 1921	1 November 1922	
LTC	Frank F. Bowman	MC, ORC	24 November 1922	6 December 1923	
COL	George Van Ingen Brown	MC, ORC	6 December 1923	August 1927	
COL	Carl E. Gray, Jr.	MC, ORC	August 1927	~August 1928	
	Unknown		~August 1928	~June 1929	
MAJ	Ralph T. GilChrist	MC, ORC	~June 1929	~July 1929	
	Unknown		~July 1929	~May 1930	
LTC	Walter G. Darling	MC, ORC	~May 1930	~July 1930	
	Unknown		~July 1930	~May 1937	
COL	Harvey E. Webb	MC, ORC	~May 1937	12 June 1937	
	Unknown		13 June 1937	12 July 1937	
COL	William E. Braddock	MC, ORC	13 July 1937	~January 1941	
	Unknown		~January 1941		
MAJ	William E. Barfield	MC	15 August 1942	27 December 1944	Barfield was reassigned as the Division Surgeon
CPT	Roy H. Moore, Jr.	MC	28 December 1944	30 November 1945	
			1 December 1945	5 July 1948	Inactive
	Unknown		6 July 1948	22 April 1949	
			23 April 1949	24 August 1950	Inactive
	Unknown		25 August 1950	1 December 1953	
			2 December 1953	14 May 1954	Inactive
MAJ	Thomas P. Mullaney, Jr.	MC			In command in 1956
	Unknown				
MAJ	Jimmie Kanaya	MSC			Received Direct Commission while assigned to the 442d Regimental Combat Team in World War II. In command in 1960.
MAJ	George W. Lindsey, Sr.	MSC		30 October 1961	In command in 1961; per "Army Register," retired 30 October 1961
	Unknown				
MAJ	Foster C. McCaleb	MC	3 February 1964	July 1964	McCaleb is listed as being in command from the activation of the 326th Medical Battalion; he may have also commanded the 326th Medical Company prior to the conversion on 3 February.
LTC	Floyd W. Baker	MC	July 1964	September 1965	Retired as a Major general; Commander, 7th Medical Command, United States Army Health Services Command
MAJ	Francis Morgan, Jr.	MSC	September 1965	September 1966	
MAJ	Ran L. Phillips, Jr	MC	September 1966	December 1966	Left active duty as an LTC, retired as Brigadier general, USAR
LTC	Isadore O. Peppe	DC	January 1967	6 May 1967	
LTC	Ran L. Phillips, Jr	MC	7 May 1967	27 July 1968	
LTC	Bernard T. Mittemeyer	MC	28 July 1968	27 February 1969	Retired as a Lieutenant general, served as Surgeon General of the United States Army 1 October 1981—1 February 1985.
LTC	David K. Selby	MC	28 February 1969	20 July 1969	
LTC	George W. Ford	MC	21 July 1969	9 July 1970	
COL	Joseph F. Powers	MC	27 January 1970	9 July 1970	Promoted to Colonel while in command
LTC	Robert E. Day	MC	10 July 1970	23 June 1971	
MAJ	Larry L. Grabhorn	MC	24 June 1971	1 July 1971	
LTC	William H. Berner	MC	2 July 1971		
MAJ	Joseph U. Weaver, Jr.	MSC	11 April 1972		The 326th Medical Battalion (Airmobile) returned to Fort Campbell from Camp Eagle, Vietnam on 15 April 1972 absent the majority of its historical records, and the report referenced does not provide any information on the battalion prior to April 1972.
	Unknown				
LTC	Burton H. Kaplan	MC		January 1976	Also served as Division Surgeon
LTC	Patrick Henry Brady	MSC	January 1976	July 1977	Medal of Honor recipient; flew under Major Charles L. Kelly; retired as a Major general
	Unknown				
LTC	Edward J. Preston, Jr.	MSC		1982	
LTC	Eldon H. Ideus	MSC	1982	July 1984	Commanded the 1st Medical Group during Operation Desert Shield/Storm.
LTC	Jerome V. Foust	MSC	July 1984	July 1986	Later commanded 44th Medical Brigade in Panama and Desert Shield/Storm, Chief, Medical Service Corps 1992–1995; retired as a Brigadier general
LTC	Richard Pecoraro	MSC	July 1986	1988	
LTC	Jerry Baugher	MSC	1988	2 August 1990	
LTC	Tommy Mayes	MSC	2 August 1990	January 1991	
LTC	Michael Kimes	MC	January 1991	February 1991	Kimes was the Division Surgeon, and DA policy at the time required Medical Corps officers command units that were actively providing patient care; Kimes assumed command of the Battalion during the ground war
LTC	Tommy Mayes	MSC	February 1991	August 1992	Mayes resumed command after the end of ground combat operations
LTC	Randy Mazchek	MSC	August 1992		
	Unknown				

- ORC=Officer's Reserve Corps, a part of the forerunner to the United States Army Reserve
