= Patrick Henry Brady =

United States Army general

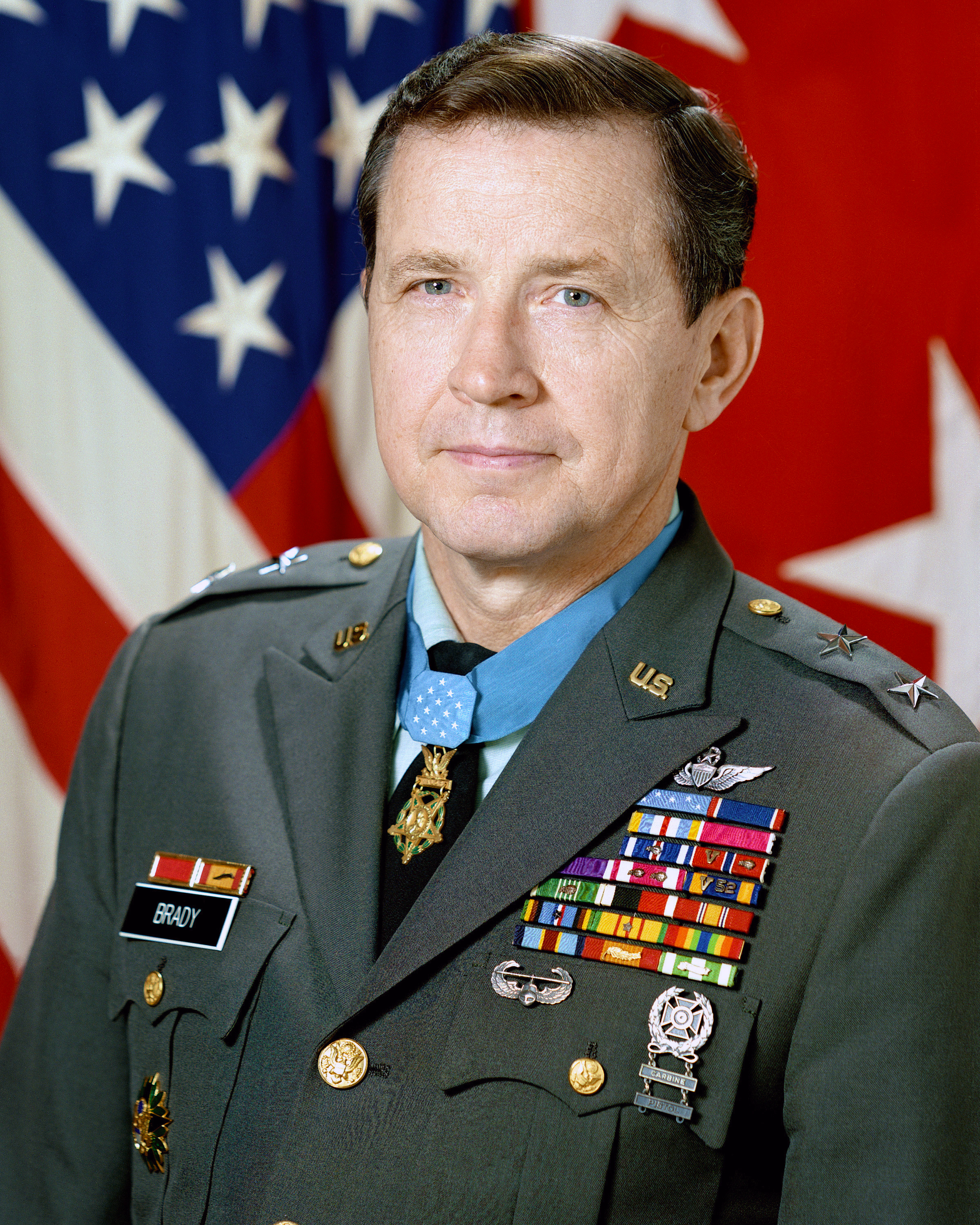
- Brady in 1989
- Born: October 1, 1936 (age 90); Philip, South Dakota, U.S.
- Spouse: Nancy Brady
- Military career
- Allegiance: United States
- Branch: United States Army
- Service years: 1959–1993
- Rank: Major General
- Unit: 54th Medical Detachment
- Commands: Detachment "A," 57th Medical Detachment; 326th Medical Battalion
- Conflicts: Vietnam War
- Awards: Medal of Honor; Distinguished Service Cross; Army Distinguished Service Medal (2); Defense Superior Service Medal; Legion of Merit; Distinguished Flying Cross (6); Bronze Star Medal with "V" Device (2); Air Medal with "V" Device (52); Purple Heart

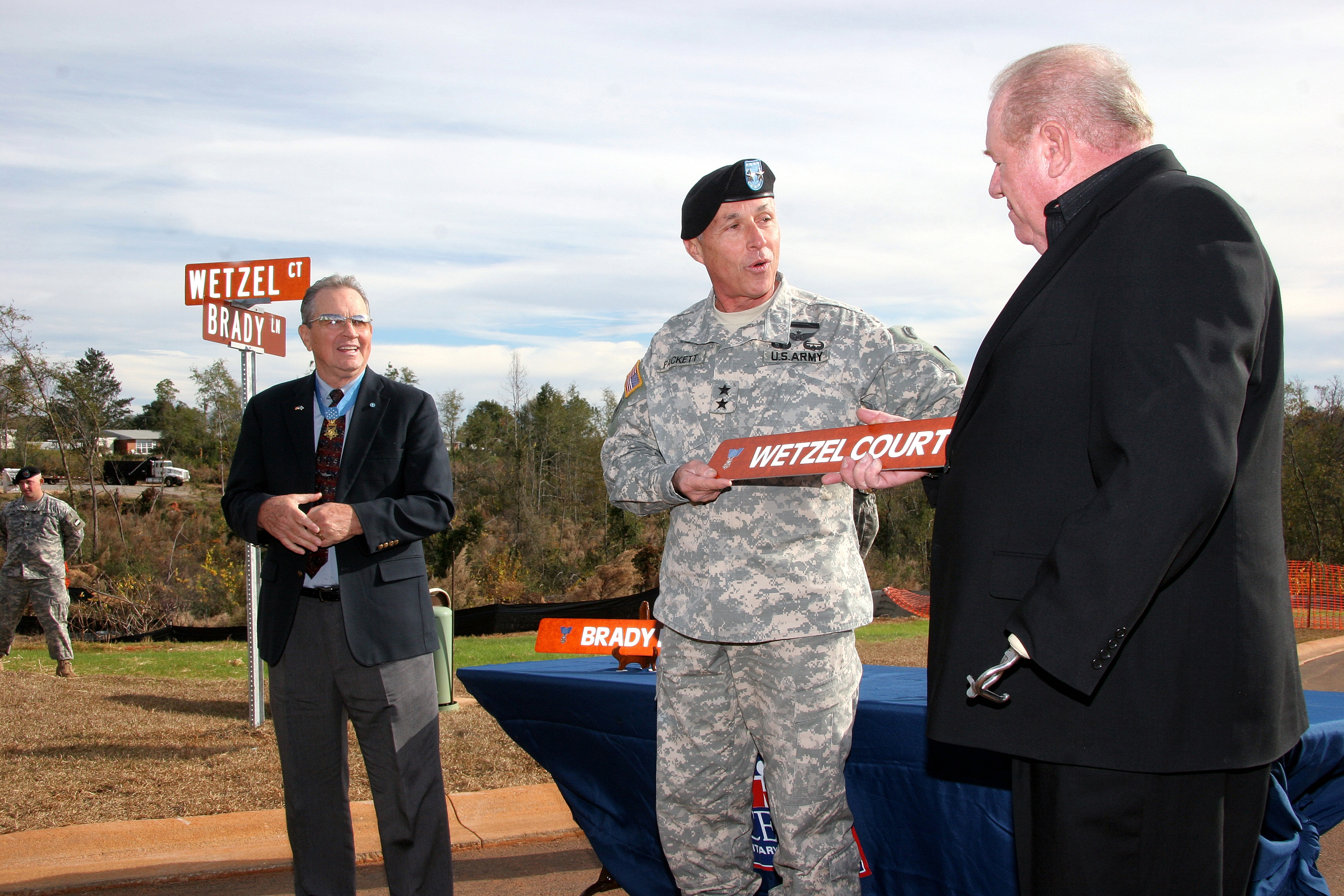
Brady (left) and fellow Medal of Honor recipient Gary Wetzel (right) during a ceremony to name streets in their honor at Fort Rucker, Alabama, in 2007

Patrick Henry Brady (born October 1, 1936), is a retired United States Army major general. While serving as a helicopter pilot in the Vietnam War, he received the Medal of Honor, the nation's highest military decoration for valor.

== Early life ==
Brady attended O'Dea High School in Seattle, Washington, an all-boys school run by the Congregation of Christian Brothers, where he was active in sports.

== Military career ==
While in college at Seattle University, Brady initially hated the compulsory Reserve Officers' Training Corps (ROTC) program and was kicked out. Brady realized he would probably be drafted after graduation and reentered the ROTC program in order to enter military service as an officer. After graduation, he was commissioned a second lieutenant in the Army Medical Service Corps on March 20, 1959. On April 4, he went on active duty. He served in West Berlin from September 1959 to August 1961 with the 6th Infantry Brigade. In August 1961, he became the Motor Pool Officer of the hospital in the 279th Station Hospital in West Berlin. He became the Detachment Commander in June 1962 until October 1962. In December 1963, he graduated from the United States Army Aviation School at Fort Rucker, Alabama. In January 1964, he deployed to Vietnam.

During his first tour in Vietnam, from January 1964 to January 1965, then-Captain Brady served as a Dust Off pilot with the 57th Medical Detachment (Helicopter Ambulance), where his commanding officer was Major Charles L. Kelly. After Kelly's death on July 1, 1964, Brady took command of Detachment A, 57th Medical Detachment, at Sóc Trăng. The following day, a commander tossed the bullet that killed Kelly on Brady's desk in front of Captain Brady and asked if they were going to stop flying so aggressively. Brady picked up the bullet and replied, "we are going to keep flying exactly the way Kelly taught us to fly, without hesitation, anytime, anywhere."

On his second tour of duty in Vietnam, 1967 to 1968, Brady, now a major, was second in command of the 54th Medical Detachment. It was during this second tour in Vietnam that Brady was awarded the Medal of Honor. Brady flew over 2,000 combat missions and evacuated more than 5000 wounded during his two tours of duty in South Vietnam.

Brady retired from the United States Army as a major general on September 1, 1993, after 34 years of service.

In October 2024, Brady joined 15 other Medal of Honor recipients in publicly endorsing Donald Trump for president.

== Awards and honors ==
Brady's military decorations and awards include:

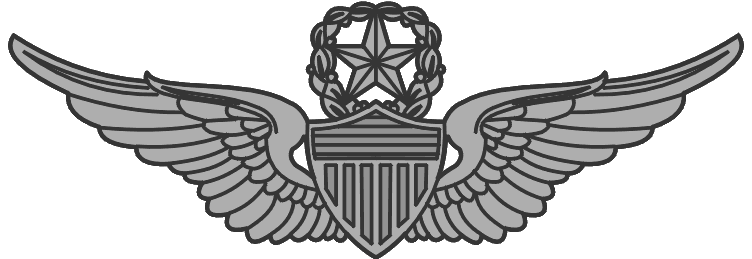

Master Army Aviator Badge
Medal of Honor		Distinguished Service Cross
Army Distinguished Service Medal with bronze oak leaf cluster	Defense Superior Service Medal	Legion of Merit
Distinguished Flying Cross with silver oak leaf cluster	Bronze Star Medal with Valor device and bronze oak leaf cluster	Purple Heart
Meritorious Service Medal with two bronze oak leaf clusters	Air Medal with Valor device and award numeral 52	Army Commendation Medal with bronze oak leaf cluster
Army of Occupation Medal with 'Germany' clasp	National Defense Service Medal with service star	Armed Forces Expeditionary Medal with service star
Vietnam Service Medal with silver campaign star	Korea Defense Service Medal	Army Service Ribbon
Army Overseas Service Ribbon with Award numeral 5	Republic of Vietnam Cross of Gallantry with Palm and silver star	Republic of Vietnam Campaign Medal

Army Meritorious Unit Commendation	Republic of Vietnam Gallantry Cross Unit Citation

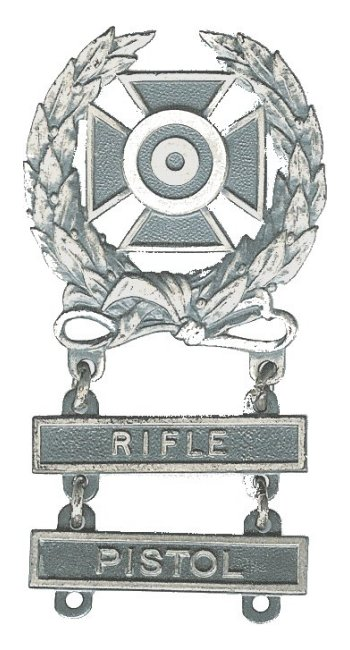

Expert Marksmanship Badge with rifle and pistol bars	Air Assault Badge

=== Medal of Honor citation ===
Patrick Brady's Medal of Honor citation reads:

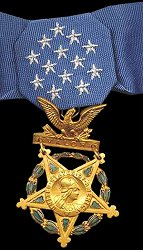
Medal of Honor

Rank and organization: Major, U.S. Army, Medical Service Corps, 54th Medical Detachment, 67th Medical Group, 44th Medical Brigade.

Place and date: Near Chu Lai, Republic of Vietnam, January 6, 1968.

Entered service at: Seattle, Washington

Born: October 1, 1936, Philip, South Dakota

CITATION:

For conspicuous gallantry and intrepidity in action at the risk of his life above and beyond the call of duty, Maj. BRADY distinguished himself while serving in the Republic of Vietnam commanding a UH-1H ambulance helicopter, volunteered to rescue wounded men from a site in enemy held territory which was reported to be heavily defended and to be blanketed by fog. To reach the site he descended through heavy fog and smoke and hovered slowly along a valley trail, turning his ship sideward to blow away the fog with the backwash from his rotor blades. Despite the unchallenged, close-range enemy fire, he found the dangerously small site, where he successfully landed and evacuated 2 badly wounded South Vietnamese soldiers. He was then called to another area completely covered by dense fog where American casualties lay only 50 meters from the enemy. Two aircraft had previously been shot down and others had made unsuccessful attempts to reach this site earlier in the day. With unmatched skill and extraordinary courage, Maj. BRADY made 4 flights to this embattled landing zone and successfully rescued all the wounded. On his third mission of the day Maj. Brady once again landed at a site surrounded by the enemy. The friendly ground force, pinned down by enemy fire, had been unable to reach and secure the landing zone. Although his aircraft had been badly damaged and his controls partially shot away during his initial entry into this area, he returned minutes later and rescued the remaining injured. Shortly thereafter, obtaining a replacement aircraft, Maj. BRADY was requested to land in an enemy minefield where a platoon of American soldiers was trapped. A mine detonated near his helicopter, wounding 2 crew members and damaging his ship. In spite of this, he managed to fly 6 severely injured patients to medical aid. Throughout that day Maj. BRADY utilized 3 helicopters to evacuate a total of 51 seriously wounded men, many of whom would have perished without prompt medical treatment. Maj. BRADY'S bravery was in the highest traditions of the military service and reflects great credit upon himself and the U.S. Army.

=== Distinguished Service Cross citation ===
Citation:

The President of the United States of America, authorized by Act of Congress, July 9, 1918 (amended by act of July 25, 1963), takes pleasure in presenting the Distinguished Service Cross to Major (Medical Service Corps) Patrick Henry Brady (ASN: 0-88015), United States Army, for extraordinary heroism in connection with military operations involving conflict with an armed hostile force in the Republic of Vietnam, while serving with 54th Medical Detachment (Helicopter Ambulance), 74th Medical Battalion, 67th Medical Group, 44th Medical Brigade. Major Brady distinguished himself by exceptionally valorous actions on 2 and 3 October 1967 as pilot of an ambulance helicopter on a rescue mission near Tam Ky. A friendly force requested extraction of several seriously wounded soldiers from a mountainous jungle landing zone, and Major Brady volunteered to attempt the rescue although heavy storms had grounded numerous aircraft in the area. Flying by instruments and radar, he arrived in the area of engagement and began a vertical descent into the tight landing zone by the light of flares. Unable to see more than a few feet outside his aircraft, he skillfully maneuvered to the friendly forces, loaded his ship to capacity and quickly flew to the hospital. The storm increased in intensity and made flying extremely hazardous, but he returned to the pickup site and once more attempted to land. As he approached the area, enemy forces directed devastating machine gun and automatic weapons fire at him. Completely disregarding his personal welfare, he flew low over the area for forty-five minutes before he located the friendly forces. Guiding himself by the flashes of the enemy weapons, he flew into the landing zone through a curtain of fire and loaded eight patients. He quickly flew the patients to the hospital, and once more returned to pick up the remaining casualties and carry them to safety. His fearless actions were responsible for the rapid and successful evacuation of several wounded fellow soldiers. Major Brady's extraordinary heroism and devotion to duty were in keeping with the highest traditions of the military service and reflect great credit upon himself, his unit, and the United States Army.

=== Personal honors ===
- Chairman, Citizens Flag Alliance
- Dustoff Association Hall of Fame, February 17, 2001, Fort Sam Houston, TX
- Gold Medal Award, Fort Sam AFB, San Antonio, TX, Veterans Day November 11, 2015
- Inducted into the National Aviation Hall of Fame in 2013.

== See also ==
- List of Medal of Honor recipients
- List of Medal of Honor recipients for the Vietnam War
- "Dead Men Flying"
