= Bernhard T. Mittemeyer =

Surgeon General of the US Army (1930–2023)

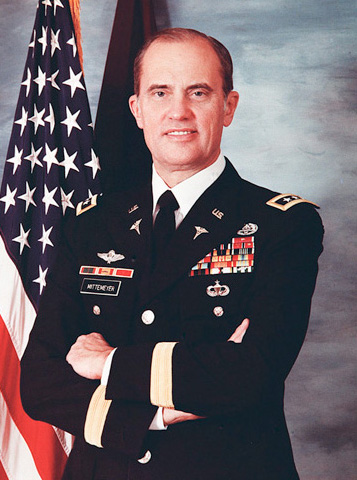
- Born: October 30, 1930; Paramaribo, Suriname
- Died: January 25, 2023 (aged 92); Lubbock, Texas, U.S.
- Military career
- Allegiance: United States of America
- Branch: United States Army
- Service years: 1957–1985
- Rank: Lieutenant general
- Commands: Surgeon General of the United States Army; 326th Medical Battalion (Airmobile), 101st Airborne Division
- Conflicts: Cold War; Vietnam War
- Awards: Legion of Merit (with Oak Leaf Cluster); Distinguished Flying Cross; Bronze Star with V Device (with Oak Leaf Cluster); Meritorious Service Medal; Air Medal; Army Commendation Medal; National Defense Service Medal; Combat Medical Badge; Senior Parachutist Badge; Vietnam Service Medal with Three Campaign Stars; Cross of Gallantry with Bronze Star (Vietnamese); Civil Actions Honor Medal, First Class (Vietnamese); Medical Meritorious Award, First Class (Vietnamese); Armed Forces Honor Medal, First Class (Vietnamese); Republic of Vietnam Campaign Medal
- Other work: Chief of urological surgery at Texas Tech University Health Sciences Center

Bernhard Theodore Mittemeyer (October 30, 1930 – January 25, 2023) was a United States Army lieutenant general who served as Surgeon General of the United States Army between 1981 and 1985.

== Early life, education, and career ==
Mittemeyer was born in Paramaribo, Suriname, on October 30, 1930. At the age of 14, Mittemeyer emigrated to the United States during World War II.

While attending college at Moravian College and medical school at Temple University School of Medicine, he was deferred from the draft. However, after graduation, he was drafted into the Army in 1957. Following initial accession training, he volunteered for the airborne forces since the 101st and 82nd had liberated his home country of the Netherlands during the war. He was assigned to the 101st. After six months, he became the division surgeon for General Westmoreland.

Soon thereafter, however, Mittemeyer announced his resignation to Gen. Westmoreland. When Gen. Westmorland inquired why he was leaving, Mittemeyer pointed out that he was not in the regular army since he was not a citizen. Westmoreland arranged his citizenship so that he could become part of the regular army. Mittemeyer then accepted an Army urological residency. In 1968, he deployed to Vietnam, where he commanded the 326th Medical Battalion (Airmobile) from 28 July 1968 to 27 February 1969.

During his tenure as Surgeon General of the Army and working in Military District of Washington (MDW), he instituted Army Physical Fitness Test (APFT), later adopted by MDW-wide and now simply called Physical Fitness Test (PFT), a set of fitness tests including push-ups, sit-ups, and a timed two-mile run that now applies to all 85,000 military employees of MDW.

After serving as Surgeon General of the Army, he retired on February 28, 1985. He served as the chief of urological surgery at Texas Tech University Health Sciences Center, and retired on August 31, 2010.

== Death ==
Mittemeyer died in Lubbock, Texas, on January 25, 2023, at the age of 92.

== Awards and decorations ==
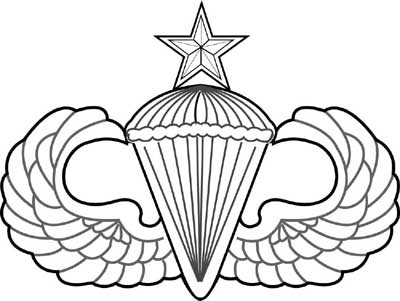
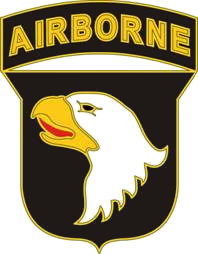
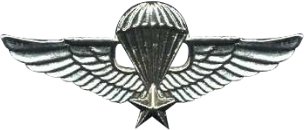
Combat Medical Badge
Senior Parachutist Badge
101st Airborne Division Combat Service Identification Badge
Vietnam Master Parachutist Badge

Legion of Merit with one bronze oak leaf cluster
Distinguished Flying Cross
Bronze Star with "V" device and oak leaf cluster
Meritorious Service Medal
Air Medal with bronze award numeral 1
Army Commendation Medal
Army Meritorious Unit Commendation
National Defense Service Medal
Vietnam Service Medal with three bronze service stars
Army Service Ribbon
Army Overseas Service Ribbon with award numeral 1
Vietnam Gallantry Cross with bronze star
Vietnam Armed Forces Honor Medal, First Class
Vietnam Civil Actions Medal, First Class
Vietnam Meritorious Medical Award, First Class
Republic of Vietnam Gallantry Cross Unit Citation
Republic of Vietnam Civil Actions Medal Unit Citation
Vietnam Campaign Medal
