= 101st Sustainment Brigade =

101st Division Sustainment Brigade
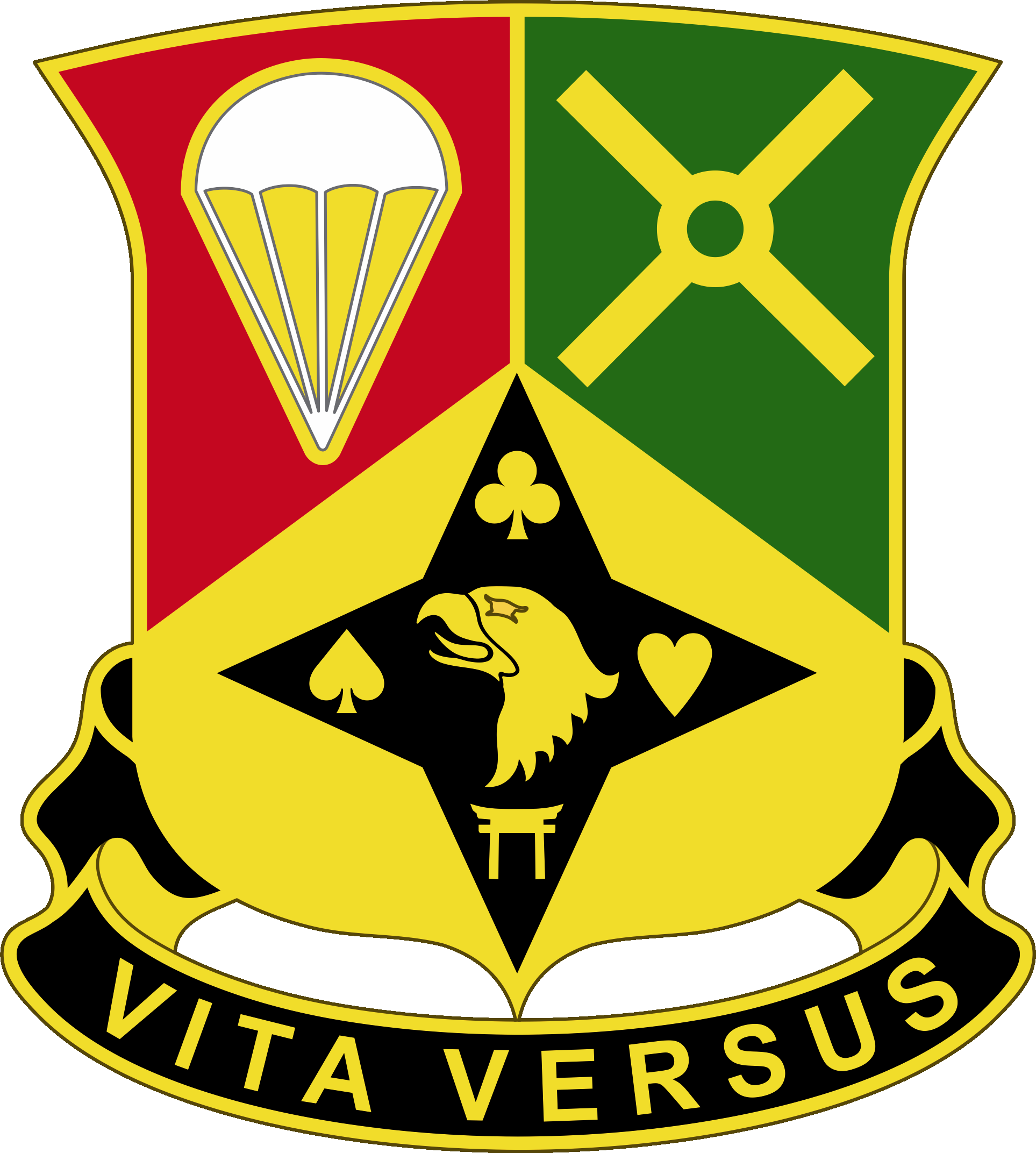
- 101st Division Sustainment Brigade distinctive unit insignia
- Country: United States
- Allegiance: United States Army
- Branch: Active duty
- Type: Sustainment Brigade
- Role: Sustainment
- Size: Brigade
- Part of: FORSCOM
- Garrison/HQ: Fort Campbell, Kentucky
- Motto: Vita Versus (Lifeliner)

Insignia
- Background trimming of the Brigade and subordinate units

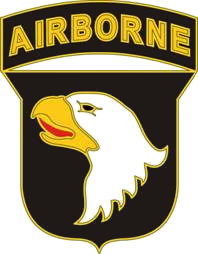
- Combat Service Identification Badge (CSIB)

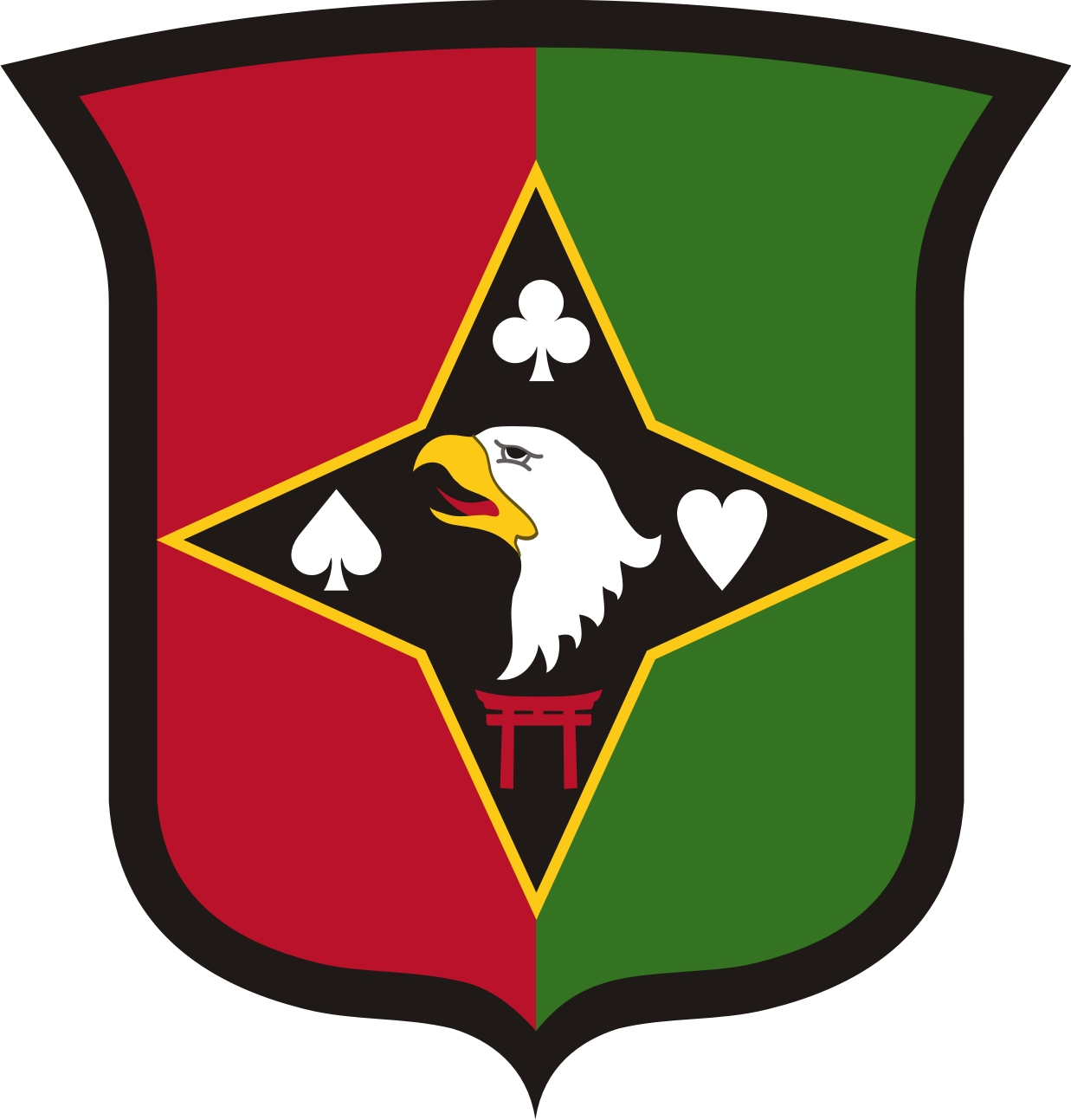
- Former shoulder sleeve insignia and CSIB of the Brigade

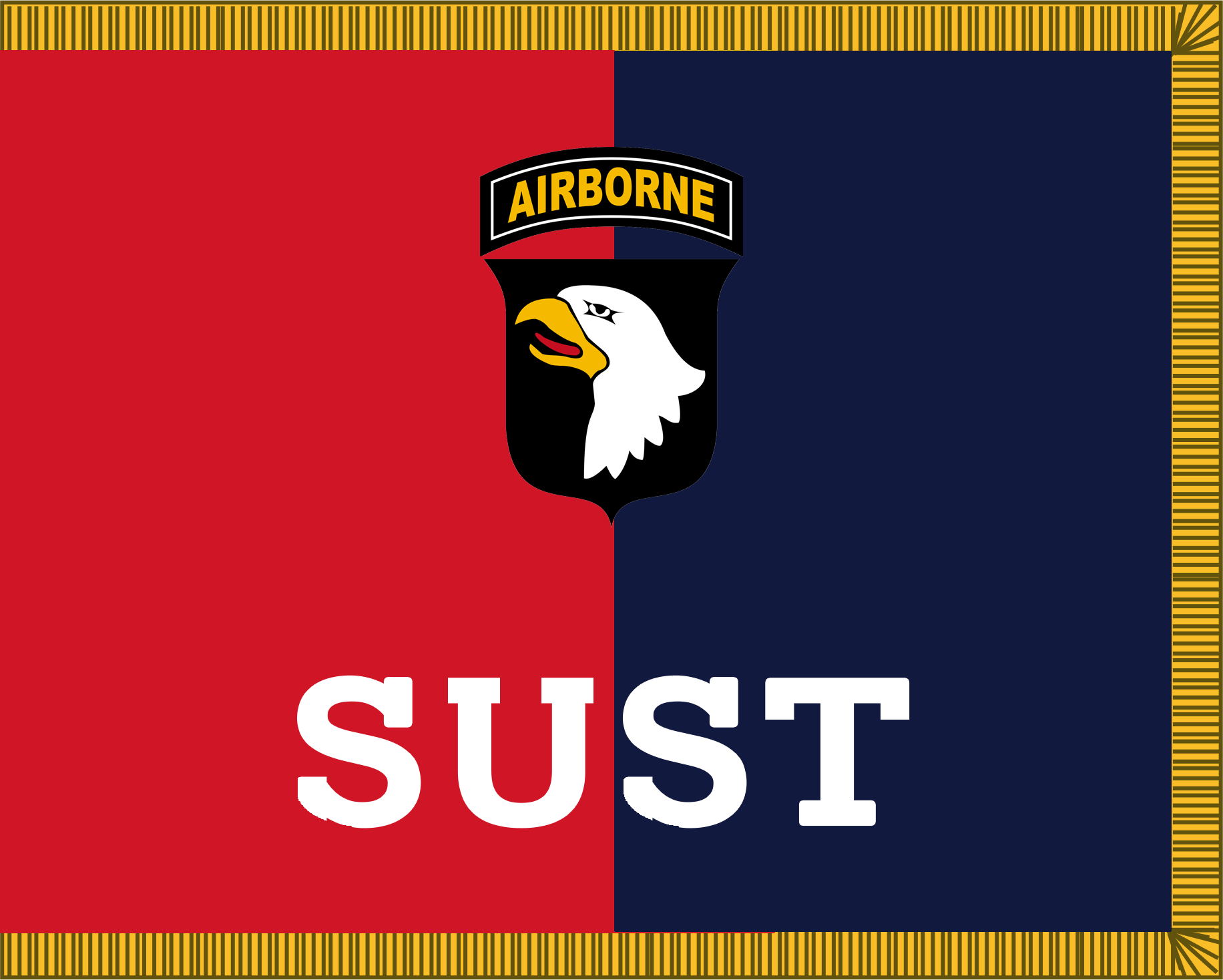
- 101st Division Sustainment Brigade Flag

The 101st Division Sustainment Brigade is a sustainment brigade of the United States Army based at Fort Campbell providing logistical support to the 101st Airborne Division. Formerly a separate unit under the command of United States Army Forces Command, it became a division sustainment brigade in 2015 and adopted the wear of the division SSI. (Note: 101st Sustainment Brigade is the redesignation of the former 101st Airborne Division Support Command. (Some subordinate units of the 101st Sustainment Brigade were once part of the 101st Support Group (Corps), a separate, non-divisional unit with a different statement of lineage and honors. It was redesignated on 16 September 2004 as the 101st Support Brigade and then as the 101st Sustainment Brigade on 21 April 2005.) According to the May–June 2006 issue of Army Logistician, page 10, sustainment brigades fell under the theater support command, not the division, but were placed under the operational control of a division for a specific mission or operation. The 101st Sustainment Brigade wore its own separate brigade patch, approved effective 17 November 2009, until it became a divisional unit in 2016.TIOH – Heraldry – 101st Sustainment Brigade)

== Organization ==
The 101st Sustainment Brigade was a separate brigade under FORSCOM and became part of the 101st Airborne Division in 2015.

- 101st Sustainment Brigade
  - 101st Special Troops Battalion "Steady Eagle"
    - Headquarters and Headquarters Company "Angry Dogs"
    - 9th Theater Gateway
    - 58th Signal Company "Mandalorians"
    - 101st Financial Management Support Company "Eagle Paymasters"
    - 101st Human Resources Company "Vipers"
    - 619th Field Feeding Company "Fire Eagles"
  - 129th Division Sustainment Support Battalion "Hammer Down"
    - Headquarters and Headquarters Detachment
    - Alpha Company, (formerly 227th Composite Truck Company)
    - Bravo Company, (formerly 584th Ordnance Company)
    - Charlie Company, (formerly 74th Composite Truck Company)
    - 372d Inland Cargo Transfer Company
    - 613th MCT
    - 632d MCT
    - 541st Transportation Company
    - 594th Transportation Company
  - 426th Light Support Battalion "To The Task"
  - 526th Light Support Battalion "Best by Performance"
  - 626th Light Support Battalion "Assurgam"
  - 716th Military Police Battalion "Peacekeepers,"

== History ==
The 101st Airborne Division Support Command (DISCOM) was activated on 1 July 1956 at Fort Campbell as the 101st Airborne Division support group. The support group was composed of the 326th Airborne Medical Company, the 426th Airborne Quartermaster Company, the 101st Parachute Support and Maintenance Company, the Headquarters, Headquarters Detachment and the Division Band.

From 1974–1979, 101st DISCOM wore dark-blue berets with a unique organizational beret flash (shown above). This flash was reintroduced in 2024/2025 for wear on the Army black beret.

Organizational changes occurred in April 1957. On 25 April 1957, the 101st Airborne Division Support Group was reorganized and re-designated as Support Group, 101st Airborne Division. The 426th Airborne Quartermaster Company became the 426th Supply and Transportation Company. The 101st Parachute Support and Maintenance Company separated from the group, and the 101st Administration Company and Company B, 313th Army Security Agency Battalion were added to the group. In February 1964, the Support Group was reorganized and re-designated as the 101st Airborne Division Support Command. Subordinate units were the 326th Medical Battalion, the 426th Supply and Transportation Company, the Headquarters and Headquarters Company, the Division Band, the 101st Administration Company and the 101st Quartermaster Company (Air Equipment Support).

In October 1992, the Division Support Command was provisionally reorganized into three support battalions, one main support battalion, the 101st Personnel Service Company, the 101st Finance Battalion, the Headquarters and Headquarters Company and the Division Band. On 16 April 1994, the DISCOM consisted of the Headquarters and Headquarters Company, the 63rd Chemical Company, the 426th Forward Support Battalion, the 526th Forward Support Battalion, the 626th Forward Support Battalion, the 801st Main Support Battalion and the 8th Battalion, 101st Aviation Regiment (AVIM).

11 September 2001 signaled another chapter in the DISCOM history. The 626th Forward Support Battalion, along with elements from the 801st Main Support Battalion, 8th Battalion, 101st Aviation Regiment and DISCOM Headquarters, all deployed to Afghanistan where they supported Task Force Rakkasan during Operation Enduring Freedom. In February 2003, the Division Support Command deployed to the Middle East in support of Operation Iraqi Freedom, providing Combat Service Support to the 101st Airborne Division (Air Assault).

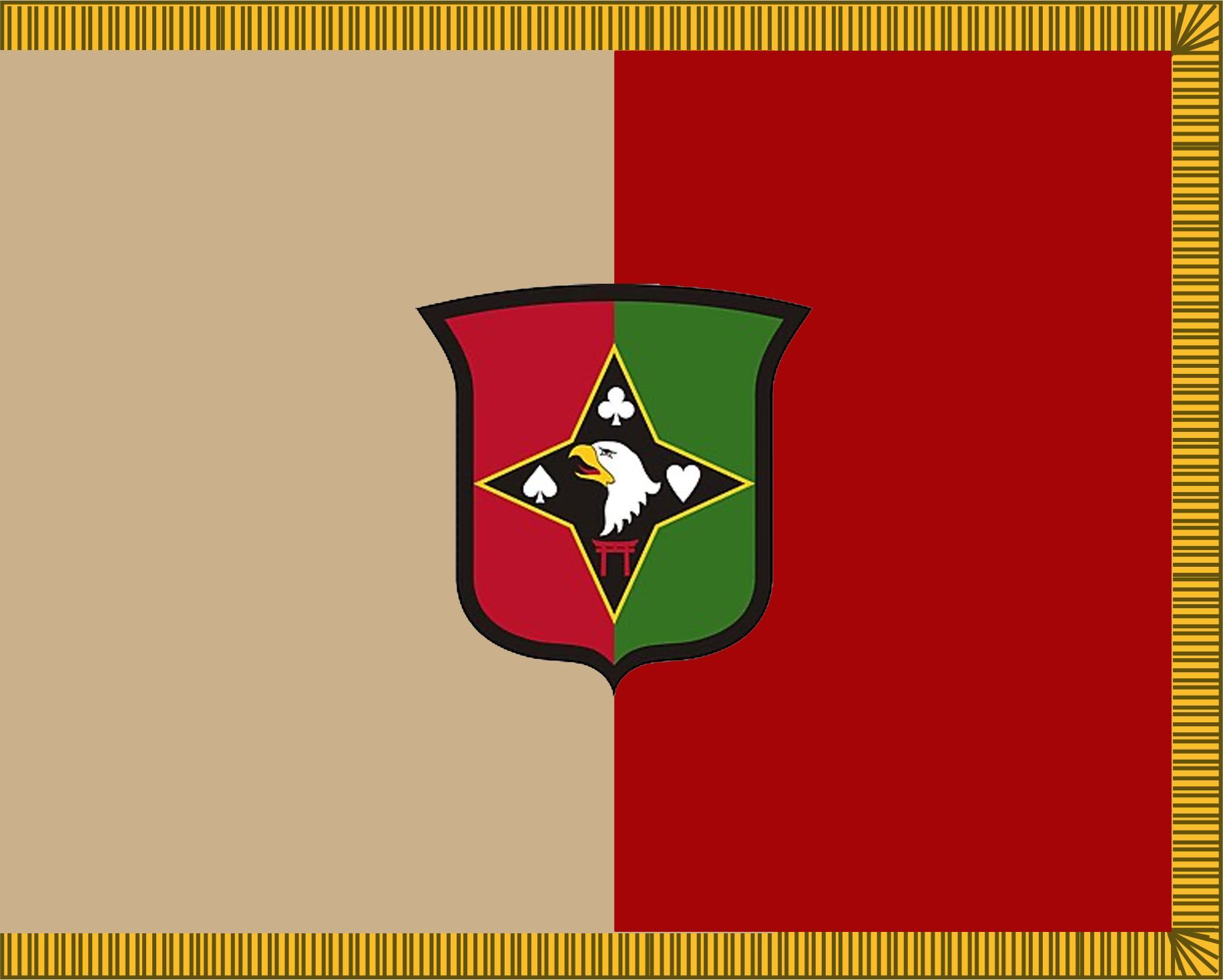
101st Sustainment Brigade Flag

On 16 September 2004, the 101st Airborne Division Support Command was reorganized and re-designated as the 101st Support Brigade, being officially relieved from the 101st Airborne Division, thus changing their patch from the "Old Abe" of the renown 101st Airborne Division. on 21 April 2005, the unit was redesignated as the 101st Sustainment Brigade. The unit deployed to Iraq in its new capacity in late 2005.

In late 2014, the 101st Sustainment Brigade was deployed to Liberia in support of Joint Forces Command-United Assistance in hindering the spread of the Ebola outbreak.

On 30 July 2015, the 101st Sustainment Brigade was redesignated as the 101st Airborne Division Sustainment Brigade. Being officially realigned back to the 101st Airborne, they reverted to wearing the "Old Abe" patch.

In 2018, the unit was deployed to Afghanistan.

The unit is informally known as the "LifeLiners".
