= Charles L. Kelly =

US Army helicopter pilot (1925–1964)

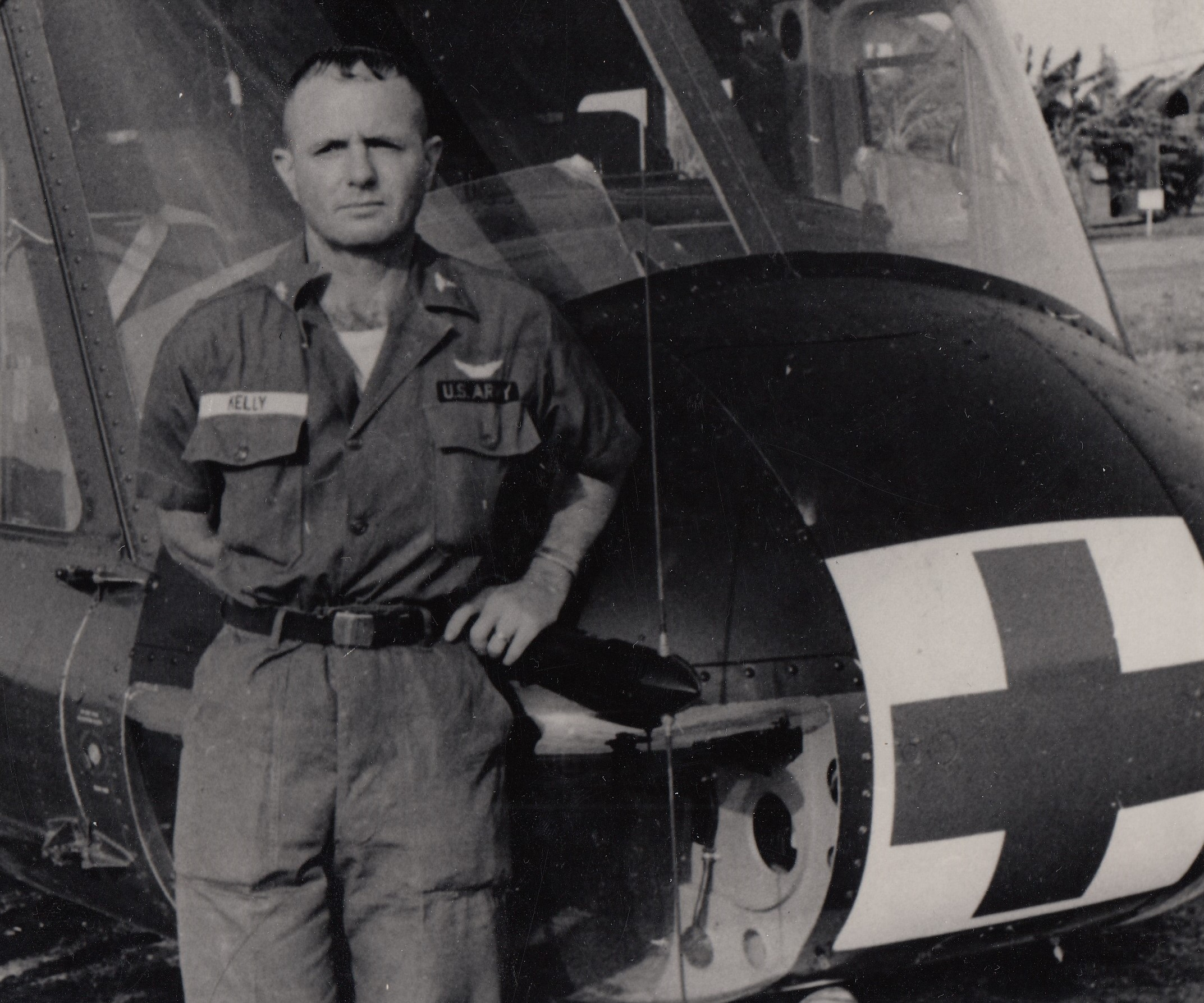
- Major Charles L. Kelly, Medical Service Corps, United States Army
- Born: April 10, 1925; Wadley, Georgia, U.S.
- Died: July 1, 1964 (aged 39); Vinh Long, Republic of Vietnam
- Burial place: Screven County Memorial Cemetery, Sylvania, Georgia
- Military career
- Allegiance: United States
- Branch: United States Army
- Service years: 1941–1945, 1951–1964
- Rank: Major
- Commands: 50th Medical Detachment (Helicopter Ambulance) 54th Medical Detachment (Helicopter Ambulance) 57th Medical Detachment (Helicopter Ambulance)
- Conflicts: World War II; Vietnam Advisory Campaign
- Awards: Distinguished Service Cross Silver Star; Distinguished Flying Cross with 2 Oak Leaf Clusters; Bronze Star; Purple Heart with Oak Leaf Cluster; Air Medal with Bronze Numeral 18; Army Commendation Medal; National Order of Vietnam, Fifth Class; Vietnam Distinguished Service Order, First Class Vietnam Cross of Gallantry with Palm

Signature
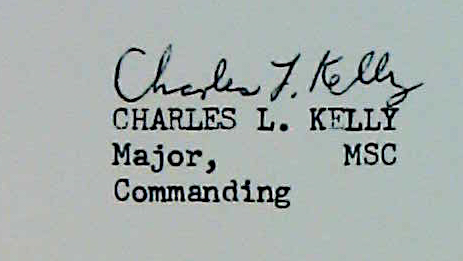

Major Charles Livingston Kelly (10 April 1925 – 1 July 1964) was a United States Army helicopter pilot and medical evacuation unit commander during the Vietnam War. Because of the central role he played in the development of early battlefield evacuation techniques during the war—and the central role his death on the battlefield played in cementing those techniques in Army doctrine at a time they were being questioned by line commanders—he earned the sobriquet "The Father of Dustoff".

== Early life ==
Charles Livingston Kelly was born on 10 April 1925 in Wadley, Georgia, the eldest of three sons born to Charlton L. Kelly and Ruth Amelia Moore Kelly. His father died when he was six years old, and his mother never remarried. He was raised in Sylvania, Georgia. Kelly was of Irish descent.

== World War II ==
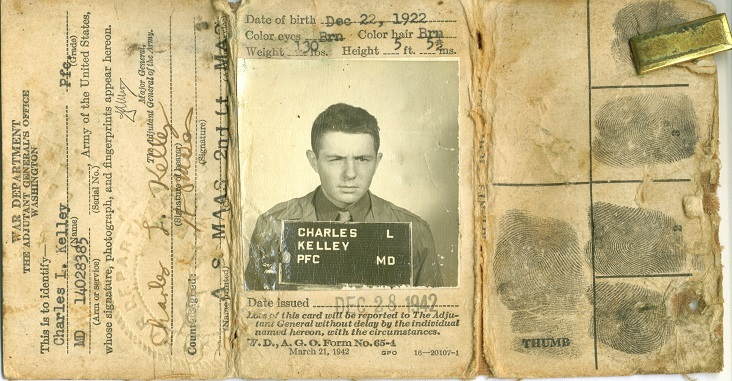
ID Card used by Charles L. Kelly during his enlisted service in World War II

Kelly dropped out of high school and lied about his age in order to enlist in the Army at the age of 15. He used a birth date of 22 December 1922 and enlisted under the name "Charles L. Kelley". He reported for active duty at Fort Screven, Georgia, on 25 February 1941 for 1 year of service as an army medic. As enlistment contracts at that time included an "or duration plus six months" clause, Kelly left the service as a corporal on 3 August 1945. He served overseas with the 30th Infantry Division and, although he was listed as a medic as late as May 1944, he was serving as an infantryman when he was wounded by an artillery shell fragment during the battle for Aachen, Germany. Kelly's injury was a severe one, a compound fracture of the fibula which kept him hospitalized for treatment and recovery from the time he was wounded in October 1944 until June 1945. Patrick Henry Brady, who served under Kelly in South Vietnam, said that Kelly's experience as a wounded infantryman was what would later drive him to become a medical evacuation pilot.

== Post-war activities ==
After his discharge from the Army, Kelly returned to Sylvania, Georgia. He completed his education at the Sylvania High School, participating in the senior play and graduating in 1947 as the class President. He was also active in the Sylvania Junior Chamber of Commerce, where he served as Secretary-Treasurer, and in the George Alexander Post of the American Legion. It was also during this time that he courted, and married, Jessie Hillis of Sylvania. They had a son, Charles Kelly Jr., and two daughters, Carol and Barbara.

Following his graduation from high school, Kelly enrolled in the Georgia Teachers College in Statesboro, Georgia, graduating with a Bachelor of Science in 1950. He then followed that by obtaining a Master of Arts in geology from the George Peabody College in Nashville, Tennessee.

After obtaining his master's degree, Kelly taught for a short time in Warm Springs, Georgia, before applying for a commission in the Army. He accepted a commission as a second lieutenant in the United States Army Reserve on 25 October 1951 and was ordered to active duty—the customary career path for a Medical Service Corps Officer at the time. He accepted a Regular Army commission in the Medical Service Corps on 16 June 1954.

== Assignments ==
The table below lists Kelly's assignments with details where available. His service as commander of the 57th Medical Detachment (Helicopter Ambulance) in South Vietnam is covered in greater detail in subsequent sections.

From	To	Duty position	Unit	Location	Remarks
25 February 1941	3 August 1945	Medic and Infantryman	30th Infantry Division	United States and Europe	Kelly was severely wounded in the right leg during the battle for Aachen, Germany. He left the service as a corporal.
November 1951	December 1951	Officer student	Medical Field Service School	Fort Sam Houston, Texas	Medical Service Corps Officer Basic Course
January 1952	April 1952	Officer student	United States Army Airborne School	Fort Benning, Georgia	Basic Airborne School
May 1952	January 1953	"Various duties"	Medical Company, 188th Airborne Infantry Regiment, 11th Airborne Division	Fort Campbell, Kentucky	The Medical Company of an Infantry Regiment in the 1950s consolidated the battalion medical platoons and the regimental surgeon's office for administrative purposes but provided only Level/Role I medical support.
February 1953	February 1954		Medical Detachment, 710th Tank Battalion, 11th Airborne Division	Fort Campbell, Kentucky	No duty title listed—most likely "Field Medical Assistant"
March 1954	October 1954	Officer student	United States Army Aviation School	Fort Sill, Oklahoma and Fort Sam Houston, Texas	Graduated Flight School on 2 October 1954
October 1954	December 1954	Training officer	47th Medical Detachment (Helicopter Ambulance)	Fort Sam Houston, Texas and Illesheim, West Germany	The detachment sailed for West Germany in November 1954
December 1954	October 1957	Rotary wing aviator	53rd Medical Detachment (Helicopter Ambulance)	Griesheim Army Airfield, West Germany	
November 1957	June 1958	Officer student	Army Medical Service School	Fort Sam Houston, Texas	
June 1958	February 1959	Assistant operations and training officer	55th Medical Group	Fort Bragg, North Carolina	
March 1959	January 1960	Administrative Officer to Aviation Medical Advisor and Instructor, Air Mobility Branch, Department of Tactics	United States Army Aviation School	Fort Rucker, Alabama	Rater's comments from Kelly's Officer Efficiency Report, dated 19 February 1960: "Capt Kelly has demonstrated a remarkable ability to instruct in medical subjects. He is noted for his calm aplomb, exceptionally fine build, poise, and commanding voice on and off the instructional platform. He thinks very clearly, is alert to changes that will affect the instruction that is his responsibility, and possesses a high degree of common sense. One of his outstanding assets is his ability to organize instructional material well. Another of his assets is the strong initiative he displays in developing instructional material and in keeping abreast of current doctrine in the medical field. During the period he has served under me, he has proven to be an exceptionally capable administrator while acting in the capacity of a branch supervisor. He has also demonstrated a high degree of positive leadership in supervising the activities of several officers assigned to this branch. He is noted for his extreme devotion to duty and it has become evident that he is strongly motivated by a desire to perform better than his contemporaries. He is morally of strong character and is devoted to his family."
February 1960	July 1960	Student, Fixed Wing Aviator Qualification Course	United States Army Aviation School	Fort Rucker, Alabama	
September 1960	September 1961	Commander	50th Medical Detachment (Helicopter Ambulance)	Uijongbu, Republic of Korea	Rater comments, from Kelly's officer evaluation report dated 2 October 1961: "This special report is made because of the outstanding performance of this officer. On the eve of his departure, Lt. General Hugh P. Harris, Commanding General of I Corps (Group) awarded him the Army Commendation Medal for his outstanding accomplishments as the Commander of the 50th Medical Detachment (HA) and his repeated demonstration of his technical skill as a pilot. This officer received a letter of appreciation from the Surgeon General, Republic of Korea Army (ROK Army) for his service to the ROK Army which resulted in the saving of many lives of ROK Army personnel. Captain Kelly received a letter of commendation from a battle group commander, 1st Cavalry Division for demonstrated valor in the evacuation of a patient under the most adverse conditions, His detachment maintained the highest availability rate on HU-1A and H-13 aircraft in USARPAC. The morale of his personnel is outstanding. He is a very forceful individual who knows aviation and army procedures well, is discreet, tactful, and honest. He is an outstanding officer in every respect. Socially his presence is solicited. In every respect this officer is a credit to the Corps and the Service. He definitely will do an outstanding job wherever he is assigned. He should be selected for Command and General Staff School as soon as possible so that he can function in staff positions of higher headquarters. He is an excellent speaker, presents his material logically, and makes a fine impression on senior officers."
October 1961	October 1962	Operations officer, Chief Flight Section, and maintenance officer, Army Medical Aviation Branch, Plans and Operations Division	Brooke Army Medical Center	Fort Sam Houston, Texas	At time, the Medical Field Service School reported to Brooke Army Medical Center as a subordinate unit, as did all of the field medical units assigned to Fort Sam Houston. The flight section itself had four aircraft assigned to it—two OH-13s and two UH-1s—and the 82nd Medical Detachment (Helicopter Ambulance) was also stationed at Fort Sam Houston, with five aircraft of its own. Additionally, for part of Kelly's tour, the 317th Medical Company (Air Ambulance), an Army Reserve unit, was on active duty orders with eight borrowed utility and four borrowed observation aircraft before being released in mid-1962. Finally, at any given time there were 25 aviators on ground duty or in a student status within the command who were required to meet minimum flying hour requirements for readiness purposes. During Kelly's period in the section, aviators under BAMC's supervision flew in excess of 4,000 flying hours, from flying training missions, to transporting patients, to transporting new UH-1s from the Bell Helicopter factory in Fort Worth, Texas to various Army installations. The Army Medical Aviation Branch itself was authorized five officers and sixteen enlisted.
October 1962	December 1963	Commander	54th Medical Detachment (Helicopter Ambulance), 428th Medical Battalion	Fort Benning, Georgia	The 54th was reactivated on 26 October 1962 under Kelly's command, having been inactivated in Korea on 15 August 1962. Part of the buildup in support of a potential invasion of Cuba during the Cuban Missile Crisis, the 54th had no aircraft and had to dispatch crews to Sharpe Army Aviation Depot in Stockton, California to obtain five H-19Cs. As only one of the unit's pilots—a former National Guardsman—was qualified to fly the H-19C, he was designated as an Instructor Pilot to qualify the other aviators in the unit to fly the aircraft, all of which were old and had seen extensive duty in MAAG Formosa and MAAG Korea. After qualifying in the aircraft, the crews loaded up as many spare parts as they could carry and returned to Fort Benning. In February 1963 the detachment returned to California to support exercises at Fort Hunter Liggett for four months. During the trip to California, the aircraft Kelly was piloting sustained an in-flight failure of the aircraft because equipment had not been "safetied" properly. As a result, the H-19 crashed and the damage was estimated as "in excess of cost" of the 12 year old aircraft. In his diary entry for the day, Kelly simply wrote "a routine day."
11 January 1964	1 July 1964	Commander	57th Medical Detachment (Helicopter Ambulance)	Saigon and Soc Trang, South Vietnam	Ending with his death on 1 July 1964

== The 57th Medical Detachment (Helicopter Ambulance) in Vietnam ==
Kelly is often erroneously credited with being the first commander of the 57th Medical Detachment (Helicopter Ambulance) in South Vietnam, or of selecting the callsign "Dustoff" for the 57th. Neither is true.

The 57th Medical Detachment was activated at Fort Sam Houston on 6 April 1953. The detachment departed Fort Sam Houston on a permanent Change of station move on 5 November 1957, arriving at Fort George G. Meade, Maryland on 20 November 1957. The detachment, under the command of Captain John P. Temperilli Jr., MSC, was alerted for overseas movement on 15 February 1962 and departed the Continental United States aboard the USS Croatan on 8 March 1962 and arrived in South Vietnam on 26 April 1962, bringing with it the first five UH-1s to deploy to Vietnam. Upon arrival the detachment, among the very first units of the Army Medical Department to arrive in Vietnam, was placed under the command and control of the 8th Field Hospital, whose commander was also assigned the role of Surgeon, United States Army Support Command, Vietnam.

Temperelli was replaced on 26 February 1963 by Major Lloyd E. Spencer. It was Spencer who would select the callsign "Dustoff" for the 57th.

During its first year in country, the 57th worked without a tactical call sign, simply using "Army" and the tail number of the aircraft. For example, if a pilot were flying a helicopter with the serial number 62-12345, his call sign would be "Army 12345". The 57th communicated internally on any vacant frequency it could find. Major Spencer decided that this improvised system needed to be replaced by something more formal. He visited the Navy Support Activity, Saigon, which controlled all the call signs in South Vietnam. He received a Signal Operations Instructions book that listed all the unused call signs. Most, like "Bandit", were more suitable for assault units than for medical evacuation units. But one entry, "Dust Off", epitomized the 57th's medical evacuation missions. Since the countryside then was dry and dusty, helicopter pickups in the fields often blew dust, dirt, blankets, and shelter halves all over the men on the ground. By adopting "Dust Off", Spencer found for Army aeromedical evacuation in Vietnam a name that lasted the rest of the war.

Although unit callsigns at the time were rotated periodically to preserve operations security, it was determined that having a fixed callsign for medical evacuation—and a fixed frequency—would be more advantageous for medical evacuation operations, and so the 57th's callsign was not changed as it normally would have been at the end of the period for the Signal Operations Instructions.

One of the earliest arriving Army Medical Department units in theater, the 57th was also the longest serving, leaving theater on 9 March 1973, less than three weeks before the final exit of U.S. troops, for its new home at Fort Bragg, North Carolina, where it would remain until it was inactivated in the mid-2000s. Its service qualified it for 17 of the 18 campaigns of the Vietnam Service Medal, and the detachment was awarded the Presidential Unit Citation, five Meritorious Unit Citations, and the Gallantry Cross with Palm.

== Command of the 57th Medical Detachment (Helicopter Ambulance) ==
Kelly logged his first flight hours in Vietnam on 6 January 1964 and assumed command of the 57th Medical Detachment (Helicopter Ambulance) at Tan Son Nhut Air Base on 11 January 1964.

Although the number of Vietnamese casualties rose in 1963, the South Vietnamese military refused to set up its own aeromedical evacuation unit. The VNAF response to requests for medical evacuation depended on aircraft availability, the security of the landing zone, and the mood and temperament of the VNAF pilots. If the South Vietnamese had no on-duty or standby aircraft ready to fly a medical evacuation mission, they passed the request on to the 57th. Even when they accepted the mission themselves, their response usually suffered from a lack of leadership and poor organization. Since South Vietnamese air mission commanders rarely flew with their flights, the persons responsible for deciding whether to abort a mission often lacked the requisite experience. As a MACV summary said: "Usually the decision was made to abort, and the air mission commander could do nothing about it. When an aggressive pilot was in the lead ship, the aircraft came through despite the firing. American advisers reported that on two occasions only the first one or two helicopters landed; the rest hovered out of reach of the wounded who needed to get aboard."

An example of the poor quality of VNAF medical evacuation occurred in late October 1963, when the ARVN 2d Battalion, 14th Regiment, conducted Operation LONG HUU II near O Lac in the Delta. At dawn the battalion began its advance. Shortly after they moved out, the Viet Cong ambushed them, opening fire from three sides with automatic weapons and 81 -mm. mortars. At 0700 casualty reports started coming into the battalion command post. The battalion commander sent his first casualty report to the regimental headquarters at 0800: one ARVN soldier dead and twelve wounded, with more casualties in the paddies. He then requested medical evacuation helicopters. By 0845 the casualty count had risen to seventeen lightly wounded, fourteen seriously wounded, and four dead. He sent out another urgent call for helicopters. The battalion executive officer and the American adviser prepared two landing zones, one marked by green smoke for the seriously wounded and a second by yellow smoke for the less seriously wounded. Not until 1215 did three VNAF H-34's arrive over O Lac to carry out the wounded and dead. During the delay the ARVN battalion stayed in place to protect their casualties rather than pursue the retreating enemy. The American adviser wrote later: "It is common that, when casualties are sustained, the advance halts while awaiting evacuation. Either the reaction time for helicopter evacuation must be improved, or some plan must be made for troops in the battalion rear to provide security for the evacuation and care of casualties."

The ARVN medical services also proved inadequate to handle the large numbers of casualties. In the Delta, ARVN patients were usually taken to the Vietnamese Provincial Hospital at Can Tho. As the main treatment center for the Delta, it often had a backlog of patients. At night only one doctor was on duty, for the ARVN medical service lacked physicians. If Dustoff flew in many casualties, that doctor normally treated as many as he could; but he rarely called in any of his fellow doctors to help. In return they would not call him on his night off. Many times at night Dustoff pilots would have to make several flights into Can Tho. On return flights the pilots often found loads of injured ARVN soldiers lying on the landing pad where they had been left some hours earlier. After several such flights few pilots could sustain any enthusiasm for night missions.

Another problem was that the ARVN officers sometimes bowed to the sentiments of their soldiers, many of whom believed that the soul lingers between this world and the next if the body is not properly buried. They insisted that Dustoff ships fly out dead bodies, especially if there were no seriously wounded waiting for treatment. Once, after landing at a pickup site north of Saigon, a Dustoff crew saw many ARVN wounded lying on the ground. But the other ARVN soldiers brought bodies to the helicopter to be evacuated first. As the soldiers loaded the dead in one side of the ship, a Dustoff medical corpsman pulled the bodies out the other side. The pilot stepped out of the helicopter to explain in halting French to the ARVN commander that his orders were to carry out only the wounded. But an ARVN soldier manning a .50-caliber machine gun on a nearby armored personnel carrier suddenly pointed his weapon at the Huey. This convinced the Dustoff crew to fly out the bodies. They carried out one load but did not return for another.

Early in 1964 the growing burden of aeromedical evacuation fell on the 57th's third group of new pilots, crews, and maintenance personnel. The helicopters were still the 1963 UH-1B models, but most of the new pilots were fresh from flight school. Kelly was described as "a gruff, stubborn, dedicated soldier who let few obstacles prevent him from finishing a task." Within six months he set an example of courage and hard work that Dustoff pilots emulated for the rest of the war, and into the 21st Century.

Kelly quickly took advantage of the 57th's belated move to the fighting in the south. On 1 March 1964 the U.S. Army Support Group, Vietnam ordered the aircraft at Pleiku and Qui Nhon to move to the Delta. Two helicopters and five pilots, now called Detachment A, 57th Medical Detachment (Helicopter Ambulance), Provisional, flew to the U.S. base at Soc Trang. Once a fighter base for both the French and the Japanese, Soc Trang was a compound roughly 1,000 by 3,000 feet, surrounded by rice paddies.

Unit statistics soon proved the wisdom of the move south: the number of Vietnamese evacuees climbed from 193 in February to 416 in March. Detachment A continued its coverage of combat in the Delta until October 1964, when the 82nd Medical Detachment (Helicopter Ambulance) from the States took over that area. Major Kelly, who had taken command of the 57th on 11 January, moved south with Detachment A, preferring the field and flying to ground duty in Saigon.

Detachment An in Soc Trang lived in crude "Southeast Asia" huts with sandbags and bunkers for protection against enemy mortar and ground attack. The rest of the 57th in Saigon struggled along with air conditioning, private baths, a mess hall, and a bar in their living quarters. In spite of the contrast, most pilots preferred Soc Trang. It was there that Major Kelly and his pilots forged the Dustoff tradition of valorous and dedicated service.

Kelly and his teams also benefited from two years of growing American involvement in Vietnam. By the spring of 1964 the United States had 16,000 military personnel in South Vietnam (3,700 officers and 12,300 enlisted men). The Army, which accounted for 10,100 of these, had increased its aircraft in South Vietnam from 40 in December 1961 to 370 in December 1963. For the first time since its arrival two years ago the 57th was receiving enough Dustoff requests to keep all its pilots busy.

Kelly faced one big problem when he arrived: the helicopters that the 57th had received the year before were showing signs of age and use, and Brigadier General Joseph Stilwell Jr., the Support Group commander, could find no new aircraft for the detachment. Average flight time on the old UH-1Bs was 800 hours. But this did not deter the new pilots from each flying more than 100 hours a month in medical evacuations. Some of them stopped logging their flight time at 140 hours, so that the flight surgeon would not ground them for exceeding the monthly ceiling.

The new team continued and even stepped-up night operations. In April 1964, the detachment flew 110 hours at night while evacuating ninety-nine patients. To aid their night missions in the Delta the pilots made a few special plotting flights, during which they sketched charts of the possible landing zones, outlined any readily identifiable terrain features, and noted whether radio navigational aid could be received. During one such flight Major Kelly and his copilot heard on their radio that a VNAF T-28, a fixed-wing plane, had gone down. After joining the search, Kelly soon located the plane. While he and his crew circled the area trying to decide how to approach the landing zone, the Viet Cong below opened fire on the helicopter. One round passed up through the open cargo door and slammed into the ceiling. Unfazed, Kelly shot a landing to the T-28, taking fire from all sides. Once down, he, his crew chief, and his medic jumped out and sprayed submachine gun fire at the Viet Cong while helping the VNAF pilot destroy his radios and pull the M60 machine guns from his plane. Kelly left the area without further damage and returned the VNAF pilot to his unit. Kelly and his Dustoff crew flew more than 500 miles that day.

On 2 April one of the Detachment A crews flying to Saigon from Soc Trang received a radio call that a village northwest of them had been overrun. Flying up to the area where the Mekong River flows into South Vietnam from Cambodia, they landed at the village of Cai Cai, where during the night Viet Cong had killed or wounded all the people. Soldiers lay at their fighting positions where they had fallen, women and children where they had been shot. The Dustoff teams worked the rest of the day flying out the dead and wounded, putting two or three children on each litter.

One night that spring Detachment A pilots Capt. Patrick Henry Brady] and 2d Lt. Ernest J. Sylvester were on duty when a call came in that an A-1E Skyraider, a fixed-wing plane, had gone down near the town of Rach Gia. Flying west to the site, they radioed the Air Force radar controller, who guided them to the landing zone and warned them of Viet Cong antiaircraft guns. As the Dustoff ship drew near the landing zone, which was plainly marked by the burning A-1E, the pilot of another nearby A-1E radioed that he had already knocked out the Viet Cong machine guns. But when Brady and Sylvester approached the zone the Viet Cong opened fire. Bullets crashed into the cockpit and the pilots lost control of the aircraft. Neither was seriously wounded and they managed to regain control and hurry out of the area. Viet Cong fire then brought down the second A-1E. A third arrived shortly and finally suppressed the enemy fire, allowing a second Dustoff ship from Soc Trang to land in the zone. The crew chief and medical corpsman found what they guessed was the dead pilot of the downed aircraft, then found the pilot of the second, who had bailed out, and flew him back to Soc Trang.

A short time later Brady accompanied an ARVN combat assault mission near Phan Thiet, northeast of Saigon. While Brady's Dustoff ship circled out of range of enemy ground fire, the transport helicopters landed and the troops moved out into a wooded area heavily defended by the Viet Cong. The ARVN soldiers immediately suffered several casualties and called for Dustoff. Brady's aircraft took hits going into and leaving the landing zone, but he managed to fly out the wounded. In Phan Thiet, while he was assessing the damage to his aircraft, an American adviser asked him if he would take ammunition back to the embattled ARVN unit when he returned for the next load of wounded. After discussing the propriety of carrying ammunition in an aircraft marked with red crosses, Brady and his pilots decided to consider the ammunition as "preventive medicine" and fly it into the LZ for the ARVN troops. Back at the landing zone Brady found that Viet Cong fire had downed an L-19 observation plane. Brady ran to the crash site, but both the American pilot and the observer had been killed. The medical corpsman and crew chief pulled the bodies from the wreckage and loaded them on the helicopter. Brady left the ammunition and flew out with the dead.

By the time the helicopter had finished its mission and returned to Tan Son Nhut, most of the 57th were waiting. News of an American death traveled quickly in those early days of the war. Later, reflecting on the incident, Kelly praised his pilots for bringing the bodies back even though the 57th's mission statement said nothing about moving the dead. But he voiced renewed doubts about the ferrying of ammunition.

Brady later explained what actually happened behind the scenes. Upon landing, Brady was met by Kelly and called aside. Expecting to be sternly counseled, Brady was surprised when Kelly simply asked why he had carried in ammunition and carried out the dead. Brady replied that the ammunition was "preventive medicine" and that the dead "were angels", and he couldn't refuse them. Kelly simply walked back to the group involved in that day's missions and told them that it was the type of mission he wanted the 57th to be flying. Brady realized the significance of Kelly's statement, as Kelly would be responsible for any fallout from Brady's actions.

In fact, the Dustoff mission was again under attack. When Support Command began to pressure the 57th to place removable red crosses on the aircraft and begin accepting general purpose missions, Kelly stepped up unit operations. Knowing that removable red crosses had already been placed on transport and assault helicopters in the north, Kelly told his men that the 57th must prove its worth-and by implication the value of dedicated medical helicopters-beyond any shadow of doubt.

While before the 57th had flown missions only in response to a request, it now began to seek missions. Kelly himself flew almost every night. As dusk came, he and his crew would depart Soc Trang and head southwest for the marshes and Bac Lieu, home of a team from the 73d Aviation Company and detachments from two signal units, then further south to Ca Mau, an old haunt of the Viet Minh, whom the French had never been able to dislodge from its forested swamps. Next, they would fly south almost to the tip of Ca Mau Peninsula, then at Nam Can reverse their course toward the Seven Canals area. After a check for casualties there at Vi Thanh, they turned northwest up to Rach Gia on the Gulf of Siam, then on to the Seven Mountains region on the Cambodian border. From there they came back to Can Tho, the home of fourteen small American units, then up to Vinh Long on the Mekong River, home of the 114th Aviation Company (Airmobile Light). Finally, they flew due east to Truc Giang, south to the few American advisers at Phu Vinh, then home to Soc Trang. The entire circuit was 720 kilometers.

If any of the stops had patients to be evacuated, Kelly's crew loaded them on the aircraft and continued on course, unless a patient's condition warranted returning immediately to Soc Trang. After delivering the patients, they would sometimes resume the circuit. Many nights they carried ten to fifteen patients who otherwise would have had to wait until daylight to receive the care they needed. In March, this flying from outpost to outpost, known as "scarfing", resulted in seventy-four hours of night flying that evacuated nearly one-fourth of that month's 448 evacuees. The stratagem worked; General Stilwell dropped the idea of having the 57th use removable red crosses.

Although most of Dustoff's work in the Delta was over flat, marshy land, Detachment A sometimes had to work the difficult mountainous areas near the Cambodian border. Late on the afternoon of 11 April Kelly received a mission request to evacuate two wounded ARVN soldiers from Phnom Kto Mountain of the Seven Mountains of An Giang Province. When he arrived he found that the only landing zone near the ground troops was a small area surrounded by high trees below some higher ground held by the Viet Cong. Despite the updrafts common to mountain flying, the mists, and the approaching darkness, Kelly shot an approach to the area. The enemy opened fire and kept firing until Kelly's ship dropped below the treetops into the landing zone. Kelly could set the aircraft down on only one skid; the slope was too steep. Since only one of the wounded was at the landing zone, Kelly and his crew had to balance the ship precariously while waiting for the ARVN troops to carry the other casualty up the mountain. With both patients finally on board, Kelly took off and again flew through enemy fire. The medical corpsman promptly began working on the Vietnamese, one of whom had been wounded in five places. Both casualties survived.

When Kelly flew such a mission he rarely let bad weather darkness, or the enemy stop him from completing it. He fought his way to the casualties and brought them out. On one mission the enemy forced him away from the landing zone before he could place the patients on board. An hour later he tried to land exactly the same way, through enemy fire, and this time he managed to load the patients safely. The Viet Cong showed their indifference to the red crosses on the aircraft by trying to destroy it with small arms, automatic weapons, and mortars, even while the medical corpsman and crew chief loaded the patients. One round hit the main fuel drain valve and JP-4 fuel started spewing. Kelly elected to fly out anyway, practicing what he had preached since he arrived in Vietnam by putting the patients above all else and hurrying them off the battlefield. He radioed the Soc Trang tower that his ship was leaking fuel and did not have much left, and that he wanted priority on landing. The tower operator answered that Kelly had priority and asked whether he needed anything else. Kelly said, "Yes, bring me some ice cream." just after he landed on the runway the engine quit, fuel tanks empty. Crash trucks surrounded the helicopter. The base commander drove up, walked over to Kelly, and handed him a quart of ice cream.

Apart from the Viet Cong, the 57th's greatest problem at that time was a lack of pilots. After Kelly reached Vietnam he succeeded in having the other nine Medical Service Corps pilots who followed him assigned to the 57th. He needed more, but the Surgeon General's Aviation Branch seemed to have little understanding of the rigors of Dustoff flying. In the spring of 1964 the Aviation Branch tried to have new Medical Service Corps pilots assigned to nonmedical helicopter units in Vietnam, assuming that they would benefit more from combat training than from Dustoff flying.

On 15 June 1964, Kelly gave his response:

"As for combat experience, the pilots in this unit are getting as much or more combat-support flying experience than any unit over here. You must understand that everybody wants to get into the Aeromedical Evacuation business. To send pilots to U.T.T. [the Utility Tactical Transport Helicopter Company, a nonmedical unit] or anywhere else is playing right into their hands. I fully realize that I do not know much about the big program, but our job is evacuation of casualties from the battlefield. This we are doing day and night, without escort aircraft, and with only one ship for each mission. Since I have been here we have evacuated 1800 casualties and in the last three months we have flown 242.7 hours at night. No other unit can match this. The other [nonmedical] units fly in groups, rarely at night, and always heavily armed."

He continued:

"If you want the MSC Pilots to gain experience that will be worthwhile, send them to this unit. It is a Medical Unit and I don't want to see combat arms officers in this unit. I will not mention this again. However, for the good of the Medical Service Corps Pilots and the future of medical aviation I urge you to do all that you can to keep this unit full of MSC Pilots."

In other words, Kelly thought that his unit had a unique job to do and that the only effective training for it could be found in the cockpit of a Dustoff helicopter.

Perhaps presciently, Kelly closed his letter as follows:

"Don't go to the trouble of answering this letter for I know that you are very busy. Anyhow, everything has been said. I will do my best, and please remember 'Army Medical Evacuation FIRST'."

With more and more fighting occurring in the Delta and around Saigon, the 57th could not always honor every evacuation request. U.S. Army helicopter assault companies were forced to keep some of their aircraft on evacuation standby, but without a medical corpsman or medical equipment. Because of the shortage of Army aviators and the priority of armed combat support, the Medical Service Corps did not have enough pilots to staff another Dustoff unit in Vietnam. Most Army aeromedical evacuation units elsewhere already worked with less than their permitted number of pilots. Although Army aviation in Vietnam had grown considerably since 1961, by the summer of 1964 its resources fell short of what it needed to perform its missions, especially medical evacuation.

Army commanders, however, seldom have all the men and material they can use, and Major Kelly knew that he had to do his best with what he had.

Kelly had begun to realize that, although he preferred flying and being in the field to Saigon, he could better influence things by returning to Tan Son Nhut. After repeated requests from Brady, Kelly told him that he would relinquish command of Detachment A of the 57th at Soc Trang to Brady on 1 July and return to Saigon—although he then later told Brady he was extending his stay in the Delta for at least another month.

== 1 July 1964 ==
Kelly was killed in action on 1 July 1964, when, after being warned out of a "hot" landing zone, he replied, "When I have your wounded." A bullet entered through an open cargo door and pierced his heart. Major Kelly became the 149th American to die in Vietnam.

== Immediate aftermath ==
The following day, an officer tossed the bullet on his desk in front of Kelly's successor, Captain Patrick Henry Brady, and asked if they were going to stop flying so aggressively. Brady picked up the bullet and replied, "we are going to keep flying exactly the way Kelly taught us to fly, without hesitation, anytime, anywhere."

Kelly was returned to Sylvania on 14 July 1964 and was interred at the Screven County Memorial Cemetery, Sylvania, Georgia on 15 July 1964 following a memorial service at the Sylvania First Baptist Church. The Army provided an honor guard, a military escort, and a chaplain, and "full military honors" were provided at the graveside. Flags in the city were flown at half staff on the 14th and the 15th, draped with a black mourning stripe until after the completion of the funeral. All city offices in Sylvania were closed on the 14th and 15th, although no official proclamation of mourning was issued. As Sylvania's mayor, Ed Overstreet said, "We made no proclamation of mourning. We in Sylvania all knew Major Kelly personally and we want only to enter his funeral personally. We will let the military handle the official part."

Several young war correspondents for major American wire services, news magazines, and newspapers had been prowling the Delta in 1964 looking for stories. One of them, future Pulitzer Prize winning journalist Peter Arnett had made friends with Kelly and his crews in Soc Trang, figuring that Dustoff would make a good story for his employer, the Associated Press. Instead, he ended up writing what became, in essence, Kelly's obituary, which was carried nationally on the day Kelly was buried, many with a photo of Kelly at the controls of his Dustoff aircraft. Another, unnamed author wrote a story for Time magazine which ran nationally on 10 July.

== Long-term legacy ==
The official history of the Army Medical Service Corps perhaps sums up Kelly's contributions to army aeromedical evacuation best, when it stated that:

"Kelly became a legend, revered for his aggressive leadership and fearlessness in evacuating casualties. Ironically, his loss ensured that the Army's aeromedical operations would use his mold, one characterized by unarmed single ships operated without escort aircraft by aviators who, like Kelly, were experienced in night flying. In fact, the flying skills of Dustoff crews were such that some general aviation pilots believed there was a special school to teach their flying techniques. Kelly was posthumously awarded the Distinguished Service Cross, and in 1967 General Heaton dedicated the Kelly Heliport at Fort Sam Houston, Texas."

== Awards, decorations and honors ==
=== Distinguished Service Cross ===
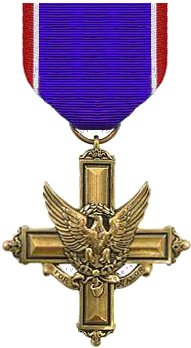

Citation:

The President of the United States of America, authorized by Act of Congress, July 9, 1918 (amended by act of July 25, 1963), takes pride in presenting the Distinguished Service Cross (Posthumously) to Major (Medical Corps) Charles L. Kelly (ASN: 0-70399), United States Army, for extraordinary heroism in connection with military operations involving conflict with an armed hostile force in the Republic of Vietnam, while serving as an Aircraft Commander of the 57th Medical Detachment, on 1 July 1964. Major Kelly demonstrated exceptional courage, strong determination, and complete disregard for his own personal safety while participating in an aerial medical mission to evacuate wounded soldiers from an area under heavy attack by hostile forces. With unique professional skill and full knowledge of the intense ground fire and the immediate proximity of the enemy, he landed the unarmed helicopter ambulance close to the wounded men in the exposed area. Although the ground advisor warned him of the grave danger and recommended departure, Major Kelly refused to leave without the wounded soldiers and succeeded in loading them aboard the helicopter moments before he was mortally wounded by hostile gun fire. Major Kelly's extraordinary heroic actions, valiant efforts, and deep concern for his fellow man are in the highest traditions of the United States Army and reflect great credit upon himself and the United States Army Medical Service, and the armed forces of his country.

=== Silver Star ===
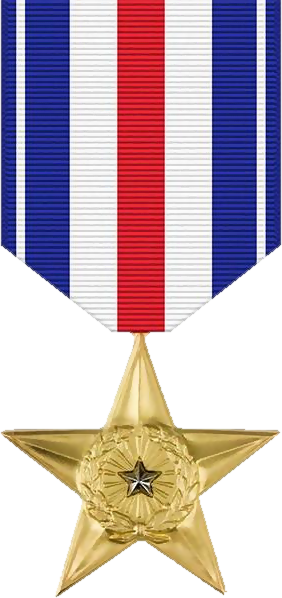

Citation:

The President of the United States of America, authorized by Act of Congress July 9, 1918 (amended by an act of July 25, 1963), takes pride in presenting the Silver Star (Posthumously) to Major (Medical Corps) Charles L. Kelly (ASN: 0-70399), United States Army, for gallantry in action in connection with military operations involving conflict with an armed hostile force in the Republic of Vietnam, while serving as an Aircraft Commander of the 57th Medical Detachment, on 19 June 1964. Major Kelly displayed professional skill, fortitude, and determination while participating in an aerial medical mission to evacuate several critically wounded Vietnamese troops. Although his first attempt to land the helicopter ambulance was prevented by intense enemy action, he returned within the hour and succeeded in maneuvering the aircraft into the area. As the small arms, automatic weapons fire, and mortar rounds fell near the aircraft, he exposed himself to the danger while assisting the wounded men on board the helicopter ambulance. When a round of ammunition hit the main fuel drain valve of the aircraft during the evacuation operations, he quickly assessed the situation and, through his decision that the patients on board be flown out immediately for medical treatment, the helicopter landed at a medical facility with a few minutes of fuel to spare. Through his courageous and unselfish actions the wounded men received timely medical aid and many lives were saved. Major Kelly's conspicuous gallantry is in the highest traditions of the United States Army and reflects great credit upon himself and the military service.

=== Distinguished Flying Cross ===
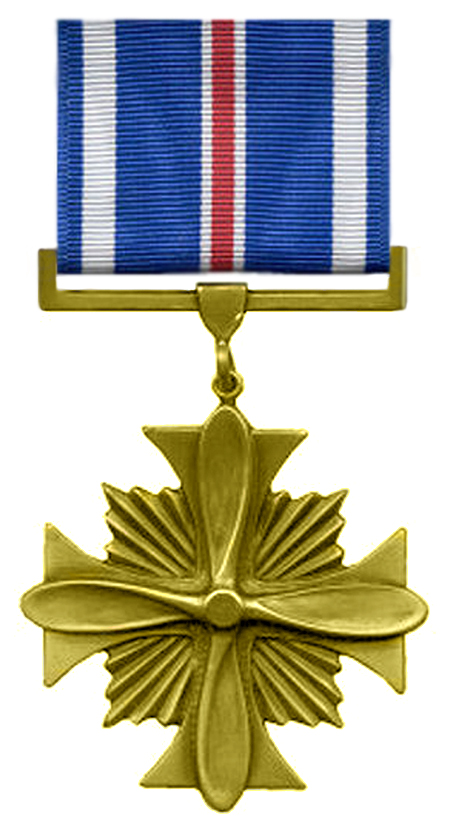

Citation

The President of the United States of America, authorized by Act of Congress, July 2, 1926, takes pride in presenting the Distinguished Flying Cross (Posthumously) to Major (Medical Corps) Charles L. Kelly (ASN: 0-70399), United States Army, for heroism while participating in aerial flight. Major Kelly distinguished himself by heroism while participating in aerial flight in action against a hostile force on 2 April 1964 in the Republic of Vietnam. Major Kelly was the aircraft commander of a helicopter ambulance on a combat support mission. He received information that an American helicopter had been hit by ground fire and was forced to land in hostile territory. He immediately flew to the area arriving just as the helicopter touched down. Disregarding his own personal safety, with full knowledge that the enemy forces had begun to attack the crew of the downed aircraft, Major Kelly landed in the middle of the enemy ground forces. Heavy fire was received during the approach and while on the ground, but Major Kelly never wavered in his efforts and determination to save the downed crew from possible death and almost certain capture. Major Kelly's efforts resulted in the downed aircraft being flown to safety. Major Kelly's actions were in keeping with the highest traditions of the military service and reflect great credit upon himself and the United States Army.

=== Distinguished Flying Cross (First Oak Leaf Cluster) ===
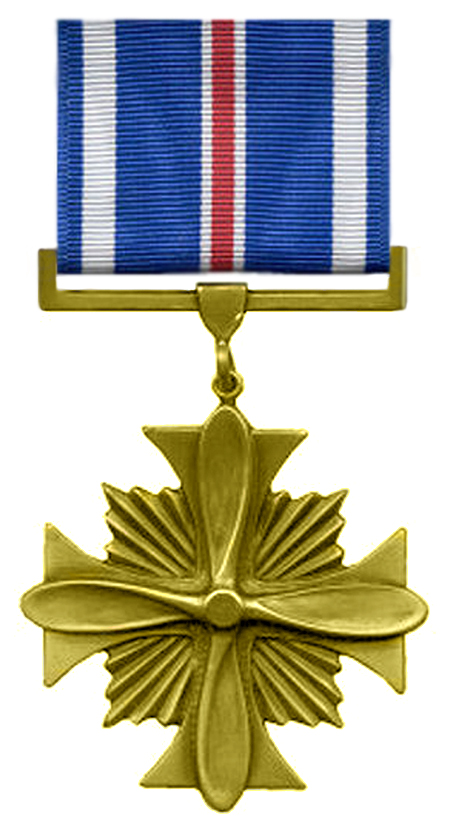

Citation

The President of the United States of America, authorized by Act of Congress, July 2, 1926, takes pride in presenting a Bronze Oak Leaf Cluster in lieu of a Second Award of the Distinguished Flying Cross (Posthumously) to Major (Medical Corps) Charles L. Kelly (ASN: 0-70399), United States Army, for heroism while participating in aerial flight in action against a hostile force on 9 April 1964 in the Republic of Vietnam. Major Kelly was the aircraft commander of a helicopter ambulance on a combat support mission. Upon receiving information of a crashed Republic of Vietnam Air Force T-28, Major Kelly immediately flew to the crash site and began a low aerial search for the downed aircraft. At this time a United States Army helicopter in the immediate area declared an emergency and was forced down into an area surrounded by Viet Cong forces. Disregarding his own personal safety, Major Kelly was determined to save the crew of the downed aircraft. Upon making his approach, Major Kelly received heavy fire from all sides, with one round passing through the cock-pit. Despite the dangers involved, Major Kelly continued into the area and landed near the downed aircraft. Upon landing, he and his aircraft crew became engaged in a heavy fire fight with the enemy forces in the vicinity. It became necessary to destroy the downed helicopter to prevent its utilization by the enemy. The rescued crew was then flown out of the area under heavy fire to safety. Due to Major Kelly's efforts, members of the aircraft crew were saved from possible death or capture. Major Kelly's actions were in keeping with the highest traditions of the military service and reflect great credit upon himself and the United States Army.

=== Distinguished Flying Cross (Second Oak Leaf Cluster) ===
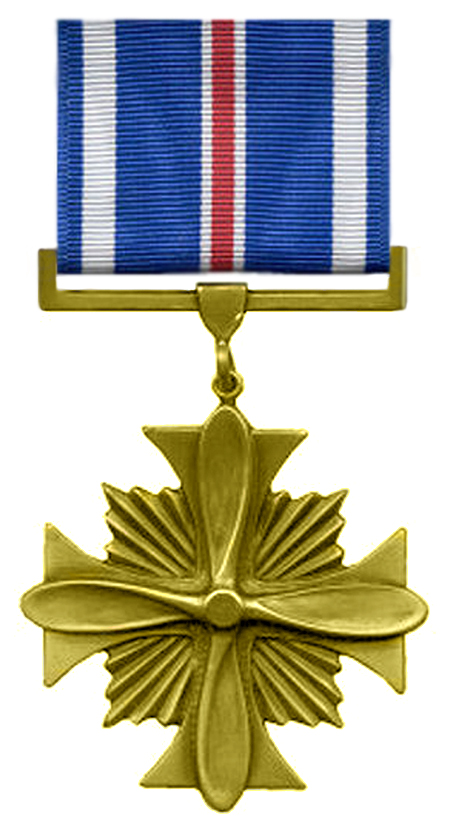

Citation

The President of the United States of America, authorized by Act of Congress, July 2, 1926, takes pleasure in presenting a Second Bronze Oak Leaf Cluster in lieu of a Third Award of the Distinguished Flying Cross to Major (Medical Corps) Charles L. Kelly (ASN: 0-70399), United States Army, for heroism while participating in aerial flight. Major Kelly distinguished himself by heroic action on 11 April 1964, in the Republic of Vietnam. On this date, Major Kelly was serving as the pilot of a UH-1B medical helicopter involved in the evacuation of two wounded Vietnamese soldiers who were located on Co To Mountain in An Giang Province. When he arrived at the combat area, he was informed that the only place to land was on the mountain in an area approximately 25 meters by 25 meters, surrounded by trees, and overlooked by terrain known to be infested by communist Viet Cong. Darkness was falling, the weather was misting, and gusting winds prevailed. Despite these extreme hazards, and in total disregard of his own personal safety, Major Kelly brought his aircraft into the landing zone through intense hostile fire. The incline of the mountain prevented a solid landing and Major Kelly had to "hold the stick" of his aircraft to prevent its falling off the mountain. Since one of the wounded soldiers had not been carried up the mountain, Major Kelly with remarkable skill and dogged determination held his aircraft on the mountain side for twenty minutes, refusing to leave until the wounded man was aboard. This was done in spite of the fact that total darkness would soon be upon him and would make take-off from the tiny landing zone even more dangerous. His only thoughts were for the welfare of the wounded men whom he knew would surely die without prompt medical attention. With the wounded finally aboard he skillfully took off, again running a gauntlet of automatic weapons fire. The two soldiers, one of whom had been wounded five times, were saved by the prompt medical attention they received. Major Kelly's dauntless courage, professional skill, and devotion to his comrades in arms have added to the highest traditions of the United States Army and reflect great credit upon himself and the military service.

=== Commendations and awards ===
Kelly was awarded the following:

Badge	Combat Medical Badge		
Badge	Combat Infantryman Badge		
Badge	U.S. Army Senior Aviator Badge		
1st Row	Distinguished Service Cross (posthumous)		
2nd Row	Silver Star	Distinguished Flying Cross with 2 Oak leaf clusters	Bronze Star Medal
3rd Row	Purple Heart with 1 Oak leaf cluster (posthumous)	Air Medal with 18 Oak leaf clusters (Award numeral 19)	Army Commendation Medal
4th Row	Army Good Conduct Medal	American Defense Service Medal	American Campaign Medal
5th Row	European-African-Middle Eastern Campaign Medal with 2 Campaign stars	World War II Victory Medal	Army of Occupation Medal with Germany Clasp
6th Row	National Defense Service Medal with 1 Service star	Armed Forces Expeditionary Medal	National Order of Vietnam; Fifth Class
7th Row	Vietnam Distinguished Service Order; First Class	Cross of Gallantry with Palm	Republic of Vietnam Campaign Medal with 1960– device
Badge	Parachutist Badge		
Unit awards	Meritorious Unit Citation (Army)		Gallantry Cross with Palm Unit Citation

Kelly's awards are shown in the current Army configuration, with the Purple Heart immediately below the Bronze Star Medal instead of immediately below the Army Commendation Medal and with Bronze Numerals instead of Oak Leaf Clusters on the Air Medal, as would have been customary at the time of his death.

== Memorialization ==
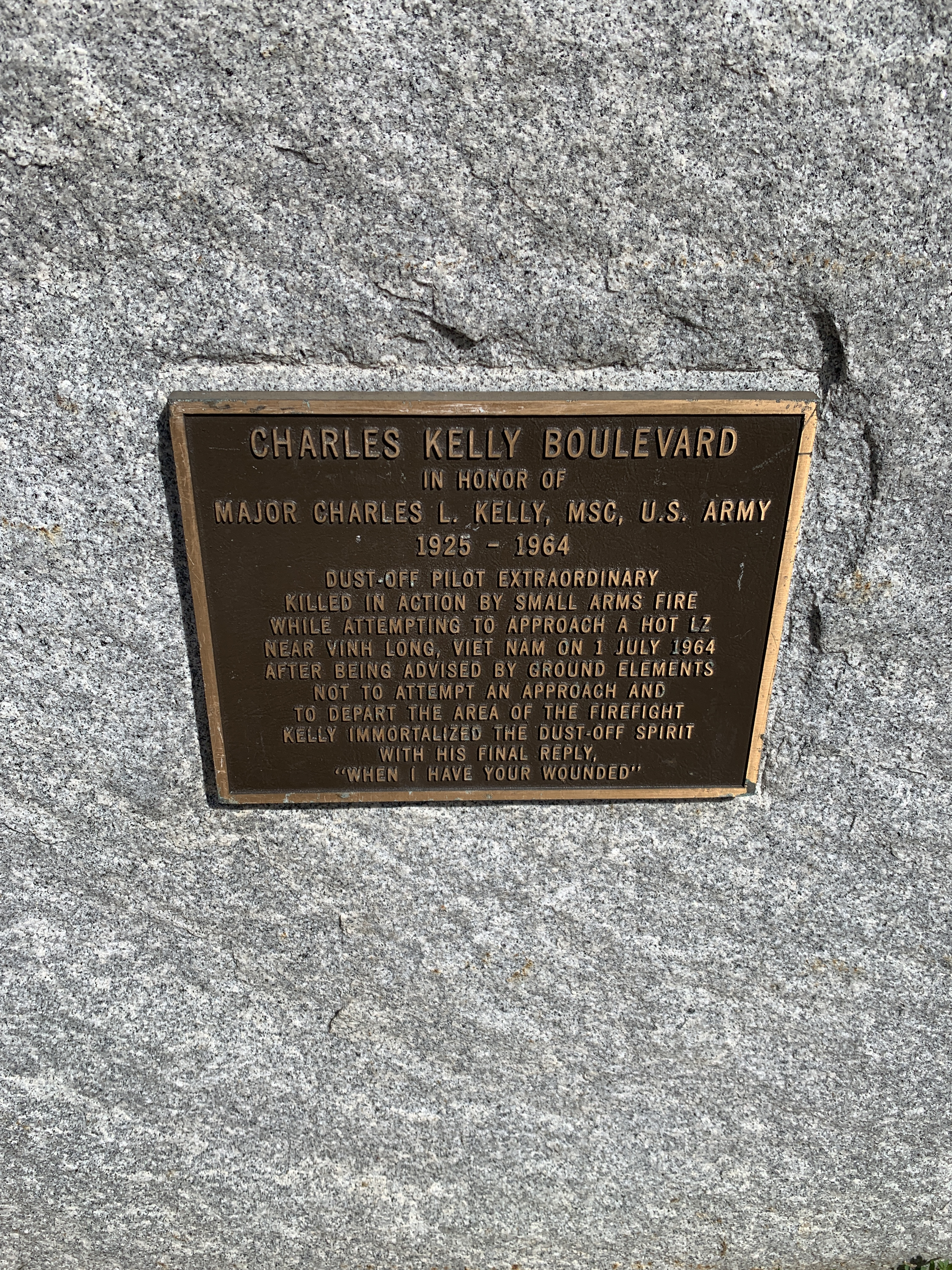
Photo of the Charles Kelly Boulevard commemorative marker at the Fitzsimons Building of the Anschutz Medical Campus.

- Kelly's name is listed on Panel 1E, Row 57 on the Vietnam Veterans Memorial in Washington, D.C.
- The stadium at the Screven County High School in Sylvania, Georgia was named after Kelly in 1965, and rededicated to him on 1 July 2014, the 50th anniversary of his death.
- Fort Sam Houston's Kelly Army Heliport (now the Kelly Army Reserve Center) was dedicated in Kelly's honor on 7 April 1967
- Charles Kelly Boulevard on Fitzsimmons Army Medical Center was named in Kelly's honor in June 1991. The Medical Center closed in 1996, and the remaining section of Kelly Boulevard is now named E. 17th Place; the remainder is a pedestrian walkway. A bronze marker still remains.
- Fort Rucker's Kelly Hall is named in his honor.
- Kelly was inducted into the Army Aviation Association of America's Hall of Fame in 1975.
- Kelly was the first inductee into the Dustoff Association Hall of Fame, on 17 February 2001.
- The Dustoff Association annually presents awards to the Aviator, Crew Chief, and Medic of the Year at the organization's annual Reunion Awards Banquet. The award is a bust of Kelly.

== Documentary film tribute ==
In 2002, the documentary film crew of In the Shadow of the Blade honored Kelly's story at their landing zone near Columbus, Georgia. After hearing the story of his father's courage from Vietnam Dustoff colleague Ernest Sylvester, Charles Kelly Jr. flew in the left seat of the documentary's restored UH-1 Iroquois, emulating his father's wartime experience.
