= Casualty evacuation =

Type of emergency casualty evacuation

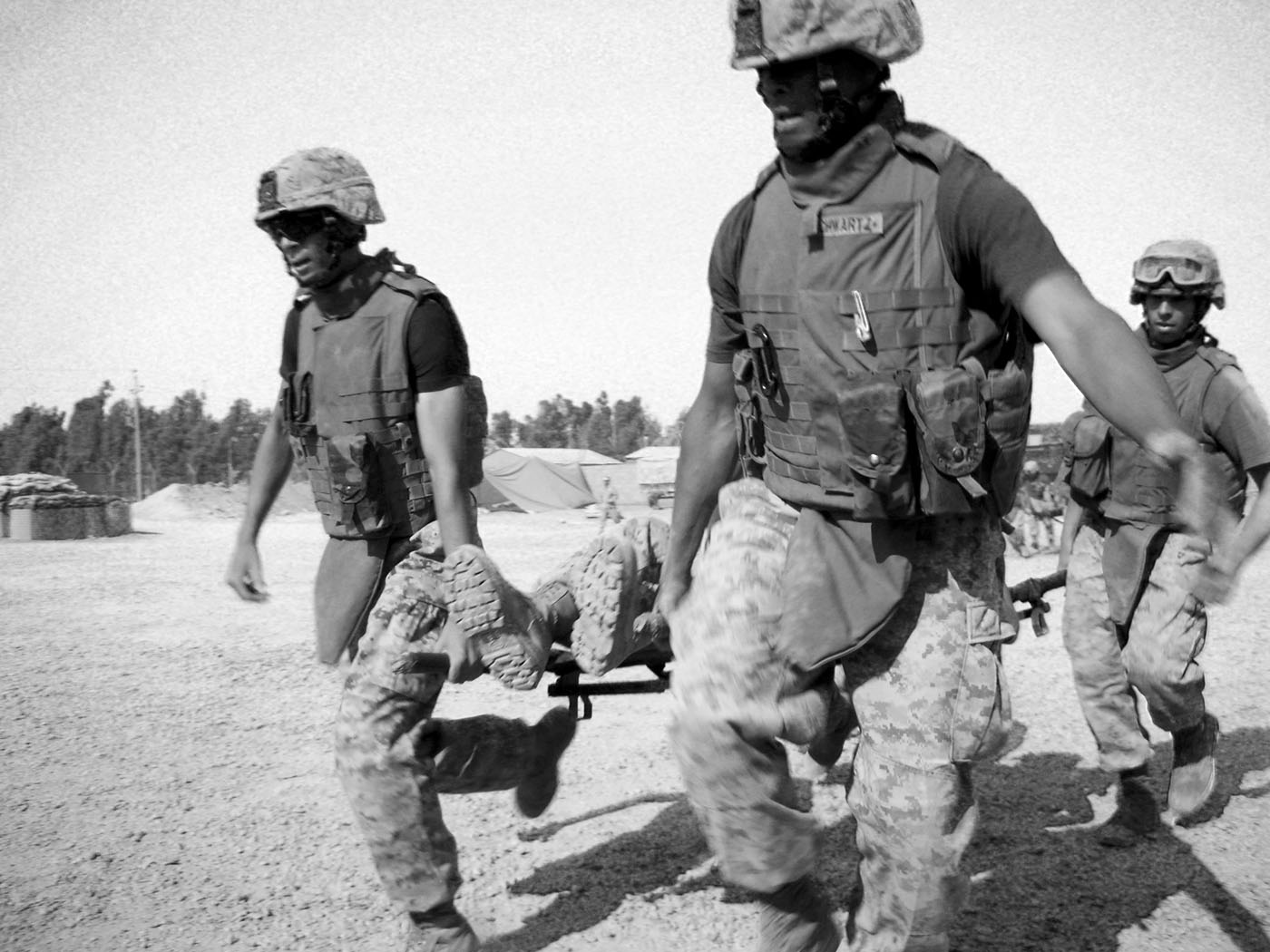
US Marines transport a non-ambulatory patient via litter, outside of Fallujah, Iraq in 2006

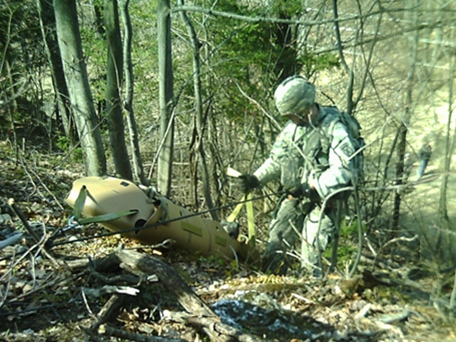
High-angle mountain CASEVAC training, at the U.S. Army Mountain Warfare School in Jericho, Vermont

Casualty evacuation, also known as CASEVAC or by the callsign Dustoff or colloquially Dust Off, is a military term for the emergency patient evacuation of casualties from a combat zone. Casevac can be done by both ground and air. "DUSTOFF" is the callsign specific to U.S. Army Air Ambulance units. CASEVACs by air today are almost exclusively done by helicopter, a practice begun on a small scale toward the end of World War II; before that, STOL aircraft, such as the Fieseler Fi 156 or Piper J-3 were used.

The primary difference between a CASEVAC and a medical evacuation (MEDEVAC) is that a MEDEVAC uses a standardized and dedicated vehicle providing en route care, while a CASEVAC uses non-standardized and non-dedicated vehicles that may or may not provide en route care. CASEVACs are commonly referred to as "a lift/flight of opportunity". If a corpsman/medic on the ground calls for a CASEVAC, the closest available unit with space could be called to assist, regardless of its medical capabilities. This could include U.S. Marine Corps aircraft such as the MV-22 Osprey, U.S. Navy SH-60 Seahawk helicopters, or CH-46 Sea Knight helicopters. The guiding principle in a CASEVAC is to transport casualties that are in dire need for evacuation from the battlefield and do not have time to wait on a MEDEVAC. MEDEVAC aircraft and ground transport are mandated by the Geneva Convention to be unarmed and well marked. Firing on "clearly marked and identified" MEDEVAC vehicles would be considered a war crime under Article II of the Geneva Convention, in the same sense as firing on a hospital ship would be a war crime. CASEVAC transport are allowed to be armed since they are normally used for other purposes but carry no penalties for engagement by hostile forces.

"Dust Off" was the tactical call sign for medical evacuation missions first used in 1963 by Major Lloyd E. Spencer, commander of the U.S. Army 57th Medical Detachment (Helicopter Ambulance). It became famous after an article by journalist Peter Arnett described the death of Spencer's successor in command, Major Charles L. Kelly, on 1 July 1964 and his dying words, "When I Have Your Wounded." The name was used by all Army medical evacuation units except one in the remainder of the war and continues to be used today by Army medical evacuation units. Typically air ambulances transport wounded soldiers categorized as "urgent" patients from point of injury to a medical facility within an hour of soldier(s) being wounded. Flying into an active landing zone to pick up wounded was a dangerous job. Peter Dorland and James Nanney wrote in Dust Off: Army Aeromedical Evacuation in Vietnam, "... slightly more a third of the aviators became casualties in their work, and the crew chiefs and medical corpsmen who accompanied them suffered similarly. The danger of their work was further borne out by the high rate of air ambulance loss to hostile fire: 3.3 times that of all other forms of helicopter missions in the Vietnam War."

All members of the US Armed Forces today are trained in some form of basic first aid. While lacking advanced life saving equipment and medical personnel in regular vehicles, all personnel today enter the combat zone with an Improved First Aid Kit (IFAK) on their equipment. The IFAK has basic medical supplies such as bandages, a tourniquet, and QuikClot gauze. Most units have stretchers and burn blankets in their vehicles. In addition each unit is staffed by a corpsman or medic. These professionals are trained in Tactical Combat Casualty Care.

The U.S. military has worked to ensure dedicated MEDEVAC platforms with trained medical personnel are available in the event of a casualty. This has, in part, led to a 90.6% casualty survival rate (numbers from operations in Afghanistan and Iraq, 2006), compared to 80.9% in World War II.

In Australian military terminology, a CASEVAC refers to the evacuation of a small number of troops, usually just one.

During the Russo-Ukrainian War, both unmanned aerial vehicles (UAVs) and unmanned ground vehicles (UGVs) have increasingly been used, particularly by the Armed Forces of Ukraine, for casualty evacuation (CASEVAC), particularly in high-threat environments where traditional evacuation methods are difficult or impossible under drone and artillery fire.

== CASEVAC Club ==
The CASEVAC Club, established in 2017, is a mutual support group for British service personnel seriously injured in the Iraq and Afghan wars of the 21st century. It was inspired by the similar Guinea Pig Club for British and allied aircrew injured during World War II.

== See also ==
- Aeromedical evacuation
- Air Ambulance
- Medical evacuation
- Battlefield medicine
